= 1957 1000 km of Nürburgring =

Sports car endurance race in Germany

The 3. Internationales ADAC 1000 Kilometer Rennen auf dem Nürburgring took place on 26 May 1957, on the Nürburgring Nordschleife, (West Germany). It was also the fourth round of the F.I.A. World Sports Car Championship. This would the first championship since the dreadful events in the Mille Miglia, Italy just a fortnight ago, where Alfonso de Portago crashed killing himself, his co-driver and nine spectators.

Nürburgring Nordschleife

== Report ==
=== Entry ===
A grand total 79 racing cars were registered for this event, of which 74 arrived for practice and qualifying. Fresh from their sad domination on the Mille Miglia, came two work teams of Scuderia Ferrari, and Officine Alfieri Maserati. The team from Maranello arrived with two cars, a Ferrari 335 S and a Ferrari 315 S. The former was to be driven by Peter Collins and Olivier Gendebien with the older car for Mike Hawthorn and Maurice Trintignant. In the Grand Touring class, one of the works driver, Wolfgang von Trips had an accident in the challenging Breidscheid section, following a change in a pedal layout in his Ferrari 250 GT. He was admitted to hospital with cuts and bruises and was unable to participate in the race.

Their Modenese rivals, who were just 2 points behind Ferrari going into the meeting, arrived with three cars, two 450Ss, plus a 300s. Their stars drivers, included Juan Manuel Fangio and Stirling Moss. With Porsche KG sending two cars to chase one of the less classes, it was left to the semi-works Jaguar D-Types from Ecurie Ecosse and David Brown's two works Aston Martin DBR1/300 to challenge the Italian marques.

=== Qualifying ===
Qualifying was held over three sessions for a total of 1,590 minutes over the three days prior to the race. The Maserati 450S of Fangio took pole position, averaging a speed of 87.446 mph around the 14.173 mile circuit. The '53 and '56 pole winner was on pole yet again, having given everyone a lesson on how to drive the 174 corners of the 'Ring. When the session had finished, Maserati had secured the first two places. The Aston Martin of Tony Brooks, secured third ahead of the Scuderia Ferraris.

=== Race ===
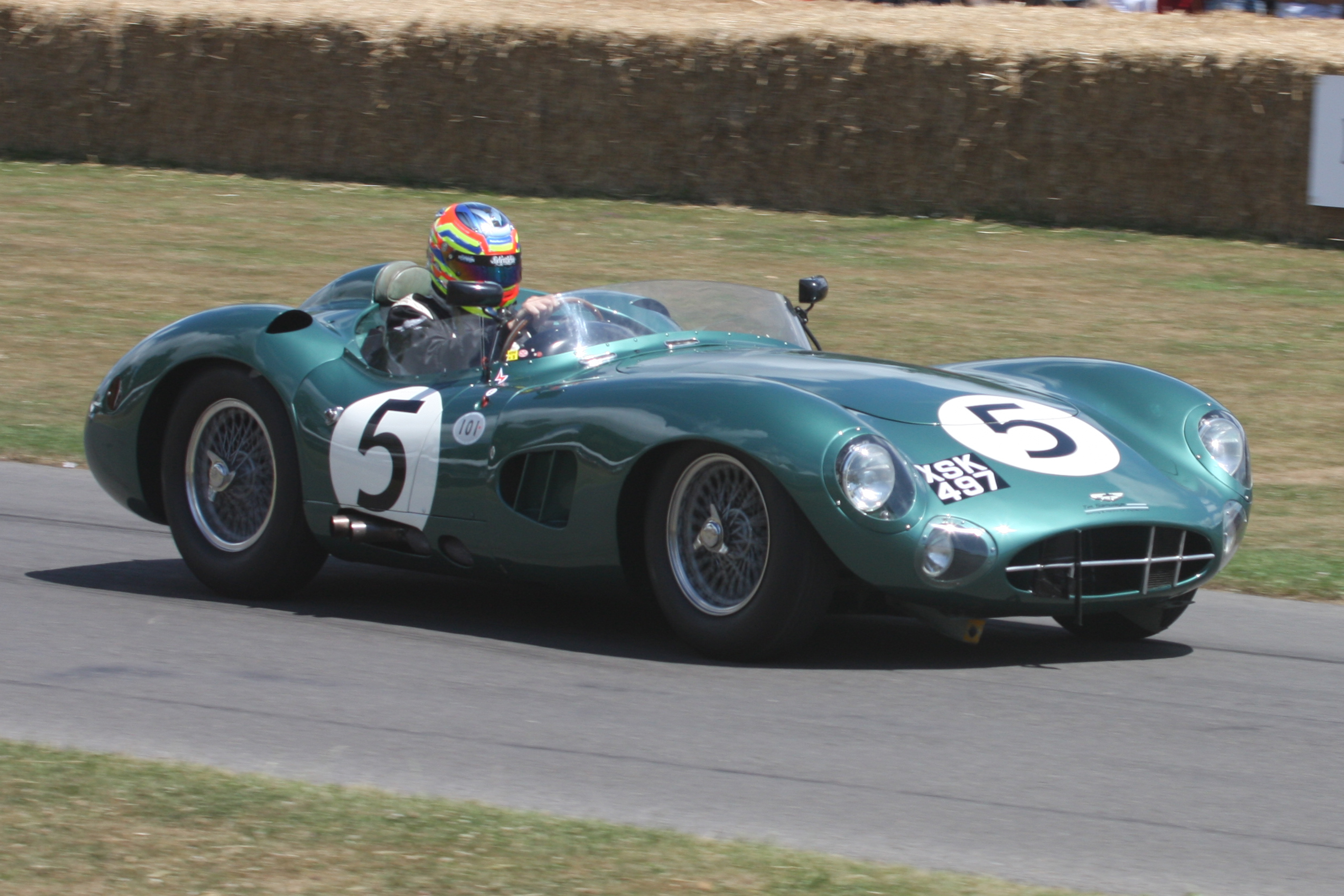
Aston Martin DBR1 - similar to the car driven to victory by Brooks/Cunningham-Reid

The day of the race would be warm and dry, but windy, with a crowd of approximately 120,000 in attendance. Although the Maserati 450S's had been expected to dominate, Brooks led from the start until passed by Moss after 8 laps who then led until on the 10th lap his 450S lost a rear wheel. The team then switched both Moss and Fangio into Harry Schell's car, leaving Hans Herrmann without a drive, but this car had an oil leak which caused it to make a premature stop and retire by lap 19. Francisco Godia-Sales then offered his older 300S to the works team, who placed both Moss and Fangio in the car and with him and his regular co-driver Horace Gould brought the car home in fifth place, securing Maserati two championship points.

As for victory in the race, this did not go to Scuderia Ferrari, as they were beaten by more than four minutes by the Aston Martin DBR1/300 of Brooks and Noël Cunningham-Reid who gained the marque their first points of the season and their first World Championship victory since the Tourist Trophy of 1953. The partnership, won in a time of 7hr 33:38.2 mins., averaging a speed of 82.485 mph. The margin of triumph over the Ferrari of Collins/Gendebien was 4 min 13.7s, who were followed home by their team-mates Hawthorn/Trintignant who were a further 1 min 35.3s adrift. Porsche snatched fourth place with Umberto Maglioli/Edgar Barth, but their 550A RS finished almost 17 minutes adrift of the winners. The Aston's pace was so quick that it lapped even the fifth placed Maserati 300S of Moss/Fangio/Godia-Sales/Gould. The race did not end when Brooks crossed the finishing line, but continued for another hour to allow the other classes/division to try and complete the full 1000 km.

== Official Classification ==
Class Winners are in Bold text.

Pos	No	Class	Driver		Entrant	Chassis	Laps	Reason Out
1st	**14**	**S+2.0**	(United Kingdom) **Tony Brooks**	(United Kingdom) **Noël Cunningham-Reid**	**David Brown**	**Aston Martin DBR1/300**	**7hr 33:38.2, 44**	
2nd	5	S+2.0	(United Kingdom) Peter Collins	(Belgium) Olivier Gendebien	Scuderia Ferrari	Ferrari 335 S	7hr 37:51.9, 44	
3rd	6	S+2.0	(United Kingdom) Mike Hawthorn	(France) Maurice Trintignant	Scuderia Ferrari	Ferrari 315 S	7hr 38:27.2, 44	
4th	**21**	**S1.5**	**(Italy) Umberto Maglioli**	**(East Germany) Edgar Barth**	**Porsche KG**	**Porsche 550A RS**	**7hr 47:17.3, 44**	
5th	4	S+2.0	(Spain) Francisco Godia-Sales (United Kingdom) Stirling Moss	(United Kingdom) Horace Gould (Argentina) Juan Manuel Fangio	Francisco Godia-Sales	Maserati 300S	43	
6th	12	S+2.0	(United Kingdom) Roy Salvadori	(United Kingdom) Les Leston	David Brown	Aston Martin DBR1/300	43	
7th	22	S1.5	(West Germany) Richard von Frankenberg	(West Germany) Helmut Schulze	Porsche KG	Porsche 550A RS	43	
8th	10	S+2.0	(United Kingdom) Ron Flockhart	(United Kingdom) Jack Fairman	Ecurie Ecosse	Jaguar D-Type	43	
9th	15	S+2.0	(United Kingdom) Peter Whitehead	(United Kingdom) Graham Whitehead	Peter Whitehead	Aston Martin DB3S	42	
10th	7T	S+2.0	(United States) Masten Gregory	(Italy) Olinto Morolli	Scuderia Temple Buell	Ferrari 250 TR	42	
11th	9	S+2.0	(United Kingdom) Ivor Bueb	(United Kingdom) Jock Lawrence	Ecurie Ecosse	Jaguar D-Type	42	
12th	30	S1.5	(Switzerland) Heinz Schiller	(Switzerland) Arthur Heuberger	Ecurie La Meute	Porsche 550 RS	42	
13th	**19**	**S2.0**	**(Austria) Gotfrid Köchert**	**(West Germany) Erwin Bauer**	**Gotfrid Köchert**	**Ferrari 500 TRC**	**41**	
14th	29	S1.5	(Netherlands) Carel Godin de Beaufort	(West Germany) Sepp Liebl	Ecurie Maarsbergen	Porsche 550 RS	42	
15th	3	S+2.0	(Sweden) Joakim Bonnier (United Kingdom) Stirling Moss	(Italy) Giorgio Scarlatti (United States) Harry Schell	Officine Alfieri Maserati	Maserati 300S	40	
16th	11	S+2.0	(United Kingdom) Ninian Sanderson	(United Kingdom) Dick Steed	Ecurie Ecosse	Jaguar D-Type	40	
17th	31	S1.5	(Belgium) Georges Harris	(Belgium) Claude Dubois	Equipe Nationale Belge	Porsche 550 RS	39	
18th	23	S1.5	(United Kingdom) Dick Fitzwilliam	(United Kingdom) Peter Simpson	Fitzwilliam Racing Team	MG A	37	
19th	33	S	(United Kingdom) David Piper	(United Kingdom) Bob Hicks	David Piper	Lotus-Climax Eleven	34	
20th	**46**	**GT+1.6**	**(West Germany) Fritz Riess**	**(West Germany) Walter Schock**	**Fritz Reiss**	**Mercedes-Benz 300 SL**	**8hr 27:45.6, 44**	
21st	40	GT+1.6	(West Germany) Wolfgang Seidel	(West Germany) Peter Nöcker	Wolfgang Seidel	Mercedes-Benz 300 SL	8hr 27:57.2, 44	
22nd	43	GT+1.6	(Sweden) Arne Lindberg	(West Germany) Erich Waxenberger	Arne Lindberg	Mercedes-Benz 300 SL	8hr 27:58.2, 44	
23rd	44	GT+1.6	(Sweden) Bengt Martenson	(West Germany) Wittigo Einsiedel	Bengt O. Martenson	Mercedes-Benz 300 SL	8hr 29:16.4, 44	
24th	**59**	**GT1.6**	**(West Germany) Paul-Ernst Strähle**	**(West Germany) Paul Denk**	**Paul-Ernst Strähle**	**Porsche 356A Carrera**	**8hr 30:16.8, 44**	
25th	55	GT1.6	(West Germany) Rolf-Friedrich Götze	(Austria) Ernst Vogel	Rolf-Friedrich Götze	Porsche 356A Carrera	8hr 32:42.2, 44	
26th	61	GT1.6	(West Germany) Hans-Joachim Walter	(West Germany) Herbert Linge	Olof Persson	Porsche 356A Carrera	8hr 36:4139, 44	
27th	70	GT1.6	(West Germany) Werner Krause	(West Germany) Lothar Bender	Werner Krause	Porsche 356A Carrera	8hr 39:37.0, 44	
28th	58	GT1.6	(West Germany) Hans-Georg Plaut	(West Germany) Helmut Zick	Hans-Georg Plaut	Porsche 356A Carrera	8hr 41:35.4, 44	
29th	64	GT1.6	(West Germany) Günter Besier	(West Germany) Dieter Lissmann	“Max”	Porsche 356A Carrera	43	
30th	50	GT1.6	(West Germany) Harald von Suacken	(West Germany) Georg Bialas	Harald von Suacken	Porsche 356A Carrera	43	
31st	62	GT1.6	(West Germany) Ludwig Blendl	(West Germany) Joachim Springer	Ludwig Blendl	Porsche 356A Carrera	42	
32nd	66	GT1.6	(West Germany) Richard Trenkel	(West Germany) Siegfried Günther	Richard Trenkel	Porsche 356A Carrera	42	
33rd	**80**	**GT1.3**	**(West Germany) Eberhard Mahle**	**(West Germany) Edmund Graf**	**Eberhard Mahle**	**Alfa Romeo Giulietta Veloce**	**8hr 37:24.3, 42**	
34th	86	GT1.3	(West Germany) Adolf-Werner Lang	(West Germany) ”Fritz Müller”	Adolf-Werner Lang	Alfa Romeo Giulietta Veloce	8hr 38:12.5, 42	
35th	89	GT1.3	(Switzerland) Karl Foitek	(Switzerland) Peter Morteverdi	Karl Foitek	Alfa Romeo Giulietta Veloce	8hr 48:31.9, 42	
36th	82	GT1.3	(Switzerland) Marcel Stern	(Switzerland) Paul Vogel	Ecurie La Meute	Alfa Romeo Giulietta Veloce	41	
37th	67	GT1.6	(West Germany) Helmut Duetenberg	(West Germany) Heinz-Gerd Jäger	Helmut Duetenberg	Porsche 356A Carrera	40	
38th	83	GT1.3	(West Germany) Karl Falk	(West Germany) Wolfgang Niessen	Karl Falk	Porsche 356A Carrera	40	
39th	68	GT1.6	(United States) Fred Block	(United States) Rod Carveth	Fred Block	Porsche 356A Carrera	39	
40th	91	GT1.3	(West Germany) Helmut Felder	(West Germany) Josef Jeser	Helmut Felder	Alfa Romeo Giulietta Veloce	39	
41st	56	GT1.6	(United Kingdom) John Blaksley	(United Kingdom) Ellis Cuff-Miller	Fitzwilliam Racing Team	MG A	38	
42nd	85	GT1.3	(West Germany) Harry Merkel	(West Germany) Hans Knippel	Harry Merkel	Porsche 356A	38	
43rd	92	GT1.3	(Netherlands) Mathieu Hezemans	(West Germany) Hubert Oebels	Ecurie Maarsbergen	Porsche 356A	38	
DNF	69	GT1.6	(United States) Don Dickey	(United States) Hains Christian	Donald R. Dickey	Porsche 356A Carrera	32	DNF
DNF	42	GT+1.6	(Sweden) Sten Bielke	(Sweden) Stig Eklund	Sten Bielke	Mercedes-Benz 300 SL	30	DNF
DNF	24	S1.5	(United Kingdom) Robin Carnegie	(United Kingdom) John Hogg	Fitzwilliam Racing Team	MG A	28	Dropped valve
DNF	41	GT+1.6	(West Germany) Gunther Thiel	(West Germany) Heinz Meyer	Wolfgang Seidel	Mercedes-Benz 300 SL	28	DNF
DNF	52	GT1.6	(West Germany) Rolf Appel	(West Germany) Fred Albrecht	Rolf Appel	Porsche 356A Carrera	22	DNF
DNF	28	S1.5	(Belgium) Georges Berger	(Belgium) Jean Otten	Georges Berger	Maserati 150S	21	DNF
DNF	88	GT1.3	(United States) Isabelle Haskell	(Argentina) Carlos Menditéguy	Madinina	Alfa Romeo Giulietta Veloce	21	Gearbox
DNF	2	S+2.0	(United States) Harry Schell (United Kingdom) Stirling Moss	(Argentina) Juan Manuel Fangio	Officine Alfieri Maserati	Maserati 450S	19	Oil tank
DNF	81	GT1.3	(Switzerland) Walter Ringgenberg	(Switzerland) Heini Walter	Walter Ringgenberg	Alfa Romeo Giulietta Veloce	18	Gearbox
DNF	32	S	(United Kingdom) Mike Anthony	(United Kingdom) Bill Frost	Mike P. Anthony	Lotus-Climax Eleven	17	Accident
DNF	26	S1.5	(Italy) Luigi Piotti	(Italy) Corrado Manfredini	Automibili Osca	Osca S1500	15	DNF
DNF	87	GT1.3	(West Germany) Kurt Zeller	(West Germany) Rudolf Wilhelm Moser	Kurt Zeller	Alfa Romeo Giulietta Veloce	11	DNF
DNF	17	S2.0	(Spain) António Creus	(Belgium) Freddy Rouselle	António Creus	Ferrari 750 Monza	11	Shock absorber
DNF	53	GT1.6	(West Germany) Hanns Roth	(West Germany) Ludwig Fischer	Hanns Roth	Porsche 356A Carrera	11	DNF
DNF	1	S+2.0	(United Kingdom) Stirling Moss	(Argentina) Juan Manuel Fangio	Officine Alfieri Maserati	Maserati 450S	9	Lost rear wheel
DNF	34	S	(United Kingdom) Tony Hogg	(United Kingdom) David Piper	David Piper	Lotus-Climax Eleven	7	Accident
DNF	16	S+2.0	(United Kingdom) Henry Taylor	(United Kingdom) Archie Scott Brown	Murkett Bros.	Jaguar D-Type	4	Accident
DNF	45	GT+1.6	(France) Jacques de Maubou	(France) Georges Brule	Jacques de Maubou	Jaguar XK140	4	DNF
DNF	57	GT1.6	(United Kingdom) Patsy Burt	(United Kingdom) Jean Bloxham	Fitzwilliam Racing Team	MG A	4	Oil pump
DNF	65	GT1.6	(Sweden) Bo Elmhorn (Sweden) Bertil Nässil	(West Germany) Dieter von Reiswitz	Bo Elmhorn	MG A	4	DNF
DNF	84	GT1.3	(West Germany) Helmut Busch	(West Germany) K. H. Zimmerman	Helmut Busch	MG A	4	DNF
DNF	36	S	(United States) Herbert MacKay-Fraser	(United Kingdom) Dan Marqulies	Dan Marqulies	Lotus-Climax Eleven	3	Rear axle
DISQ	25	S1.5	(Italy) Sergio Mantovani	(Argentina) Alejandro de Tomaso	Madunina	Osca S1500		Assistance
DISQ	51	GT1.6	(West Germany) Sepp Greger	(West Germany) Wolfgang Bieling	Sepp Greger	Porsche 356A Carrera		Assistance
DNS	48	GT+1.6	(Belgium) Olivier Gendebien	(West Germany) Wolfgang von Trips	Equipe Nationale Belge	Ferrari 250 GT LWB Scaglietti		DNS – Accident in practice

- Fastest Lap: Stirling Moss, 9:49.9secs (86.497 mph)

=== Class Winners ===
Class	Winners		
Sports +2000	14	Aston Martin DBR1/300	Brooks / Cunningham-Reid
Sports 2000	19	Ferrari 500 TRC	Köchert / Bauer
Sports 1500	21	Porsche 550A RS	Maglioli / Barth
Grand Touring +1600	46	Mercedes-Benz 300 SL	Riess / Schook
Grand Touring 1600	59	Porsche 356A Carrera	Strähle / Denk
Grand Touring 1300	80	Alfa Romeo Giulietta Veloce	Mahle / Graf

== Standings after the race ==
Pos	Championship	Points
1	(Italy) Ferrari	25
2	(Italy) Maserati	19
3	(United Kingdom) Aston Martin	8
4	(United Kingdom) Jaguar	7
5	(West Germany) Porsche	5

- Note: Only the top five positions are included in this set of standings.
  Championship points were awarded for the first six places in each race in the order of 8-6-4-3-2-1. Manufacturers were only awarded points for their highest finishing car with no points awarded for positions filled by additional cars. Only the best 4 results out of the 7 races could be retained by each manufacturer. Points earned but not counted towards the championship totals are listed within brackets in the above table.

World Sportscar Championship
Previous race: Mille Miglia	1957 season	Next race: 24 Hours of Le Mans
