= Colin Chapman =

English design engineer (1928–1982)

Colin Chapman CBE RDI
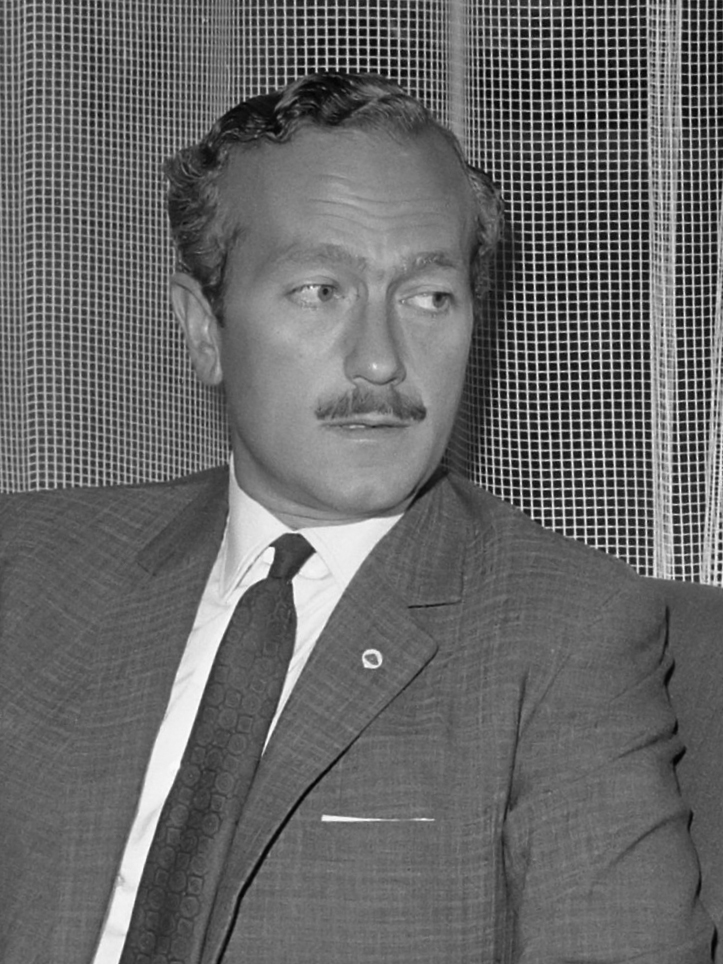
- Chapman in 1965
- Born: 19 May 1928; Richmond, Surrey, England
- Died: 16 December 1982 (aged 54); Norwich, Norfolk, England

Formula One World Championship career
- Nationality: (United Kingdom) British
- Active years: 1956
- Team: Vanwall
- Entries: 1 (0 starts)
- Championships: 0
- Wins: 0
- Podiums: 0
- Career points: 0
- Pole positions: 0
- Fastest laps: 0
- First entry: 1956 French Grand Prix

Anthony Colin Bruce Chapman CBE RDI (19 May 1928 – 16 December 1982) was an English design engineer, inventor, and builder in the automotive industry, and founder of the sports car company Lotus Cars.

Chapman founded Lotus in 1952 and initially ran Lotus in his spare time, assisted by a group of enthusiasts. His knowledge of the latest aeronautical engineering techniques would prove vital towards achieving the major automotive technical advances for which he is remembered. Chapman's design philosophy focused on cars with light weight and fine handling instead of bulking up on horsepower and spring rates, which he famously summarised as "Adding power makes you faster on the straights. Adding lightness makes you faster everywhere."

Team Lotus won seven Formula One Constructors' titles, six Drivers' Championships, and the Indianapolis 500 in the United States, between 1962 and 1978 under his direction. The production side of Lotus Cars has built tens of thousands of relatively affordable sports cars. Lotus is one of but a handful of English performance car builders still in business after the industrial decline of the 1970s.

Chapman suffered a fatal heart attack in 1982, aged 54.

== Early life ==
Anthony Colin Bruce Chapman was born on 19 May 1928 in Richmond, Surrey, and brought up at 44 Beech Drive, on the border of Muswell Hill in London N2. His father ran The Railway Hotel on Tottenham Lane next to Hornsey Railway Station. Chapman attended the Stationers' Company's School in Mayfield Road.

== Education ==
Chapman studied structural engineering at University College London, joining the University of London Air Squadron and learning to fly. He left UCL without a degree in 1948, resitting his final mathematics paper in 1949 and obtaining his degree a year late.

Chapman briefly joined the Royal Air Force in 1948, being offered a permanent commission but turning this down in favour of a swift return to civilian life. After a couple of false starts, Chapman joined the British Aluminium company, using his civil engineering skills to attempt to sell aluminium as a viable structural material for buildings.

== Career ==
In 1948, Chapman designed the Mk1, a modified Austin 7, which he entered privately into local racing events. He named the car "Lotus"; he never confirmed the reason, but one of several theories is that it was after his then-girlfriend (later wife) Hazel, whom he nicknamed "Lotus blossom". With the prize money, he developed the Lotus Mk2. Around this time, Chapman began to show his ability to think of ways to become more competitive while remaining within the rules. One early car had a 6 port head with 4 exhaust and two inlet ports. Chapman realised that better flow characteristics (and therefore more power) could be achieved with an 8 port head, but lacking the resources to have one made, he reversed the port functions and de-siamesed the old inlet ports. With appropriate manifolds and a new camshaft, his engine outclassed the opposition until the rules were changed to outlaw the specific changes he had made. With continuing success on through the Lotus 6, he began to sell kits of these cars. Over 100 were sold through 1956. It was with the Lotus 7 in 1957 that things really took off, and indeed Caterham Cars still manufacture a version of that car today – the Caterham 7; there have been over 90 different Lotus 7 clones, replicas and derivatives offered to the public by a variety of makers.

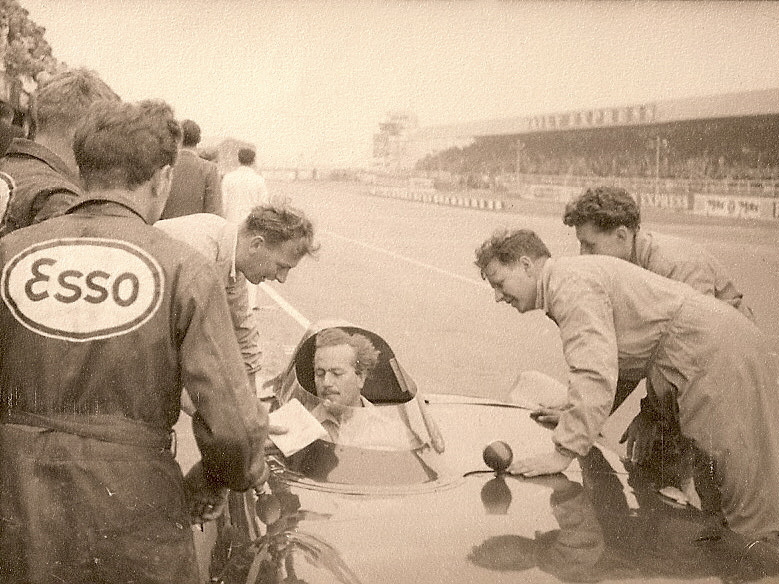
Chapman at the wheel of one of his own Lotus Eleven sports cars, during practice for the 1956 British Grand Prix Formula Two race at Silverstone. Lotus Development Director Mike Costin on left holding notes. Chief Mechanic John Crosthwaite on right leaning on car.

In the 1950s, Chapman progressed through the motor racing formulae, designing and building a series of racing cars, sometimes to the point of maintaining limited production as they were so successful and highly sought after, until he arrived in Formula One. Besides his engineering work, he also piloted a Vanwall F1-car in 1956 but crashed into his teammate Mike Hawthorn during practice for the French Grand Prix at Reims, ending his career as a race driver and focusing him on the technical side. Along with John Cooper, he revolutionised the premier motor sport. Their small, lightweight mid-engined vehicles gave away much in terms of power, but superior handling meant their competing cars often beat the all-conquering front engined Ferraris and Maseratis. Eventually, with driver Jim Clark at the wheel of his race cars, Team Lotus appeared as though they could win whenever they pleased. With Clark driving the Lotus 25, Team Lotus won its first F1 World Championship in 1963. It was Clark, driving a Lotus 38 at the Indianapolis 500 in 1965, who drove the first-ever mid-engined car to victory at the "Brickyard". Clark and Chapman became particularly close and Clark's death in 1968 devastated Chapman, who publicly stated that he had lost his best friend. Among a number of automotive figures who have been Lotus employees over the years were Cosworth founders Mike Costin and Keith Duckworth, and Graham Hill who worked at Lotus as a mechanic as a means of earning drives. In 1966, it was Chapman who persuaded the Ford Motor Company to sponsor Cosworth's development of what would become the DFV race engine.

== Innovations and legacy ==
Many of Chapman's ideas can still be seen in Formula One and other top-level motor sport, such as IndyCars, into the 21st century. He pioneered the use of struts as a rear suspension device. Struts used in the rear of a vehicle are known as Chapman struts, while virtually identical suspension struts for the front are known as MacPherson struts that were invented ten years earlier in 1949.

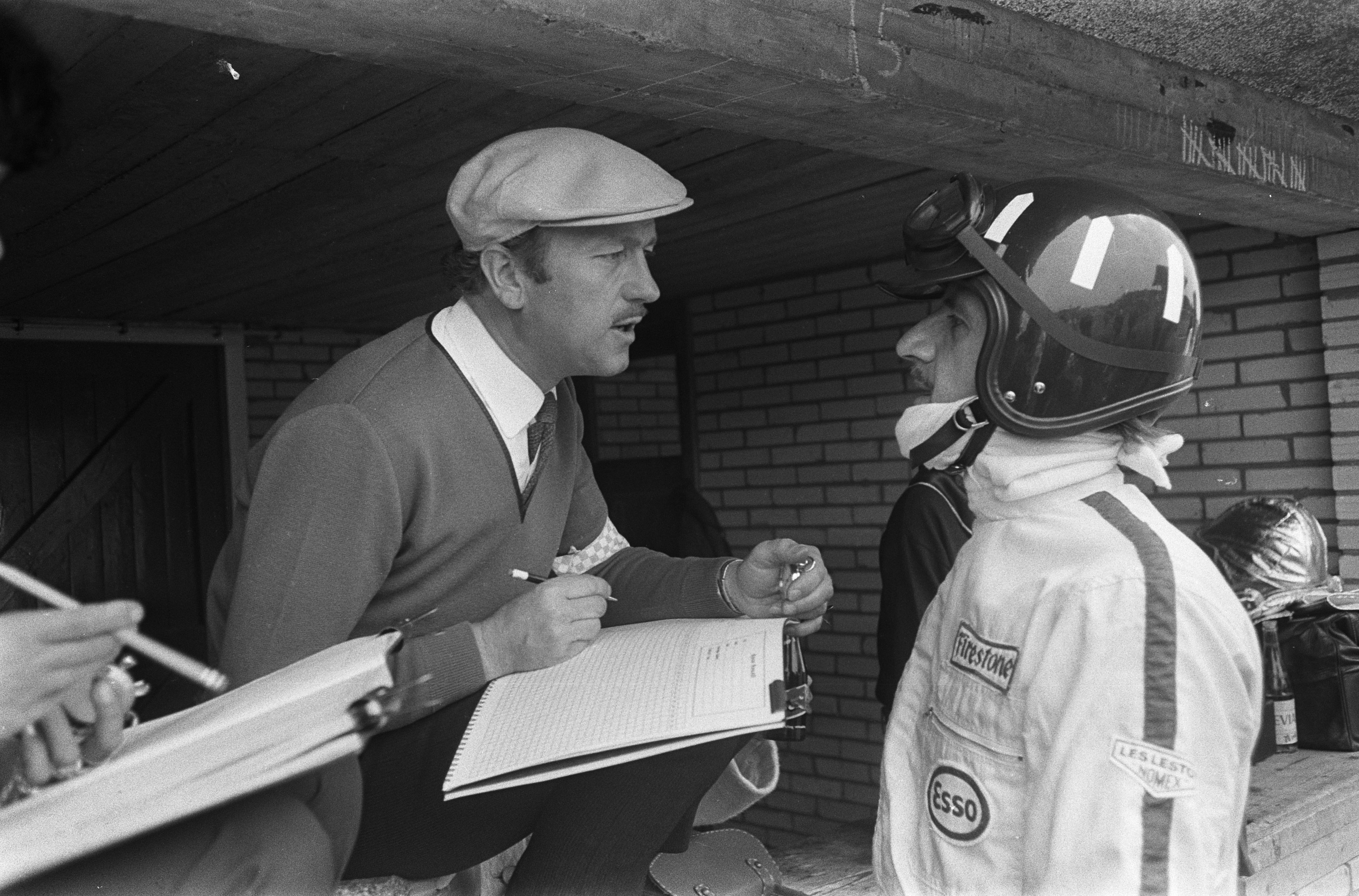
Chapman with Graham Hill at the 1967 Dutch Grand Prix

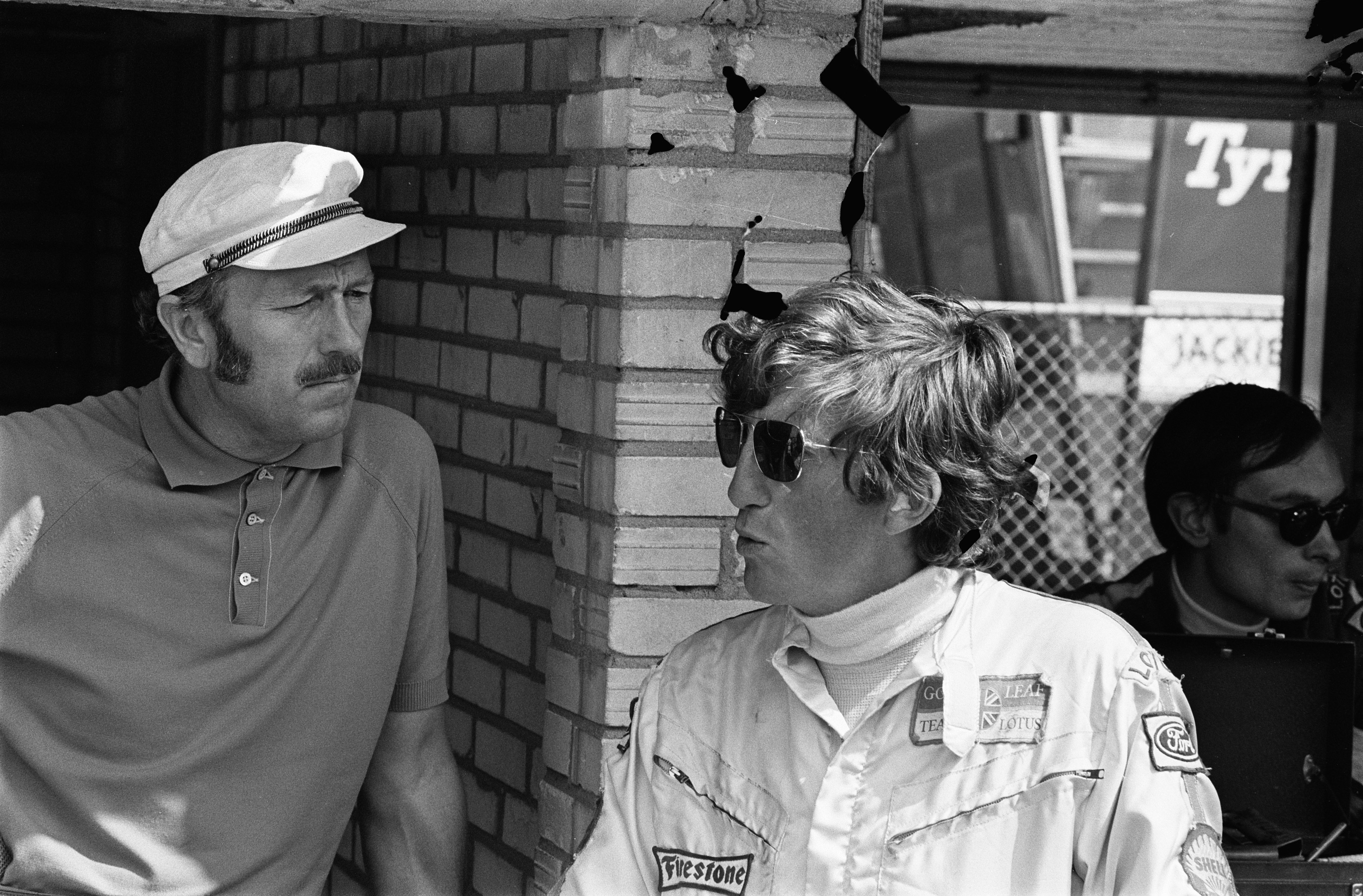
Chapman with Jochen Rindt at the 1970 Dutch Grand Prix

Chapman's next major innovation was popularising monocoque chassis construction within automobile racing, with the revolutionary 1962 Lotus 25 Formula One car. The technique resulted in a body that was both lighter and stronger, and also provided better driver protection in the event of a crash. Although a previously little-used concept in the world of motorsport, the first vehicle to feature such a chassis was the road-going 1922 Lancia Lambda. Lotus had been an early adopter of this technology with the 1958 Lotus Elite. The modified monocoque body of the car was made of fibreglass, making it also one of the first production cars made of composite materials.

When American Formula One driver Dan Gurney first saw the Lotus 25 at the Dutch Grand Prix at Zandvoort, he was so struck by the advanced design that he invited Chapman to the 1962 Indianapolis 500, where Gurney made his Indy début at the wheel of a space-frame rear engined car designed by John Crosthwaite (who had previously worked for Chapman) and built by American hot-rodder Mickey Thompson. Following the race, Chapman prepared a proposal to Ford Motor Company for an aluminium alloy monocoque Indianapolis car using a 4.2-litre aluminium V-8 Ford passenger car engine. Ford accepted the proposal. The Lotus 29 debuted at Indianapolis in 1963, with Jim Clark finishing second. This design concept fairly quickly replaced what had been for many decades the standard design formula in racing-cars, the tube-frame chassis. Although the material has changed from sheet aluminium to carbon fibre, this remains today the standard technique for building top-level racing cars.

Inspired by Jim Hall, Chapman was among those who helped introduce aerodynamics into Formula One car design. Lotus used the concept of positive aerodynamic downforce, through the addition of wings, at a Tasman Formula race in early 1968, although Ferrari and Brabham were the first to use them in a Formula One race at the 1968 Belgian Grand Prix. Early versions, in 1968 and 1969, were mounted 3 feet (0.91 m) or so above the car, to operate in 'clean air' (air that would not otherwise be disturbed by the passage of the car). The underdesigned wings and struts failed regularly, however, compelling the FIA to require the wing mounting hardware to be attached directly to the sprung chassis. Chapman also originated the movement of radiators away from the front of the car to the sides, to decrease frontal area (lowering aerodynamic drag) and centralising weight distribution. These concepts remain features of virtually all high performance racing cars today.

Chapman, working with Tony Rudd and Peter Wright, pioneered the first Formula One use of "ground effect", where a low pressure was created under the car by use of the Venturi effect, generating suction (downforce) which held it securely to the road whilst cornering. Early designs utilized sliding "skirts" which made contact with the ground to keep the area of low pressure isolated.

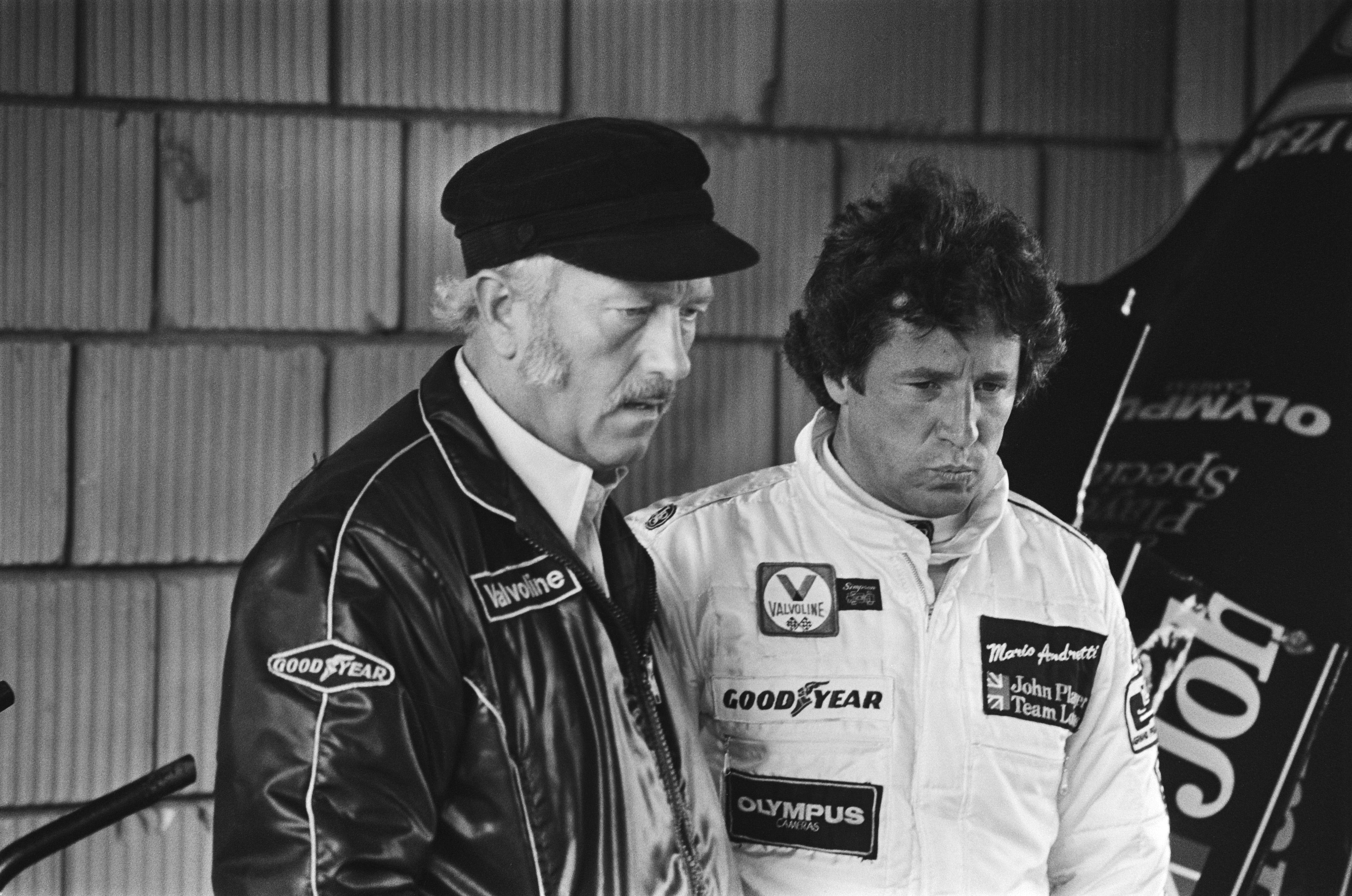
Chapman and his lead driver, Mario Andretti, pictured during their double World Championship-winning 1978 season with the ground effect Lotus 79

Chapman next planned a car that generated all of its downforce through ground effect, eliminating the need for wings and the resulting drag that reduces a car's speed. The culmination of his efforts, the Lotus 79, dominated the 1978 championship. However, skirts were eventually banned because they were susceptible to damage, for example from driving over a kerb, whereafter downforce would be lost and the car could then become unstable. The FIA made moves to eliminate ground effect in Formula One by raising the minimum ride height of the cars from 1981 and requiring flat bottom cars from 1983. Car designers have managed to claw back much of that downforce through other means, aided by extensive wind tunnel testing.

One of his last major technical innovations was a dual-chassis Formula One car, the Lotus 88 in 1981. For ground effect of that era to function most efficiently, the aerodynamic surfaces needed to be precisely located and this led to the chassis being very stiffly sprung. However, this was very punishing to the driver, resulting in driver fatigue. To get around this, Chapman introduced a car with two chassis. One chassis (where the driver would sit) was softly sprung. The other chassis (where the skirts and such were located) was stiffly sprung. Although the car passed scrutineering at a couple of races, other teams protested, and it was never allowed to race. The car was never developed further. The banning of the car led to Chapman becoming depressed and disillusioned with Grand Prix racing.

Chapman, whose father was a successful publican, was also a businessman and innovator in the business end of racing. He introduced major advertising sponsorship into auto racing; beginning the process which transformed Formula One from a pastime of rich gentlemen to a multi-million pound high technology enterprise. He was among the first entrants in Formula One to turn their cars into rolling billboards for non-automotive products, initially with the cigarette brands Gold Leaf and, most famously, John Player Special.

=== DeLorean scandal ===
From 1978 until his death, Chapman was involved with the American tycoon John DeLorean, in his development of a stainless steel sports car to be built in a factory in Northern Ireland, which was majority-funded by the UK government. The original concept design was for a mid-engine sports car, but difficulty in securing the original Wankel engine rights and design complications led to the rear-engine mount design. This project would eventually evolve into the DMC DeLorean.

On 19 October 1982, John DeLorean was charged with trafficking cocaine by the US Government, following a videotaped sting operation at a hotel in Los Angeles, in which he was recorded by undercover FBI agents agreeing to bankroll a 100 kilograms (220 lb) cocaine smuggling operation. DeLorean Motor Cars subsequently collapsed, during which administrators discovered that £10,000,000 of British taxpayers' money (approximately equivalent to £37 million in 2024) had gone missing.

Lotus Group's 1981 accounts were overdue before Chapman's death, but, when released after his death, disclosed that Lotus had been paid for engineering work by DeLorean via a Switzerland-based Panamanian company run by a DeLorean distributor, despite Chapman's previous protestations that neither he nor the company had been paid via Panama. Chapman died before the full deceit unravelled, but, at the subsequent trial of Lotus Group accountant Fred Bushell, who had funnelled £5 million to himself in the fraud, the trial judge opined that, had Chapman himself been in the dock, he would have received a sentence "of at least 10 years". The car's engineering concept was later sold by the UK Government appointed administrators to Toyota, who used it to develop the AW11 MR2. The liquidators also recovered around £20 million from Swiss bank accounts controlled by Chapman and John DeLorean.

== Personal life ==
Chapman was married to Hazel Chapman (1927–2021). He had two daughters and one son.

== Death ==
The night before he died, Chapman watched a performance by his long-time friend and Lotus customer Chris Barber, the jazz trombonist, and his band. On 16 December 1982, Team Lotus tested the first Formula One car with active suspension, which eventually made its début with the Lotus 99T in 1987. Chapman suffered a fatal heart attack on the same day at his home in Norwich, and died at the age of 54.

== Racing record ==
=== 24 Hours of Le Mans results ===
Year	Team	Co-Drivers	Car	Class	Laps	Pos.	Class Pos.
1955	(United Kingdom) Lotus Engineering	(United Kingdom) Ron Flockhart	Lotus Mark IX	S1.1	99	DSQ	DSQ
1956	(United Kingdom) Lotus Engineering	(United States) Herbert MacKay-Fraser	Lotus Eleven	S1.5	172	DNF	DNF
1957	(United Kingdom) Lotus Engineering	(United States) Jay Chamberlain (United States) Herbert MacKay-Fraser	Lotus Eleven	S1.5	-	DNS	DNS

=== Complete Formula One World Championship results ===
(key)

Year	Entrant	Chassis	Engine	1	2	3	4	5	6	7	8	WDC	Points
1956	Vandervell Products Ltd.	Vanwall	Vanwall 2.5l Straight-4	ARG	MON	500	BEL	FRA; DNS	GBR	GER	ITA	NC	0

== Awards ==
- He was awarded "Mike's Mug" by the Royal Aero Club in 1961.
- He was voted The Guardian 'Young Businessman of the Year' in 1970.
- He was appointed a Commander of the Order of the British Empire in the 1970 New Year Honours for services to Exports.
- He was made a Royal Designer for Industry for Automotive Design in 1979.
- He was inducted in the International Motorsports Hall of Fame in 1994.
- He was inducted in the Motorsports Hall of Fame of America in 1997.
