= Noël Cunningham-Reid =

Amateur racing driver (1930–2017)

- Born: Noël Robert Cunningham-Reid; 25 December 1930 Pimlico, London
- Died: 4 October 2017 (aged 86) Great Wilbraham, Cambridgeshire

Noël Robert Cunningham-Reid (25 December 1930 – 4 October 2017) was a British racing driver, who drove for Aston Martin in the World Sportscar Championship in the 1950s, winning one race.

== Early life ==
Christened Noël because he was born on Christmas Day, he was the son of Member of Parliament Alec Cunningham-Reid and the former Mary Cholmondeley, Baroness Delamere, a niece of Lady Louis Mountbatten; Lord Louis Mountbatten was one of his godparents. He was educated at Stowe School and went up to Clare College, Cambridge.

During the Second World War, he was evacuated to Hawaii, where his father's then-paramour Doris Duke had a property; she became his guardian for the period.

== Racing career ==
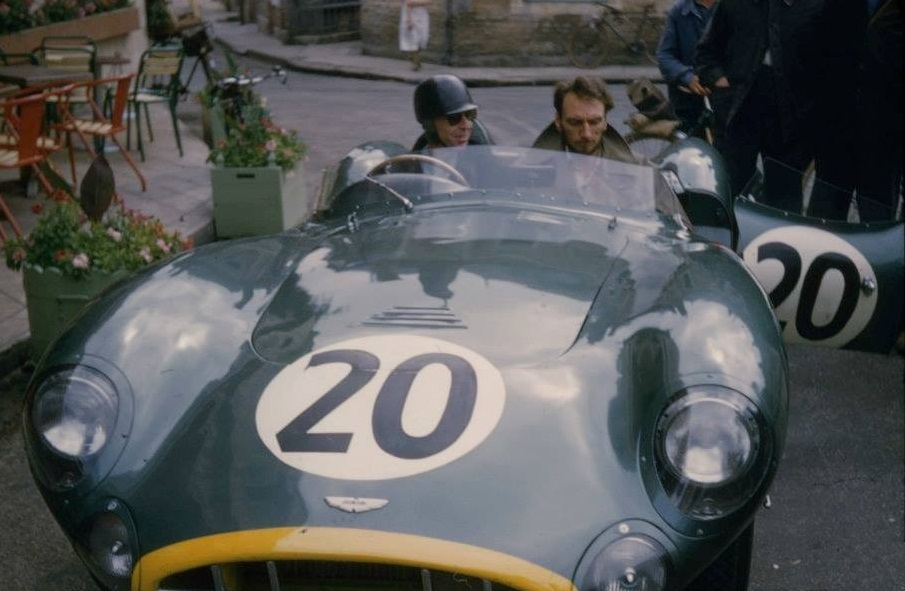
Tony Brooks at the wheel of the DBR1 at the Hôtel de France before the 1957 Le Mans 24 Hours

Cunningham-Reid's racing career only ran from 1954 to 1957, starting when he bought an Aston Martin DB2, which gained him automatic entry to the Aston Martin Owners Club, and took part in occasional club meetings, mainly to learn how to drive a powerful car properly. In 1955 he bought a Lister-Bristol to undertake more serious racing, and his success with that encouraged the HWM-Jaguar outfit to offer him a supported car for the 1956 season for £500.

After a promising test with the works Astons, he was given a contract for the 1957 season, and took part in two races in the 1957 World Sportscar Championship. The first was the Nürburgring 1000km, originally being tabbed to share with Roy Salvadori, but, after an impressive run of practice laps in an Aston Martin DB3S, was switched to sharing with Tony Brooks' DBR1. Never having driven at the 'Ring before, and having undertaken practice laps in a Volkswagen with future Member of Parliament Alan Clark, Cunningham-Reid was merely expected to keep the DBR1 competitive in his stint, but he actually increased the lead Brooks had earned, while preserving the tyres enough not to need a change at the end of his laps. The result was an unexpected victory for the duo. The pair were teamed together for the 1957 24 Hours of Le Mans in the same car, but at midnight, with the car stuck in fourth gear and yet still running second in the race, Brooks - trying to manipulate the gears - crashed at Tertre Rouge.

1957 also saw Cunningham-Reid's one single seater start, in the 1957 International Trophy Formula 1 race, driving a Rob Walker-entered Cooper T41, in which he finished 12th out of 18 finishers - one place ahead of Graham Hill in a newer works model.

Despite such a mercurial start to a career, the triumph proved something of a swansong, as Cunningham-Reid did not continue racing after 1957. His last races were at the Daily Express Meeting at Silverstone in September; in the sportscar race, driving an Aston Martin DBR2, he cheekily passed Brooks on the last lap as a farewell, and his very final race came in a touring car race later that day, driving for DKW's concessionaires AFN Limited, winning his class. He said that "during that three-year period something like 15 or 16 people I knew or knew of had been killed racing. Also, you have to know your limitations and I knew in my heart of hearts just from following the great drivers - on the rare occasions I was able to - that I was not a potential World Champion.

== Post-racing ==
Cunningham-Reid had a number of other interests, which he pursued post-racing; he produced a couple of short films, and ran a farm in Cambridgeshire with accompanying partridge shoot, Cunningham-Reid himself being rated by The Field magazine as an all-time top 20 shot.
