= 1957 24 Hours of Le Mans =

25th 24 Hours of Le Mans endurance race

| Previous: 1956 | Next: 1958 |
Index: Races | Winners

The 1957 24 Hours of Le Mans was the 25th running of the 24 Hours of Le Mans, Grand Prix of Endurance, and took place on 22 and 23 June 1957, on the Circuit de la Sarthe. It was also the fifth round of the F.I.A. World Sports Car Championship. Some 250,000 spectators had gathered for Europe's classic sports car race, around an 8.38-mile course. The prospect of an exciting duel between Ferrari, Maserati, Jaguar, Aston Martin and Porsche was enough to draw large crowds to the 24 Hours race, now back at its usual date and reintegrated into the World Championship.

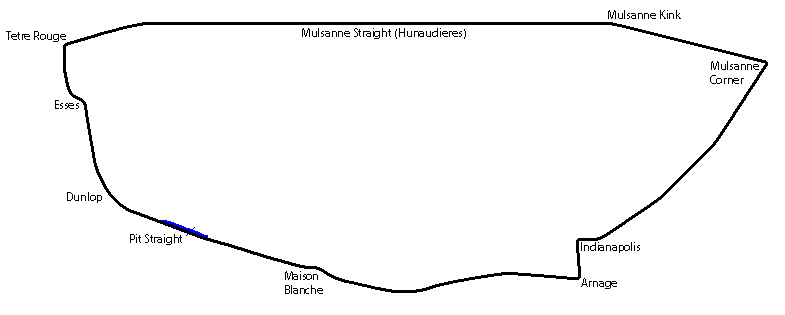
Le Mans in 1957

British motorsport achieved unprecedented success at the 1957 24 Hours of Le Mans, with Jaguars securing five of the top six positions. This performance was particularly impressive to viewers given that the leading cars were private entries, and not factory-backed works teams, making the victory over manufacturer-backed competitors even more remarkable.

== Regulations ==
After the major changes in the previous year, the ACO relented on its engine-size limitation – prototypes were again an open limit. They did, however, address body-shape requirements: the token second seat. Cars now had to have at least two doors and both seats had to be the same size, in a cockpit a minimum 1.2m wide. The minimum windscreen height was reduced from 20 to 15 cm, maximum fuel-tank size was 120 litres, and the total fuel usage restrictions were removed a year after they were imposed. One of the oldest regulations was removed – of having to carry all spares and tools on the car, allowing them to be left in the pits.

This all re-aligned with the FIA/CSI, who themselves issued a major new Appendix C to the Sports Car regulations based closely on the 1956 ACO regulations. Therefore, the Le Mans race was drafted back into the World Sportscar Championship.

The number of starters was fixed at 55. The maximum drive time stayed at 14 hours, but drivers were now limited to a maximum single stint of 36 laps, down from the previous year's 72 laps. The interval between refuelling was reduced for the first time, down to 30 laps from 34 laps. This year, for the Index of Performance, the target distances for nominal engine sizes were set as follows (according to a specific formula):

| Engine Capacity | Total Distance | Average Speed |
|---|---|---|
| S-4000 | 3710.8 km | 154.6 km/h |
| S-3500 | 3671.2 km | 153.0 km/h |
| S-3000 | 3619.0 km | 150.8 km/h |
| S-2500 | 3547.1 km | 147.8 km/h |
| S-2000 | 3441.9 km | 143.4 km/h |
| S-1500 | 3272.7 km | 136.4 km/h |
| S-1100 | 3040.0 km | 126.7 km/h |
| S-1000 | 2956.5 km | 123.2 km/h |
| S-750 | 2666.7 km | 111.1 km/h |

The Hors Course rule was revised: there would be systematic disqualification after every 6 hours (rather than previous 12 hours) of cars that had fallen more than 20% below its nominal Index of Performance at that time. Finally, the ACO formalised a ban on female drivers, after the death of Annie Bousquet in the 1956 12 Hours of Reims

== Entries ==
A total of 82 racing cars were registered for this event, of which 58 were allowed to practice, trying to qualify for the 55 starting places for the race. The big talking point with the entry list was the non-appearance of the works Jaguar team, which had retired from racing at the end of the previous year; and the arrival in force of Maserati in the top class.

| Category | Classes | Entries |
|---|---|---|
| Large-engines | S-5000 / S-3000 | 22 |
| Medium-engines | S-2000 / S-1500 | 15 (+2 reserves) |
| Small-engines | S-1100 / S-750 | 18 (+3 reserves) |

In the absence of the works team, the defending champions put their support behind their customer teams. Ex-works driver Duncan Hamilton and Ecurie Ecosse both had one of the experimental fuel-injected 3.8L-engined cars, capable of nearly 300 bhp. Ecurie Ecosse also ran the 3.4L car that Paul Frère had crashed early in the previous year's race (and arriving still in its British Racing Green straight from the Jaguar factory). Frère himself was racing for his native Equipe Nationale Belge using the same car the team had finished 4th in 1956. Finally there was the car for French industrial diamond-manufacturer privateer Jean Brussin (racing under the pseudonym “Mary”) in conjunction with the Lyon-based Los Amigos racing team.

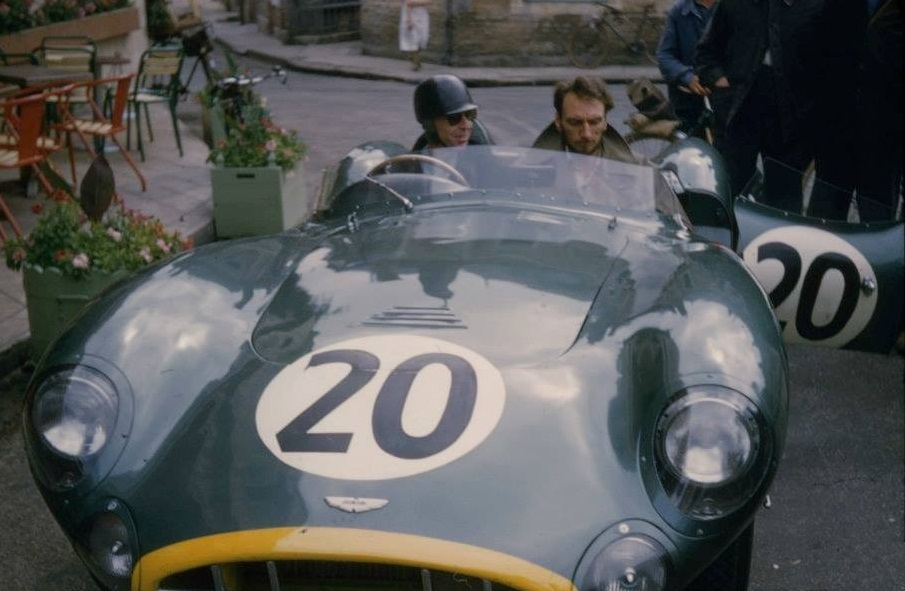
Tony Brooks (driving) in his Aston Martin DBR1 at the Hotel de France just before the race.

Aston Martin, now managed by Reg Parnell as John Wyer had moved up to be general manager, brought three works cars: their new DBR2, as well as two DBR1/300s with uprated 3.0L engines generating 245 bhp. Their regular drivers Roy Salvadori and Tony Brooks were paired with new team-members Les Leston and Noël Cunningham-Reid respectively. The one-off DBR2 used the defunct Lagonda P166 frame fitted with the 3.7L engine of the new DB4 road-car (producing 290 bhp) and given to the Whitehead brothers. The team had good reason to be confident for outright honours, after Brooks and Cunningham-Reid raced to victory over the Italians in their DBR1/300 at the most recent round of the championship: the 1000km of Nürburgring. There was also an older DB3S entered for two French gentleman-drivers filled a vacant fourth works entry.

Ferrari arrived, it hoped, with an overwhelming force of ten cars. The works team had two of their mighty new Type 335 S, with its big 4.0L V12 engine (capable of 390 PS) for their grand prix drivers: Mike Hawthorn / Luigi Musso and Peter Collins / Phil Hill - their driver ranks were sadly depleted after the deaths, earlier in the year, of works drivers Eugenio Castellotti and then Alfonso de Portago (in an accident that led to the end of the iconic Mille Miglia). The team also ran a pair of Type 250 TR prototypes testing for the upcoming CSI regulations changes. One with a 3.0L V12 for Ferrari test-driver Martino Severi and Stuart Lewis-Evans, and the other with a 3.1L V12 for Maurice Trintignant and Olivier Gendebien, who had been Ferrari's best performers in the previous year's race, finishing 4th. There were also a pair of privately entered 3.5L 290 MM and three 2.0L Testarossas (including Equipe Nationale Belge running a Jaguar, Ferrari and a Porsche to hedge their bets).

Maserati also turned up with confidence this year: Stirling Moss was now a Maserati works driver, and was to drive the coupé version (designed by Vanwall’s Frank Costin) of the 450S with French-American Harry Schell, while the spyder version was run by Jean Behra / André Simon. Its 4.5L V8 developed 420 bhp (being the biggest engine in this year’s race) although the cars still used big, obsolete drum brakes. Along with these were a 3.0L car and a pair of smaller 2.0L cars. Juan Manuel Fangio (who had won at Sebring with Behra in a 450 spyder) was present in the pit, as a ‘reserve driver’ to put concern in the opposition teams.

France, now a fading force in the major categories was only represented by a pair of Talbot-Maseratis for the Ecurie Dubonnet team and two works Gordinis (as usual, split between the S-3000 and S-2000 classes). As it turned out, this was to be the last appearance from these stalwart supporters of the race.

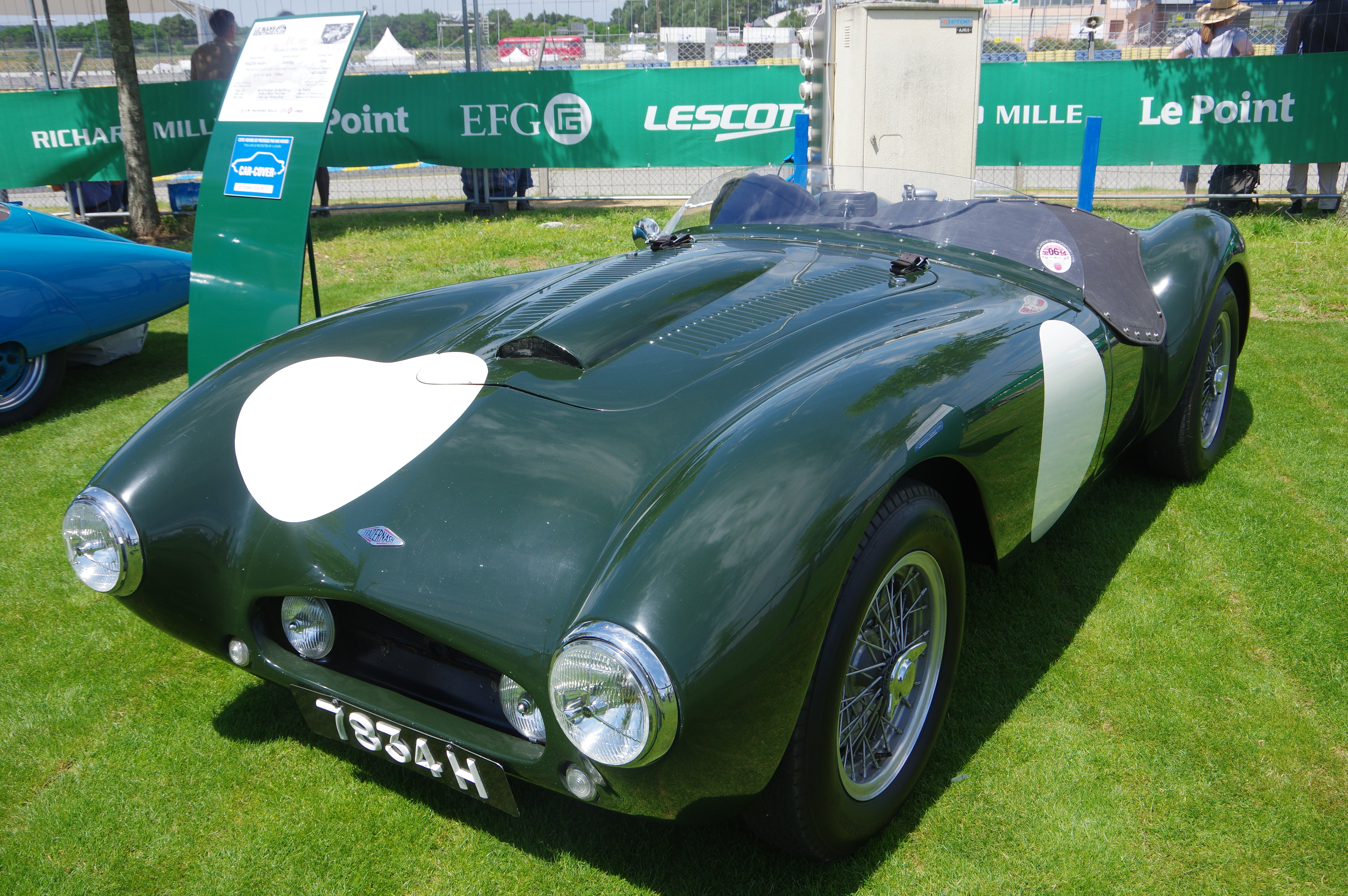
The Frazer Nash Sebring of Stoop/Jopp.

Although Bristol was no longer running, its 2.0L engine was used by Frazer Nash and debutante AC Cars to take on the five medium-engined privateer Ferraris and Maseratis in the S-2000 class. Without Lotus present, the six Porsches had the S-1500 class to themselves. The works team brought a pair of 550As as well as one of the new 718 RSK for Umberto Maglioli and East German Edgar Barth. The other three were Belgian, French and American private entrants.

The British instead pushed into the S-1100 class with the FWA-Climax engine powering the Lotus (after a class win at Sebring), Cooper and Arnott cars. They were up against a Stanguellini stepping up a class, and a 1-off appearance from Germany of an unusual, plastic DKW using its 3-cylinder 2-stroke motorcycle engine (developing less than 50 bhp!).

The smallest, S-750, class was the usual assortment of French and Italian cars except for a lone Lotus muddying the waters. Colin Chapman had convinced Coventry Climax to develop a short-stroke version of its successful FWA engine (generating 75 bhp) to take on the French in the lucrative Index of Performance (the handicap system which measured cars exceeding their specified target distance by the greatest ratio). Lotus works driver Cliff Allison, and Keith Hall, were its drivers. Lucky to reach scrutineering in time, it was presented with no exhaust and without having the engine been run.

== Practice and Pre-Race ==
A number of events were held over the race weekend to celebrate the Golden Jubilee of the ACO – postponed as they were from the previous year after the 1955 disaster. Seventy classic French cars from the very earliest years of the organisation, with drivers in period costume, did demonstration laps of the circuit in a ‘Race of Regularity’ – the winning 1908 Roland-Pillain recorded doing over 50 mph along the Mulsanne straight . This year also saw a demonstration lap performed by the first turbine car – a Renault L’Etoile Filante.

The big Italian cars set the first sub-4 minute laps in practice: Mike Hawthorn in the Ferrari, then Fangio driving Behra's Maserati spyder – his 3.58:1 being the fastest single lap of the decade. Moss had a major moment when the special new large brakes on his car locked coming up to Mulsanne corner at top speed. Getting back to the pits he got the regular brakes fitted instead. Meanwhile, the works Ferraris were fitted with experimental pistons and one of the works prototype Testarossas suffered piston failure before it could get to do any laps. It was scratched when other cars started getting similar problems and time ran out to make repairs. Severi & Lewis-Evans were allowed to change to the Type 315 S that had won that fateful Mille Miglia. It was a harbinger for bad problems to come.

The lead Ecosse Jaguar had developed a misfire in practice. After the crew fixed it, Murray took it out onto public roads to test it at 4am on race-day morning. Winding it up to its 178 mph top speed he was lucky not to be held by the gendarmerie. The Whitehead brothers found their new Aston Martin DBR2 was very quick, but deliberately eased off in practice in case team manager Reg Parnell bumped them from the car for his other drivers. In Friday practice, one of the Talbots had terminal issues and had to be scratched. It was also soon apparent that the little French cars would have a fight on their hands this year, as the small Lotus-Climax was proving to be very quick – almost 25 seconds per lap quicker. Chapman's own 1475cc Lotus had practiced faster than the Porsches in its class (and breaking the S-1500 lap record), but dropped a valve and had to be withdrawn. His American co-drivers, Herbert MacKay-Fraser and Jay Chamberlain (Lotus’ agent in California) were substituted into the team's S-1100 reserve entry. This left the S-1500 class the sole preserve of Porsche.

== Race ==
=== Start ===
Despite the poor weather leading up to race day, it began cloudy and humidly muggy. By the 4 pm start, the crowd was around 250,000. The usually quick and nimble Moss was slowed trying to squeeze into his cramped Maserati coupé so the first car to clear the startline was the Ferrari of Peter Collins, leaving a long trail of rubber, followed by the three Aston Martins. Unfortunately, the final appearance of Talbot was rather ignominious: its transmission broke as it left its start-box and it only went a handful of metres giving its driver, Bruce Halford the shortest debut on record. At the end of the first lap, Collins was in the lead (already on lap-record pace, from a standing start), followed by Brooks, Hawthorn, Gendebien and Salvadori fifth. But on the second lap Collins dropped back to tenth with engine trouble, pitting at the end of the next lap to retire with a seized piston. The Ferrari of Hawthorn had taken over the lead, hounded by the Maseratis of Moss, then Behra, at a blistering pace.

At the end of the first hour and 14 laps, Hawthorn had a 40-second lead over the Maseratis of Behra and Moss, then Gendebien, Bueb's Ecosse Jaguar and Brooks in the Aston Martin. The other Jaguars were biding their time, running just in the top-10. Soon enough, trouble struck more of the Italian cars: Moss’ Maserati began to smoke ominously and heavily, and after 26 laps, just before the two-hour mark, Hawthorn came into the pits to change tyres. The task of inserting the new spare into the Ferrari's tail took considerably longer than to change the wheel. Desperate to get back into the race, he leapt into the car – to be ordered out again smartly by a marshal. In the meantime, Behra took over the lead, and Hawthorn finally re-joined back in fifth place. In trying to catch the lead pack, Hawthorn set a new lap record with the first two sub-4 minute laps. Around 30 laps the regular pitstops and driver-changes started. The Moss Maserati, now in the hands of Harry Schell after a long pit stop costing a dozen laps, was soon to retire with rear axle trouble, just four laps after a similar issue cost their teammates Behra/Simon - forced to retire when it caused Simon to have an accident on his opening lap from the pits, splitting the fuel tank. Hawthorn refueled and handed the Ferrari over to Musso to start moving back up the field.

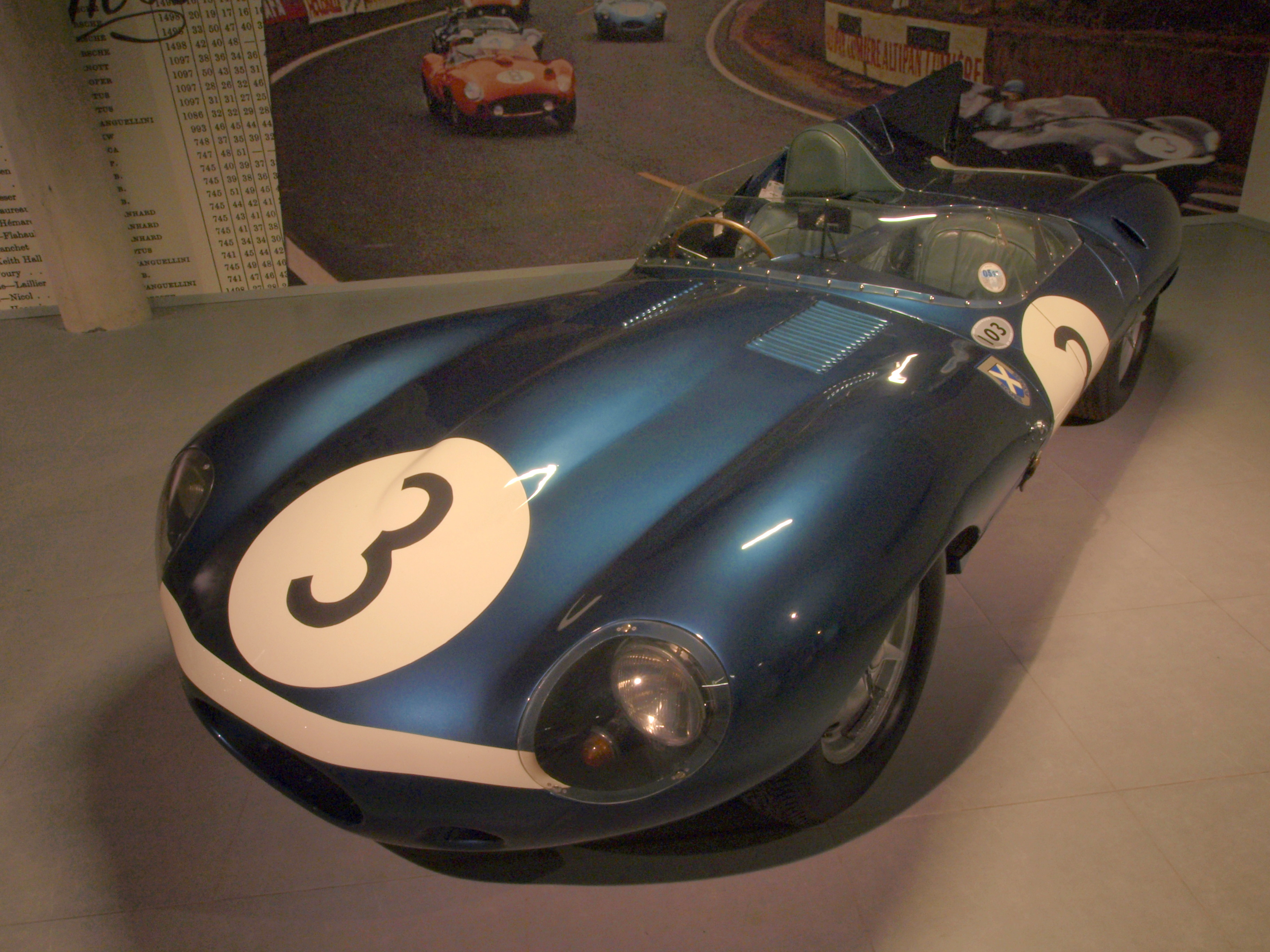
The race winning Jaguar D-Type of Flockhart/Bueb

This attrition of the Italian challengers, combined with a very rapid fuel stop, moved the Ecurie Ecosse car of Flockhart/Bueb into the lead at the start of the third hour – a lead they would not relinquish. In the fourth hour, Musso, having fought back up to second place, was hobbled by another seized piston destroying his engine out on the Mulsanne straight just before dusk. With the Severi/Lewis-Evans Ferrari held back with braking problems, this left the Gendebien/Trintignant car as the sole challenger from Maranello, who took over second place from their teammates.

Another casualty in the fourth hour was the second Gordini – the first having only lasted 3 laps – when it pulled into the pits with terminal engine issues. With dwindling funds, this was to be a disappointing end to Amedee Gordini’s long association with Le Mans.

By 9 pm, when the majority of the second fuel stops had been completed, the Ecosse Jaguar still led the race, now with Bueb back behind the wheel; Brooks, back in the Aston Martin, held second place, Gendebien in third, Masten Gregory, in Hamilton’s Jaguar was fourth with the second Ecurie Ecosse Jaguar running fifth being chased by the Severi/Lewis-Evans Ferrari making up for lost time. The works Porsches were scrapping amongst themselves, just out of the top-10, for the lead in the S-1500 and well ahead of the Belgian Testarossa leading the S-2000 class.

=== Night ===
Just before 10:30 pm, the Whitehead brothers had to retire the big Aston Martin out of the top-10 when its gearbox finally broke. When the Scarlatti/Bonnier Maserati retired with clutch failure, the works team had finished its dismal race after only 6 hours. Soon after midnight Gendebien retired out of third with a holed crankcase and yet another piston failure, leaving Ferrari’s fortunes barely any better. Salvadori retired around 2am, when the gearbox of his Aston Martin finally broke, after he had been running with only 4th gear for most of his stint. Meanwhile, the remaining Aston Martin was still lying second to Bueb’s D-Type. When Brooks took over he was four minutes behind Bueb; two hours later, he was only two minutes adrift when his gearbox also left him with only 4th gear and he started dropping back. Then at 1.50am came the most serious accident of the race: Brooks’ Aston Martin, now trailing by two laps and still stuck in 4th gear, was coming out of Tertre Rouge when he lost control, hit the bank and rolled. He was then hit by Maglioli closely following in the Porsche 718, which had been comfortably leading the S-2000 class and running 7th overall. Brooks was taken to hospital with severe cuts and bruises. This left Jaguar sitting 1-2-3-4: Ecurie Ecosse, leading from Equipe Nationale Belge, then the second Ecosse and the Los Amigos cars. Lewis-Evans, battling failing brakes, had the last works Ferrari back in 5th.

Hamilton's Jaguar that had been delayed around midnight by a burnt-through exhaust pipe which was filling the cockpit with fumes and overheating the fuel lines and burning a hole in the cockpit-floor. When Hamilton pitted, the exhaust system was welded up and the hole repaired with a plate of steel cut out of an unattended gendarmerie wagon by the “enterprising” pit-crew. The car returned to the race in 11th and set about a hard race to make up time. Meanwhile, the Lotus in the S-750 class held a comfortable margin in the Index of Performance over the OSCA, with Mackay-Fraser's Lotus and Chancel's Panhard, the best of the little French cars, battling for third.

By half-distance, the order at the top had stabilised (the leader having done 165 laps), but with the attrition of the front-runners more of the smaller cars were coming up into the top-10. With the loss of Maglioli, it was now the works Porsche of Storez/Crawford that was running in 6th having done 152 laps. The big American Ferrari of George Arents was now 7th (147 laps) then 3 laps back to the Belgian Ferrari of Bianchi/Harris in 8th, leading the S-2000 category. In 9th was the little Lotus of Mackay-Fraser/Chamberlain, leading the S-1100 class, on 141 laps and a lap back was the new AC Ace (virtually a shop-standard car) running consistently. The little DKW stopped near the pits but the driver was able to run down, pick up a fuel pump and go back and fit it himself to get back into the race.

=== Morning ===
By 5:30 am, as dawn broke the overnight mist changed to a heavy fog covering the circuit (the only bad weather of the weekend). Although at times the visibility forced drivers to slow to 50 km/h this did not dramatically affect the lap times of the Jaguars. From this point on it became a real test of endurance – with almost half the field retired or barely running. An hour later, and the lead Jaguar completed its 200th lap and holding a comfortable 5-lap lead over the field. At 6:55 am, “Freddy” Rousselle, in the Belgian Jaguar running second came to a halt at Mulsanne for nearly an hour with ignition trouble. He eventually got the car moving again and got back to the pits and later rejoined down in sixth place putting in very rapid times to haul back the leaders. By 10am, they were back up to 4th.

Although other classes had been hit by retirements, the S-2000 was still very close – the Bianchi Ferrari, running 8th overall, was still leading the class ahead of Rudd's AC, Tavano's Ferrari, Dickie Stoop's well-travelled Fraser-Nash and Guyot's Maserati. In the Index of Performance, the small Lotus still had a comfortable lead, now ahead of their bigger brother running second and the works Porsche in third. Overnight the OSCA had hit troubles and slipped back.

At three-quarter time (10am), as the fog finally lifted, the order was staying very static – the four Jaguars holding the top places over a 16-lap spread. The leader had a comfortable 7-lap advantage over its teammate running second and the others about four laps apart from each other. The Ferrari and Porsche were both on the same lap and chasing the Belgian Jaguar two laps ahead of them.

=== Finish and post-race ===
In the last hour the leading Porsche, which had been running as high as 5th, ran out of fuel near Maison Blanche. Storez pushed it back to the pit-entrance, but could not refuel (being inside its 30-lap window) and it could never be pushed around the track again meaning they could not complete the final lap in the required 30 minutes to be classified. In contrast, the little Stanguellini came into the pits stuck in top gear. Unable to restart and not allowed an assisted start from the pit-crew, the driver set about pushing the car himself: half a mile to the top of the Dunlop hill, to the great cheers of support from the crowd. Half an hour later, he was able to bump-start the car on the downhill, still stuck in top-gear, and went on to take the last finishing position.

But otherwise the leaderboard remained unchanged. At 4:00pm, the chequered flag fell and for the second year in succession, in a formation finish with his teammate, Flockhart brought a dark blue Ecurie Ecosse Jaguar D-Type first past the finish line. The winners were never challenged in a trouble-free run, except for one unscheduled stop to change a light bulb. In fact, the car spent only 13 minutes and 9 seconds on pit lane during the 24 hours! The margin of triumph over the Jaguar of Lawrence/Sanderson was eight laps.

As well as being the Ecurie Ecosse team's finest hour, it was also Jaguar's greatest triumph finishing a fine 1-2-3-4-6. Third home was the local Equipe Los Amigos Jaguar of Lucas/”Mary” who were two laps adrift. After their delays in the morning, Rousselle/Frère brought their Equipe Nationale Belge Jaguar home in fourth, 17 laps behind the winners. The Lewis-Evans Ferrari held on to fifth place ahead of the hard-charging Hamilton Jaguar just one lap behind. Hamilton's D-Type was the only one to hit serious trouble when he and Gregory had lost two hours due to electrical and exhaust problems the night before.

In the other classes, it was the privateers that saved the blushes of the works teams – the older French Aston Martin won the S-3000 class by finishing 11th. After the late demise of the Storez Porsche, it was the American Porsche coming 8th who were the sole finisher in the S-1500 keeping up Porsche's class-win tradition. Likewise, the Ferrari Testarossa of Ecurie Nationale Belge finishing 7th, won the S-2000 class by 7 laps from the AC Ace and also ahead of the S-1500s whom it had been outperformed by for almost the whole race.

Although the public glamour was associated with those that took the outright victory, the performance of the Lotus marque should not be overlooked. Four cars entered, four finished, including the little 750cc version which finished 14th and beat their French opposition to win the Index of Performance. The seal on the British success was set by the Mackay-Frazer/Chamberlain Lotus – winning the S-1100 class by a huge distance (26 laps) over its teammates, winning the Biennial Cup and 2nd on Index.

The good weather meant the winning car set a new race distance record, exceeding the previous record set in 1955 by 138 miles (222 km). Before his retirement, Mike Hawthorn put in a new lap record in his Ferrari. A special award was made to Roger Masson who had pushed his Lotus single-handedly for four miles, taking over an hour to get back to the pits after running out of petrol on the Mulsanne straight in the early hours of the race. It was refuelled and they went on to finish 16th.

As well as being the only entry for Arnott and DKW, the 1957 race was to be the last appearance for French stalwarts Talbot and Gordini – none of the cars from these manufacturers made it to the end.

== Official results ==
Results taken from Quentin Spurring's book, officially licensed by the ACO Class Winners are in Bold text.

| Pos | Class | No | Team | Drivers | Chassis | Engine | Laps |
|---|---|---|---|---|---|---|---|
| 1 | **S5.0** | 3 | (United Kingdom) **Ecurie Ecosse** | (United Kingdom) **Ron Flockhart** (United Kingdom) **Ivor Bueb** | Jaguar D-Type | Jaguar 3.8L S6 | 327 |
| 2 | S5.0 | 15 | (United Kingdom) Ecurie Ecosse | (United Kingdom) Ninian Sanderson (United Kingdom) John ‘Jock’ Lawrence | Jaguar D-Type | Jaguar 3.4L S6 | 319 |
| 3 | S5.0 | 17 | (France) Equipe Los Amigos | (France) Jean Lucas (France) ”Mary” (Jean Brussin) | Jaguar D-Type | Jaguar 3.4L S6 | 317 |
| 4 | S5.0 | 16 | (Belgium) Equipe Nationale Belge | (Belgium) Paul Frère (Belgium) Freddy Rousselle | Jaguar D-Type | Jaguar 3.4L S6 | 310 |
| 5 | S5.0 | 8 | (Italy) Scuderia Ferrari | (United Kingdom) Stuart Lewis-Evans (Italy) Martino Severi | Ferrari 315 S | Ferrari 3.8L V12 | 300 |
| 6 | S5.0 | 4 | (United Kingdom) D. Hamilton (private entrant) | (United Kingdom) Duncan Hamilton (United States) Masten Gregory | Jaguar D-Type | Jaguar 3.8L S6 | 299 |
| 7 | **S2.0** | 28 | (Belgium) Equipe Nationale Belge | (Belgium) Lucien Bianchi (Belgium) Georges Harris | Ferrari 500 TRC | Ferrari 1985cc S4 | 288 |
| 8 | **S1.5** | 35 | (United States) E. Hugus (private entrant) | (United States) Ed Hugus (Netherlands) Carel Godin de Beaufort | Porsche 550A | Porsche 1498cc S4 | 286 |
| 9 | **S1.1** | 62 (reserve) | (United Kingdom) Lotus Engineering | (United States) Jay Chamberlain (United States) Herbert MacKay-Fraser | Lotus Eleven | Coventry Climax FWA 1098cc S4 | 285 |
| 10 | S2.0 | 31 | (United Kingdom) AC Cars | (United Kingdom) Ken Rudd (United Kingdom) Peter Bolton | AC Ace | Bristol 1970cc S6 | 281 |
| N/C * | S1.5 | 34 | (West Germany) Porsche KG | (France) Claude Storez (United States) Ed Crawford | Porsche 550A | Porsche 1498cc F4 | 275 |
| 11 | **S3.0** | 21 | (United Kingdom) Aston Martin Ltd. | (France) Jean-Paul Colas (France) Jean Kerguen | Aston Martin DB3S | Aston Martin 3.0L S6 | 272 |
| 12 | S2.0 | 26 | (France) G. Guyot (private entrant) | (France) Georges Guyot (France) Michel Parsy | Maserati A6GCS | Maserati 1985cc S4 | 260 |
| 13 | S1.1 | 42 | (United Kingdom) R. Walshaw (private entrant) | (United Kingdom) Bob Walshaw (United Kingdom) John Dalton | Lotus Eleven | Coventry Climax FWA 1098cc S4 | 259 |
| 14 | **S750** | 55 | (United Kingdom) Lotus Engineering | (United Kingdom) Cliff Allison (United Kingdom) Keith Hall | Lotus Eleven | Coventry Climax FWC 744cc S4 | 259 |
| 15 | S1.1 | 40 | (United Kingdom) Cooper Cars | (Australia) Jack Brabham (United Kingdom) Ian Raby | Cooper T39 | Coventry Climax FWA 1098cc S4 | 254 |
| 16 | S1.1 | 41 | (France) A. Héchard (private entrant) | (France) André Héchard (France) Roger Masson | Lotus Eleven | Coventry Climax FWA 1098cc S4 | 253 |
| 17 | S750 | 49 | (France) Automobiles; Deutsch et Bonnet | (France) Louis Cornet (France) Henri Perrier | DB HBR-4 Spyder | Panhard 745cc F2 | 239 |
| 18 | S750 | 52 | (France) Équipe Monopole Course | (France) Pierre Chancel (France) Jean Hémard | Monopole X89 Coupé | Panhard 745cc F2 | 238 |
| 19 | S750 | 46 | (Italy) Automobili O.S.C.A. | (France) Jean Laroche (France) Rémy Radix | O.S.C.A. 750 S | OSCA 749cc S4 | 234 |
| 20 | S750 | 58 (reserve) | (Italy) Automobili Stanguellini | (France) Fernand Sigrand (France) Michel Nicol | Stanguellini S750 Sport | Stanguellini 741cc S4 | 214 |

- Note *: Ran out of fuel; Not classified because last lap too slow

== Did Not Finish ==
| Pos | Class | No | Team | Drivers | Chassis | Engine | Laps | Reason |
|---|---|---|---|---|---|---|---|---|
| DNF | S2.0 | 24 | (United Kingdom) Automobiles Frazer Nash Ltd. | (United Kingdom) Richard ‘Dickie’ Stoop (United Kingdom) Peter Jopp | Frazer Nash Sebring | Bristol 1971cc S6 | 240 | Oil leak (24hr) |
| DNF | S2.0 | 27 | (France) F. Tavano (private entrant) | (France) Fernand Tavano (France) Jacques Péron | Ferrari 500 TRC | Ferrari 1985cc S4 | 235 | Engine (22hr) |
| DNF | S750 | 53 | (France) Équipe Monopole Course | (France) Robert Chancel (France) Pierre Flahault | Monopole X88 Coupé | Panhard 745cc F2 | 230 | Engine (24hr) |
| DNF | S5.0 | 10 | (United States) G. Arents (private entrant) | (United States) George Arents (Netherlands) Jan de Vroom | Ferrari 290 MM | Ferrari 3.5L V12 | 183 | Brakes (16hr) |
| DNF | S1.1 | 45 | (Germany) W. Seidel (private entrant) | (Germany) Wolfgang Seidel (Germany) Heinz Meier | DKW Monza Coupé | DKW 994cc S3 (2-Stroke) | 151 | Engine (21hr) |
| DNF | S3.0 | 20 | (United Kingdom) Aston Martin Ltd. | (United Kingdom) Tony Brooks (United Kingdom) Noël Cunningham-Reid | Aston Martin DBR1/300 | Aston Martin 2.9L S6 | 140 | Accident (12hr) |
| DNF | S2.0 | 25 | (France) L. Coulibeuf (private entrant) | (France) Léon Coulibeuf (France) José Behra | Maserati 200S | Maserati 1998cc S4 | 136 | Fuel leak (15hr) |
| DNF | S750 | 56 | (Italy) Automobili Stanguellini | (France) René-Philippe Faure (France) Gilbert Foury | Stanguellini S750 Bialbero | Stanguellini 741cc S4 | 131 | Engine (14hr) |
| DNF | S2.0 | 29 | (France) Equipe Los Amigos | (France) François Picard (United States) Richie Ginther | Ferrari 500 TRC | Ferrari 1985cc S4 | 129 | Water pump (13hr) |
| DNF | S1.5 | 32 | (Germany) Porsche KG | (Italy) Umberto Maglioli (East Germany) Edgar Barth | Porsche 718 RSK | Porsche 1498cc F4 | 129 | Accident (12hr) |
| DNF | S750 | 54 | (France) Équipe Monopole Course | (France) René Cotton (France) Jacques Blanchet | Monopole X88 Spyder | Panhard 745cc F2 | 127 | Gearbox (14hr) |
| DNF | S750 | 50 | (France) Automobiles; Deutsch et Bonnet | (France) Jean-Claude Vidilles (France) Jo Schlesser | DB HBR-4 Spyder | Panhard 747cc F2 | 126 | Accident (14hr) |
| DNF | S750 | 51 | (France) Automobiles; Deutsch et Bonnet | (France) Paul Armagnac (France) Gérard Laureau | DB HBR-4 Spyder | Panhard 747cc F2 | 120 | Accident (15hr) |
| DNF | S3.0 | 19 | (United Kingdom) Aston Martin Ltd. | (United Kingdom) Roy Salvadori (United Kingdom) Les Leston | Aston Martin DR1/300 | Aston Martin 2.9L S6 | 112 | Oil pipe (10hr) |
| DNF | S5.0 | 9 | (Italy) Scuderia Ferrari | (Belgium) Olivier Gendebien (France) Maurice Trintignant | Ferrari 250 TR | Ferrari 3.1L V12 | 109 | Piston (10hr) |
| DNF | S1.5 | 33 | (Germany) Porsche KG | (Germany) Hans Herrmann (Germany) Richard von Frankenberg | Porsche 500A | Porsche 1498cc F4 | 87 | Ignition (8hr) |
| DNF | S5.0 | 5 | (United Kingdom) Aston Martin Ltd. | (United Kingdom) Peter Whitehead (United Kingdom) Graham Whitehead | Aston Martin DBR2 | Aston Martin 3.7L S6 | 81 | Gearbox (8hr) |
| DNF | S5.0 | 11 | (Belgium) Equipe Nationale Belge | (Belgium) Jacques Swaters (Belgium) Alain de Changy | Ferrari 290 MM | Ferrari 3.5L V12 | 73 | Engine (9hr) |
| DNF | S3.0 | 12 | (Italy) Officine Alfieri Maserati | (Italy) Giorgio Scarlatti (Sweden) Joakim ‘Jo’ Bonnier | Maserati 300S | Maserati 3.0L S6 | 73 | Clutch (7hr) |
| DSQ | S1.5 | 60 (reserve) | (Belgium) Equipe Nationale Belge | (Belgium) Claude Dubois (Belgium) George Hacquin | Porsche 550A | Porsche 1498cc F4 | 70 | Premature refuel (8hr) |
| DNF | S750 | 57 (reserve) | (France) B. Deviterne (private entrant) | (France) Bernard Deviterne (France) Marcel Laillier | DB HBR-5 Coupé | Panhard 747cc F2 | 68 | Engine (9hr) |
| DNF | S1.1 | 44 | (Italy) Automobili Stanguellini | (Italy) Francesco Siracusa (Italy) Roberto Lippi | Stanguellini S1100 Prototipo | Stanguellini 1089cc S4 | 67 | Ignition (8hr) |
| DNF | S5.0 | 7 | (Italy) Scuderia Ferrari | (United Kingdom) Mike Hawthorn (Italy) Luigi Musso | Ferrari 335 S | Ferrari 4.0L V12 | 56 | Piston (5hr) |
| DNF | S1.1 | 39 | (United Kingdom) Arnott Cars | (United Kingdom) Jim Russell (United Kingdom) Dennis Taylor | Arnott Sports | Climax FWA 1098cc S4 | 46 | Ignition (6hr) |
| DNF | S3.0 | 18 | (France) Automobiles Gordini | (France) Jean Guichet (France) André Guelfi | Gordini T24S | Gordini 3.0L S8 | 38 | Engine (4hr) |
| DNF | S5.0 | 1 | (Italy) Officine Alfieri Maserati | (United Kingdom) Stirling Moss (United States) Harry Schell | Maserati 450S Zagato Coupé | Maserati 4.5L V8 | 32 | Transmission (4hr) |
| DNF | S5.0 | 2 | (Italy) Officine Alfieri Maserati | (France) Jean Behra (France) André Simon | Maserati 450S Spyder | Maserati 4.5L V8 | 28 | Transmission, accident (3hr) |
| DNF | S1.5 | 36 | (France) M. Slotine (private entrant) | (France) Maurice Slotine (France) Roland Bourel | Porsche 356A | Porsche 1498cc F4 | 26 | Piston (4hr) |
| DNF | S2.0 | 61 (reserve) | (Austria) G. Köchert (private entrant) | (Austria) Gotfrid Köchert (Germany) Erwin Bauer | Ferrari 500 TRC | Ferrari 1985cc S4 | 18 | Out of fuel (3hr) |
| DNF | S750 | 47 | (France) Automobiles V.P. | (France) Bernard Consten (France) Jean-Marie Dumazer | V.P. 166R Dynamique | Renault 747cc S4 | 15 | Engine (3hr) |
| DNF | S2.0 | 30 | (France) Automobiles Gordini | (France) Clarence de Rinen (Morocco) Robert La Caze | Gordini T15S | Gordini 1988cc S6 | 3 | Engine (1hr) |
| DNF | S5.0 | 6 | (Italy) Scuderia Ferrari | (United Kingdom) Peter Collins (United States) Phil Hill | Ferrari 335 S | Ferrari 4.0L V12 | 2 | Piston (1hr) |
| DNF | S3.0 | 23 | (France) Ecurie Dubonnet | (Italy) Franco Bordoni (United Kingdom) Bruce Halford | Talbot-Lago Sport 2500 | Maserati 2.5L S6 | 0 | Transmission (1hr) |

== Did Not Start ==
| Pos | Class | No | Team | Drivers | Chassis | Engine | Reason |
|---|---|---|---|---|---|---|---|
| DNS | S5.0 | 8 | (Italy) Scuderia Ferrari | (United Kingdom) Stuart Lewis-Evans (Italy) Martino Severi | Ferrari 315 S | Ferrari 3.8L V12 | Practice - Piston |
| DNS | S3.0 | 22 | (France) Ecurie Dubonnet | (Italy) Jean Blanc (France) Georges Burggraff | Talbot-Lago Sport 2500 | Maserati 2.5L S6 | Practice - Mechanical |
| DNS | S1.5 | 37 | (United Kingdom) Lotus Engineering | (United States) Jay Chamberlain (United States) Herbert MacKay-Fraser (United Kingdom) Colin Chapman | Lotus Eleven | Coventry Climax FPF; 1475cc S4 | Practice - Engine |
| DNA | S1.5 | 38 | (Italy) A. Pagani (private entrant) | (Italy) Alfranco Pagani (Italy) Mario Poltronieri | Alfa Romeo Giulietta Sebring | Alfa Romeo 1290cc S4 | withdrawn |
| DNA | S1.1 | 43 | (Italy) Automobili O.S.C.A. | (Italy) Guilio Cabianca (United Kingdom) Colin Davis | O.S.C.A. MT-4 | OSCA 1098cc S4 | withdrawn |
| DNA | S750 | 48 | (France) J. Dewez (private entrant) | (France) ”Franc” (Jacques Dewez) (France) Robert Schollmann | Renault 4CV Spéciale | Renault 747cc S4 | withdrawn |

== Index of Performance ==
| Pos | Class | No | Team | Drivers | Chassis | Score |
|---|---|---|---|---|---|---|
| 1 | S750 | 55 | (United Kingdom) Lotus Engineering | (United Kingdom) Cliff Allison (United Kingdom) Keith Hall | Lotus Eleven | 1.308 |
| 2 | S1.1 | 62 | (United Kingdom) Lotus Engineering | (United States) Jay Chamberlain (United States) Herbert MacKay-Fraser | Lotus Eleven | 1.260 |
| 3 | S750 | 49 | (France) Automobiles; Deutsch et Bonnet | (France) Louis Cornet (France) Henri Perrier | DB HBR-4 Spyder | 1.208 |
| 4 | S750 | 52 | (France) Équipe Monopole Course | (France) Pierre Chancel (France) Jean Hémard | Monopole X89 Coupé | 1.201 |
| 5 | S5.0 | 3 | (United Kingdom) Ecurie Ecosse | (United Kingdom) Ron Flockhart (United Kingdom) Ivor Bueb | Jaguar D-Type | 1.190 |
| 6 | S1.5 | 35 | (United States) E. Hugus (private entrant) | (United States) Ed Hugus (Netherlands) Carel Godin de Beaufort | Porsche 550A | 1.176 |
| 7 | S750 | 46 | (Italy) Automobili O.S.C.A. | (France) Jean Laroche (France) Rémy Radix | O.S.C.A. 750 S | 1.176 |
| 8 | S5.0 | 15 | (United Kingdom) Ecurie Ecosse | (United Kingdom) Ninian Sanderson (United Kingdom) John ‘Jock’ Lawrence | Jaguar D-Type | 1.170 |
| 9 | S5.0 | 17 | (France) Equipe Los Amigos | (France) Jean Lucas (France) ”Mary” (Jean Brussin) | Jaguar D-Type | 1.161 |
| 10 | S1.1 | 42 | (United Kingdom) R. Walshaw (private entrant) | (United Kingdom) Bob Walshaw (United Kingdom) John Dalton | Lotus Eleven | 1.145 |

- Note: Only the top ten positions are included in this set of standings. A score of 1.00 means meeting the minimum distance for the car, and a higher score is exceeding the nominal target distance.

== 23rd Rudge-Whitworth Biennial Cup (1956/1957) ==
| Pos | Class | No | Team | Drivers | Chassis | Score |
|---|---|---|---|---|---|---|
| 1 | S1.1 | 62 | (United Kingdom) Lotus Engineering | (United States) Jay Chamberlain (United States) Herbert MacKay-Fraser | Lotus Eleven | 1.260 |
| 2 | S750 | 49 | (France) Automobiles; Deutsch et Bonnet | (France) Louis Cornet (France) Henri Perrier | DB HBR-4 Spyder | 1.208 |
| 3 | S750 | 52 | (France) Équipe Monopole Course | (France) Pierre Chancel (France) Jean Hémard | Monopole X89 Coupé | 1.201 |

- Note: Only the top three positions are included in this set of standings.

== Statistics ==
Taken from Quentin Spurring's book, officially licensed by the ACO

- Fastest Lap in practice – Fangio, #2 Maserati 450S Spyder – 3m 58.1s; 203.53 kp/h (126.46 mph)
- Fastest Lap: Hawthorn, #7 Ferrari 335 S - 3:58.7secs 203.20 kp/h (126.15 mph)
- Distance - 4,397.11 km (2,732.24 mi)
- Winner's Average Speed - 183.22 km/h (113.85 mph)
- Attendance – 250 000. (or >150 000)

== Standings after the race ==
| Pos | Championship | Points |
|---|---|---|
| 1 | (Italy) Ferrari | 25 (27) |
| 2 | (Italy) Maserati | 19 |
| 3 | (United Kingdom) Jaguar | 15 |
| 4 | (United Kingdom) Aston Martin | 8 |
| 5 | (West Germany) Porsche | 5 |
| 6 | (Italy) O.S.C.A. | 1 |

- Note: Championship points were awarded for the first six places in each race in the order of 8-6-4-3-2-1. Manufacturers were only awarded points for their highest finishing car with no points awarded for positions filled by additional cars. Only the best 4 results out of the 7 races could be retained by each manufacturer. Points earned but not counted towards the championship totals are listed within brackets in the above table.

Citations

World Sportscar Championship
| Previous race: 1000km of Nürburgring | 1957 season | Next race: Swedish Grand Prix |
