= Paul Frère =

Belgian racing driver and automotive journalist (1917–2008)

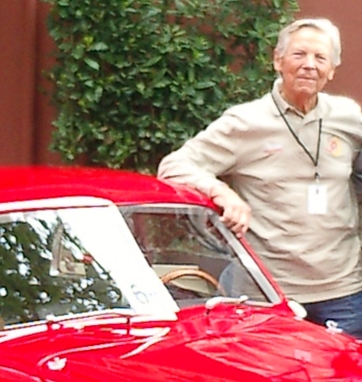
- Paul Frère in 2003
- Born: 30 January 1917; Le Havre, France
- Died: 23 February 2008 (aged 91); Saint-Paul-de-Vence, France

Formula One World Championship career
- Nationality: (Belgium) Belgian
- Active years: 1952–1956
- Team(s): HWM, Gordini, Ferrari
- Entries: 11
- Championships: 0
- Wins: 0
- Podiums: 1
- Career points: 11
- Pole positions: 0
- Fastest laps: 0
- First entry: 1952 Belgian Grand Prix
- Last entry: 1956 Belgian Grand Prix

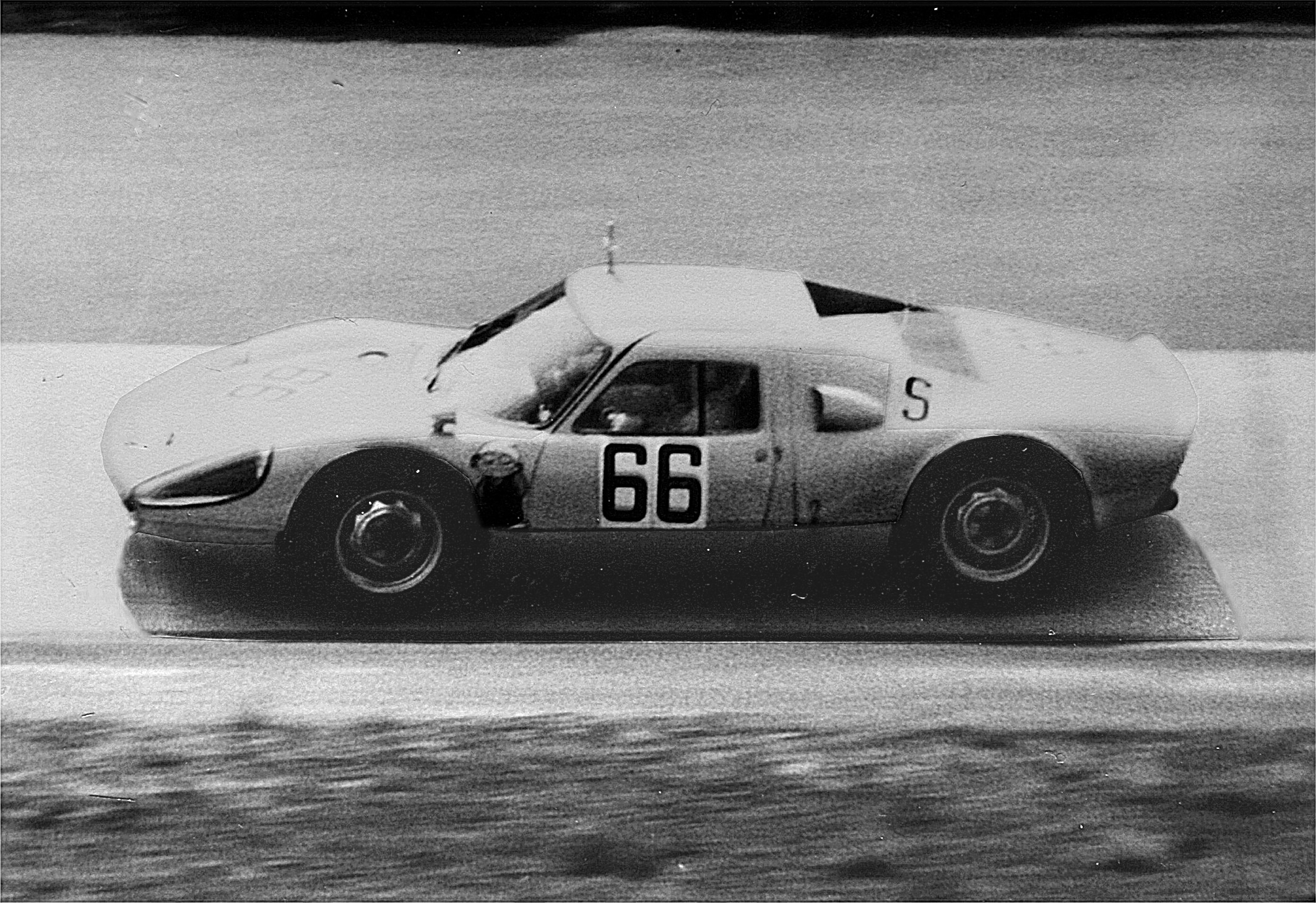
Porsche 904

Paul Frère (French pronunciation: [pɔl fʁɛʁ]; 30 January 1917 – 23 February 2008) was a racing driver and journalist from Belgium. He participated in eleven World Championship Formula One Grands Prix debuting on 22 June 1952 and achieving one podium finish with a total of eleven championship points. He drove in several non-Championship Formula One races, winning the 1952 Grand Prix des Frontières and 1960 VI South African Grand Prix.

Frère also won the 1960 24 Hours of Le Mans, driving for Ferrari with fellow Belgian teammate Olivier Gendebien.

== Life ==
Frère was born at Le Havre in 1917.

Frère drove for the Ferrari works team, with Peter Collins.

After retiring from active racing in 1960, Frère worked as an automotive journalist based in Europe (he was the European Editor for Road & Track magazine). He had numerous acquaintances amongst vehicle design engineers, especially in Japan at Honda and Mazda and also worked as a consultant to automobile manufacturers. He also had the opportunity to test numerous road and racing cars as a journalist, one of the highlights being the Audi R8 which he tested and demonstrated during a break in the proceedings of the Test Day of the 2003 24 Hours of Le Mans. At the time he was 86 years old, making him the oldest racing driver to drive a then-current sportscar.

Frère, along with Piero Taruffi and Denis Jenkinson, was one of the first writers to treat motor racing as a skill that could be analyzed, explained, and taught. His 1963 book, Sports Car and Competition Driving is still a standard reference in the field. It influenced the development of competition driving schools, such as those founded by Jim Russell, Bob Bondurant and many others.

Frère was an expert on Porsche cars, in particular the Porsche 911, writing the definitive book on this series, The Porsche 911 Story. He maintained a close relationship with Porsche over the years. He was also considered an advisor and expert on the 911 by Alois Ruf, a respected Porsche tuner and manufacturer as head of Ruf Automobile, who consulted Frère during the development of Ruf's RGT8 Model.

In 1967, Frère had a cameo appearance in The Departure, a Belgian film about a car-obsessed young man trying to get possession of a Porsche 911 for a race.

Only weeks before his 90th birthday in January 2007, Frère was badly injured in an accident near the Nürburgring and was hospitalized for 14 days in intensive care.

Frère died on 23 February 2008 in Saint-Paul-de-Vence (France). Turn 15 at the Circuit de Spa-Francorchamps, formerly the first part of the Stavelot corner, has been renamed in his honour.

== Rowing champion ==
Frère was also a successful rower winning three Belgian championships. In 1946 and 1947, he won the national title in a coxless four. In 1946, he also won it with the coxed four.

== Racing record ==
=== Complete Formula One World Championship results ===
(key) (Races in bold indicate pole position)

Year	Team	Chassis	Engine	1	2	3	4	5	6	7	8	9	WDC	Points
1952	HW Motors Ltd	HWM 52	Alta 2.0 L4	SUI	500	BEL; 5	FRA	GBR	GER; Ret				16th	2
1952	Ecurie Belge	Simca-Gordini T15	Gordini 1.5 L4							NED; Ret	ITA		16th	2
1953	HW Motors Ltd	HWM 53	Alta 2.0 L4	ARG	500	NED	BEL; 10	FRA	GBR	GER	SUI; Ret	ITA	NC	0
1954	Equipe Gordini	Gordini T16	Gordini 2.0 L6	ARG	500	BEL; Ret	FRA; Ret	GBR	GER; Ret	SUI	ITA	ESP	NC	0
1955	Scuderia Ferrari	Ferrari 555	Ferrari 106 2.5 L4	ARG	MON; 8*	500	BEL; 4	NED	GBR	ITA			15th	3
1956	Scuderia Ferrari	Lancia Ferrari D50	Lancia Ferrari DS50 2.5 V8	ARG	MON	500	BEL; 2	FRA	GBR	GER	ITA		7th	6

* Shared drive with Piero Taruffi

=== Complete 24 Hours of Le Mans results ===
Year	Team	Co-Drivers	Car	Class	Laps	Pos.	Class Pos.
1953	(West Germany) Porsche KG	(West Germany) Richard von Frankenberg	Porsche 550 Coupé	S1.5	247	15th	**1st**
1954	(United Kingdom) Aston Martin Lagonda	(United States) Carroll Shelby	Aston Martin DB3S	S3.0	74	DNF (Front axle)	
1955	(United Kingdom) Aston Martin Lagonda Ltd	(United Kingdom) Peter Collins	Aston Martin DB3S	S3.0	302	**2nd**	**1st**
1956	(United Kingdom) Jaguar Cars Ltd.	(United Kingdom) Desmond Titterington	Jaguar D-Type	S5.0	2	DNF (Accident)	
1957	(Belgium) Equipe Nationale Belge	(Belgium) Freddy Rousselle	Jaguar D-Type	S5.0	310	4th	4th
1958	(West Germany) Porsche KG	(East Germany) Edgar Barth	Porsche 718 RSK	S1.5	290	4th	**1st**
1959	(United Kingdom) David Brown Racing Dept	(France) Maurice Trintignant	Aston Martin DBR1/300	S3.0	322	**2nd**	**2nd**
1960	(Italy) Scuderia Ferrari	(Belgium) Olivier Gendebien	Ferrari 250 TR59/60	S3.0	314	**1st**	**1st**

=== Complete 12 Hours of Sebring results ===
Year	Team	Co-Drivers	Car	Class	Laps	Pos.	Class Pos.
1957	(France) Renault Company	(France) Jean Lucas	Renault Dauphine	T1.0	134	NC	

Sporting positions
Preceded by Carroll Shelby; Roy Salvadori	Winner of the 24 Hours of Le Mans; 1960; With: Olivier Gendebien	Succeeded by Olivier Gendebien; Phil Hill
