= 1957 French Grand Prix =

← Previous race	Next race →
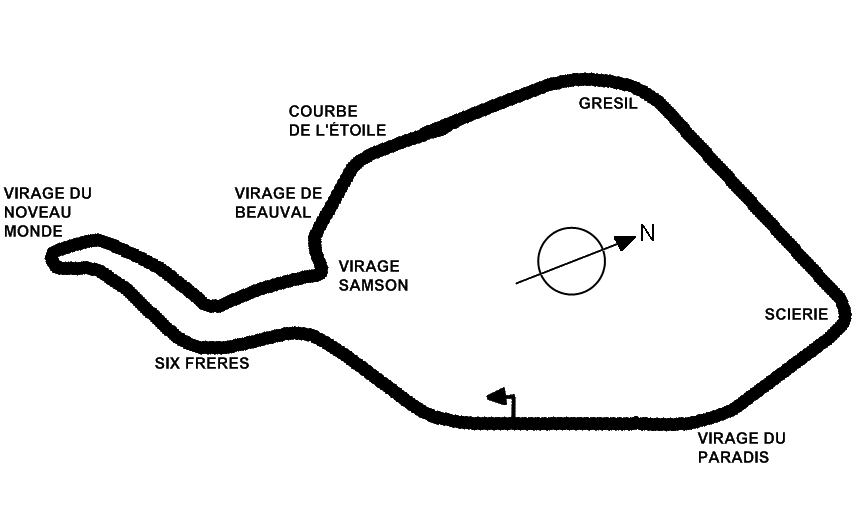

Race details
- Date: 7 July 1957
- Official name: XLIII Grand Prix de l'ACF
- Location: Rouen-Les-Essarts, Grand-Couronne, France
- Course: Permanent racing facility
- Course length: 6.542 km (4.065 miles)
- Distance: 77 laps, 503.734 km (313.005 miles)

Pole position
Driver	(Argentina) Juan Manuel Fangio	Maserati
- Time: 2:21.5

Fastest lap
Driver	(Italy) Luigi Musso	Ferrari
- Time: 2:22.4

Podium
First	(Argentina) Juan Manuel Fangio	Maserati
Second	(Italy) Luigi Musso	Ferrari
Third	(United Kingdom) Peter Collins	Ferrari

The 1957 French Grand Prix was a Formula One motor race held on 7 July 1957 at Rouen-Les-Essarts. It was race 4 of 8 in the 1957 World Championship of Drivers.

== Classification ==
=== Qualifying ===
Pos	No	Driver	Constructor	Time	Gap
1	2	(Argentina) Juan Manuel Fangio	Maserati	2:21.5	—
2	4	(France) Jean Behra	Maserati	2:22.6	+1.1
3	10	(Italy) Luigi Musso	Ferrari	2:22.7	+1.2
4	6	(United States) Harry Schell	Maserati	2:23.2	+1.7
5	12	(United Kingdom) Peter Collins	Ferrari	2:23.3	+1.8
6	20	(United Kingdom) Roy Salvadori	Vanwall	2:25.1	+3.6
7	14	(United Kingdom) Mike Hawthorn	Ferrari	2:25.6	+4.1
8	16	(France) Maurice Trintignant	Ferrari	2:25.9	+4.4
9	8	(Argentina) Carlos Menditeguy	Maserati	2:26.1	+4.6
10	18	(United Kingdom) Stuart Lewis-Evans	Vanwall	2:27.6	+6.1
11	26	(United Kingdom) Ron Flockhart	BRM	2:27.8	+6.3
12	28	(United States) Herbert MacKay-Fraser	BRM	2:29.9	+8.4
13	22	(Australia) Jack Brabham	Cooper-Climax	2:30.9	+9.4
14	30	(United Kingdom) Horace Gould	Maserati	2:35.0	+13.5
15	24	(United Kingdom) Mike MacDowel	Cooper-Climax	2:38.6	+17.1

=== Race ===
Pos	No	Driver	Constructor	Laps	Time/Retired	Grid	Points
1	2	(Argentina) Juan Manuel Fangio	Maserati	77	3:07:46.4	1	8
2	10	(Italy) Luigi Musso	Ferrari	77	+50.8 secs	3	7^{1}
3	12	(United Kingdom) Peter Collins	Ferrari	77	+2:06.0	5	4
4	14	(United Kingdom) Mike Hawthorn	Ferrari	76	+1 Lap	7	3
5	6	(United States) Harry Schell	Maserati	70	+7 Laps	4	2
6	4	(France) Jean Behra	Maserati	69	+8 Laps	2	
7	24	(United Kingdom) Mike MacDowel (Australia) Jack Brabham	Cooper-Climax	68	+9 Laps	15	
Ret	8	(Argentina) Carlos Menditeguy	Maserati	30	Engine	9	
Ret	18	(United Kingdom) Stuart Lewis-Evans	Vanwall	30	Steering	10	
Ret	20	(United Kingdom) Roy Salvadori	Vanwall	25	Engine	6	
Ret	28	(United States) Herbert MacKay-Fraser	BRM	24	Transmission	12	
Ret	16	(France) Maurice Trintignant	Ferrari	23	Electrical	8	
Ret	22	(Australia) Jack Brabham	Cooper-Climax	4	Accident	13	
Ret	30	(United Kingdom) Horace Gould	Maserati	4	Halfshaft	14	
Ret	26	(United Kingdom) Ron Flockhart	BRM	2	Accident	11	

Notes

- ^1 – Includes 1 point for fastest lap

== Notes ==
- This was the first Formula One World Championship race for American driver Herbert MacKay-Fraser and British driver Mike MacDowel.

== Shared drive ==
- Car #24: Mike MacDowel (30 laps) and Jack Brabham (38 laps).

== Championship standings after the race ==
Drivers' Championship standings

	Pos	Driver	Points
	1	(Argentina) Juan Manuel Fangio	25
	2	(United States) Sam Hanks	8
34	3	(Italy) Luigi Musso	7
1	4	(United States) Jim Rathmann	7
1	5	(France) Jean Behra	6

- Note: Only the top five positions are included.

Previous race: 1957 Indianapolis 500	FIA Formula One World Championship; 1957 season	Next race: 1957 British Grand Prix
Previous race: 1956 French Grand Prix	French Grand Prix	Next race: 1958 French Grand Prix
