= Lotus Mark II =

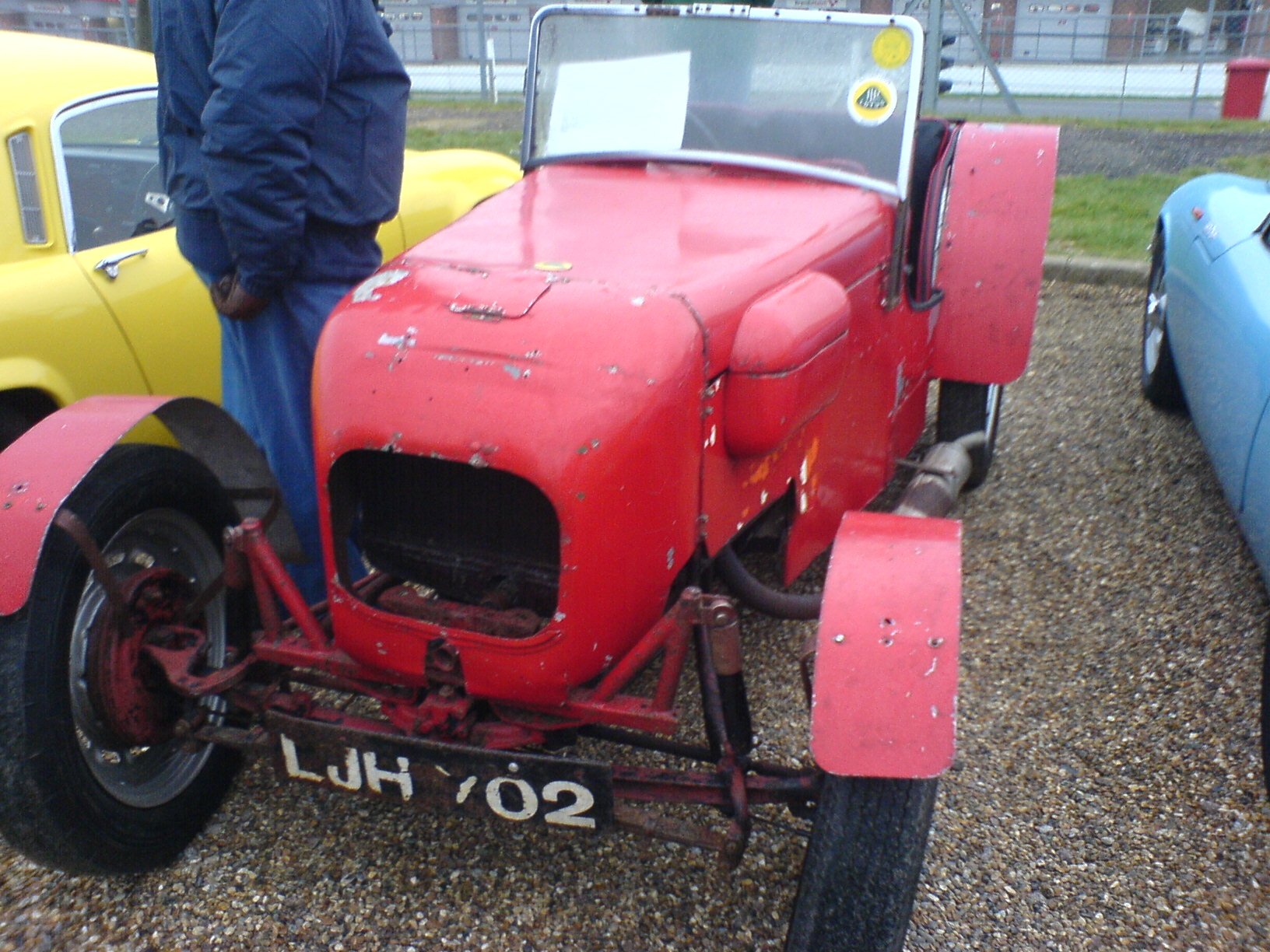
Lotus Mark II

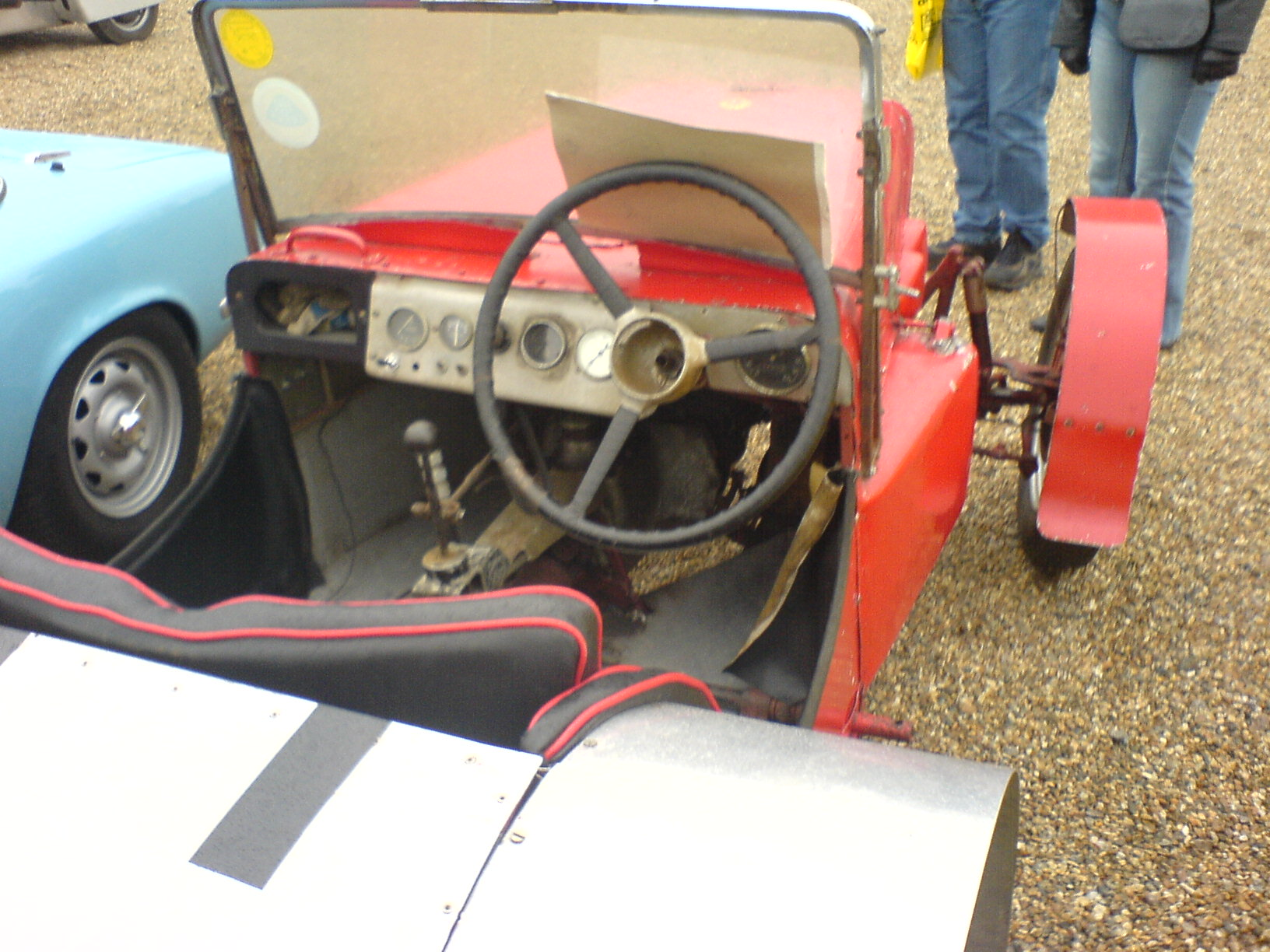
Lotus Mark II cockpit

The car that came to be known as the Lotus Mark II was created in 1949, while Colin Chapman was serving with the RAF. For his second car Chapman built on the knowledge gained from building and competing in the Lotus Mark I, so he again used the widely available and inexpensive Austin 7 chassis as a starting point. He boxed in the chassis rails and replaced the cross members with stronger tubular braces. He swapped the Austin engine for a Ford engine and transmission, first from a Ford 8, then from a Ford 10, but retained the Austin 7 rear axle. To be able to use a wider tyre, Chapman adapted Ford pressed-steel wheels. He modified the engine as far as the club rules would allow.

Chapman used this chassis and running gear to support a cigar-shaped body with a rounded nose. It has rudimentary cycle-type mudguards. The result was a very competitive trials car, but one also suitable for circuit racing. Chapman used the car to compete in events sponsored by the 750 Motor Club. Although Chapman built the car to compete in English Trials events, he also entered the car in track events, such as Silverstone, where he won in his class. From that point forward, Chapman concentrated on designing and constructing cars for race circuits instead of trials.

Ford Sidevalve Motor:

- Config: S4 SV
- Displacement: 1172 cc
- Bore/Stroke: 63.5 mm (2.5 in) x 92.456 mm (3.6 in)
