= Jay Chamberlain =

American racing driver (1925–2001)

- Born: December 29, 1925; Los Angeles, California, U.S.
- Died: August 1, 2001 (aged 75); Tucson, Arizona, U.S.

Formula One World Championship career
- Nationality: (United States) American
- Active years: 1962
- Team: (non-works Lotus)
- Entries: 3 (1 start)
- Championships: 0
- Wins: 0
- Podiums: 0
- Career points: 0
- Pole positions: 0
- Fastest laps: 0
- First entry: 1962 British Grand Prix
- Last entry: 1962 Italian Grand Prix

Jay Clifford Chamberlain (December 29, 1925 – August 1, 2001) was a racing driver from the United States.

== Career ==
He participated in three World Championship Formula One Grands Prix, debuting on July 21, 1962. He scored no championship points. He also participated in numerous non-Championship Formula One races.

Chamberlain finished ninth overall at Le Mans in 1957, but first in class, driving a Lotus Eleven, sharing with Herbert MacKay-Fraser; the duo won the Coupe Biennale as a result. Chamberlain of Burbank, California, was the United States distributor for Lotus cars.

== Racing record ==
=== 24 Hours of Le Mans results ===
Year	Team	Co-Drivers	Car	Class	Laps	Pos.	Class Pos.
1957	(United Kingdom) Lotus Engineering	(United States) Herbert MacKay-Fraser	Lotus Eleven	S1.1	285	9th	**1st**
1958	(United Kingdom) Lotus Engineering	(United States) Pete Lovely	Lotus 15	S1.5	39	DNF	DNF

=== Complete Formula One results ===
(key)

Year	Entrant	Chassis	Engine	1	2	3	4	5	6	7	8	9	WDC	Points
1962	Ecurie Excelsior	Lotus 18	Climax Straight-4	NED	MON	BEL	FRA	GBR; 15	GER; DNQ	ITA; DNQ	USA	RSA	NC	0

=== Complete Formula One Non-Championship results ===
(key) (Races in bold indicate pole position) (Races in italics indicate fastest lap)

Year	Entrant	Chassis	Engine	1	2	3	4	5	6	7	8	9	10	11	12	13	14	15	16	17	18	19	20
1962	Ecurie Excelsior	Lotus 18	Climax Straight-4	CAP	BRX	LOM	LAV; 5	GLV; Ret	PAU	AIN; Ret	INT; 16	NAP; DNQ	MAL	CLP; Ret	RMS	SOL	KAN	MED; DNA	DAN; 9	OUL; 9	MEX	RAN	NAT
