= Herbert MacKay-Fraser =

American racing driver (1922–1957)

- Born: June 23, 1922; Recife, Pernambuco, Brazil
- Died: July 14, 1957 (aged 35); Reims, France

Formula One World Championship career
- Nationality: (United States) American
- Active years: 1957
- Team: BRM
- Entries: 1
- Championships: 0
- Wins: 0
- Podiums: 0
- Career points: 0
- Pole positions: 0
- Fastest laps: 0
- First entry: 1957 French Grand Prix

Herbert MacKay-Fraser (June 23, 1922 – July 14, 1957) was a racing driver from the United States, born in Recife, Pernambuco, Brazil. He participated in one Formula One World Championship grand prix, the 1957 French Grand Prix, on July 7, 1957. He retired from the race and scored no championship points. A week later he was killed in the Coupe de Vitesse at Reims-Gueux, when he crashed his Lotus.

== Racing record ==
=== 24 Hours of Le Mans results ===
Year	Team	Co-Drivers	Car	Class	Laps	Pos.	Class Pos.
1956	(United Kingdom) Lotus Engineering	(United Kingdom) Colin Chapman	Lotus Eleven	S1.5	172	DNF	DNF
1957	(United Kingdom) Lotus Engineering	(United States) Jay Chamberlain	Lotus Eleven	S1.1	285	9th	1st

=== Complete Formula One World Championship results ===
(key)

Year	Entrant	Chassis	Engine	1	2	3	4	5	6	7	8	WDC	Points
1957	Owen Racing Organisation	BRM P25	BRM Straight-4	ARG	MON	500	FRA; Ret	GBR	GER	PES	ITA	NC	0
