= 1956 Belgian Grand Prix =

← Previous race	Next race →
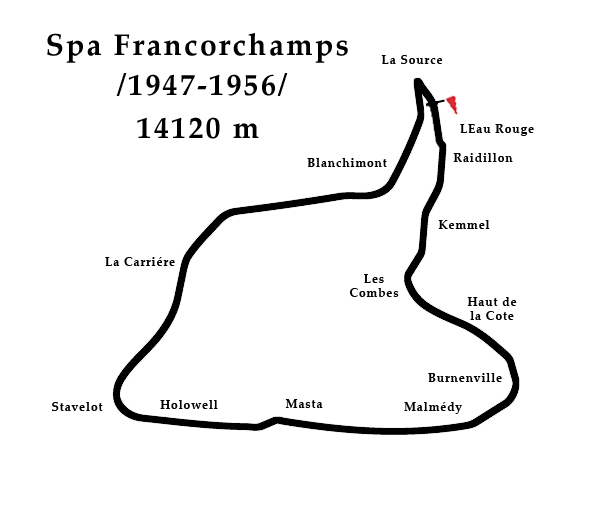
- Spa-Francorchamps layout

Race details
- Date: June 3, 1956
- Official name: XVIII Grand Prix de Belgique
- Location: Circuit de Spa-Francorchamps
- Course: Permanent racing facility
- Course length: 14.120 km (8.774 miles)
- Distance: 36 laps, 508.320 km (315.855 miles)
- Weather: Wet and overcast, later drying

Pole position
Driver	(Argentina) Juan Manuel Fangio	Ferrari
- Time: 4:09.8

Fastest lap
Driver	(United Kingdom) Stirling Moss	Maserati
- Time: 4:14.7

Podium
First	(United Kingdom) Peter Collins	Ferrari
Second	(Belgium) Paul Frère	Ferrari
Third	(Italy) Cesare Perdisa (United Kingdom) Stirling Moss	Maserati

The 1956 Belgian Grand Prix was a Formula One motor race held on 3 June 1956 at Spa-Francorchamps. It was race 4 of 8 in the 1956 World Championship of Drivers.

After the first day of practice on Thursday, Fangio was on pole with a time almost 5 sec faster than second place Moss. These times would not be touched with wet conditions on Friday and windy conditions on Saturday.

It was raining when the race began and Fangio made a poor start and settled in fifth with Moss well in the lead. But by lap 3 Fangio would be in second having passed Behra, Collins, and then Castellotti. By the fifth lap he was in the lead and had opened up an 8-second lead on Moss by lap 10 with Collins third on a drying track. Collins took second when Moss lost a back wheel on the climb after the Eau Rouge bridge. He was able to safely stop and sprint back to the pits and take over Perdisa's car. He resumed in sixth but a lap down to the leaders. Collins took the lead for good when Fangio lost his transmission on lap 24. A tight battle for second between Behra and Frere ended when Behra's engine began to misfire. This allowed Moss to move to third as he had passed Schell earlier. Moss ended the race on a furious pace but the two leaders were too far ahead to make up the gap.

This was the first Formula One podium for a Belgian driver.

== Classification ==
=== Qualifying ===
Pos	No	Driver	Constructor	Time	Gap
1	2	(Argentina) Juan Manuel Fangio	Ferrari	4:09.8	—
2	30	(United Kingdom) Stirling Moss	Maserati	4:14.7	+4.9
3	8	(United Kingdom) Peter Collins	Ferrari	4:15.3	+5.5
4	32	(France) Jean Behra	Maserati	4:16.7	+6.9
5	4	(Italy) Eugenio Castellotti	Ferrari	4:16.7	+6.9
6	10	(United States) Harry Schell	Vanwall	4:19.0	+9.2
7	12	(France) Maurice Trintignant	Vanwall	4:22.8	+13.0
8	6	(Belgium) Paul Frère	Ferrari	4:23.8	+14.0
9	34	(Italy) Cesare Perdisa	Maserati	4:35.7	+25.9
10	24	(France) Louis Rosier	Maserati	4:35.9	+26.1
11	22	(Italy) Luigi Villoresi	Maserati	4:37.7	+27.9
12	28	(Italy) Piero Scotti	Connaught-Alta	4:41.9	+32.1
13	38	(United Kingdom) Mike Hawthorn	Maserati	4:48.9	+39.1
14	36	(Spain) Paco Godia	Maserati	4:49.8	+40.0
15	26	(United Kingdom) Horace Gould	Maserati	4:50.4	+40.6
16	20	(Belgium) André Pilette	Ferrari	4:51.9	+42.1

=== Race ===
Pos	No	Driver	Constructor	Laps	Time/Retired	Grid	Points
1	8	(United Kingdom) Peter Collins	Ferrari	36	2:40:00.3	3	8
2	6	(Belgium) Paul Frère	Ferrari	36	+1:51.3	8	6
3	34	(Italy) Cesare Perdisa (United Kingdom) Stirling Moss	Maserati	36	+3:16.6	9	2; 3^{1}
4	10	(United States) Harry Schell	Vanwall	35	+1 Lap	6	3
5	22	(Italy) Luigi Villoresi	Maserati	34	+2 Laps	11	2
6	20	(Belgium) André Pilette	Ferrari	33	+3 Laps	15	
7	32	(France) Jean Behra	Maserati	33	+3 Laps	4	
8	24	(France) Louis Rosier	Maserati	33	+3 Laps	10	
Ret	2	(Argentina) Juan Manuel Fangio	Ferrari	23	Transmission	1	
Ret	12	(France) Maurice Trintignant	Vanwall	11	Fuel system	7	
Ret	30	(United Kingdom) Stirling Moss	Maserati	10	Wheel	2	
Ret	4	(Italy) Eugenio Castellotti	Ferrari	10	Transmission	5	
Ret	28	(Italy) Piero Scotti	Connaught-Alta	10	Engine	12	
Ret	26	(United Kingdom) Horace Gould	Maserati	2	Gearbox	14	
Ret	36	(Spain) Paco Godia	Maserati	0	Accident	13	
DNS	38	(United Kingdom) Mike Hawthorn	Maserati	0			

Notes

- ^1 – Includes 1 point for fastest lap

== Shared drive ==
- Car #34: Perdisa (13 laps) and Moss (23 laps).

== Notes ==
- For the first time in 21 races, Fangio ended the race pointless. Since the 1953 Belgian Grand Prix, Fangio had ended his Formula One World Championship races with at least one point.

== Championship standings after the race ==
Drivers' Championship standings

	Pos	Driver	Points
8	1	(United Kingdom) Peter Collins	11
1	2	(United Kingdom) Stirling Moss	11
2	3	(France) Jean Behra	10
2	4	(Argentina) Juan Manuel Fangio	9
1	5	(United States) Pat Flaherty	8

- Note: Only the top five positions are included.

Previous race: 1956 Indianapolis 500	FIA Formula One World Championship; 1956 season	Next race: 1956 French Grand Prix
Previous race: 1955 Belgian Grand Prix	Belgian Grand Prix	Next race: 1958 Belgian Grand Prix
