= 1956 French Grand Prix =

← Previous race	Next race →
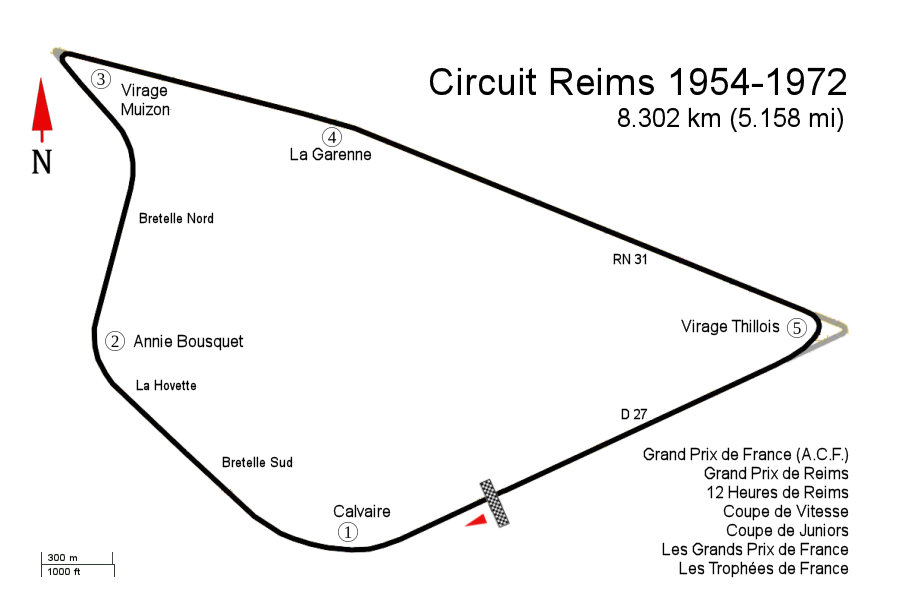
- Reims-Gueux layout

Race details
- Date: 1 July 1956
- Official name: XLII Grand Prix de l'ACF
- Location: Reims Circuit, Reims, France
- Course: Temporary road course
- Course length: 8.302 km (5.159 miles)
- Distance: 61 laps, 506.422 km (314.676 miles)

Pole position
Driver	(Argentina) Juan Manuel Fangio	Ferrari
- Time: 2:23.3

Fastest lap
Driver	(Argentina) Juan Manuel Fangio	Ferrari
- Time: 2:25.8

Podium
First	(United Kingdom) Peter Collins	Ferrari
Second	(Italy) Eugenio Castellotti	Ferrari
Third	(France) Jean Behra	Maserati

The 1956 French Grand Prix was a Formula One motor race held on 1 July 1956 at Reims. It was race 5 of 8 in the 1956 World Championship of Drivers.

Bugatti made a one-off appearance in this race with their Type 251, a Rear mid-engine, rear-wheel-drive layout driven by Maurice Trintignant. The car proved to be uncompetitive and he retired after 18 laps.

This race was also notable for being the only Formula One World Championship entry as a driver for Team Lotus founder Colin Chapman.

== Classification ==
=== Qualifying ===
Pos	No	Driver	Constructor	Time	Gap
1	10	(Argentina) Juan Manuel Fangio	Ferrari	2:23.3	—
2	12	(Italy) Eugenio Castellotti	Ferrari	2:24.6	+1.3
3	14	(United Kingdom) Peter Collins	Ferrari	2:25.6	+2.3
4	22	(United States) Harry Schell	Vanwall	2:26.1	+2.8
5	26	(United Kingdom) Colin Chapman	Vanwall	2:26.8	+3.5
6	24	(United Kingdom) Mike Hawthorn	Vanwall	2:27.0	+3.7
7	4	(France) Jean Behra	Maserati	2:27.8	+4.5
8	2	(United Kingdom) Stirling Moss	Maserati	2:29.9	+6.6
9	16	(Spain) Alfonso de Portago	Ferrari	2:30.9	+7.6
10	38	(Italy) Luigi Villoresi	Maserati	2:33.3	+10.0
11	44	(Belgium) Olivier Gendebien	Ferrari	2:34.5	+11.2
12	36	(France) Louis Rosier	Maserati	2:35.3	+12.0
13	8	(Italy) Piero Taruffi	Maserati	2:35.6	+12.3
14	32	(Brazil) Hermano da Silva Ramos	Gordini	2:35.9	+12.6
15	30	(France) Robert Manzon	Gordini	2:36.0	+12.7
16	6	(Italy) Cesare Perdisa	Maserati	2:36.4	+13.1
17	40	(Spain) Paco Godia	Maserati	2:40.0	+16.7
18	28	(France) Maurice Trintignant	Bugatti	2:41.9	+18.6
19	34	(Belgium) André Pilette	Gordini	2:46.8	+23.5
20	42	(France) André Simon	Maserati	2:47.9	+24.6

=== Race ===
Pos	No	Driver	Constructor	Laps	Time/Retired	Grid	Points
1	14	(United Kingdom) Peter Collins	Ferrari	61	2:34:23.4	3	8
2	12	(Italy) Eugenio Castellotti	Ferrari	61	+0.3	2	6
3	4	(France) Jean Behra	Maserati	61	+1:29.9	7	4
4	10	(Argentina) Juan Manuel Fangio	Ferrari	61	+1:35.1	1	4^{1}
5	6	(Italy) Cesare Perdisa (United Kingdom) Stirling Moss	Maserati	59	+2 Laps	13	1; 1
6	36	(France) Louis Rosier	Maserati	58	+3 Laps	12	
7	40	(Spain) Paco Godia	Maserati	57	+4 Laps	17	
8	32	(Brazil) Hermano da Silva Ramos	Gordini	57	+4 Laps	14	
9	30	(France) Robert Manzon	Gordini	56	+5 Laps	15	
10	24	(United Kingdom) Mike Hawthorn (United States) Harry Schell	Vanwall	56	+5 Laps	6	
11	34	(Belgium) André Pilette	Gordini	55	+6 Laps	19	
Ret	42	(France) André Simon	Maserati	41	Engine	20	
Ret	8	(Italy) Piero Taruffi	Maserati	40	Engine	16	
Ret	44	(Belgium) Olivier Gendebien	Ferrari	38	Clutch	11	
Ret	38	(Italy) Luigi Villoresi	Maserati	23	Brakes	10	
Ret	16	(Spain) Alfonso de Portago	Ferrari	20	Gearbox	9	
Ret	28	(France) Maurice Trintignant	Bugatti	18	Throttle	18	
Ret	2	(United Kingdom) Stirling Moss	Maserati	12	Gearbox	8	
Ret	22	(United States) Harry Schell	Vanwall	5	Engine	4	
DNS	26	(United Kingdom) Colin Chapman	Vanwall		Accident/driver injured	5	

Notes

- ^1 – Includes 1 point for fastest lap

== Shared drives ==
- Car #6: Cesare Perdisa (20 laps) and Stirling Moss (39 laps). They shared the 2 points for fifth place.
- Car #24: Mike Hawthorn (10 laps) and Harry Schell (46 laps).

== Championship standings after the race ==
Drivers' Championship standings

	Pos	Driver	Points
	1	(United Kingdom) Peter Collins	19
1	2	(France) Jean Behra	14
1	3	(Argentina) Juan Manuel Fangio	13
2	4	(United Kingdom) Stirling Moss	12
	5	(United States) Pat Flaherty	8

- Note: Only the top five positions are included.

Previous race: 1956 Belgian Grand Prix	FIA Formula One World Championship; 1956 season	Next race: 1956 British Grand Prix
Previous race: 1954 French Grand Prix	French Grand Prix	Next race: 1957 French Grand Prix
