= Gotfrid Köchert =

Austrian sailor

Personal information
- Nationality: Austrian
- Born: 22 March 1918; Vienna, Austria-Hungary
- Died: 6 November 1986 (aged 68)

Sport
- Sport: Sailing

Gotfrid (or Gottfried) Köchert (22 March 1918 – 6 November 1986), a scion of the Viennese jeweller A. E. Köchert, went on to become a yacht racer after World War II, and competed in the 1960 Summer Olympics.

== Family ==
He was the biological father of Austrian-American actress Bibi Besch and grandfather of actress Samantha Mathis.
