= Lotus Eleven =

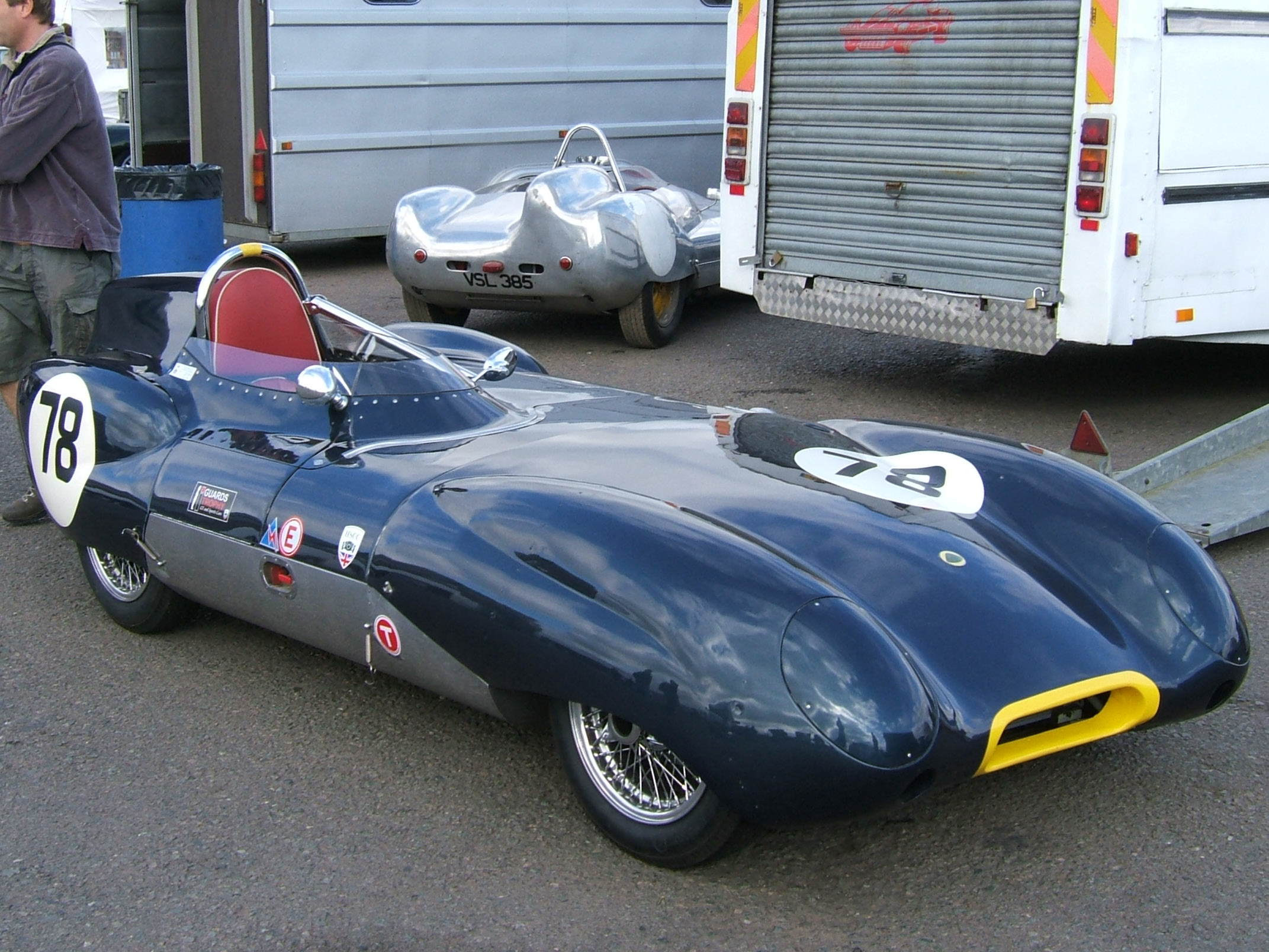
- A Lotus Eleven at Donington Park in 2007

Overview
- Manufacturer: Lotus Cars
- Production: 1956–1958
- Designer: Frank Costin

Body and chassis
- Class: Sports car
- Layout: Front-engine, rear-wheel-drive

Powertrain
- Engine: Coventry-Climax FWA (1098 cc) SOHC I4; Ford (1172 cc) I4
- Transmission: BMC A30, 4-speed manual

Dimensions
- Wheelbase: 2,159 mm (85.0 in)
- Length: 3,403 mm (134.0 in)
- Width: 1,500 mm (59 in)
- Height: 810 mm (32 in)
- Kerb weight: from 412 kg (908 lb)

Chronology
- Predecessor: Lotus Mark IX

The Lotus Eleven is a sports racing car built in various versions by Lotus from 1956 until 1958. The later versions built in 1958 are sometimes referred to as Lotus 13, although this was not an official designation. In total, about 270 Elevens of all versions were built.

== Design and performance ==
The Eleven was designed by Colin Chapman and fitted with a sleek body designed by aerodynamicist Frank Costin. Its top version, dubbed Le Mans, was fitted with a 1100 cc (67ci) Coventry Climax FWA engine; occasionally with a 1500 cc (92ci) Coventry Climax FWB engine), mounted in the front of a tubular space frame. The Eleven featured a De Dion tube rear axle and Girling disc brakes.

Fully loaded, the car weighed only about 1,000 lb (450 kg). Versions for a 1100 cc (67ci) Climax engine (Club) and a 1172 cc (72ci) Ford engine (Sport) were also produced; both featured a live rear axle and drum brakes. Several cars were fitted with alternative engines by their owners, these included Coventry Climax 1500cc (92ci) FWB and FPF and 1200 cc (73ci) FWE, Maserati 150S 1500cc (92ci), DKW 1000cc (61ci) SAAB 850cc (52ci) and 750cc (46ci) engines. There were two main body styles: one with a headrest and the other with no headrest, just two small fins. Some cars were later fitted with a closed body with gullwing doors to meet GT specifications.

Perhaps the car's most notable race result was 7th overall at the 1956 24 Hours of Le Mans, driven by Reg Bicknell and Peter Jopp.

Lotus Elevens and lorry for 1956 Le Mans 24 hours

Despite the wide variety of engines installed, the car was primarily designed to compete in the 1100 cc class where it was one of the most successful cars during the mid- to late-1950s. In 1956, an Eleven, modified by Costin with a bubble canopy over the cockpit, was driven by Stirling Moss to a class world record of 143 mph (230 km/h) for a lap at Monza. Several class victories at Le Mans and Sebring followed, and the Eleven became Lotus' most successful race car design. A 750cc version won the Index of Performance at Le Mans in 1957.

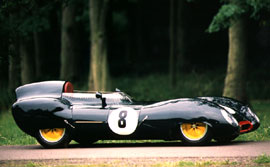
Lotus Eleven at Donington Park

In 1957, the Eleven underwent a major design change, including a new front suspension and improvements to the drivetrain. Although officially called Eleven Series 2, these late models are sometimes informally referred to as Lotus 13s, since they were produced between the 12 and 14 models and the 13 designation was not used by Lotus.

There have been several replicas and re-creations of the Lotus Eleven, including the Kokopelli 11, the Challenger GTS, the Spartak and the best known, the Westfield XI.
