= Mike Hawthorn =

British racing driver (1929–1959)

- Hawthorn at the 1955 24 Hours of Le Mans
- Born: John Michael Hawthorn; 10 April 1929; Mexborough, West Riding of Yorkshire, England
- Died: 22 January 1959 (aged 29); Near Guildford, Surrey, England
- Cause of death: Single vehicle road collision
- Children: 1

Formula One World Championship career
- Nationality: (United Kingdom) British
- Active years: 1952–1958
- Team(s): Privateer Cooper, Ferrari, Vanwall, BRM, Maserati
- Entries: 47 (45 starts)
- Championships: 1 (1958)
- Wins: 3
- Podiums: 18
- Career points: 112 9/14 (127 9/14) (Note: Up until 1990, not all points scored by a driver contributed to their final World Championship tally (see list of points scoring systems for more information). Numbers without parentheses are Championship points; numbers in parentheses are total points scored.)
- Pole positions: 4
- Fastest laps: 6
- First entry: 1952 Belgian Grand Prix
- First win: 1953 French Grand Prix
- Last win: 1958 French Grand Prix
- Last entry: 1958 Moroccan Grand Prix

24 Hours of Le Mans career
- Years: 1953, 1955–1958
- Teams: Ferrari, Jaguar
- Best finish: 1st (1955)
- Class wins: 1 (1955)

John Michael Hawthorn (10 April 1929 – 22 January 1959) was a British racing driver who competed in Formula One from 1952 to 1958. Hawthorn won the Formula One World Drivers' Championship in 1958 with Ferrari, and won three Grands Prix across seven seasons. In endurance racing, Hawthorn won both the 24 Hours of Le Mans and the 12 Hours of Sebring in 1955 with Jaguar.

In 1958, Hawthorn became the first of 11 British Formula One World Champions, beating Stirling Moss to the title by one point. He announced his retirement upon his triumph, having been profoundly affected by the death of his teammate and friend Peter Collins two months earlier during the German Grand Prix. Three months after retiring, Hawthorn died in a road accident in Guildford, driving his Jaguar 3.4 Litre. The Hawthorn Memorial Trophy was established in his honour by the RAC in 1959, being awarded to the most successful British, or Commonwealth, driver in Formula One each year.

== Early life ==
Hawthorn was born in the town of Mexborough, West Riding of Yorkshire, England, to Leslie and Winifred (née Symonds) Hawthorn, and educated at Ardingly College, West Sussex, followed by studies at Chelsea technical college and an apprenticeship with a commercial vehicle manufacturer. His father owned the Tourist Trophy Garage in Farnham, franchised to supply and service several high performance brands, including Jaguar and Ferrari. His father raced motorcycles and supported his son's racing career; when he died in a road accident in 1954, Mike Hawthorn inherited the business.

== Racing career ==
Hawthorn made his competition debut on 2 September 1950 in his 1934 Riley Ulster Imp, KV 9475, winning the 1,100 cc sports car class at the Brighton Speed Trials. In 1951, driving a 1 1/2-litre T.T. Riley, he entered the Motor Sport Brooklands Memorial Trophy, a season-long contest run at Goodwood, winning it by one point. He also won the Ulster Trophy Handicap at Dundrod and the Leinster Trophy at Wicklow that year.

=== 1952 ===
By 1952, Hawthorn had switched to single-seaters and during that season won his first race in a Formula Two Cooper-Bristol T20 at Goodwood. Further successes followed which brought him to the attention of Enzo Ferrari, who offered him a works drive. He made his Formula One debut at the 1952 Grote Prijs van Belgie on the legendary Circuit de Spa-Francorchamps, finishing in fourth place. By the end of the season, he had already secured his first podium, with a third place at the RAC British Grand Prix and a brace of fourths driving a Cooper.

=== 1953 ===
At Scuderia Ferrari for the 1953 season, Hawthorn immediately showed his worth with victory, at his ninth attempt, in the French Grand Prix at Reims, outmanoeuvring Juan Manuel Fangio in what became dubbed 'the race of the century' with the top four drivers finishing within five seconds of each other after 60 laps. This and two other podium finishes helped him end the season fourth overall. He also won the BRDC International Trophy and the Ulster Trophy as well as the 24 Heures de Spa Francorchamps with Ferrari teammate Giuseppe Farina.

=== 1954 ===
Hawthorn's liability for conscription (National Service) was brought up in the House of Commons. In a crash during the Gran Premio di Siracusa Hawthorn suffered serious burns, but finished the year with three seconds and then victory in the season finale in Spain, placing him third in the Drivers' Championship. Following the death of his father, Hawthorn left Ferrari to race for Tony Vandervell's Vanwall team, as he needed to spend more time at the family garage he had inherited, but after two races returned to Ferrari.

=== 1955 ===
==== 24 Hours of Le Mans ====
The 1955 Le Mans accident

In January 1955, Hawthorn joined the Jaguar racing team, replacing Stirling Moss, who had left for Mercedes. Hawthorn won the 1955 les 24 Heures du Mans following what has been described as an inspired drive in which he set a lap record of 4 minutes and 6.6 seconds during a three-hour duel with Fangio in the early stages. However, the race was marred by the worst disaster in motor racing history, a crash which killed 83 spectators and Mercedes driver Pierre Levegh. After overtaking Lance Macklin's Healey, Hawthorn suddenly braked in front of him on noticing an order to enter the pits to refuel, causing Macklin to swerve into the path of Levegh's Mercedes. After colliding with the Healey, the Mercedes skipped the earthen embankment separating the spectator area from the track, bounced through spectator enclosures, then hit a concrete stairwell parapet head-on. The impact shattered the front end of the car, which then somersaulted high, pitching debris into the spectator area, before landing atop the earthen embankment. The debris, including bonnet, engine, and front axle, which separated from the frame, flew through the crowd.

Eight hours later, while leading the race 1.5 laps ahead of the Jaguar team, the Mercedes team withdrew from the race, ostensibly as a mark of respect for those who had perished in the accident; the Jaguar team was invited to join them but declined. The French press carried photographs of Hawthorn and Ivor Bueb celebrating their win with the customary champagne but treated them with scorn.

The official inquiry into the accident ruled that Hawthorn was not responsible for the crash, and that it was merely a racing incident. The death of so many spectators was blamed on inadequate safety standards for track design. Aside from two layout changes to make the circuit shorter, the track was largely unaltered since the inception of the race in 1923, when top speeds of cars were typically in the region of 100 km/h (60 mph). By 1955, top speeds for the leading cars were over 270 km/h (170 mph). That said, the circuit had been resurfaced and widened post-war. The pits and grandstands had been reconstructed, but there were no barriers between the pit lane and the racing line, and only a 4 ft (1.2 m) earthen bank between the track and the spectators. The Grandstand and pit areas were demolished and rebuilt soon after. The death toll led to a ban on motorsports in France, Spain, Switzerland, Germany and other nations, until the tracks could be brought to a higher safety standard. In Switzerland, motorsports were banned with exceptions until the ban was lifted in June 2022.

==== Dundrod ====
Whilst sharing the Jaguar D-Type with Desmond Titterington during the 1955 RAC Tourist Trophy at Dundrod, Hawthorn passed Fangio twice, and set the lap record for the RAC Tourist Trophy on the Dundrod Circuit, only to lose in the final stages when, running on full tanks, he was passed by Stirling Moss when the D Type's engine failed on the last lap.

=== 1956–1957 ===
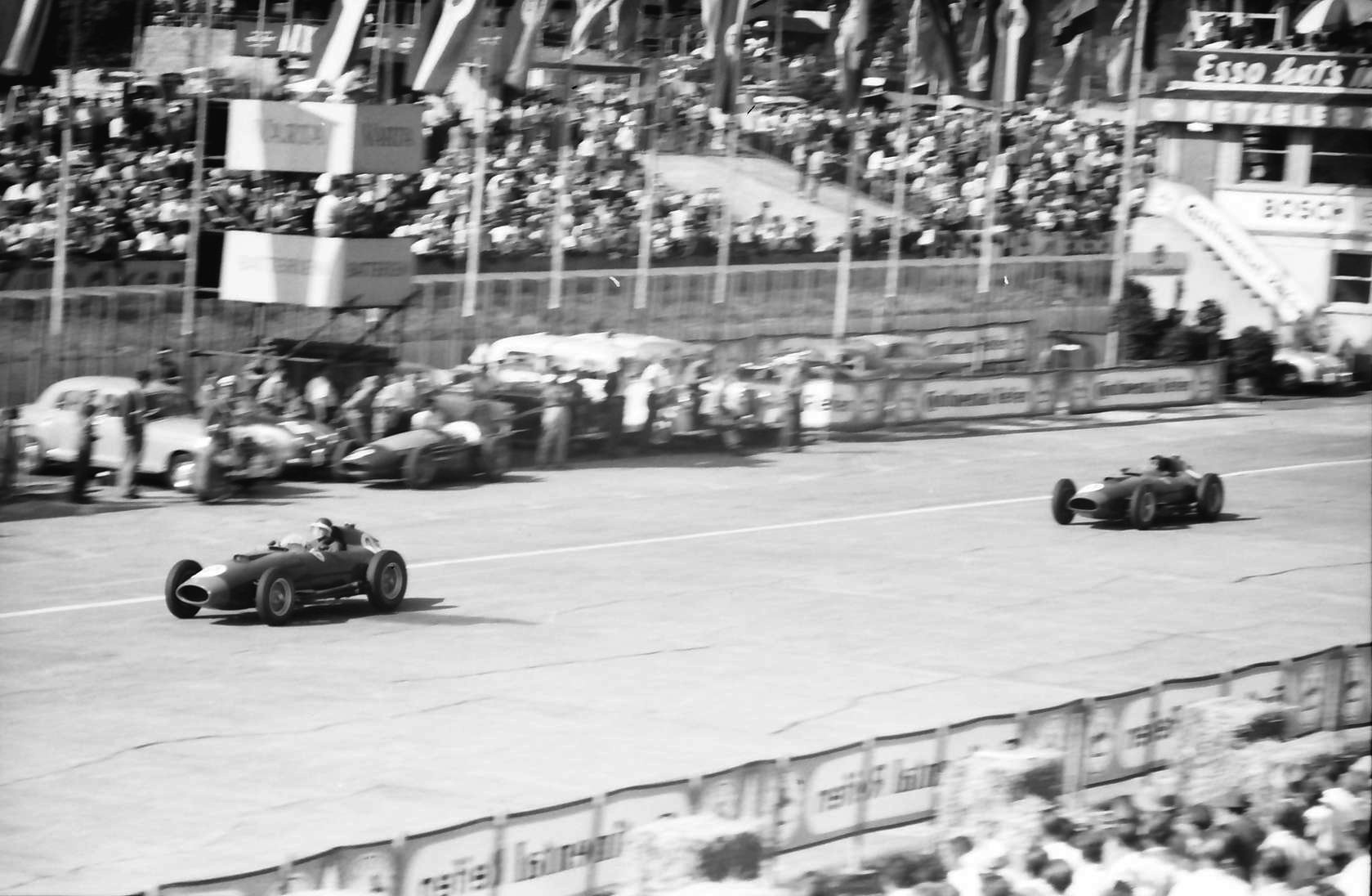
Hawthorn leads Peter Collins in their Ferrari 801 cars, during the 1957 German Grand Prix

Another change of team for 1956—this time to BRM—was a failure, and Hawthorn's only podium came in Argentina where the non-appearance of his BRM allowed him to guest drive a Maserati 250F. However, when it appeared, usually only in British races, the new 2.5 BRM was very fast while it lasted, and Hawthorn held off Fangio, leading the first 25 laps at Silverstone in the British GP. He retired the car before half distance owing to deteriorating handling and brakes.

Deeply unhappy with the BRM team's management and car preparation, Hawthorn walked out of the team at this point. Hawthorn had left Ferrari because driving for the British Jaguar sports car team was his first priority. He was favoured to win at Le Mans again, but lost ten laps in the pits early in the race, and while the D type repeatedly set fastest laps, the fuel consumption rules meant he could only finish sixth.

Racing the D type in Italy, Hawthorn crashed and suffered very serious burns, his second bad accident of the year, leaving him disillusioned with racing. However, he believed a return to Ferrari could give him the championship in the superior Lancia Ferrari D50. He had put the original Jano version of the car on the front row at its debut in the final F1 race of 1955 at Oulton Park. However, Ferrari's modified version of the design for 1957 was slower than Fangio and Collins's all-conquering 1956 Lancia Ferrari. The 1957 version, with the polar centred pannier tanks removed, still handled well, but was not the masterpiece Jano designed; it lacked straight line speed and was not competitive by mid 1957, clearly inferior to the new Vanwalls.

Hawthorn rejoined the Ferrari factory team in 1957, and soon became friends with Peter Collins, a fellow Englishman and Ferrari team driver. During the 1957 and 1958 racing seasons, the two Englishmen became engaged in a fierce rivalry with Luigi Musso, another Ferrari driver, for prize money.

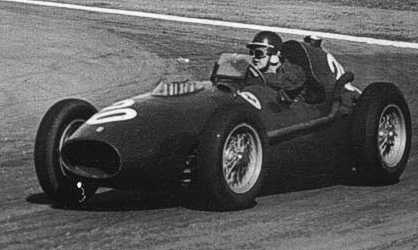
Hawthorn driving his Ferrari to third in the Gran Premio de la Republica Argentina

=== 1958 World Champion ===
Hawthorn won the 1958 Formula One Championship despite achieving only one win, against four by Moss. Hawthorn won the 1958 French Grand Prix at Reims, in which Musso was fatally injured while in second place. Leading easily in the 1958 Monaco Grand Prix at half distance, his 246 engine blew, while at Monza he was a minute ahead of Tony Brooks when his clutch forced him to slow to second place.

Hawthorn benefited greatly from the gentlemanliness of Moss, as demonstrated at the 1958 Portuguese Grand Prix at Porto. Hawthorn was disqualified for bump starting his stalled car downhill in the opposite direction, on the way to a second-place finish. Moss interceded on Hawthorn's behalf and the decision was ultimately reversed. After a pit stop midway through that race, Hawthorn accelerated back through the field to gain an extra point for fastest lap. Moss had failed to respond, possibly doubting Hawthorn could lap so fast with damaged drum brakes. This extra world championship point plus the second place points contributed to Hawthorn winning the championship with a season total just one more than that of Moss.

In the final race, the 1958 Moroccan Grand Prix, Hawthorn drove a conservative tactical race aiming to stay ahead of Moss's Vanwall teammates. Brooks's car broke while narrowly leading Hawthorn, and Stuart Lewis-Evans in the third Vanwall crashed after a desperate attempt to move through the field and challenge Hawthorn running third; Evans later died of burns. In the last laps, second-placed Phil Hill slowed and waved Hawthorn through to gain enough points to take the Championship; the first ever to be won by an English driver. Hawthorn's total of just one win in his title winning season means that Hawthorn currently jointly holds the Formula One record for the fewest number of Grand Prix wins by an eventual drivers' champion during a title winning season along with Keke Rosberg (who also scored one win in his subsequent 1982 title winning season)

After winning the title, Hawthorn immediately announced his retirement from Formula One. He began a series of books for children featuring not only the wholly fictional Carlotti, but also himself and other drivers of the day ('Stirling nipped past me at the hairpin', and so on). The first, published in 1958, was Carlotti Joins the Team, and a second was published in 1959 called Carlotti Takes the Wheel. Due to his death, the series did not continue.

Hawthorn was noted for wearing a bow tie when racing; to the French, he became known as 'Le Papillon' (The Butterfly).

== Rivalry with Luigi Musso ==
Fiamma Breschi, Musso's girlfriend at the time of his death, revealed the nature of Musso's rivalry with Hawthorn and Collins in a television documentary, The Secret Life of Enzo Ferrari, many years after the death of Hawthorn. Breschi recalled that the antagonism between Musso and the two English drivers encouraged all three to take more risks: "The Englishmen (Hawthorn and Collins) had an agreement", she says. "Whichever of them won, they would share the winnings equally. It was the two of them against Luigi, who was not part of the agreement. Strength comes in numbers, and they were united against him. This antagonism was actually favourable rather than damaging to Ferrari. The faster the drivers went, the more likely it was that a Ferrari would win." Breschi related that Musso was in debt at the time of his death, and the money for winning the 1958 French Grand Prix (traditionally the largest monetary prize of the season), was all-important to him.

After visiting the mortally injured Musso in hospital, Breschi returned to her hotel, where she and the rest of the Ferrari team were informed by the team manager that Musso had died. Within thirty days Collins too was dead, and the following January, Hawthorn. Breschi could not suppress a feeling of release: "I had hated them both", she said, "first because I was aware of certain facts that were not right, and also because when I came out of the hospital and went back to the hotel, I found them in the square outside the hotel, laughing and playing a game of football with an empty beer can. So when they died, too, it was liberating for me. Otherwise I would have had unpleasant feelings towards them forever. This way I could find a sense of peace."

== Personal life ==
After leaving school in the summer of 1946, Hawthorn started serving his apprenticeship with Dennis Bros of Guildford in Surrey. He used his 1939 250cc OHV Triumph to get there each day regularly racing Jack Kinghorn on his Triumph Thunderbird on the infamous A31 Hog's Back between Farnham where his father's garage was located and the Guildford A3 factory where they both worked. Hawthorn never married, but fathered a son, Arnaud Michael Delaunay born 1954, with Jacqueline Delaunay, whom he met in Reims after winning the French Grand Prix in 1953. He was engaged at the time of his death to the fashion model Jean Howarth, who later married another racing driver, Innes Ireland, in 1993.

== Death ==
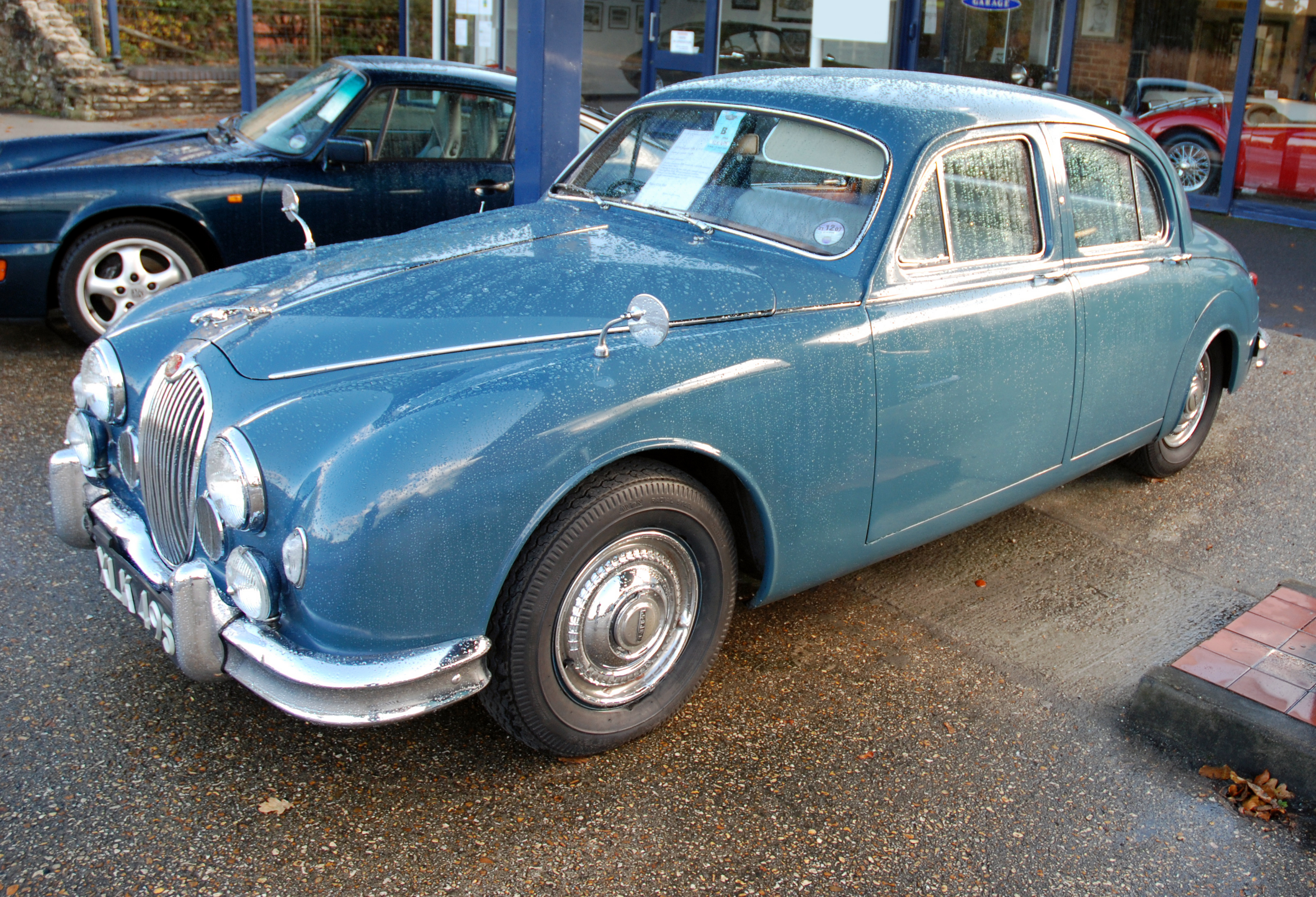
A 1959 Jaguar 3.4 Mk.1

On 22 January 1959, only three months after his retirement, Hawthorn died in a car accident on the A3 Guildford bypass near Onslow Village, while driving his comprehensively modified 1958 Jaguar 3.4-litre saloon (now known as the 3.4 Mk 1) VDU 881 to London. While the circumstances of the accident are well documented, the precise cause remains unknown.

The accident occurred on a notoriously dangerous section of the road, the scene of 15 serious accidents (two fatal) in the previous two years; the road was also wet at the time. Driving at speed (one witness estimated 80 m.p.h.), Hawthorn overtook a Mercedes-Benz 300SL 'gull-wing' sports car driven by an acquaintance, the motor racing team manager Rob Walker. On entering a right-hand bend shortly after passing the Mercedes, Hawthorn clipped a 'Keep Left' bollard dividing the two carriageways, causing him to lose control. The Jaguar glanced an oncoming Bedford lorry before careering back across the eastbound carriageway sideways into a roadside tree, uprooting it. The impact caused Hawthorn fatal head injuries and propelled him onto the rear seat.

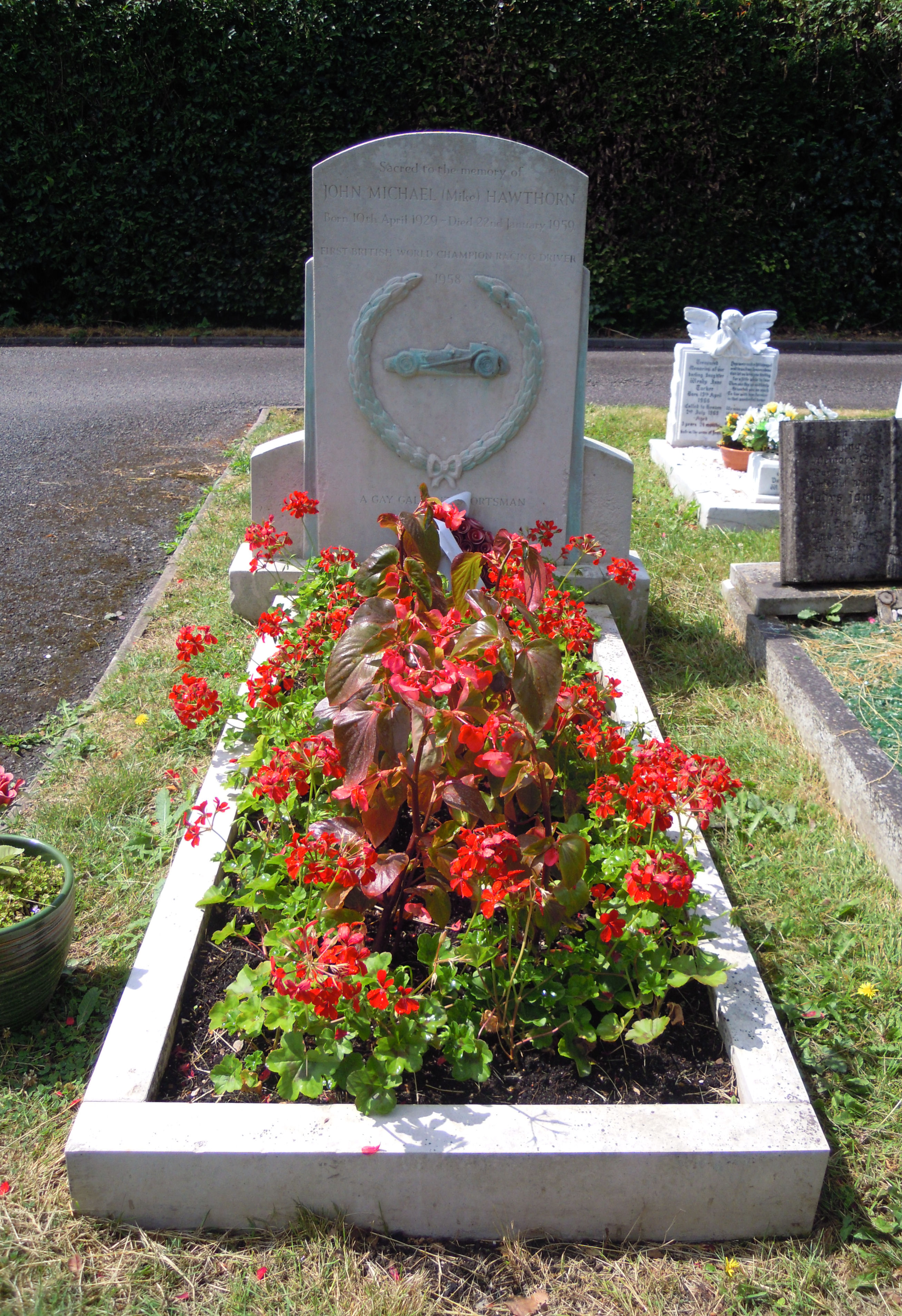
Hawthorn's grave in West Street Cemetery in Farnham

There was inevitable speculation that Hawthorn and Walker had been racing each other, fuelled by Walker's persistent refusal at the coroner's inquest to estimate the speed of his own car at the time. In an interview with motor racing journalist Eoin Young and writer Eric Dymock in 1988, Walker admitted he had indeed been racing Hawthorn, but had been advised by a police officer investigating the accident to make no further mention of it lest he incriminate himself.

Possible causes of the accident include driver error, a blackout, or mechanical failure, although examination of the wreck revealed no obvious fault. There is evidence that Hawthorn had recently suffered blackouts, perhaps because of kidney failure. By 1955, Hawthorn had already lost one kidney to infection, and had begun suffering problems with the other; he was expected at the time to live only three more years.

At the coroner's inquest on 26 January, the jury returned a verdict of accidental death. Hawthorn was buried in West Street Cemetery in Farnham.

== Eponymy ==
In Farnham, the town where he lived up to the time of his death, there is a street named Mike Hawthorn Drive. It was in this town that Hawthorn ran the Tourist Trophy Garage which sold Jaguars, Rileys, Fiats and Ferraris. The garage still exists and is now named after him. There is a hill and corner named after him at Brands Hatch and a corner at the Croft racing circuit at Croft-on-Tees in North Yorkshire, while in Towcester on the Shires estate, three miles from the Silverstone circuit, Hawthorn Drive is named after him. There is a statue at Goodwood Circuit commemorating Hawthorn as the UK's first Formula One World Champion.

=== Hawthorn Memorial Trophy ===
The Hawthorn Memorial Trophy has been awarded to the most successful British or Commonwealth Formula 1 driver every year since 1959. Lewis Hamilton has won the award the most times, taking the trophy on eleven occasions.

== Racing record ==
=== Career highlights ===
Season	Series	Position	Team	Car
1951	Motor Sport Brooklands Memorial Trophy	**1st**		Riley TT Sprite
1951	Leinster Trophy	**1st**		Riley TT Sprite
1952	Lavant Cup	**1st**	R.J. Chase	Cooper-Bristol T20
1952	Chichester Cup	**1st**		Cooper-Bristol T20
1952	Ibsley Grand Prix	**1st**	R.J. Chase	Cooper-Bristol T20
1952	Sussex Trophy	**1st**		Cooper-Bristol T20
1952	Scottish National Trophy	**1st**	Leslie D. Hawthorn	Connaught-Lea Francis A
1952	Richmond Trophy	2nd	Ecurie Richmond	Cooper-Bristol T20
1952	Ulster Trophy	2nd	Archie Bryde	Cooper-Bristol T20
1952	British Empire Trophy	3rd	Len Potter	Frazer Nash Mille Miglia
1952	RAC British Grand Prix	3rd	Leslie D. Hawthorn	Cooper-Bristol T20
1952	Daily Mail Trophy	3rd	Leslie D. Hawthorn	Cooper-Bristol T20
1952	FIA Formula One World Championship	5th	Leslie D. Hawthorn; Archie Bryde	Cooper-Bristol T20
1953	Daily Express B.R.D.C. International Trophy	**1st**	Scuderia Ferrari	Ferrari 500
1953	Silverstone International	**1st**	Scuderia Ferrari	Ferrari 340 MM Barchetta Touring
1953	Ulster Trophy	**1st**	Scuderia Ferrari	Ferrari 500
1953	Grand Prix de l'A.C.F.	**1st**	Scuderia Ferrari	Ferrari 500
1953	24 Heures de Spa Francorchamps	**1st**	Scuderia Ferrari	Ferrari 375 MM Pinin Farina Berlinetta
1953	12 Hours of Pescara	**1st**	Scuderia Ferrari	Ferrari 375 MM Berlinetta
1953	Goodwood Trophy	**1st**	G.A. Vandervell	Ferrari Thinwall
1953	Woodcote Cup	**1st**	G.A. Vandervell	Ferrari Thinwall
1953	Grand Prix Automobile de Pau	2nd	Scuderia Ferrari	Ferrari 500
1953	Grand Prix de Rouen-les-Essarts	2nd	Scuderia Ferrari	Ferrari 625
1953	Gran Premio Ciudad de Buenos Aires	3rd	Scuderia Ferrari	Ferrari 500
1953	Großer Preis von Deutschland	3rd	Scuderia Ferrari	Ferrari 500
1953	Großer Preis der Schweiz	3rd	Scuderia Ferrari	Ferrari 500
1953	FIA Formula One World Championship	4th	Scuderia Ferrari	Ferrari 500
1954	Gran Premio Supercortemaggiore	**1st**	Scuderia Ferrari	Ferrari 735 S
1954	RAC Tourist Trophy	**1st**	Scuderia Ferrari	Ferrari 750 Monza
1954	Gran Premio de España	**1st**	Scuderia Ferrari	Ferrari 625
1954	RAC British Grand Prix	2nd	Scuderia Ferrari	Ferrari 625
1954	Circuito de Monsanto	2nd	Scuderia Ferrari	Ferrari 750 Monza
1954	Großer Preis von Deutschland	2nd	Scuderia Ferrari	Ferrari 625
1954	Gran Premio d'Italia	2nd	Scuderia Ferrari	Ferrari 625
1954	FIA Formula One World Championship	3rd	Scuderia Ferrari	Ferrari 625
1955	Florida International Twelve Hour Grand Prix of Endurance	**1st**	B.S. Cunningham	Jaguar D-Type
1955	Les 24 Heures du Mans	**1st**	Jaguar Cars Ltd.	Jaguar D-Type
1955	London Trophy	**1st**	Stirling Moss Ltd.	Maserati 250F
1955	Gran Premio Supercortemaggiore	2nd	Scuderia Ferrari	Ferrari 750 Monza
1955	Daily Herald Trophy	2nd	Scuderia Ferrari	Ferrari 750 Monza
1955	International Gold Cup	2nd	Scuderia Ferrari	Lancia D50
1956	Daily Express International Trophy	**1st**	Jaguar Cars Ltd.	Jaguar Mark VII
1956	Gran Premio Supercortemaggiore	**1st**	Scuderia Ferrari	Ferrari 500 TR Touring
1956	Whit Monday Trophy	2nd		Lotus-Climax Eleven
1956	12 heures internationales Reims	2nd	Jaguar Cars Ltd.	Jaguar D-Type
1956	Gran Premio de la Republic Argentina	3rd	Owen Racing Organisation	Maserati 250F
1956	Sveriges Grand Prix	3rd	Scuderia Ferrari	Ferrari 860 Monza
1956	FIA Formula One World Championship	11th	Owen Racing Organisation; Vandervell Products	Maserati 250F; BRM P25; Vanwall VW2
1957	Daily Express International Trophy	**1st**	Jaguar Cars	Jaguar 3.4 Litre
1957	Gran Premio di Napoli	2nd	Scuderia Ferrari	Ferrari D50
1957	Großer Preis von Deutschland	2nd	Scuderia Ferrari	Ferrari 801
1957	Gran Premio de Venezuelav	2nd	Equipo Ferrari	Ferrari 335 S
1957	12-Hour Florida International Grand Prix of Endurance for The Amoco Trophy	3rd	Jaguar Cars North America	Jaguar D-Type
1957	Internationales ADAC 1000 Kilometer Rennen auf dem Nürburgring	3rd	Scuderia Ferrari	Ferrari 315 S
1957	RAC British Grand Prix	3rd	Scuderia Ferrari	Ferrari 801
1957	FIA Formula One World Championship	4th	Scuderia Ferrari	Ferrari 801
1958	**FIA Formula One World Championship**	**1st**	**Scuderia Ferrari**	**Ferrari 246**
1958	Glover Trophy	**1st**		Ferrari 246
1958	International Daily Express Trophy	**1st**		Jaguar 3.4 Litre
1958	Grand Prix de l'ACF	**1st**	Scuderia Ferrari	Ferrari 246
1958	Internationales ADAC 1000 Kilometer Rennen Nürburgring	2nd	Scuderia Ferrari	Ferrari 250 TR 58
1958	Grote Prijs van Belgie	2nd	Scuderia Ferrari	Ferrari 246
1958	RAC British Grand Prix	2nd	Scuderia Ferrari	Ferrari 246
1958	Grande Prémio de Portugal	2nd	Scuderia Ferrari	Ferrari 246
1958	Gran Premio d'Italia	2nd	Scuderia Ferrari	Ferrari 246
1958	Grand Prix du Maroc	2nd	Scuderia Ferrari	Ferrari 246
1958	Gran Premio de la Republica Argentina	3rd	Scuderia Ferrari	Ferrari 246
1958	Targa Florio	3rd	Scuderia Ferrari	Ferrari 250 TR 58
1958	500 Millas de Monza	3rd	Scuderia Ferrari	Ferrari 412 MI

=== Complete Formula One World Championship results ===
(key) (Races in bold indicate pole position; races in italics indicate fastest lap)

Year	Entrant	Chassis	Engine	1	2	3	4	5	6	7	8	9	10	11	WDC	Points
1952	Leslie D. Hawthorn	Cooper T20	Bristol BS1 2.0 L6	SUI	500	BEL; 4		GBR; 3	GER	NED; 4	ITA; NC				4th=	10
1952	AHM Bryde	Cooper T20	Bristol BS1 2.0 L6				FRA; Ret								4th=	10
1953	Scuderia Ferrari	Ferrari 500	Ferrari 500 2.0 L4	ARG; 4	500	NED; 4	BEL; 6	FRA; 1	GBR; 5	GER; 3	SUI; 3	ITA; 4			4th	19 (27)
1954	Scuderia Ferrari	Ferrari 625	Ferrari 625 2.5 L4	ARG; DSQ	500	BEL; 4*		GBR; 2	GER; 2*	SUI; Ret	ITA; 2				**3rd**	**24 9/14**
1954	Scuderia Ferrari	Ferrari 553	Ferrari 554 2.5 L4				FRA; Ret					ESP; 1			**3rd**	**24 9/14**
1955	Vandervell Products	Vanwall VW1	Vanwall 254 2.5 L4	ARG	MON; Ret	500	BEL; Ret								NC	0
1955	Scuderia Ferrari	Ferrari 555	Ferrari 555 2.5 L4					NED; 7		ITA; 10					NC	0
1955	Scuderia Ferrari	Ferrari 625	Ferrari 555 2.5 L4						GBR; 6*						NC	0
1956	Owen Racing Organisation	Maserati 250F	Maserati 250F1 2.5 L6	ARG; 3											12th	4
1956	Owen Racing Organisation	BRM P25	BRM P25 2.5 L4		MON; DNS	500			GBR; Ret	GER	ITA				12th	4
1956	Officine Alfieri Maserati	Maserati 250F	Maserati 250F1 2.5 L6				BEL; DNS								12th	4
1956	Vandervell Products	Vanwall VW2	Vanwall 254 2.5 L4					FRA; 10*							12th	4
1957	Scuderia Ferrari	Lancia-Ferrari D50A	Ferrari DS50 2.5 V8	ARG; Ret	MON; Ret	500									4th	13
1957	Scuderia Ferrari	Ferrari 801	Ferrari DS50 2.5 V8				FRA; 4	GBR; 3	GER; 2	PES	ITA; 6				4th	13
1958	Scuderia Ferrari	Ferrari 246	Ferrari 143 2.4 V6	ARG; 3	MON; Ret	NED; 5	500	**BEL**; 2	**FRA**; 1	GBR; 2	**GER**; Ret	POR; 2	ITA; 2	**MOR**; 2	**1st**	**42 (49)**

* Indicates Shared Drive

=== Formula One non-championship results ===
(key) (Races in bold indicate pole position) (Races in italics indicate fastest lap)

Year	Entrant	Chassis	Engine	1	2	3	4	5	6	7	8	9	10	11	12	13	14	15	16	17	18	19	20	21	22	23	24	25	26	27	28	29	30	31	32	33	34	35
1952	Ecurie Richmond	Cooper T20	Bristol BS1 2.0 L6	RIO	SYR	VAL	RIC; 2	**LAV**; 1	PAU	IBS; 1	MAR	AST																										
1952	Leslie D. Hawthorn	Cooper T20	Bristol BS1 2.0 L6										**INT**; Ret	ELÄ	NAP	EIF	PAR	ALB	FRO	ULS; 2	MNZ	LAC	ESS				DMT; 3	COM									NEW; DNS	RIO
1952	AHM Bryde	Cooper T20	Bristol BS1 2.0 L6																					MAR; 7	SAB	CAE												
1952	Leslie D. Hawthorn	Connaught A	Lea Francis 2.0 L4																										**NAT**; 1	BAU	MOD	CAD	SKA	MAD	AVU	JOE		
1953	Scuderia Ferrari	Ferrari 500	Ferrari 500 2.0 L4	SYR; Ret*	PAU; 2	LAV	AST	BOR	**INT**; 1	ELÄ	NAP	**ULS**; 1	WIN	FRO	COR	EIF	ALB	PRI	ESS	MID	**ROU**; 2	CRY	AVU	USF	LAC	BRI	CHE	SAB	NEW	CAD	RED	SKA	LON	MOD	MAD	JOE	CUR	
1954	Scuderia Ferrari	Ferrari 625	Ferrari 625 2.5 L4	SYR; Ret	PAU	LAV	BOR	INT	BAR	CUR	ROM	FRO	COR	BRC	CRY	ROU; DSQ	CAE	AUG	COR	OUL	RED	PES	JOE	CAD	BER	GOO												
1954	Vandervell Products	Vanwall Special	Vanwall 254 2.5 L4																								DTT; 2											
1955	Vandervell Products	Vanwall VW1	Vanwall 254 2.5 L4	NZL	BUE	VAL	PAU	GLO	BOR	INT; Ret	NAP	ALB	CUR	COR																								
1955	Stirling Moss Ltd	Maserati 250F	Maserati 250F1 2.5 L6												**LON**; 1	DRT	RED	DTT																				
1955	Scuderia Ferrari	Lancia D50	Lancia DS50 2.5 V8																OUL; 2	AVO	SYR																	
1956	Owen Racing Organisation	Maserati 250F	Maserati 250F1 2.5 L6	BUE; 9																																		
1956	Owen Racing Organisation	BRM P25	BRM P25 2.5 L4		GLV; Ret	SYR	AIN; Ret	INT; Ret	NAP	100	VNW	CAE	BRH																									
1957	Scuderia Ferrari	Lancia D50	Lancia DS50 2.5 V8	BUE; 4	SYR	PAU	GLV	**NAP**; 2	RMS; Ret	CAE	INT	MOD																										
1957	Scuderia Ferrari	Dino 156 F2	Ferrari D156 1.5 V6										MOR; Ret																									
1958	Scuderia Ferrari	Ferrari 246	Ferrari 143 2.4 V6	BUE	GLV; 1	SYR	AIN	INT	CAE																													

* Indicates shared drive with Alberto Ascari

=== Complete 24 Hours of Le Mans results ===
Year	Team	Co-Drivers	Car	Class	Laps	Pos.	Class Pos.
1953	(Italy) Scuderia Ferrari	(Italy) Giuseppe Farina	Ferrari 340 MM Pinin Farina Berlinetta	S5.0	12	DSQ	
1955	(United Kingdom) Jaguar Cars Ltd.	(United Kingdom) Ivor Bueb	Jaguar D-Type	S5.0	307	**1st**	**1st**
1956	(United Kingdom) Jaguar Cars Ltd.	(United Kingdom) Ivor Bueb	Jaguar D-Type	S5.0	280	6th	**3rd**
1957	(Italy) Scuderia Ferrari	(Italy) Luigi Musso	Ferrari 335 S	S5.0	56	DNF (Piston)	
1958	(Italy) Scuderia Ferrari	(United Kingdom) Peter Collins	Ferrari 250 TR 58	S3.0	112	DNF (Clutch)	

=== Complete 12 Hours of Sebring results ===
Year	Team	Co-Drivers	Car	Class	Laps	Pos.	Class Pos.
1955	(United States) B.S. Cunningham	(United States) Phil Walters	Jaguar D-Type	S5.0	182	**1st**	**1st**
1956	(United States) Jaguar of New York Distributors Inc.	(United Kingdom) Desmond Titterington	Jaguar D-Type	S5.0	162	DNF (Brakes)	
1957	(United States) Jaguar Cars of North America	(United Kingdom) Ivor Bueb	Jaguar D-Type	S5.0	193	**3rd**	**2nd**
1958	(Italy) Scuderia Ferrari	(West Germany) Wolfgang von Trips	Ferrari 250 TR 58	S3.0	159	DNF (Gearbox)	

=== Complete 24 Hours of Spa results ===
Year	Team	Co-Drivers	Car	Class	Laps	Pos.	Class Pos.
1953	(Italy) Scuderia Ferrari	(Italy) Giuseppe Farina	Ferrari 375 MM Pinin Farina Berlinetta	S	260	**1st**	**1st**

=== Complete Mille Miglia results ===
Year	Team	Co-Drivers	Car	Class	Pos.	Class Pos.
1953	(Italy) Ferrari Spa	(Italy) Azelio Cappi	Ferrari 250 MM Vignale Spyder	S+2.0	DNF (Brakes)	

=== Complete 12 Hours of Reims results ===
Year	Team	Co-Drivers	Car	Class	Pos.	Class Pos.
1956	(United Kingdom) Jaguar Cars	(Belgium) Paul Frère	Jaguar D-Type	S3.5	**2nd**	**2nd**

=== Complete 12 Hours of Pescara results ===
Year	Team	Co-Drivers	Car	Class	Pos.	Class Pos.
1953	(Italy) Scuderia Ferrari	(Italy) Umberto Maglioli	Ferrari 375 MM Pinin Farina Berlinetta	S+2.0	**1st**	**1st**

== Notes ==
Sporting positions
Preceded by Lance Macklin	BRDC International Trophy; Winner; 1953	Succeeded by José Froilán González
Preceded by Peter Collins; Pat Griffith	RAC Tourist Trophy; Winner; 1954; With: Maurice Trintignant	Succeeded by Stirling Moss; John Fitch
Preceded by José Froilán González; Maurice Trintignant	Winner of the 24 Hours of Le Mans; 1955; With: Ivor Bueb	Succeeded by Ron Flockhart; Ninian Sanderson
Preceded by Juan Manuel Fangio	Formula One World Champion; 1958	Succeeded by Jack Brabham
Records
Preceded by Alberto Ascari; 34 years, 16 days (1952 season)	Youngest Formula One; World Drivers' Champion; 29 years, 192 days (1958 season)	Succeeded by Jim Clark; 27 years, 188 days (1963 season)
