= 1956 12 Hours of Reims =

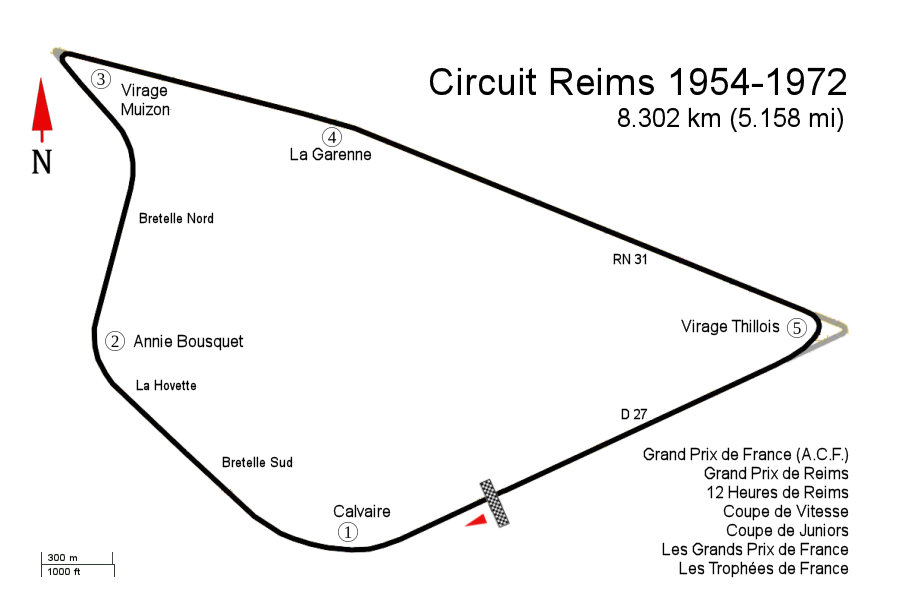
Reims-Gueux (1954–1972)

The 12 Hours of Reims were a sports car endurance racing series held from 1953 to 1967 at the circuit Reims-Gueux.

The race was notable for the death of Annie Bousquet, who broke her neck after her Porsche 550 flipped at the Virage de la Hovette. The corner was later renamed in her memory.

== Race report ==
- 42nd Grand Prix de l'ACF - 12 heures internationales Reims
- June 30, 1956, Circuit Reims (France), 8.302 km, non-championship race
- Classes: engines up to 750 cc (S750), 1500 cc (S1.5), 2000 cc (S2.0), 3500 cc (S3.5)
- Pole Position overall: (United Kingdom) #26 Jaguar D-type, (United Kingdom) Desmond Titterington / Jack Fairman, 2:35.30 - 192.45 km/h (119.58 mph)
- Fastest Lap overall: (United Kingdom) #25 Jaguar D-type, (United Kingdom) Duncan Hamilton, 2:37.20 - 190.12 km/h (118.14 mph)

=== Overall results ===
Pos	No	Drivers	Team	Constructor	Class	Laps	Distance	km/h - mph av.
1	25	(United Kingdom) Duncan Hamilton (United Kingdom) Ivor Bueb	(United Kingdom) Jaguar Cars Ltd.	(United Kingdom) Jaguar D-type	S3.5	267	2143.735 km	178.644 km/h (111.004 mph)
2	24	(United Kingdom) Mike Hawthorn (Belgium) Paul Frère	(United Kingdom) Jaguar Cars Ltd.	(United Kingdom) Jaguar D-type	S3.5	266	2135.395 km	177.949 km/h (110.572 mph)
3	26	(United Kingdom) Desmond Titterington (United Kingdom) Jack Fairman	(United Kingdom) Jaguar Cars Ltd.	(United Kingdom) Jaguar D-type	S3.5	265	2127.059 km	177.254 km/h (110.140 mph)
4	23	(United Kingdom) Ron Flockhart (United Kingdom) Ninian Sanderson	(Scotland) Ecurie Ecosse	(United Kingdom) Jaguar D-type	S3.5	265	2127.059 km	177.254 km/h (110.140 mph)
5	30	(Germany) Richard von Frankenberg (France) Claude Storez	(France) Auguste Veuillet	(Germany) Porsche 550 RS	S1.5	246	1974.870 km	164,572 km/h (102.260 mph)
6	6	(France) François Picard (France) Robert Manzon	(France) Cercle Los Amigos	(Italy) Ferrari 500 TR	S2.0	245	1971.044 km	164.253 km/h (102.062 mph)
7	12	(France) Élie Bayol (Brazil) Hermano da Silva Ramos	(Brazil) H. da Silva Ramos	(France) Gordini T15S 2.0	S2.0	244	1959.721 km	163.310 km/h (101.476 mph)
8	26	(Belgium) Christian Goethals (Belgium) P. Goethals	N/A	(Germany) Porsche 550	S1.5	229	1837.608 km	153.134 km/h (95.153 mph)
9	19	(France) Yves Giraud-Cabantous (France) Jean Ampoulié	N/A	(Italy) Ferrari 225 Sport	S3.5	215	1731.417 km	144.284 km/h (89.653 mph)
10	-	(France) Jacques Blaché (France) Louis Pons	(France) Pierre Ferry	(France) Ferry F750 Renault	S750	211	1690.302 km	140.658 km/h (87.400 mph)
11	-	(United Kingdom) Raymond Flower (United Kingdom) Colin Davis	N/A	(United Kingdom) Austin-Healey 100S	S3.5	210	1683.454 km	140.287 km/h (87.170 mph)
12	17	(France) Jean Guichet (France) Jean-Claude Vidilles	N/A	(Italy) Ferrari 500 Mondial	S2.0	209	1677.248 km	139.770 km/h (86.849 mph)
13	-	(Belgium) Georges Harris (Belgium) Georges Hacquin	N/A	(Germany) Porsche	S1.5	207	1665.028 km	138.752 km/h (86.216 mph)
14	-	(France) Roger Castelain (France) Pierre Ros	N/A	(Italy) Alfa Romeo Giulietta Veloce	S1.5	206	1659.514 km	138.292 km/h (85.930 mph)
15	-	(France) Philippe Faure (France) Gilbert Foury	(France) Roger Faure	(Italy) Stanguellini S750	S750	200	1609.530 km	134.127 km/h (83.342 mph)
16	-	(France) Pierre Chancel (France) René Chancel	N/A	(France) Monopole Panhard	S750	197	1582.310 km	131.859 km/h (81.933 mph)
17	18	(France) Fernand Carpentier (France) Marcel Picart	(France) Deutsch-Bonnet	(France) D.B. - Panhard	S750	193	1554.148 km	129.512 km/h (80.475 mph)
18	-	(Netherlands) Joseph Hubert Göttgens (Belgium) Herman Van Den Driesche	N/A	(United Kingdom) Triumph	S2.0	192	1545.383 km	128.781 km/h (80.020 mph)
19	17	(France) Robert Mougin (Belgium) Louis Cornet	(France) Deutsch-Bonnet	(France) D.B. HBR4 Panhard	S750	191	1540.455 km	128.371 km/h (79.766 mph)
20	-	(France) Jean-Marie Dumazer (France) Lucien Campion	N/A	(France) VP 166R, Renault	S750	185	1488.660 km	124.055 km/h (77.084 mph)
21	-	(Belgium) Lucien Bianchi (Belgium) Christian Poirot	N/A	(France) VP 166R, Renault	S750	183	1474.181 km	122.848 km/h (76.334 mph)
22	-	(France) Louis van Steen (France) Guy Sourzat	N/A	(France) Panhard	S750	183	1473.625 km	122.602 km/h (76.181 mph)
23	-	(Belgium) Michel Ringoir (Belgium) Scheid	N/A	(United Kingdom) AC - Bristol	S2.0	135	1091.444 km	90.953 km/h (56.515 mph)

=== Podium by class ===
Class	Pos	Drivers	Team	Constructor	Laps	Distance	km/h - mph av.
S3.5	1	(United Kingdom) Duncan Hamilton (United Kingdom) Ivor Bueb	(United Kingdom) Jaguar Cars Ltd.	(United Kingdom) Jaguar D-type	267	2143.735 km	178.644 km/h (111.004 mph)
S3.5	2	(United Kingdom) Mike Hawthorn (Belgium) Paul Frère	(United Kingdom) Jaguar Cars Ltd.	(United Kingdom) Jaguar D-type	266	2135.395 km	177.949 km/h (110.572 mph)
S3.5	3	(United Kingdom) Desmond Titterington (United Kingdom) Jack Fairman	(United Kingdom) Jaguar Cars Ltd.	(United Kingdom) Jaguar D-type	265	2127.059 km	177.254 km/h (110.140 mph)
S2.0	1	(France) François Picard (France) Robert Manzon	(France) Cercle Los Amigos	(Italy) Ferrari 500 TR	245	1971.044 km	164.253 km/h (102.062 mph)
S2.0	2	(France) Élie Bayol (Brazil) Hermano da Silva Ramos	(Brazil) H. da Silva Ramos	(France) Gordini T15S 2.0	244	1959.721 km	163.310 km/h (101.476 mph)
S2.0	3	(France) Jean Guichet (France) Jean-Claude Vidilles	N/A	(Italy) Ferrari 500 Mondial	209	1677.248 km	139.770 km/h (86.849 mph)
S1.5	1	(Germany) Richard von Frankenberg (France) Claude Storez	(France) Auguste Veuillet	(Germany) Porsche 550 RS	246	1974.870 km	164,572 km/h (102.260 mph)
S1.5	2	(Belgium) Christian Goethals (Belgium) P. Goethals	N/A	(Germany) Porsche 550	229	1837.608 km	153.134 km/h (95.153 mph)
S1.5	3	(Belgium) Georges Harris (Belgium) Georges Hacquin	N/A	(Germany) Porsche	207	1665.028 km	138.752 km/h (86.216 mph)
S750	1	(France) Jacques Blaché (France) Louis Pons	(France) Pierre Ferry	(France) Ferry F750 Renault	211	1690.302 km	140.658 km/h (87.400 mph)
S750	2	(France) Philippe Faure (France) Gilbert Foury	(France) Roger Faure	(Italy) Stanguellini S750	200	1609.530 km	134.127 km/h (83.342 mph)
S750	3	(France) Pierre Chancel (France) René Chancel	N/A	(France) Monopole Panhard	197	1582.310 km	131.859 km/h (81.933 mph)
