= Van der Valk Hotel Paris CDG Airport =

Hotel in Paris, France

Coordinates: 48°59′27″N 2°30′56″E

- Hotel chain: Van der Valk

General information
- Location: Roissy-en-France, 351, Avenue du Bois de la Pie CS 95912 Paris Nord 2
- Opening: 1992

Design and construction
- Architect: Helmut Jahn

Other information
- Number of rooms: 388
- Number of suites: 13
- Number of restaurants: 1
- Parking: Yes

Website
- https://www.hotelpariscdgairport.com/

Van der Valk Hotel Paris CDG Airport is a 4-star hotel inaugurated in 1992 (under the name Hyatt Regency Paris CDG), located close to the Paris Charles de Gaulle international airport and Villepinte exhibition center. It belongs to the Dutch hotel company Van der Valk.

== Design ==
The Van der Valk Hotel Paris CDG Airport has 388 guestrooms and suites, two restaurants, a convention center, a fitness center, and two outdoor tennis courts. The hotel was designed by German architect Helmut Jahn. Its interior includes works by artists Denis Rival and James Hull. The lobby connects to a 21-metre-high glass atrium containing the Cosmos bar and the main hotel restaurant, the Apollo. The atrium also contains the hotel's emblem, a sculpture by Canadian sculptor Evan Penn.

== Location ==
The Van der Valk Hotel Paris CDG Airport is located between the international Paris Charles de Gaulle airport and the Villepinte exhibition center. It is accessible by the A1, A3 and A4 motorways.
