= 1954 Circuit de Cadours =

- Non-championship race in the 1954 Formula One season

Race details
- Date: 12 September 1954
- Official name: VI Circuit de Cadours
- Location: Cadours, Tarn-et-Garonne, France
- Course: Temporary Road Circuit
- Course length: 4.09 km (2.55 miles)
- Distance: (final) 30 laps, 122.71 km (76.50 miles)

Fastest lap
Drivers	(France) Jean Behra	Gordini
	(Belgium) André Pilette	Gordini
- Time: 1:55

Podium
First	(France) Jean Behra	Gordini
Second	(Belgium) André Pilette	Gordini
Third	(France) Louis Rosier	Maserati

The 6th Circuit de Cadours was a non-championship Formula One motor race held on 12 September 1954 at the Circuit de Cadours, in Cadours, Tarn-et-Garonne, France. The race, consisting of 2x15 lap heats and a 30 lap final, was won by Jean Behra in a Gordini. Behra's team-mate André Pilette finished second and Louis Rosier in a Maserati was third. Behra and Pilette set joint fastest lap.

== Classification ==
=== Race ===
Pos	No	Driver	Entrant	Car	Time/Retired
1	8	(France) Jean Behra	Equipe Gordini	Gordini Type 16	58:49.8
2	10	(Belgium) André Pilette	Equipe Gordini	Gordini Type 16	+15.0s
3	18	(France) Louis Rosier	Equipe Rosier	Maserati 250F	+1:05.2
4	12	(United States) Fred Wacker	Equipe Gordini	Gordini Type 16	+1 lap
5	32	(France) Fernand Navarro	F. Navarro	Ferrari 625	+3 laps
Ret	16	(United States) Harry Schell	Harry Schell	Maserati A6GCM	rear axle
Ret	26	(France) Jacques Cazalot	J. Cazalot	Simca-Gordini Type 11	brakes
Ret	24	(France) Jean Thepenier	J. Thepenier	Simca-Gordini Type 15	brakes
Ret	2	(France) Marcel Balsa	M. Balsa	Jicey-BMW	shock absorber
DNS	28	(United Kingdom) Michael Young	Roebuck Engineering	Connaught A-Type-Lea Francis	retired from heat 2
DNS	30	(United Kingdom) Ted Whiteaway	E.N. Whiteaway	HWM-Alta	retired from heat 2
DNA	4	(United Kingdom) Paul Emery	Emeryson Cars	Emeryson Mk.1-Alta	car not ready
DNS	16	(Italy) Giovanni de Riu	Giovanni de Riu	Maserati A6GCM	

Previous race: 1954 Joe Fry Memorial Trophy	Formula One non-championship races 1954 season	Next race: 1954 Berlin Grand Prix
Previous race: 1953 Circuit de Cadours	Circuit de Cadours	Next race: 1955 Circuit de Cadours
