= 1953 Circuit de Cadours =

Race details
- Date: 30 August 1953
- Official name: V Circuit de Cadours
- Location: Cadours, Tarn-et-Garonne, France
- Course: Temporary Road Circuit
- Course length: 4.104 km (2.550 mi)
- Distance: 30 (final) laps, 123.124 km (76.506 mi)

Pole position
Driver	(United States) Harry Schell	Gordini
- Grid positions set by heat results

Fastest lap
Driver	(France) Maurice Trintignant	Gordini
- Time: 1:56

Podium
First	(France) Maurice Trintignant	Gordini
Second	(United States) Harry Schell	Gordini
Third	(France) Jean Behra	Gordini

The 5th Circuit de Cadours was a Formula Two motor race held on 30 August 1953 at the Circuit de Cadours, in Cadours, Tarn-et-Garonne, France. The race, consisting of 2x10 lap heats, a 10 lap repechage and a 30 lap final, was won by Maurice Trintignant in a Gordini Type 16. Trintignant's teammates Harry Schell and Jean Behra finished second and third, with Schell setting fastest lap.

== Classification ==
=== Race ===
Pos	No	Driver	Entrant	Car	Time/Retired	Grid
1	36	(France) Maurice Trintignant	Equipe Gordini	Gordini Type 16	1:00:52; 121.37 kph	4
2	34	(United States) Harry Schell	Equipe Gordini	Gordini Type 16	+4s	1
3	40	(France) Jean Behra	Equipe Gordini	Gordini Type 16	+5s	5
4	2	(France) Louis Rosier	Ecurie Rosier	Ferrari 500	+53s	2
5	14	(Belgium) Charles de Tornaco	Ecurie Francorchamps	Ferrari 500	+1:27	9
6	24	(United Kingdom) Ken Wharton	Ken Wharton	Cooper T23-Bristol	+2:07	6
7	12	(France) Yves Giraud-Cabantous	HW Motors Ltd.	HWM-Alta	+1 lap, puncture/crash	7
Ret.	8	(United Kingdom) John Heath	HW Motors Ltd	HWM-Alta	20 laps	10
Ret.	10	(United Kingdom) Lance Macklin	HW Motors Ltd	HWM-Alta	18 laps	8
Ret.	4	(France) Élie Bayol	Élie Bayol	O.S.C.A. Tipo 20	1 lap, transmission	3

Previous race: 1953 Newcastle Journal Trophy	Formula One non-championship races 1953 season	Next race: 1953 RedeX Trophy
Previous race: 1952 Circuit de Cadours	Circuit de Cadours	Next race: 1954 Circuit de Cadours
