= 1952 Circuit de Cadours =

Race details
- Date: 14 September 1952
- Official name: IV Circuit de Cadours
- Location: Cadours, Tarn-et-Garonne, France
- Course: Temporary Road Circuit
- Course length: 5.537 km (3.441 mi)
- Distance: 30 (final) laps, 166.096 km (103.207 mi)

Pole position
Driver	(France) Louis Rosier	Ferrari
- Time: 1:58

Fastest lap
Driver	(United States) Harry Schell	Gordini
- Time: 2:00

Podium
First	(France) Louis Rosier	Ferrari
Second	(United States) Harry Schell	Gordini
Third	(Switzerland) Emmanuel de Graffenried	Maserati

The 4th Circuit de Cadours was a Formula Two motor race held on 14 September 1952 at the Circuit de Cadours, in Cadours, Tarn-et-Garonne, France. The race, consisting of 2x15 lap heats and a 30 lap final, was won by Louis Rosier in a Ferrari 500. Harry Schell finished second in a Gordini Type 16, and set fastest lap, and Emmanuel de Graffenried was third in a Maserati 4CLT/48.

== Classification ==
=== Race ===
Pos	No	Driver	Entrant	Car	Time/Retired
1	24	(France) Louis Rosier	Ecurie Rosier	Ferrari 500	1:01:42; 117.17 kph
2	28	(United States) Harry Schell	Equipe Gordini	Gordini Type 16	+45s
3	30	(Switzerland) Emmanuel de Graffenried	Scuderia Enrico Platé	Maserati 4CLT/48	+1:15
4	16	(France) Yves Giraud-Cabantous	HW Motors Ltd	HWM-Alta	+1:28
5	18	(Australia) Tony Gaze	HW Motors Ltd	HWM-Alta	+1 lap
6	22	(France) Marcel Balsa	Marcel Balsa	BMW Special-BMW 328	+2 laps
Ret	26	(France) Armand Philippe	Ecurie Rosier	Ferrari 166	22 laps, mechanical
Ret	32	(Argentina) Alberto Crespo	Scuderia Enrico Platé	Maserati 4CLT/48	17 laps, suspension
Ret	34	(Germany) Willi Heeks	Willi Heeks	AFW-BMW	10 laps, mechanical
Ret	6	(Belgium) Charles de Tornaco	Ecurie Francorchamps	Ferrari 500	5 laps, valve
DNS	20	(United Kingdom) Peter Collins	HW Motors Ltd	HWM-Alta	cylinder head
DNQ	10	(France) André Loens	Fraser-Hartwell Syndicate	Cooper T20-Bristol	Ret, heat 1
DNQ	36	(France) Jacques Pollet	Jacques Pollet	Simca Gordini Type 15	Ret, heat 1
DNQ	38	(France) Jean Thepenier	Jean Thepenier	Simca Gordini Type 15	Ret, heat 1
DNQ	4	(France) Roger Gerbout	Roger Gerbout	RG Speciale-BMW 328	Ret, heat 1
DNQ	42	(France) Georges Armichen	Georges Armichen	Simca 508S-Fiat	Ret, heat 2
DNQ	2	(France) René Duval	René Duval	Duval Speciale-BMW 328	Ret, heat 2
DNQ	12	(France) André Ribaut	André Ribaut	Simca Gordini Type 15	Ret, heat 1
DNS	8	(Belgium) Olivier Gendebien	Ecurie Francorchamps	Veritas RS	
DNA	14	(United Kingdom) Stirling Moss	ERA Ltd	ERA G-Type-Bristol	
DNA	40	(France) Jean Galy		GS Speciale-Simca	

Previous race: 1952 Modena Grand Prix	Formula One non-championship races 1952 season	Next race: 1952 Madgwick Cup
Previous race: 1951 Circuit de Cadours	Circuit de Cadours	Next race: 1953 Circuit de Cadours
