= Desmond Titterington =

British racing driver (1928–2002)

- Born: 1 May 1928; Cultra, County Down, Northern Ireland
- Died: 13 April 2002 (aged 73); Dundee, Scotland

Formula One World Championship career
- Nationality: (United Kingdom) British
- Active years: 1956
- Team: Connaught
- Entries: 1
- Championships: 0
- Wins: 0
- Podiums: 0
- Career points: 0
- Pole positions: 0
- Fastest laps: 0
- First entry: 1956 British Grand Prix

James Desmond Titterington (1 May 1928 – 13 April 2002) was a British racing driver from Northern Ireland. He participated in one Formula One World Championship Grand Prix, on 14 July 1956, scoring no championship points. He also competed in several non-Championship Grand Prix.

== Early life ==
Born in Cultra, near Holywood, County Down, Northern Ireland, Titterington went to school in Scotland during the Second World War and then attended the University of St Andrews before returning to Northern Ireland. When he returned, he bought a J2 MG and started driving in minor club races. In 1951, he acquired an Allard J2, and the following year, he won the Leinster Trophy, before going on to win the Phoenix Park Formula Libre Race in 1953.

== Jaguar ==
In 1954, Titterington joined the Ecurie Ecosse team and placed well at several British club events, while occasionally racing his own Triumph TR2.The following year he raced for both Ecurie Ecosse and the Jaguar works team, winning the Ulster Trophy and finishing second at the Goodwood 9 Hours. He was a witness to the 1955 Le Mans disaster as he was in the pits due to being injured prior to the race. Titterington blamed his teammate Mike Hawthorn for the crash due to his exuberant driving style when pitting, though the official inquiry later exonerated Hawthorn. He raced in the 1955 RAC Tourist Trophy at Dundrod Circuit in his native Northern Ireland, the first championship race since Le Mans, alongside Hawthorn in a Jaguar D-Type. The Jaguar team were winning in the race and holding off the Daimler-Benz's Mercedes-Benz 300 SLRs but Hawthorn accidentally put the car into the wrong gear when accelerating out of a corner and broke a connecting rod on the car and blew the engine, leading to the Jaguar team having to retire. Titterington drove for Jaguar at the 1956 Le Mans 24 Hours but besides crashing his car in practice he lost the opportunity to drive in the race when teammate Paul Frère was eliminated in an accident on the first lap.

Titterington also drove for Mercedes-Benz at the 1955 Targa Florio in Sicily, the last round of the Sports Car championship that year. He and co-driver John Fitch finished fourth in the race.

== Connaught and Formula One ==
In 1956, Titterington was selected to drive for the Connaught racing team. His first race was the 1956 Syracuse Grand Prix. Qualifying eighth on the grid, he had to retire due to ignition trouble. At his only World Championship race, the 1956 British Grand Prix, he qualified 11th on the grid and despite a poor start, managed to drive back up to 11th but had to retire due to engine failure. His best result with Connaught was third place at the 1956 BRDC International Trophy.

Titterington retired from motor sport at the end of 1956 to concentrate on his family and his business interests. He died in Dundee, Scotland, aged 73.

== Complete Formula One World Championship results ==
(key)

Year	Entrant	Chassis	Engine	1	2	3	4	5	6	7	8	WDC	Points
1956	Connaught Engineering	Connaught Type B	Alta Straight-4	ARG	MON	500	BEL	FRA	GBR; Ret	GER	ITA	NC	0
