= Jaguar XKSS =

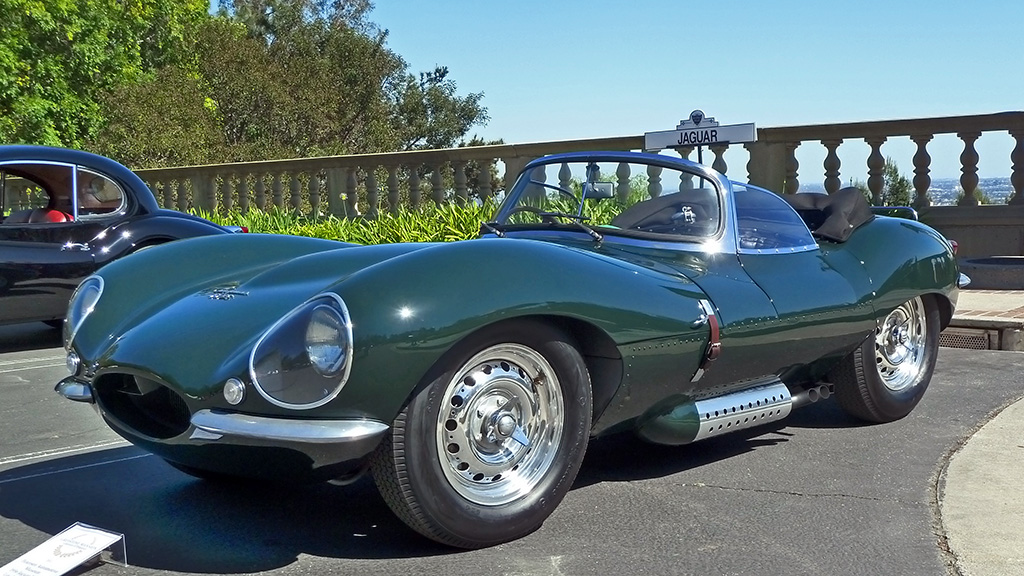
- 1956 Jaguar XKSS

Overview
- Manufacturer: Jaguar Cars
- Also called: Jaguar XK-SS
- Production: 1957; 2016–2017 (official continuations)
- Assembly: United Kingdom: Coventry

Body and chassis
- Class: Sports car
- Body style: Roadster
- Related: Jaguar D-Type

Powertrain
- Engine: 3.4L Jaguar XK6 engine I6
- Transmission: 4 speed manual

Dimensions
- Wheelbase: 2,300 mm (90.6 in)
- Length: 3,990 mm (157.1 in)
- Width: 1,660 mm (65.4 in)
- Height: 1,120 mm (44.1 in)
- Kerb weight: 921 kg (2,030 lb)

Chronology
- Successor: Jaguar E-Type

The Jaguar XKSS is a road-going version of the Jaguar D-Type racing car, initially built in 1957. Only 16 were built and sold at the time. Nine chassis were destroyed in a factory fire in 1957 before they could be completed. In 2016 Jaguar announced that a small production run of nine "continuation" XKSS reproductions would be hand-built to the original specifications to complete the originally scheduled run of 25.

== History ==
Following Jaguar's withdrawal from competition at the end of the 1956 season, a number of completed and partly completed D-types remained unsold at the Browns Lane factory. In an attempt to recoup some of the investment made in building unused chassis, and to exploit the lucrative American market for high-performance European sports cars, Sir William Lyons decided to convert a number of them to road-going specification. Structural changes would include the removal of the bulkhead to create a single driver's cockpit, the elimination of the large fin behind the driver, and the addition of a passenger-side door. In addition, numerous changes were required for cosmetic, comfort, and legal reasons to turn a basic D-type race car design into a street-legal passenger car. These included creating a full two-abreast interior; adding a full-width, chrome-surrounded windscreen; adding sidescreens to both driver and passenger doors; creating a rudimentary, folding, fabric roof; adding chromed front and rear bumpers; mounting XK140 rear light clusters high on the wings; and adding thin chrome strips to the edges of the front light fairings.

By early 1957 a total of 16 of the planned production run of 25 XKSS's had been completed at Jaguar's Browns Lane plant. On the evening of 12 February a fire broke out, destroying the remaining nine in mid-production. All of the destroyed vehicles had been destined for North America. Most of the previously built 16 XKSSs were also sold in the US.

In March 2016, Jaguar announced that it would be completing the original 25 car order by hand-building the remaining nine XKSS roadsters to the exact original specification, and assigning them the chassis numbers of the destroyed cars. The "continuation" reproductions were expected to sell for more than £1 million each.

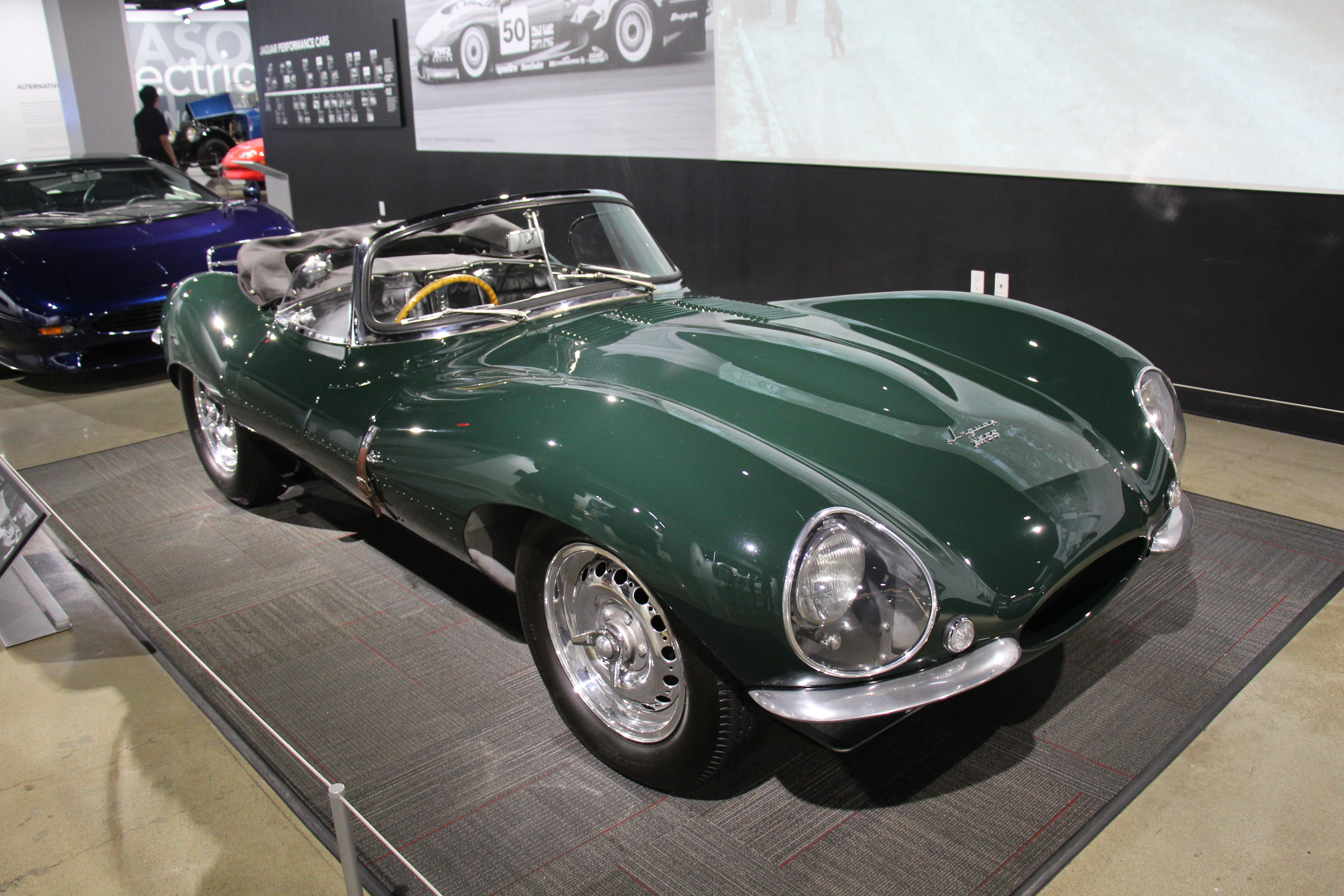
1956 XKSS Roadster

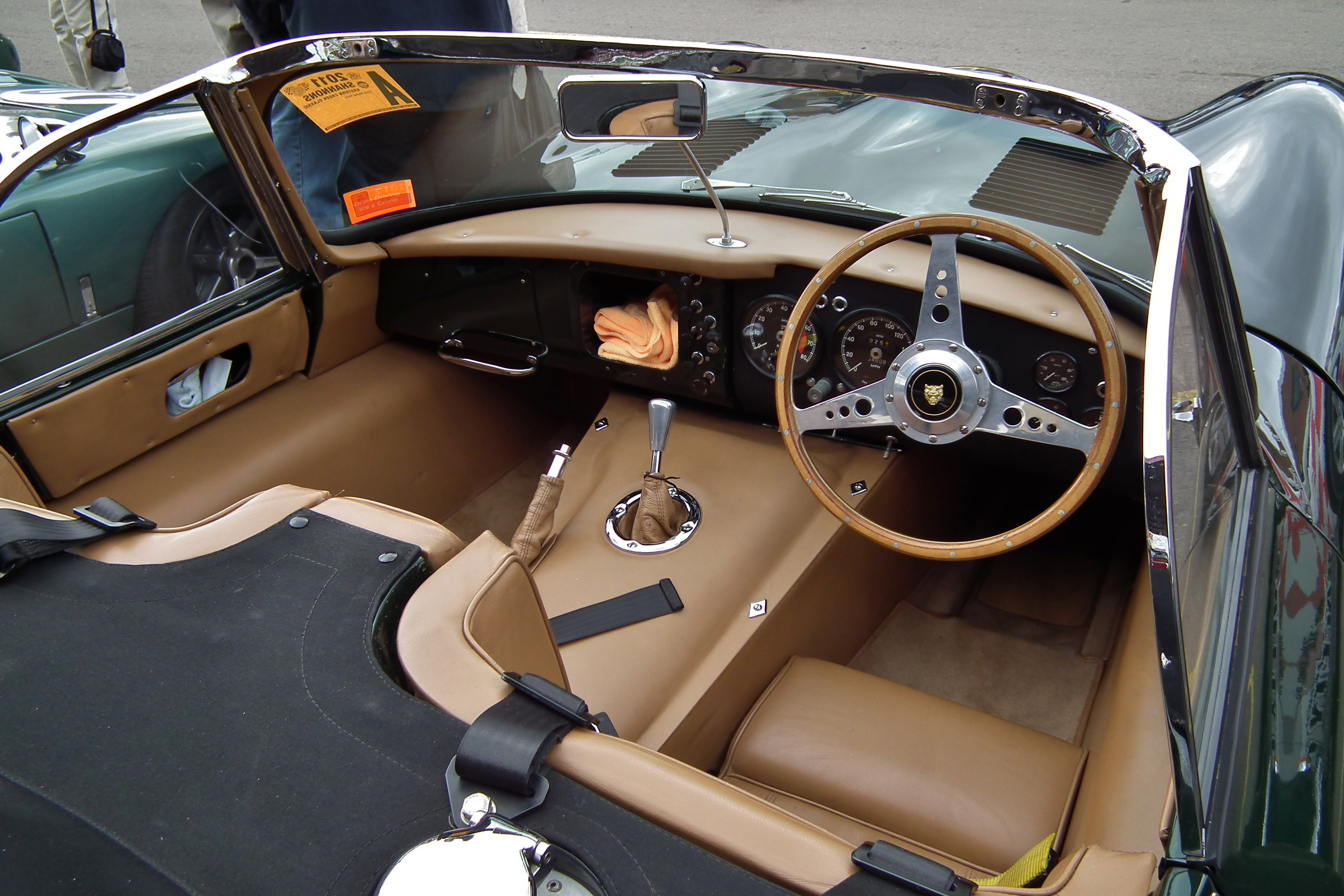
Completely restored 1957 XKSS interior

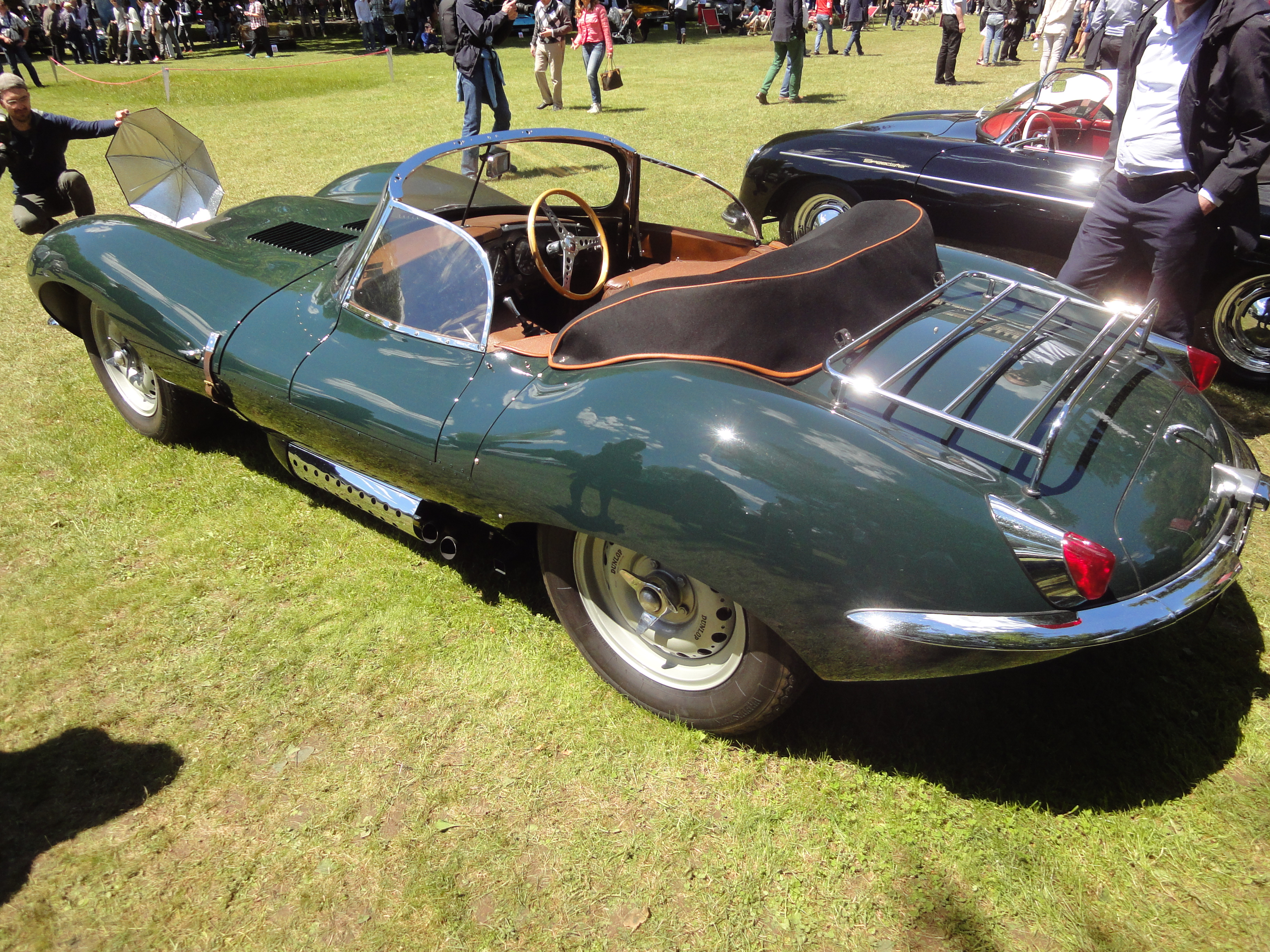
1956 Rear view

== Collectors ==
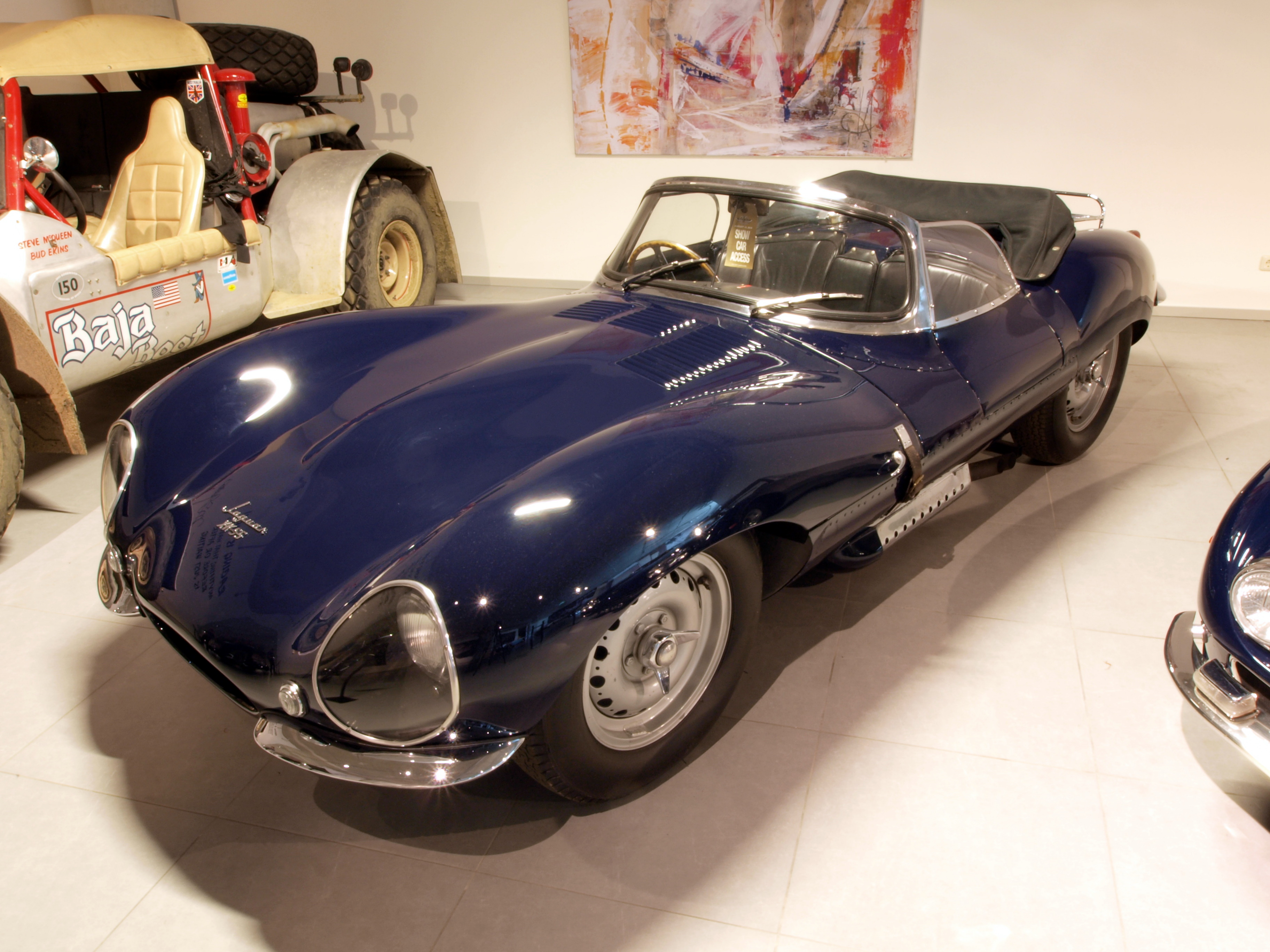
XKSS at the Louwman Museum

The American actor Steve McQueen owned a Jaguar XKSS for personal use, painted British racing green. He referred to the car as the "Green Rat". In 2010 and 2011 it toured the United States as part of the "Allure of the Automobile" exhibit. Steve McQueen's XKSS is currently on display in Los Angeles, California at the Petersen Automotive Museum.

Another XKSS, along with a D-type and C-type, formed the pinnacle of the James Hull collection, a collection of 450 British cars sold for an estimated £100 million in 2014. Other XKSS include XKSS 722 at the Louwman Museum in The Hague.
