= James Hull =

British dentist and entrepreneur

James Hull is a British dentist and entrepreneur, who owned UK's largest and one of the world's biggest private car collections.

== James Hull Associates ==
Hull opened his first dental practice in 1987 in Gwent, Wales. James Hull Associates presently has over 50 dental practices in the UK, which mainly specialise in cosmetic dentistry. After private equity firm Hutton Collins bought a 40% stake in the business in 2006, valuing it at about £90m, Hull and two fellow directors stepped down from the business's board in 2008 after the group made a loss of £8.7M. Irish businessman Emmet O Neill's Smiles dentistry group bought JHA in late 2012.

== Personal life ==
Hull, who lives in Knightsbridge, west London, has suffered from cancer three times. He enjoys playing cricket and tennis.

In May 2014, Hull emerged as the owner of one of the world's biggest private car collections, by putting the entire collection up for sale for £100M. The collection of 543 classic cars, ranging from multi-million pound Jaguars including a XKSS through to a Morris Minor, also includes: Lord Mountbatten's Mini Traveller; Winston Churchill's Austin; Mike Hailwood's 1961 Jaguar E-Type; and a Bentley formerly owned by Elton John. In July 2014 his collection was sold to Jaguar Land Rover for an undisclosed sum. Sixteen of the cars were put on show at Heritage Motor Centre, Gaydon, Warwickshire from November 2014.
