= Jaguar D-Type =

Race car produced 1954–1957

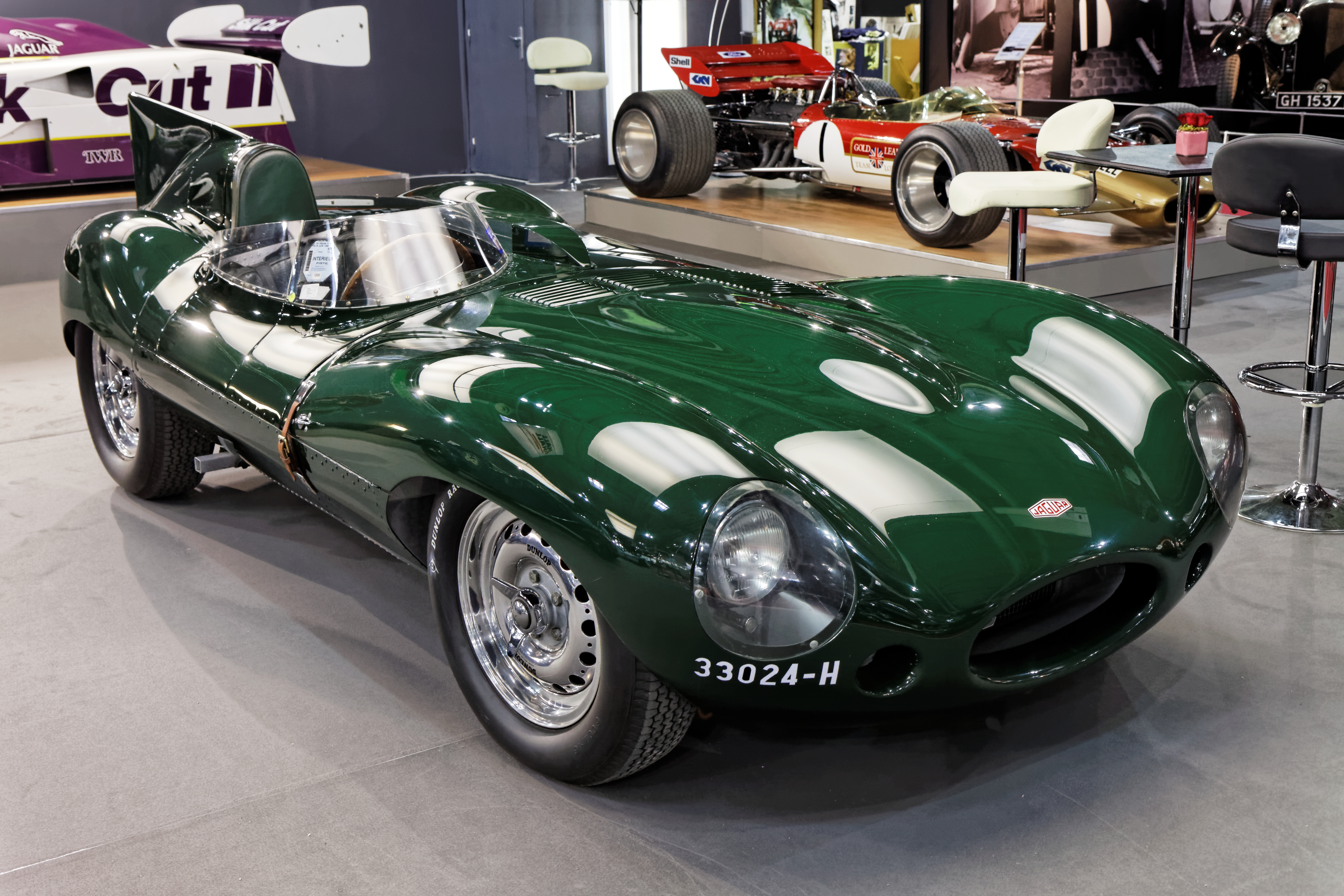
- Jaguar D-Type at Retromobile 2013

Overview
- Manufacturer: Jaguar Cars
- Production: 1954–1957
- Assembly: United Kingdom: Coventry
- Designer: Malcolm Sayer

Body and chassis
- Class: Sports racing car
- Body style: Roadster
- Layout: Front-engine, rear-wheel-drive
- Related: Jaguar XKSS

Powertrain
- Engine: 3,442 cm^{3} (210.04 cu in) XK6 I6 (1954); 3,781 cm^{3} (230.73 cu in) XK6 I6 (1957); 2,997 cm^{3} (182.89 cu in) XK6 I6 (1958)

Chronology
- Predecessor: Jaguar C-Type
- Successor: Jaguar E-Type

The Jaguar D-Type is a sports racing car that was produced by Jaguar Cars Ltd. between 1954 and 1957. Designed specifically to win the Le Mans 24-hour race, it shared the straight-6 XK engine and many mechanical components with its C-Type predecessor. Its structure, however, was radically different, with innovative monocoque construction and slippery aerodynamics that integrated aviation technology, including in some examples a distinctive vertical stabilizer.

Engine displacement began at 3.4 litres, was enlarged to 3.8 L in 1957, and reduced to 3.0 L in 1958 when Le Mans rules limited engines for sports racing cars to that maximum. D-Types won Le Mans in 1955, 1956 and 1957. After Jaguar temporarily retired from racing as a factory team, the company offered the remaining unfinished D-Types as street-legal XKSS versions, whose perfunctory road-going equipment made them eligible for production sports car races in America. In 1957 25 of these cars were in various stages of completion when a factory fire destroyed nine of them.

Total production is thought by some to have totaled 71 D-Types, including 18 for factory teams and 53 for privateers (plus an additional 16 D-Types were converted into road-legal XKSS versions). Jaguar is quoted as claiming it built 75 D-Types.

== Design ==
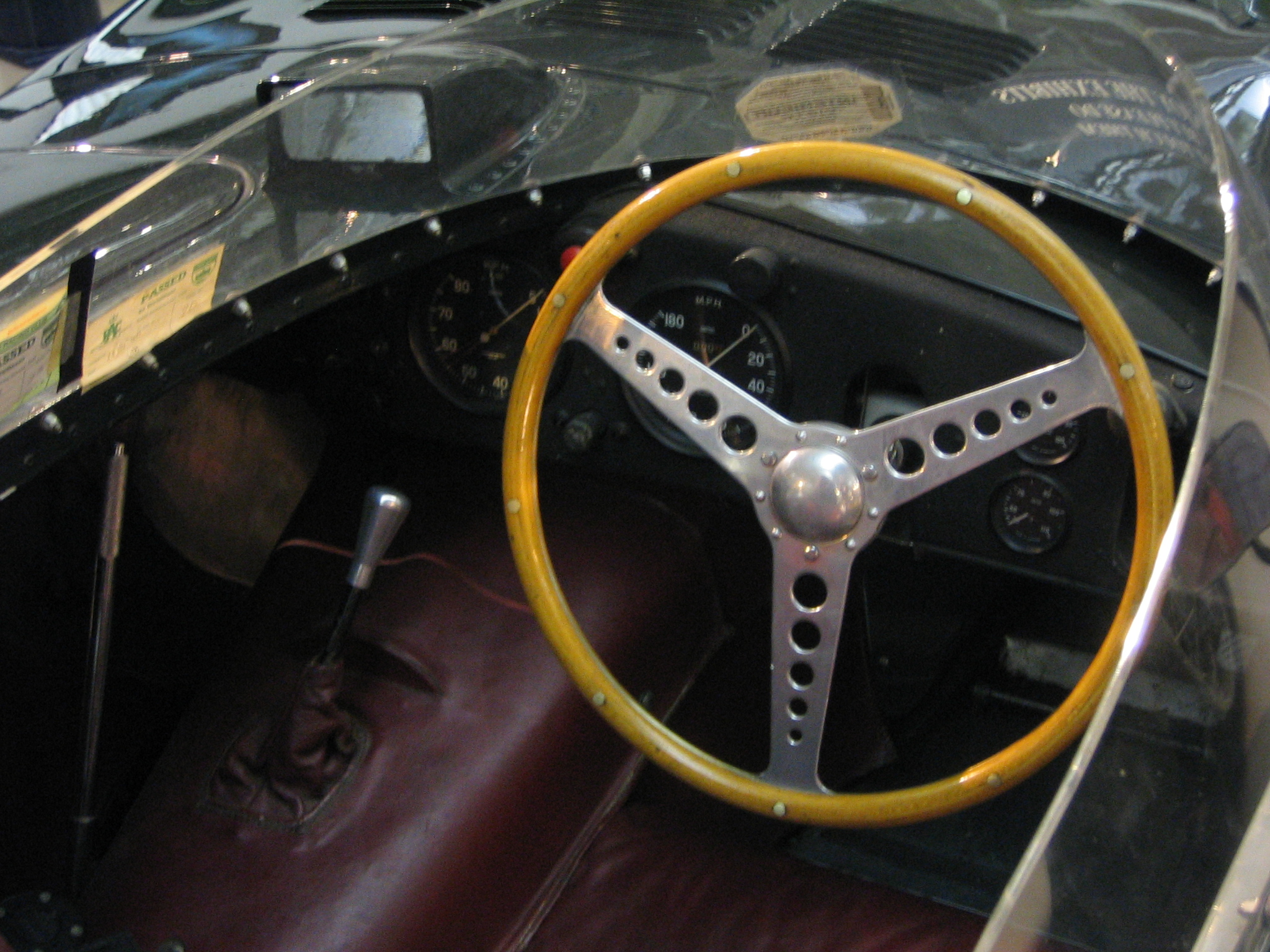
1955 cockpit

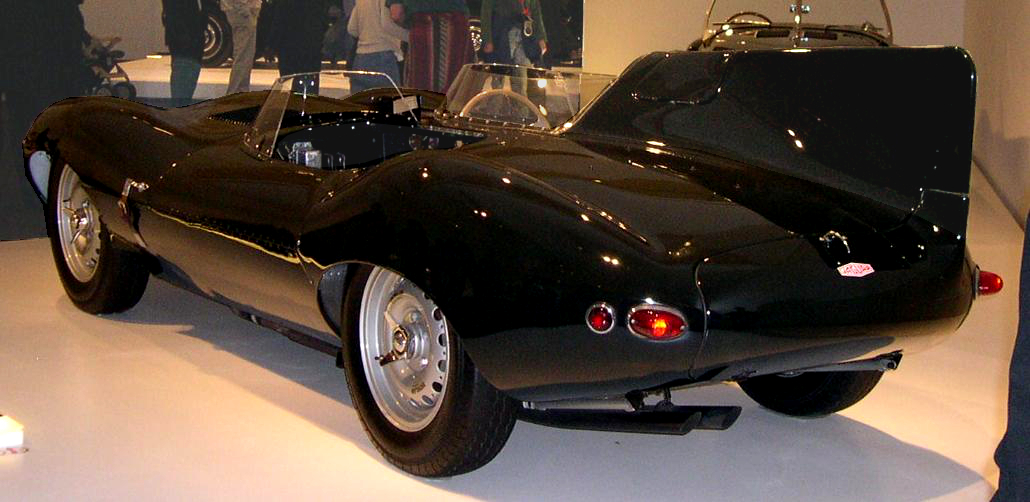
Modified twin-cockpit 1955 D-Type with stabilizing fin

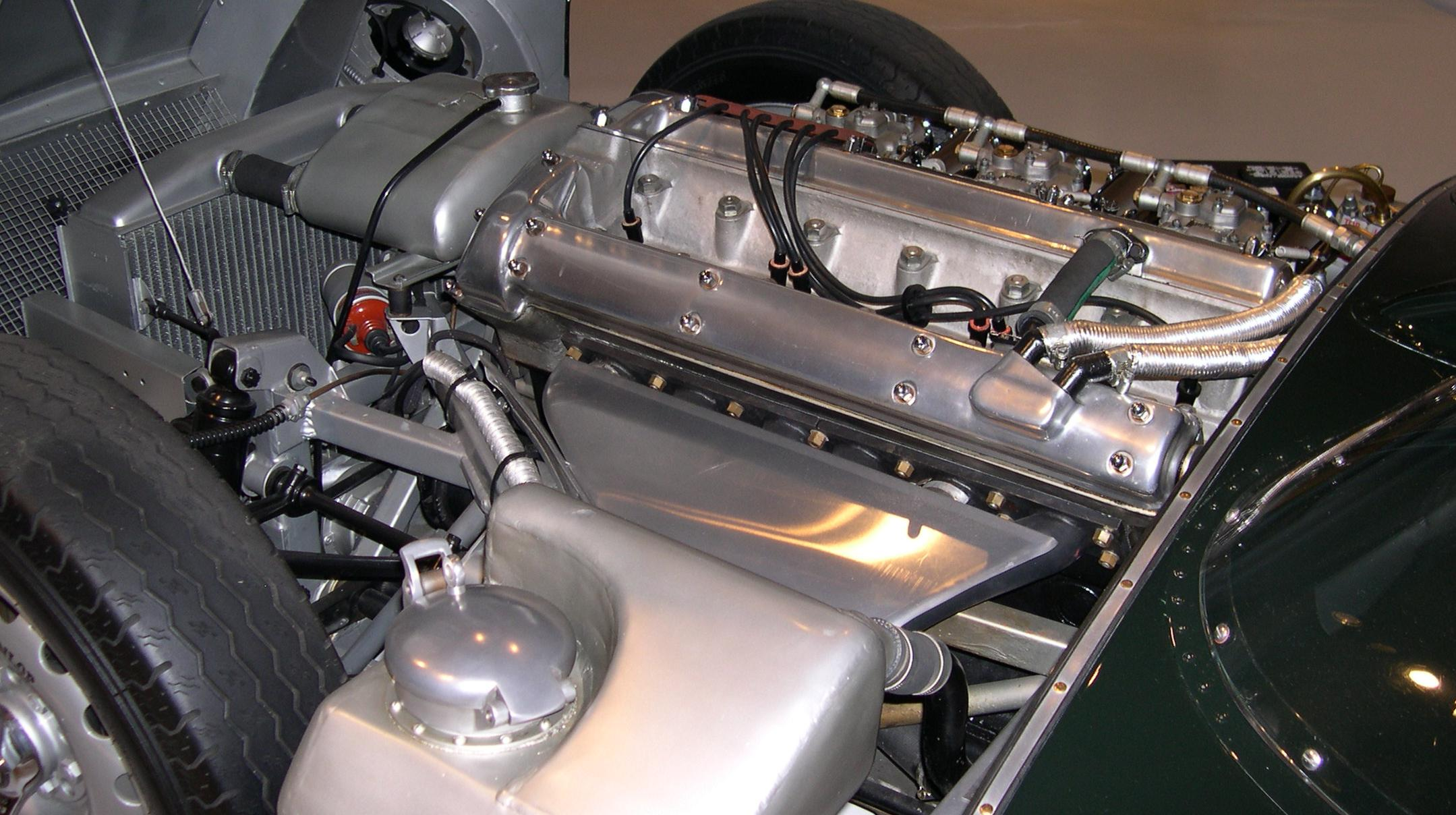
Double overhead cam 3.4 litre straight six cylinder XK6 engine

The design applied aeronautical technology, revolutionary at the time. The "tub", or cockpit section, was of monocoque construction, mostly comprising sheets of aluminium alloy. Its elliptical shape and comparatively small cross-section provided torsional rigidity and reduced drag. To the front bulkhead was attached an aluminium tubing subframe for the engine, steering assembly, and front suspension. Rear suspension and final drive were mounted to the rear bulkhead. Fuel was carried in the tail and the designers followed aviation practice by specifying a deformable Marston Aviation Division bag in place of a conventional tank.

The aerodynamic influence and overall body design was the work of Malcolm Sayer, who had joined Jaguar following a stint with the Bristol Aeroplane Company during the Second World War and later worked on the C-Type. The D-Type required a minimal frontal area. To reduce the XK engine's height dry sump lubrication was developed, and it has been said that the car's frontal area was also a consideration in canting the engine at 8½° from the vertical (which necessitated the offset bonnet bulge). Philip Porter, in his book Jaguar Sports Racing Cars, says that "[a] more likely reason was to provide extra space for the ram pipes feeding the three twin-choke Weber carburettors." Reducing underbody drag contributed to the car's high top speed; for the long Mulsanne Straight at Le Mans, a fin was mounted behind the driver for aerodynamic stability. For the 1955 season, factory cars were fitted with a longer nose, which lengthened the car by 7½ inches and further increased maximum speed; and the headrest fairing and aerodynamic fin were combined as a single unit that smoothed the aerodynamics and saved weight.

Mechanically, many features were shared with the outgoing C-Type. Its front and rear suspension and innovative all-round disc brakes were retained, as was the XK engine. Apart from the new lubrication system, the engine was further revised as development progressed during the D-Type's competition life. Notably in 1955, larger valves were introduced, together with asymmetrical cylinder heads to accommodate them.

Elements of the body shape and many construction details were used in the Jaguar E-Type from 1961 to 1969.

== Competition history ==
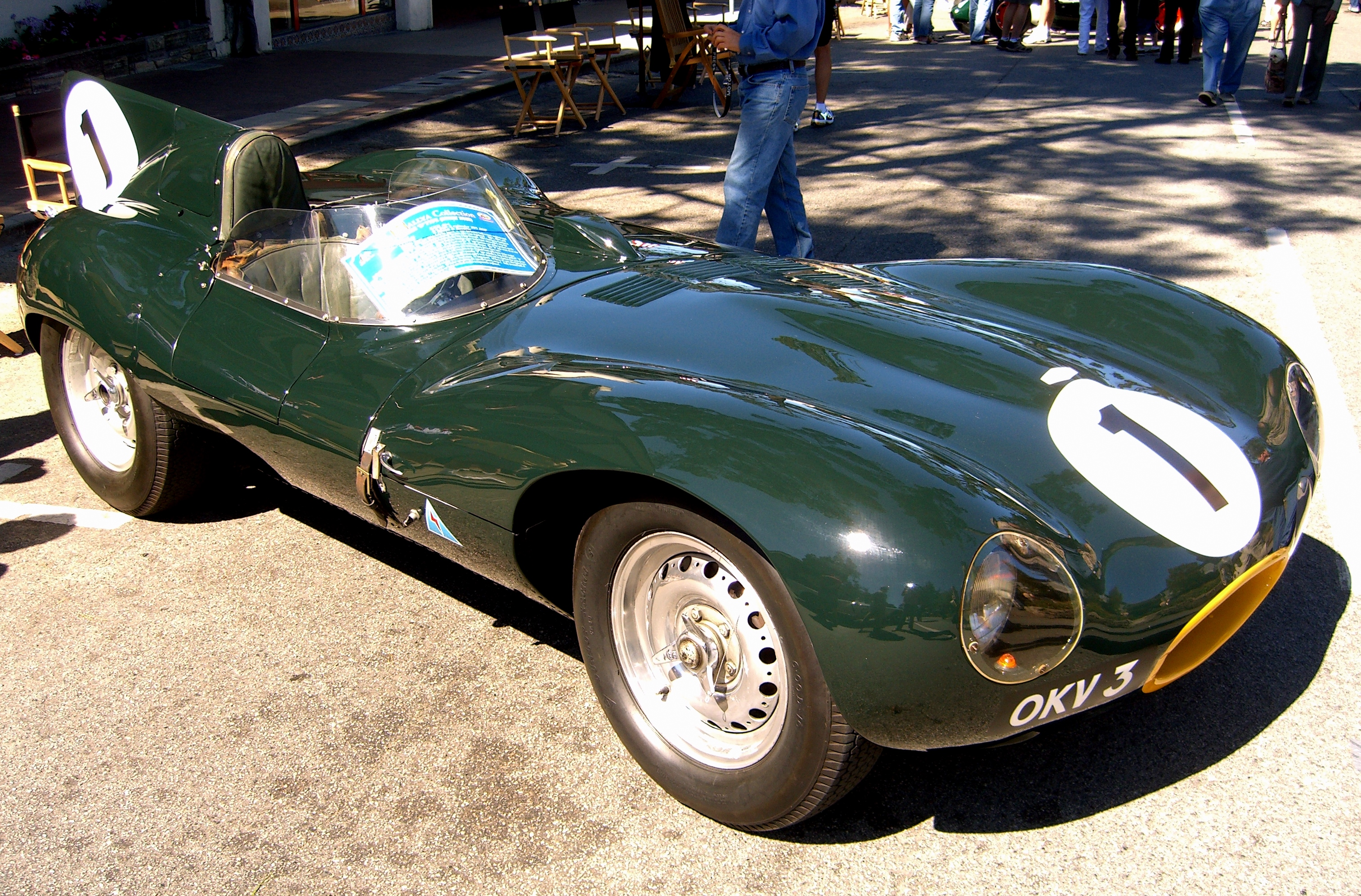
D-Type XKD403, winner of the 1954 Reims 12 Hours race

Jaguar D-Types fielded by a team under the leadership of Jaguar's racing manager Lofty England were expected to perform well in their debut at the 1954 24 Hours of Le Mans race. In the event, the cars were hampered by fuel starvation caused by problems with the fuel filters, necessitating pit stops for their removal, after which the entry driven by Duncan Hamilton and Tony Rolt speeded up to finish less than a lap behind the winning Ferrari. The D-Type's aerodynamic superiority is evident from its maximum speed of 172.8 mph (278.1 km/h) on the Mulsanne Straight compared with the 4.9 litre Ferrari's 160.1 mph (257.7 km/h). Three weeks later the D Type won the Rheims 12 hour endurance race.

For 1955 the cars were modified with long-nose bodywork and engines uprated with larger valves. At Le Mans, they proved competitive with the Mercedes-Benz 300 SLRs, which had been expected to win. Mike Hawthorn's D-Type had a narrow lead over Juan Manuel Fangio's Mercedes when another Mercedes team car was involved in the most catastrophic accident in motorsport history. Driver Pierre Levegh and more than 80 spectators lost their lives, while many more were injured.

Mercedes withdrew from the race. Jaguar opted to continue, and the D-Type driven by Hawthorn and Ivor Bueb went on to win.

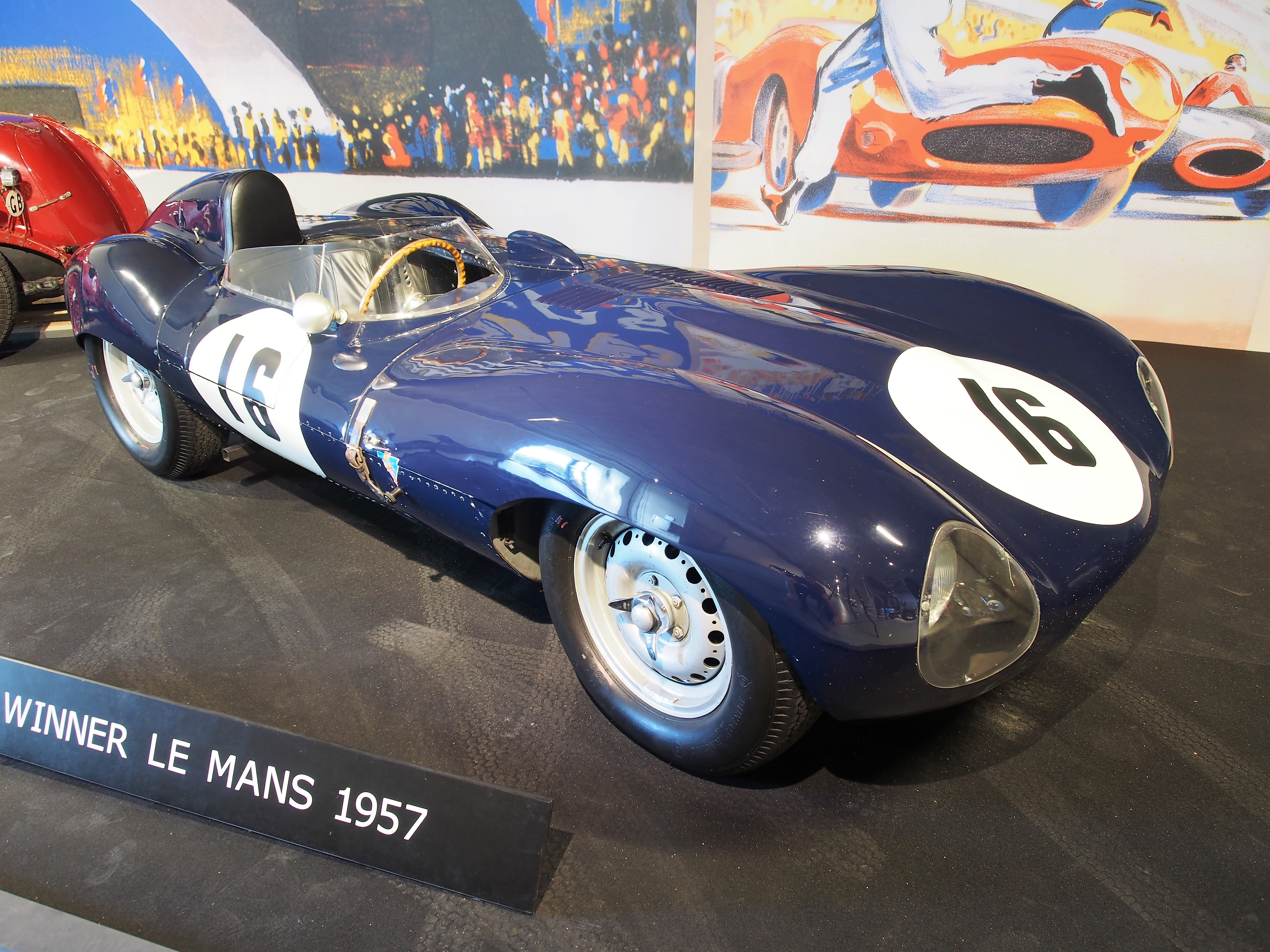
D-Type XKD606, winner of the 1957 Le Mans 24 Hours race, in Ecurie Ecosse metallic "flag blue" livery

Mercedes withdrew from motorsport at the end of the 1955 season, and Jaguar again entered Le Mans in 1956. Although only one of the three factory-entered cars finished, in sixth place, the race was won by a D-Type entered by the small Edinburgh-based team Ecurie Ecosse and driven by Ron Flockhart and Ninian Sanderson, beating works teams from Aston Martin and Scuderia Ferrari.

In America, the Cunningham team raced several D-Types. In 1955, for example, a 1954 works car on loan to Cunningham won the Sebring 12 Hours in the hands of Mike Hawthorn and Phil Walters, and in May 1956 the team's entries for Maryland's Cumberland national championship sports car race included four D-Types in Cunningham's white and blue racing colors. Driven by John Fitch, John Gordon Benett, Sherwood Johnston and team owner Briggs Cunningham, they finished fourth, fifth, seventh and eighth, respectively.

1956 Jaguar D-Type Long Nose
Jaguar D-Type Long Nose at Goodwood Festival of Speed 2009

Although Jaguar withdrew from motorsport at the end of the 1956 season, 1957 proved to be the D-Type's most successful year. 3.8-litre engine Jaguar D-Types took five of the top six places at Le Mans, and Ecurie Ecosse, with considerable support from Jaguar, finished first and second, the best result in the D-Type's racing history.

Rules for the 1958 Le Mans race limited engine sizes to three litres for sports racing cars, which ended the domination of the 3.8-litre D-Type. Jaguar developed a 3.0 litre version to power D-Types in the 1958, 1959 and 1960 Le Mans races, but it proved unreliable, and by 1960 no longer produced sufficient power to be competitive.

The D-Type never again achieved a podium finish at Le Mans. Its success waned as support from Jaguar decreased and cars from rival manufacturers became more competitive, although from 1960 the D Type continued for a further three years or more to be one of the cars to beat in club racing and national events.

== XKSS ==
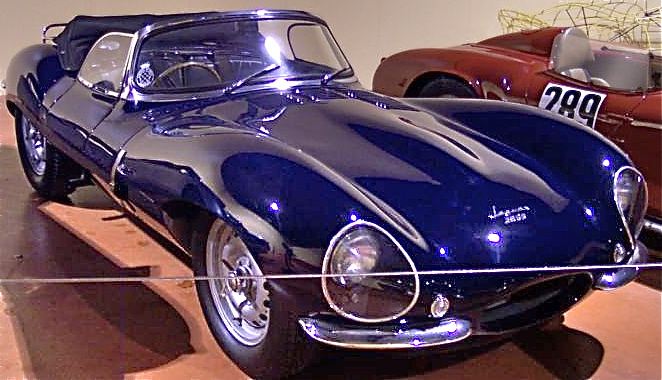
Road-equipped XKSS

After Jaguar temporarily retired from racing as a factory team in 1956, the company offered the remaining unfinished D-Types as XKSS versions whose additional road-going equipment—including a passenger seat, passenger-side door, side windows, full-width framed windscreen and windscreen wipers, trimmed interior, folding hood, and bumpers—made them eligible for production sports car races in America.

On the evening of 12 February 1957, a fire broke out at Jaguar's Browns Lane plant and destroyed nine of the 25 cars that were in various stages of completion. With the requisite jigs and tooling also destroyed, this effectively ended production of the XKSS version, although Jaguar later converted two additional D-Types that had not been part of the intended XKSS production run.

In March 2016, Jaguar announced that it would be completing the original 25 XKSS order by hand-building the remaining nine XKSS roadsters to the exact original specification, and assigning them the chassis numbers of the destroyed cars. The "continuation" reproductions were expected to sell for more than £1 million each.

== Jaguar D-Type continuation ==
Jaguar announced the planned production of 25 D-Type "continuation" vehicles to be hand-built at the Warwickshire, UK workshop to complete Jaguar's original goal of producing 100 D-Type based cars (the last twenty-five of which were to be turned into road-legal XKSS versions). Available options include 1955 short-nose or 1956 long-nose bodywork.

Given that Jaguar originally intended to build 100 D-Types, and allocated 100 chassis numbers for them, the combination of the 75 Jaguar claims it already built in the 1950s, plus the 25 XKSS conversions (built in two installments, 16 in 1957 and 9 more starting in 2016), accounts for all 100 original chassis numbers. It is unknown what numbers were to be assigned to the 25 additional "continuation" Type-D's.

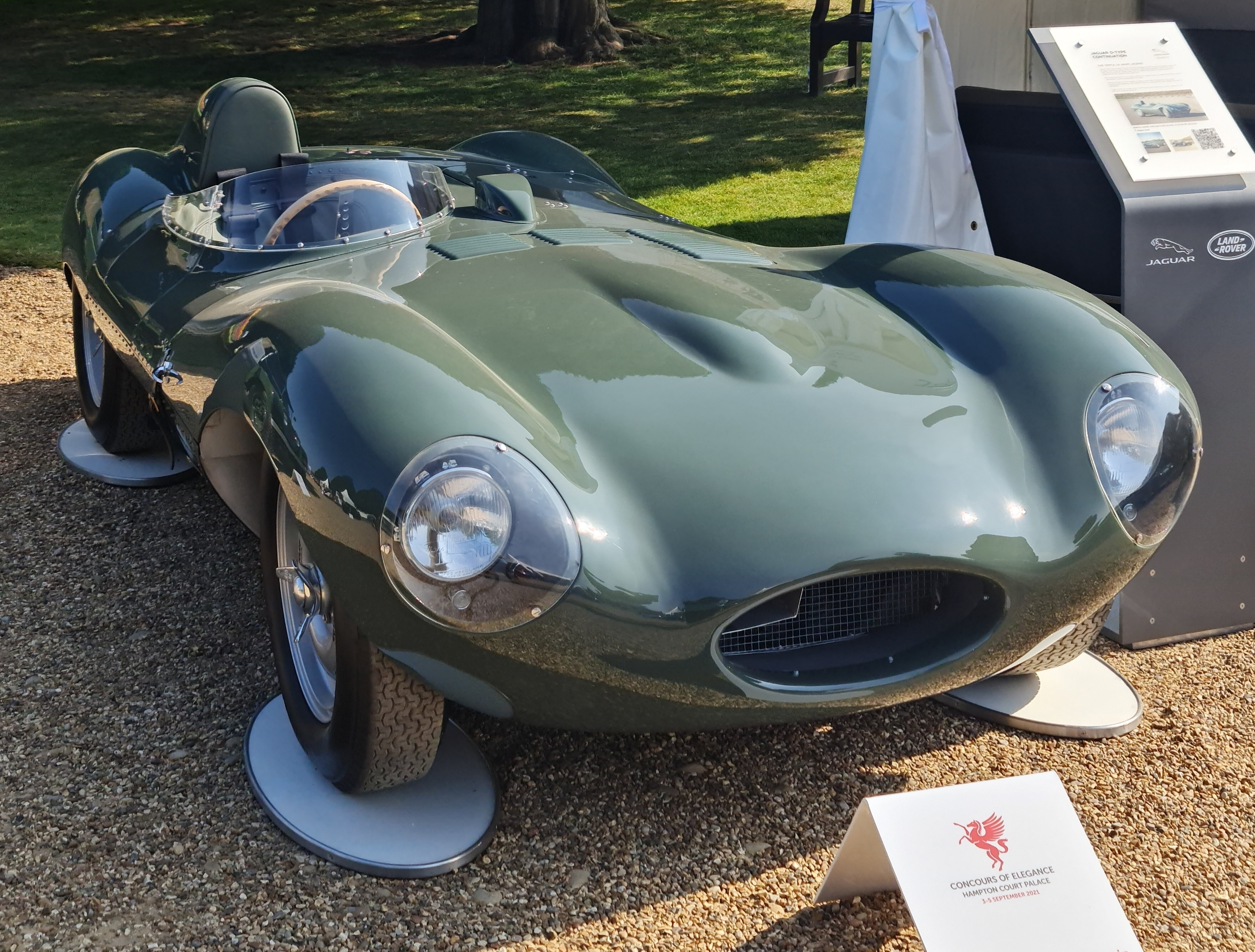
D-Type Continuation

The vehicle was unveiled in Salon Rétromobile 2018 in Paris.

== Value ==
A 1955 model was sold at a RM Sotheby's auction in Monterey in 2016 for $21,780,000 (£16,641,143). This is the most expensive Jaguar ever to sell at auction.
