= Circuit de Cadours =

Race track in France

- Location: Cadours, Haute-Garonne, France
- Coordinates: 43°44′08″N 1°02′24″E
- Website: http://circuitdecadours.com/
- Length: 3.940 km (2.448 miles)

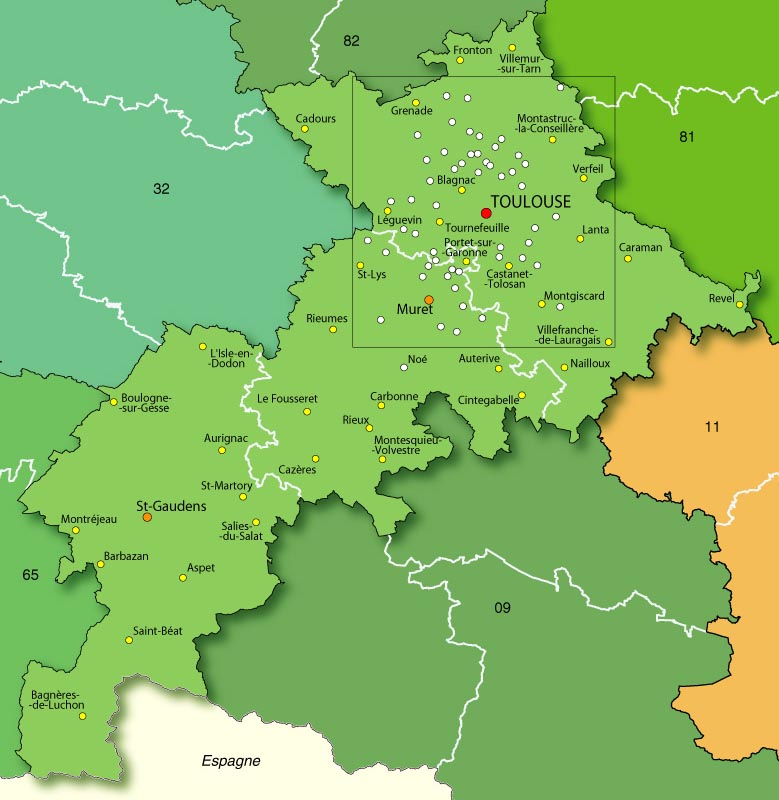
Haute Garonne department

The Circuit de Cadours was a race track located in the southwest of France, in the Haute-Garonne département.

== Historic race track of Cadours Laréole ==
Cadours is now part of the Toulouse city district. At the time of the start of the race-track, Cadours and more importantly its 600 inhabitants had demonstrated their capability to organise important events: a "first flight event" in the 1920s, air shows later, horse races and cycle races, in the years before World War II.

Louis Arrivet, an inhabitant from Cadours, together with friends, decided to establish an automobile event. He was a local mechanic and owned a car repair shop in the middle of the village. He was a fan of interesting pieces of machinery. He owned a Bugatti 47. He was also an engine tuning specialist and his skills were well known beyond the limits of the county. His address book was impressive, it included a range of sports car enthusiasts which allowed him, with the help of a newly appointed organizing committee, to bring together about 20 competitors for a first event called "Cadours Stop and Go". The committee included M. Gros, M. Gabrielle as secretary and M. Arrivet. They went to the Laguépie race track in the nearby département to pick some good ideas. They decided to select the triangle formed by the D29, D89 and D41, all secondary tortuous roads, to form the Cadours Circuit or race-track, located just outside the village of Cadours; bales of straw would prevent major crashes while few wooden cabins would become the pits. On September 18, 1948 about twenty cars had registered for the event, with René Mauriès in a Simca Gordini, Michel Lecerf (Simca, prepared by Roger Deho), Roger Armichen (Simca), Robert Galy (Galy Spéciale) and Émile Py (Py, using Citroën Traction Avant parts). The race was won by René Mauriès, from Albi, for this first event, at an average speed of 121.97 km/h (75.79 mph) on the 4,015 m (2.5 mi) race track.

== 1949: a new Grand-Prix ==
For the 1949 season, Arrivet and his crew achieved Grand-Prix status for the event, the Grand-Prix of Cadours by the French Automobile Club in the Voiturette/Formula 2 category. The event was launched and became an International Grand-Prix event in the following years, where big shots would come at the end of the racing season to harvest a couple of missing points to ensure a proper ranking or would come to finish adjustments of their next season's race cars. The first Grand Prix de Cadours was raced on 18 September 1949, in front of more than 3000 spectators. It was a success. Gerbout, from Paris, came with his Gerbout Spéciale (an old Lombard) and won the race.

In 1950, the committee decided to meet with reputable competitors assembled at a nearby event on the Lespare race track, near Bordeaux, where a Formula 2 challenge is organized, to persuade them to come to race in Cadours. It was a success. Starters included Aldo Gordini, René Bonnet, Élie Bayol, Marcel Balsa, René Simone, Harry Schell and Raymond Sommer. Also a motorcycle event was organized in conjunction with the race car event, improving further the recognition of the event and the race track.

=== Tragic accident ===
This second Grand Prix, in 1950, was marred by the accidental death of Raymond Sommer, who died in a crash following the failure of the steering mechanism of his Cooper T12-Jap.

On September 9, 1951, the following year, before the start of the third 'Grand Prix de Cadours', a monument sculpted by Lucien Passey, to the memory of Raymond Sommer was unveiled. This monument was funded by people's money collection. A second identical monument was set in Mouzon, in the French Ardennes, the village where Sommer was born.

The following year, on June 2, 1952, Juan Manuel Fangio came to Cadours to honor his late friend, in the name of the Argentine people.

In 1955, most of the race car events were cancelled because of the Le Mans accident. Drastic safety measures were specified. Most would require too expensive investment. At this time several events stopped; it became the beginning of the end of the "Circuit de Cadours-Laréole" as for several other in France and in Europe.

In 1957, a sports car category event was organised. It was won by André Loens who shortly afterward died in a Monthléry accident.

In 1958, Keith Campbell, world 350 cc champion, was leading the 500 cc race when he failed to round a bend known as Cox's Corner, crashed, and was killed instantly. According to a newspaper report, in trials he had beaten all records for the circuit, lapping at 71.5 miles an hour.

The two last events were in the Formula Junior category, held in 1959 and 1961. The last racing event was won by Jo Siffert who became a Swiss celebrity.

Every two years since 1998, the event is organized to gather owners and fans of oldtimers on a race track organised for this purpose.

== Results ==
Date	Category	Event	Pos	Driver	Team	Car	Laps	Lap length
18/09/1948		Accélération et Freinage de Cadours	1	René Mauriès		Simca-Gordini		4015 m
18/08/1949	Formula 2	1st Grand Prix de Cadours	1	Robert Gerbout		Gerbout Spéciale - Lombard		
10/09/1950	Formula 2	2nd Grand Prix de Cadours	1	Johnny/René Simone, alias René Abbo	Automobiles Deutsch et Bonnet	DB - Panhard	20	4015 m
			2	Aldo Gordini	Équipe Gordini	Simca-Gordini T15	20	
			3	Marcel Balsa	Marcel Balsa	Jicey - BMW	20	
				Raymond Sommer fatal crash				
10/9/1951	Formula 2	3rd Grand Prix de Cadours	1	Maurice Trintignant	Équipe Gordini	Simca-Gordini T15	25	4104 m
			2	Robert Manzon	Équipe Gordini	Simca-Gordini T15	25	
			3	Jean Behra	Équipe Gordini	Simca-Gordini T11	25	
14/9/1952	Formula 2	4th Grand Prix de Cadours	1	Louis Rosier	Louis Rosier	Ferrari 500	30	5536 m
			2	Harry Schell	Equipe Gordini	Simca-Gordini T16	30	
			3	Emmanuel de Graffenried	Enrico Platé	Maserati-Platé 4CLT/48	30	
30/8/1953	Formula 2	5th Grand Prix de Cadours	1	Maurice Trintignant	Équipe Gordini	Simca-Gordini T16	30	5536 m
			2	Harry Schell	Équipe Gordini	Simca-Gordini T16	30	
			3	Jean Behra	Équipe Gordini	Simca-Gordini T16	30	
30/8/1954	Non Champ.	6th Circuit de Cadours	1	Jean Behra	Équipe Gordini	Simca-Gordini T16	30	4000 m
			2	André Pilette	Équipe Gordini	Simca-Gordini T16	30	
			3	Louis Rosier	Louis Rosier	Maserati 250F	30	
8/9/1957	Sports	8th Circuit de Cadours	1	André Loens	Private	Maserati 200S	70	4000 m
			2	Carel Godin de Beaufort	Private	Porsche Spyder 550	70	
			3	Claude Storez	Private	Porsche Spyder 550	70	
6/9/1959	Formula Junior	10th Grand Prix de Cadours	1	Bill de Selincourt	Private	Elva 100 - BMC	30	3915 m
			2	Michel May	Private	Stanguellini - Fiat	30	
			3	Giovanni Alberti	Scuderia Madunina	Stanguellini - Fiat	30	
3/9/1961	Formula Junior	12th Grand Prix de Cadours	1	Jo Siffert	Écurie Romande	Lotus 20 - Ford	20	3915 m
			2	José Rosinski	Inter Auto Course	Cooper T56 - BMC	20	
			3	Philippe Martel	Private	Lotus 20 - Ford	20	
