= Cadours =

- Commune
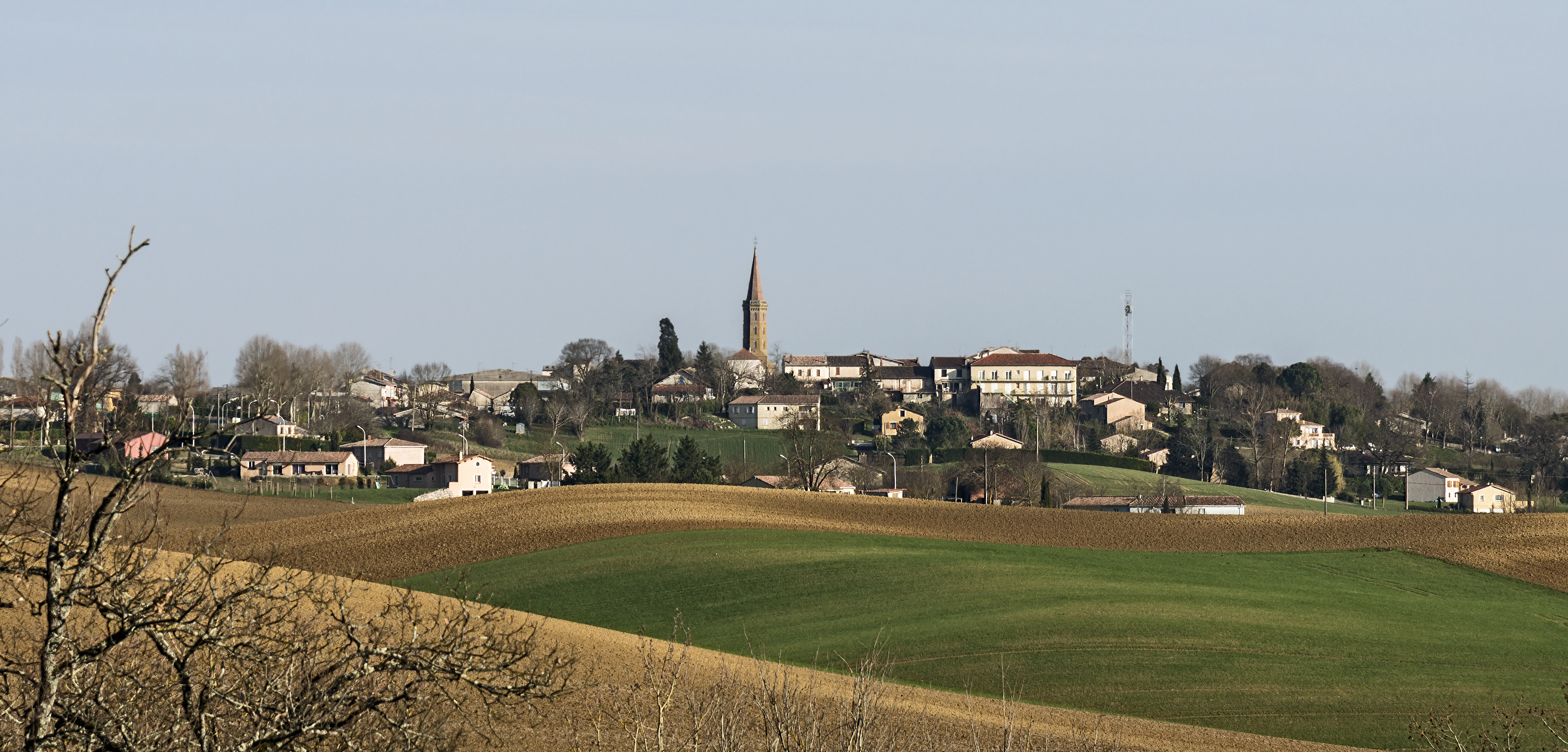
- Cadours

- Coat of arms
- Location of Cadours
- Location within France Location within Occitanie
- Coordinates: 43°43′45″N 1°03′02″E
- Country: France
- Region: Occitania
- Department: Haute-Garonne
- Arrondissement: Toulouse
- Canton: Léguevin
- Intercommunality: Hauts Tolosans

Government
  - Mayor (2020–2026): Didier Laffont
- Area^{1}: 10.58 km^{2} (4.08 sq mi)
- Elevation: 250 m (820 ft)
- Highest elevation: 242 m (794 ft)
- Lowest elevation: 147 m (482 ft)
- Population (2023): 1,142
  - Density: 107.9/km^{2} (279.6/sq mi)
- Time zone: UTC+01:00 (CET)
  - Summer (DST): UTC+02:00 (CEST)
- INSEE/Postal code: 31098 /31480
- ^{1} French Land Register data, which excludes lakes, ponds, glaciers > 1 km^{2} (0.386 sq mi or 247 acres) and river estuaries.

Cadours (French pronunciation: [kaduʁ]; Occitan: Cadors) is a commune in the Haute-Garonne department in southwestern France. The town hosted the Circuit de Cadours between 1948 and 1961.

== Population ==
Historical population
Year	Pop.	±% p.a.
1968	737	—
1975	776	+0.74%
1982	687	−1.73%
1990	694	+0.13%
1999	696	+0.03%
2007	1,047	+5.24%
2012	1,086	+0.73%
2017	1,086	+0.00%
2023	1,142	+0.84%
Source: INSEE

== Monuments ==
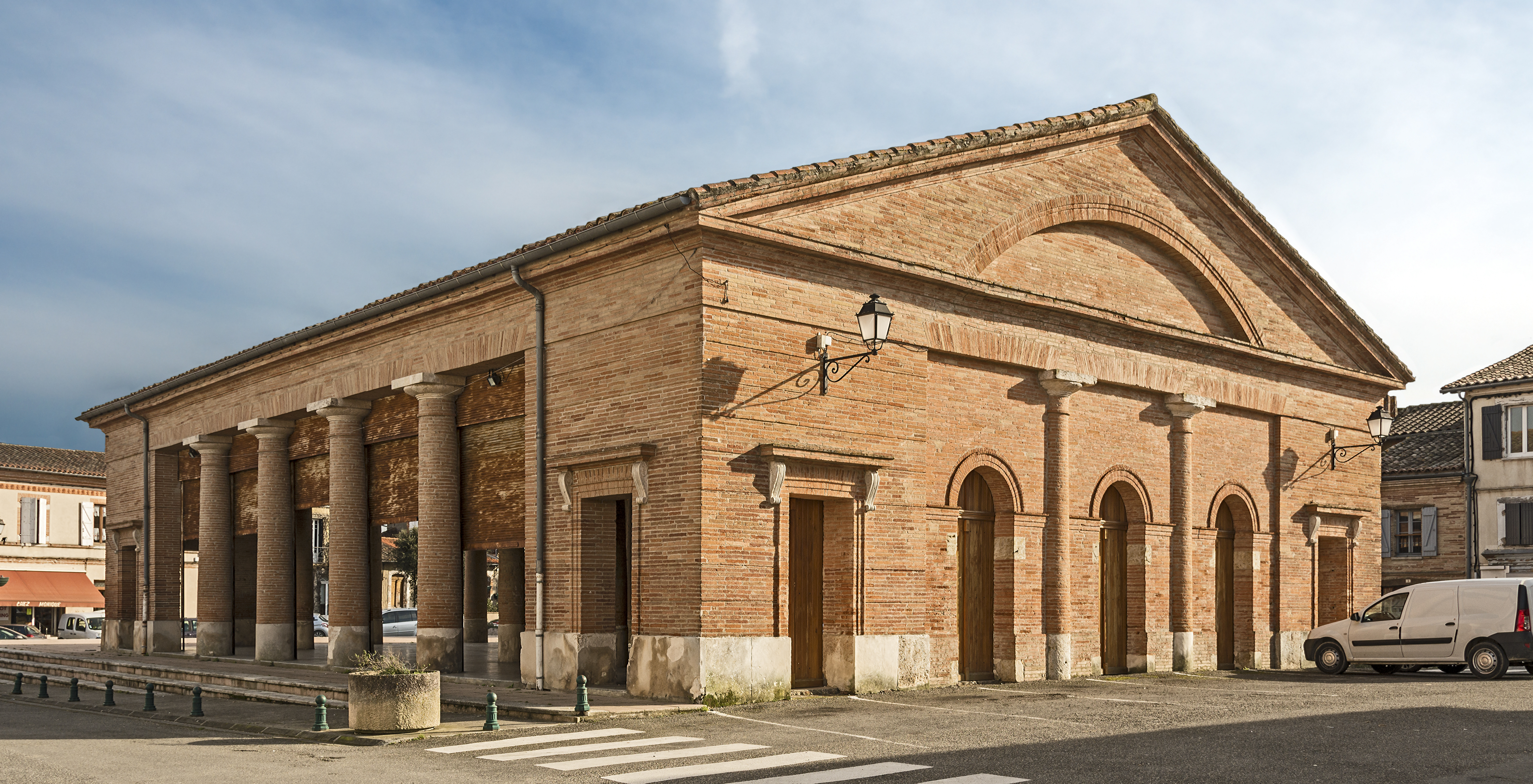
Market hall.

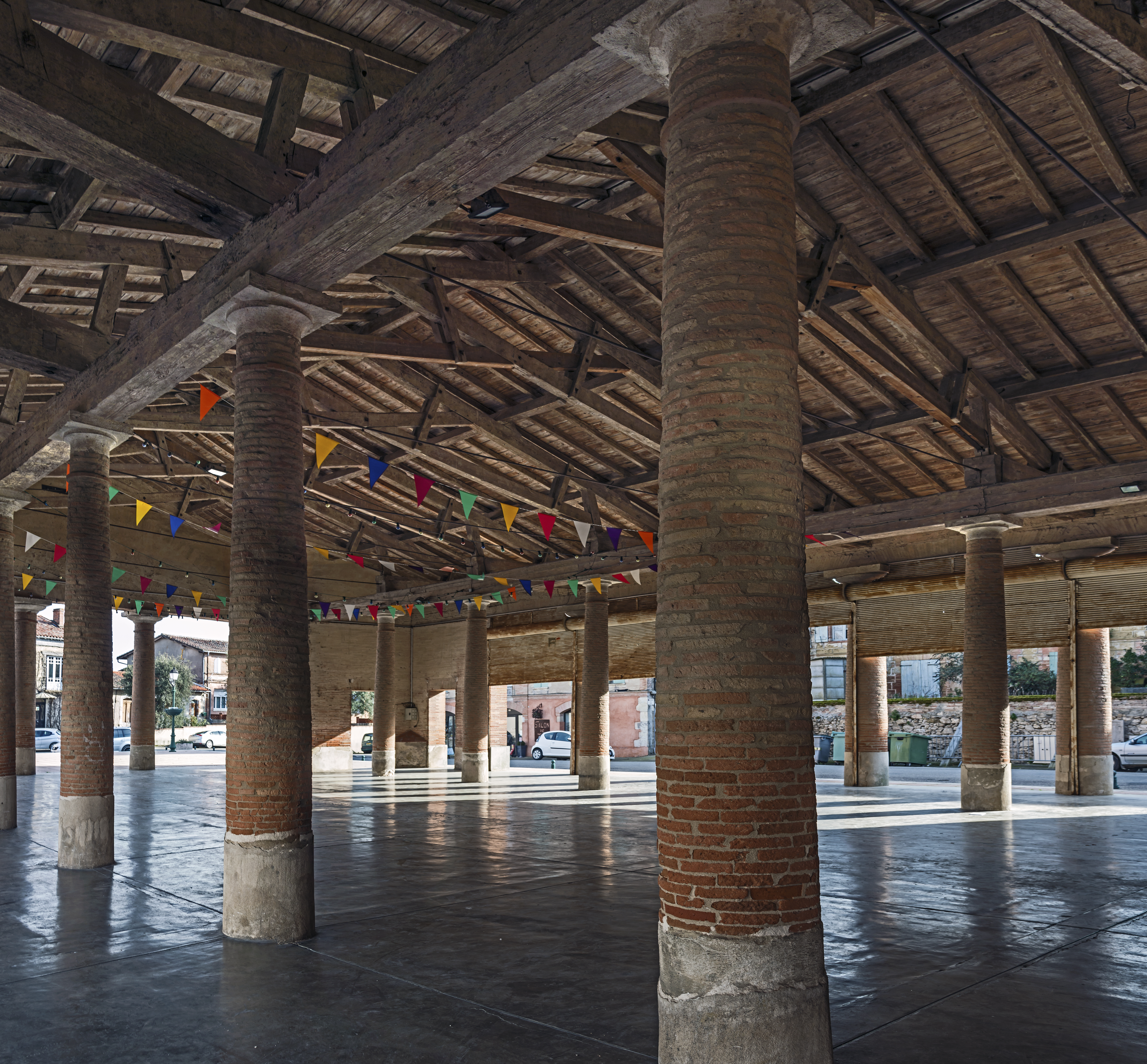
Inside the market hall.

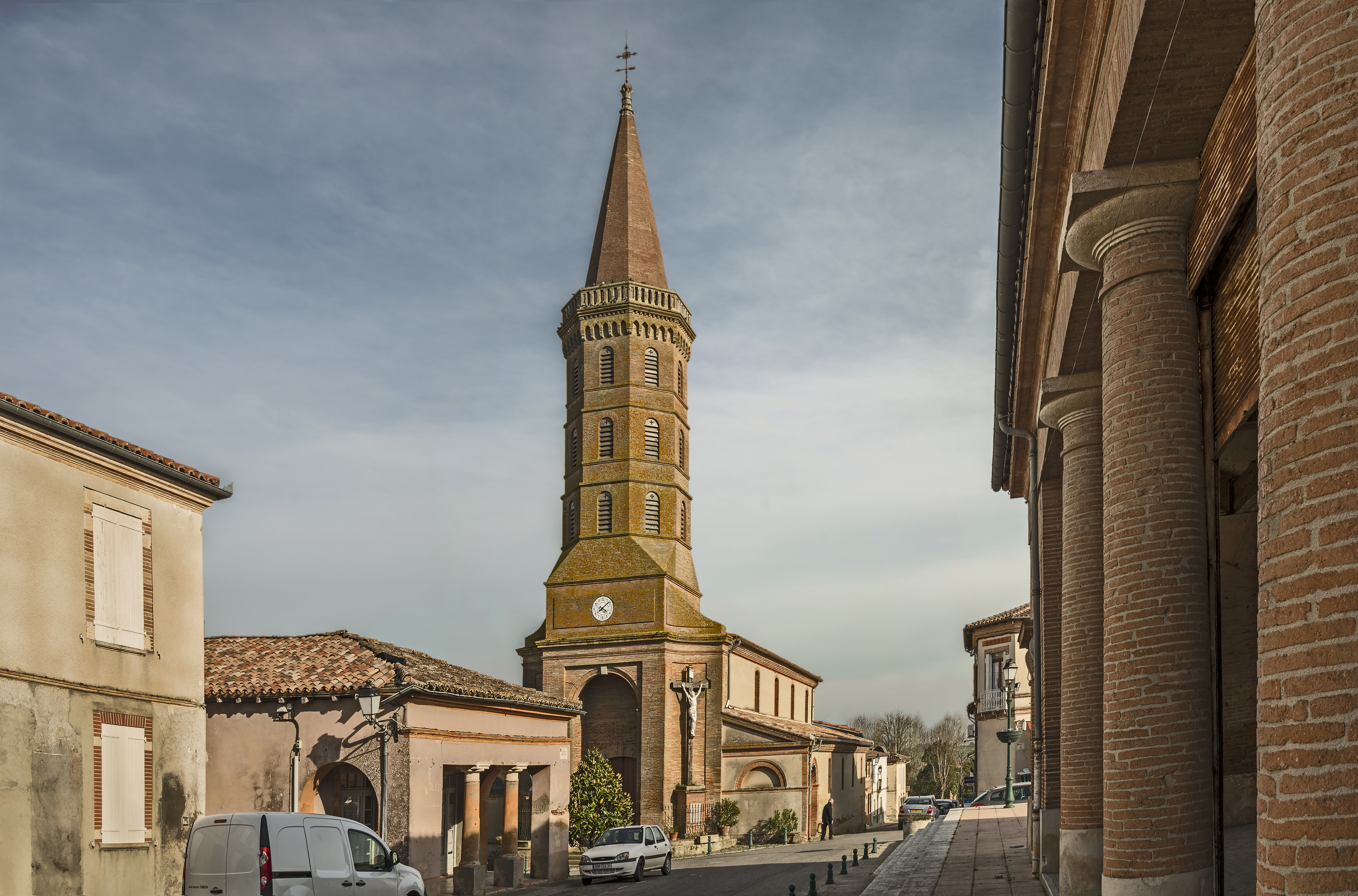
The church.

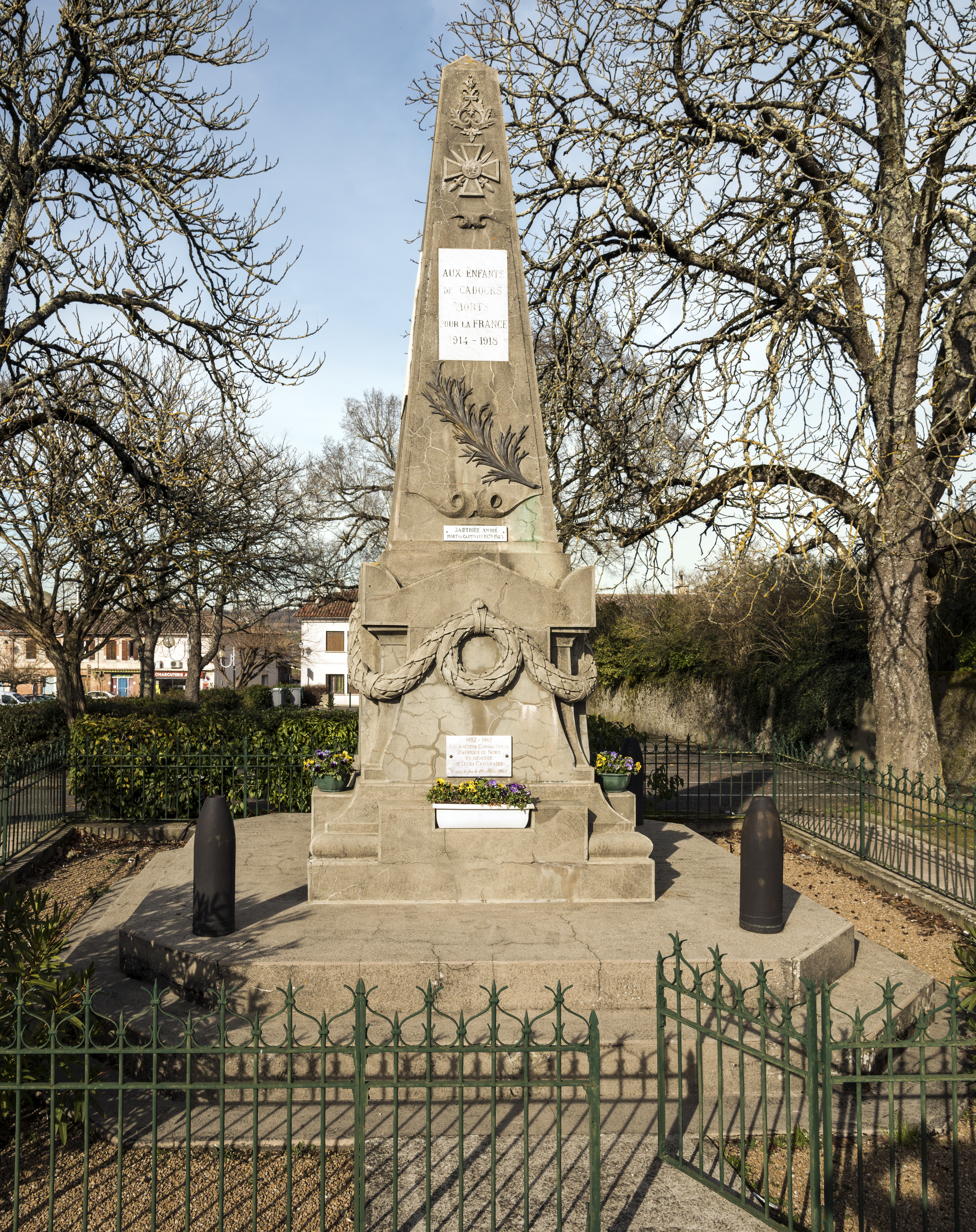
The War Memorial.

== See also ==
- Communes of the Haute-Garonne department
