= 1953 Snetterton Coronation Trophy =

Race details
- Date: 30 May 1953
- Official name: I Snetterton Coronation Trophy
- Location: Snetterton Circuit, Norfolk
- Course: Permanent racing facility
- Course length: 4.362 km (2.710 mi)
- Distance: 10 laps, 43.616 km (27.102 mi)

Pole position
Driver	(United Kingdom) Alan Brown	Cooper-Bristol

Fastest lap
Driver	(United Kingdom) Tony Rolt	Connaught-Lea Francis
- Time: 1:51.6

Podium
First	(United Kingdom) Tony Rolt	Connaught-Lea Francis
Second	(United Kingdom) Alan Brown	Cooper-Bristol
Third	(United Kingdom) Bobbie Baird	Ferrari

The 1st Snetterton Coronation Trophy was a Formula Two motor race held on 30 May 1953 at Snetterton Circuit, Norfolk. The race was run over 10 laps, and was won by British driver Tony Rolt in a Connaught Type A-Lea Francis. Rolt also set fastest lap. Alan Brown in a Cooper T23-Bristol was second and Bobbie Baird in a Ferrari 500 was third.

== Results ==
Pos.	No.	Driver	Entrant	Car	Time/Ret.
1	4	(United Kingdom) Tony Rolt	R.R.C. Walker Racing Team	Connaught Type A-Lea Francis	18:55.8, 137.74kph
2	66	(United Kingdom) Alan Brown	Equipe Anglaise	Cooper T23-Bristol	+10.0s
3	8	(United Kingdom) Bobbie Baird	Bobbie Baird	Ferrari 500	+16.6s
4	84	(United Kingdom) Rodney Nuckey	Rodney Nuckey	Cooper T23-Bristol	+18.8s
5	2	(United Kingdom) Ian Stewart	Ecurie Ecosse	Connaught Type A-Lea Francis	+1 lap
6	5	(United Kingdom) Bill Black	Bill Black	Frazer Nash Le Mans Replica	+1 lap
Ret	3	(United Kingdom) Jimmy Stewart	Ecurie Ecosse	Cooper T20-Bristol	7 laps, front axle
Ret	39	(United Kingdom) Roy Salvadori	S. Greene	Frazer Nash-Bristol	4 laps
Ret	7	(Republic of Ireland) Torrie Large	Bobbie Baird	Alta F2	4 laps, gearbox
Ret	69	(United Kingdom) Ben Wyatt	Ben Wyatt	Frazer Nash FN48	4 laps, accident
DNA	37	(United Kingdom) Cliff Davis	Cliff Davis	Tojeiro-Frazer Nash	
DNA	62	(United Kingdom) Horace Richards	H.A. Richards	H.A.R.-Riley	
DNA	82	(United Kingdom) Leslie Marr	Leslie Marr	Connaught Type A-Lea Francis	
DNA	83	(United Kingdom) Paul Emery	Emeryson Cars	Emeryson-Alta	
DNA	87	(United Kingdom) John Lyons	W. Knight	Connaught Type A-Lea Francis	

Previous race: 1953 Coronation Trophy	Formula One non-championship races 1953 season	Next race: 1953 Eifelrennen
Previous race: —	Snetterton Coronation Trophy	Next race: —
