= Bueb =

Bueb is a surname. Notable people with this surname include:

- Franz Bueb (1912–1982), German painter
- Ivor Bueb (1923–1959), British driver
