= Ron Flockhart (racing driver) =

British racing driver (1923–1962)

- Born: William Ronald Flockhart; 16 June 1923; Edinburgh, Scotland, UK
- Died: 12 April 1962 (aged 38); Kallista, Victoria, Australia

Formula One World Championship career
- Nationality: (United Kingdom) British
- Active years: 1954, 1956–1960
- Team(s): Maserati, BRM, Connaught, Cooper, Lotus
- Entries: 14 (13 starts)
- Championships: 0
- Wins: 0
- Podiums: 1
- Career points: 5
- Pole positions: 0
- Fastest laps: 0
- First entry: 1954 British Grand Prix
- Last entry: 1960 United States Grand Prix

William Ronald Flockhart (16 June 1923 – 12 April 1962) was a British racing driver. He participated in 14 World Championship Formula One Grands Prix, achieving one podium finish and won the 24 Hours of Le Mans sportscar race twice.

== Racing career ==
Flockhart started competing in 1951 in a JP Formula 3 car. He purchased the famous ERA R4D from Raymond Mays and in 1953 had a very successful season, beating one of the works BRMs at Goodwood. He achieved podium finishes at Goodwood, Charterhall, Snetterton and Crystal Palace, as well as several hill climb successes.

Flockhart's best World Championship result was third place at the 1956 Italian Grand Prix in a Connaught Type B. In 1959, driving a BRM P25, he won the Lady Wigram Trophy, and qualified on pole, set fastest lap and won the non-championship Silver City Trophy.

In 1956, driving for the Scottish team Ecurie Ecosse, Flockhart won the 1956 24 Hours of Le Mans, sharing an ex-works Jaguar D-type with Ninian Sanderson. The following year he won again for the same team, this time sharing with Ivor Bueb, setting a distance record of 2,732.8 mi (4,398.0 km).

== Record flight attempts and death ==
In the early 1960s, the United Dominions Trust made plans to break the record for the time taken to fly from Sydney to London in order to gain publicity for its UDT Laystall racing team. A Commonwealth Aircraft Corporation-built Mustang World War Two fighter was purchased in Australia and Flockhart was engaged to make the attempt. Flockhart departed Sydney in the Mustang, registered G-ARKD, on 28 February 1961 and after several delays due to bad weather finally ended the attempt at Athens due to engine problems. Flockhart subsequently entered the London-Cardiff Air Race to be held in June that year but withdrew because G-ARKD was still in Athens. G-ARKD was abandoned and another CAC Mustang, registered VH-UWB, was bought in Australia for Flockhart to make a second attempt at the Sydney-London record. On 12 April 1962, while on a test flight in preparation for the record attempt, Flockhart crashed VH-UWB in poor weather near Kallista, Victoria, and was killed.

== Racing record ==
=== Complete Formula One World Championship results ===
(key) (Races in bold indicate pole position; races in italics indicate fastest lap)

Year	Entrant	Chassis	Engine	1	2	3	4	5	6	7	8	9	10	11	WDC	Pts
1954	Prince Bira	Maserati 250F	Maserati 250F1 2.5 L6	ARG	500	BEL	FRA	GBR; Ret*	GER	SUI	ITA	ESP			NC	0
1956	Owen Racing Organisation	BRM P25	BRM P25 2.5 L4	ARG	MON	500	BEL	FRA	GBR; Ret	GER					14th	4
1956	Connaught Engineering	Connaught B	Alta GP 2.5 L4								ITA; 3				14th	4
1957	Owen Racing Organisation	BRM P25	BRM P25 2.5 L4	ARG	MON; Ret	500	FRA; Ret	GBR	GER	PES	ITA				NC	0
1958	R.R.C. Walker Racing Team	Cooper T43	Climax FPF 2.0 L4	ARG	MON; DNQ	NED	500	BEL	FRA	GBR	GER	POR	ITA		NC	0
1958	Owen Racing Organisation	BRM P25	BRM P25 2.5 L4											MOR; Ret	NC	0
1959	Owen Racing Organisation	BRM P25	BRM P25 2.5 L4	MON; Ret	500	NED	FRA; 6	GBR; Ret	GER	POR; 7	ITA; 13	USA			NC	0
1960	Team Lotus	Lotus 18	Climax FPF 2.5 L4	ARG	MON	500	NED	BEL	FRA; 6	GBR	POR	ITA			25th	1
1960	Cooper Car Company	Cooper T51	Climax FPF 2.5 L4										USA; Ret		25th	1

* Shared drive with Prince Bira

=== Complete 24 Hours of Le Mans results ===
Year	Team	Co-Drivers	Car	Class	Laps	Pos.	Class Pos.
1955	(United Kingdom) Lotus Engineering	(United Kingdom) Colin Chapman	Lotus Mark IX	S1.1	99	DNF (Reversed on track)	
1956	(United Kingdom) Ecurie Ecosse	(United Kingdom) Ninian Sanderson	Jaguar D-Type	S5.0	300	**1st**	**1st**
1957	(United Kingdom) Ecurie Ecosse	(United Kingdom) Ivor Bueb	Jaguar D-Type	S5.0	327	**1st**	**1st**
1959	(United Kingdom) Ecurie Ecosse	(United Kingdom) John ‘Jock’ Lawrence	Tojeiro	S3.0	137	DNF (Overheating)	
1960	(United Kingdom) Ecurie Ecosse	(United Kingdom) Bruce Halford	Jaguar D-Type	S3.0	168	DNF (Crankshaft)	
1961	(United Kingdom) Border Reivers	(United Kingdom) Jim Clark	Aston Martin DBR1/300	S3.0	132	DNF (Clutch)	

=== Complete 12 Hours of Sebring results ===
Year	Team	Co-Drivers	Car	Class	Laps	Pos.	Class Pos.
1958	(United Kingdom) Ecurie Ecosse	(United States) Masten Gregory	Jaguar D-Type	S3.0	55	DNF (Engine)	

Sporting positions
Preceded by Mike Hawthorn; Ivor Bueb	Winner of the 24 Hours of Le Mans; 1956-1957; With: Ninian Sanderson (1956) & Ivor Bueb (1957)	Succeeded by Olivier Gendebien; Phil Hill
