= Joe Potts =

Joe Potts was a British racing driver, turned racing car manufacturer, of the 1950s. He designed and constructed his 'JP' racing cars for the Formula 3 and Formule Libre racing classes. These are among the few single-seater racing cars to have been manufactured in Scotland, and predate the Fisher, Jasag, Raptor and Rotor models.

== Background ==
In the late 19th century an Irish immigrant, Joseph Potts, settled in Bellshill, Lanarkshire, and founded the company that bears his name. Amongst other lines of business he hired out horse-drawn carriages, one of his customers being a local undertaker. Potts was later to take over this funeral director's business, and modify his carriages so that they could be used as a hearse when necessary.

Potts' grandson – also Joseph, or Joe – is the subject of this article. He expanded the business's engineering offshoot in the mid-1930s, first by supplying motorcycle components and then, with the Second World War, by producing specialist armament parts. After the war, the funeral directorship and engineering works continued side-by-side. Joe Potts continued to develop motorbikes, running a highly successful team of racers, and then started to compete in races and hill climbs in his Cooper F3 car.

Believing the Cooper could be bettered, he and his chief designer Willie Rogerson set about designing and building their own 'JP' F3 cars in 1950. The precise number built over the next five years is not certain, but they are thought to number around 34. The company continued to undertake engineering projects until Joe's death in 1982.

== 'JP' drivers ==
Drivers who competed in Joe Potts' JP cars include:

- Mirrlees Chassells
- Ron Flockhart
- Ninian Sanderson
- David Swan
- Marshall Watson (father of Grand Prix driver John Watson)
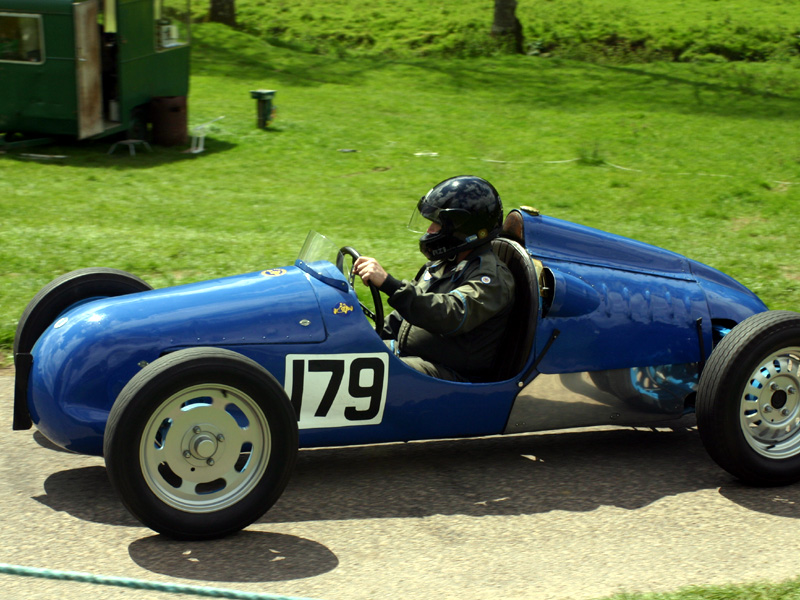
JP F3 car (in 2005)

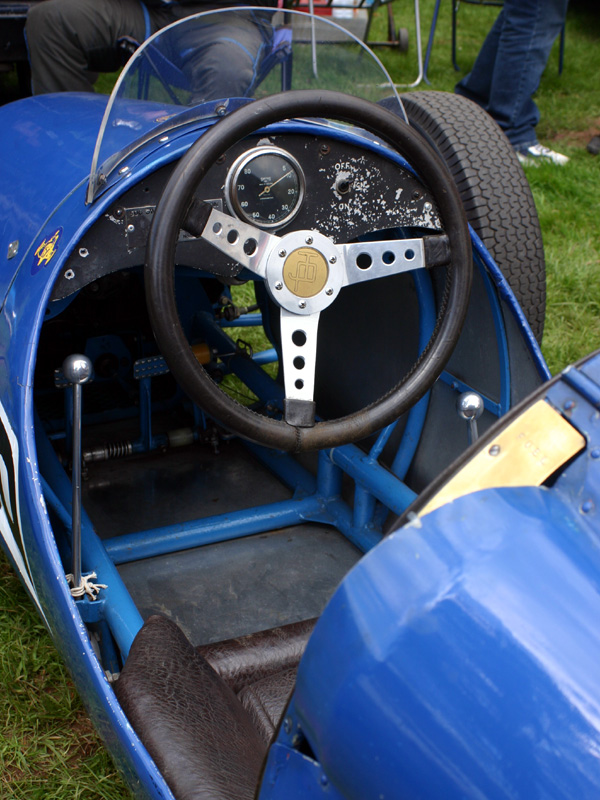
JP cockpit

== Bibliography ==
- Gauld, Graham: Scottish Motor Racing and Drivers (Havelock Publishing, Edinburgh, ISBN 978-0-9549167-0-1)
