= Tojeiro EE =

Sports racing car

Tojeiro Ecurie Ecosse
- Category: Sports car
- Constructor: Tojeiro
- Designer: John Tojeiro

Technical specifications
- Chassis: Steel-reinforced tubular space frame covered in aluminium panels
- Suspension: Double wishbones, coil springs over dampers, anti-roll bar (front); De Dion axle, Watt linkage (rear)
- Axle track: Front: 50.5 in (1,280 mm); Rear: 51.5 in (1,310 mm)
- Wheelbase: 89.5 in (2,270 mm)
- Engine: Mid-engine, longitudinally mounted, 2.5 L (153 cu in), Coventry Climax DOHC I4, NA; Mid-engine, longitudinally mounted, 3.5 L (214 cu in), Buick OHV V8, NA; Mid-engine, longitudinally mounted, 4.7 L (287 cu in), Ford OHV V8, NA
- Transmission: 4-speed manual
- Weight: 865 kg (1,907 lb)

Competition history
- Notable entrants: Ecurie Ecosse

The Tojeiro Ecurie Ecosse is a sports racing car, designed, developed and built by British designer John Tojeiro, and raced by the Scottish racing team Ecurie Ecosse, between 1958 and 1963.

== Background ==
Ecurie Ecosse had successfully campaigned the Jaguar D-Type at the 24 Hours of Le Mans, with overall wins in 1956 and 1957. Regulation changes introduced for 1958, notably a 3-litre cap on engine size, had rendered the D-Types uncompetitive. Ecurie Ecosse therefore commissioned John Tojeiro to build a mid-engined coupe along the lines of the Cooper T57 which the team were currently campaigning.

== Design ==
Tojeiro had developed their own mid-engined Formula Junior car with a spaceframe chassis. This was used as a basis for the new coupe. The 2.5 litre Climax FPF engine from the Cooper would provide the motive power. Eventually this was replaced with a Buick V8. At the same time a second chassis was built, also with the Buick engine. This chassis is often referred to as EE2. In its final iteration a 4.7 litre Ford V8 was fitted to one of the chassis; this was later cut down to an open cockpit configuration.

== Competition history ==
The first completed car was despatched to Le Mans, still unpainted and with the mechanics working on the car inside the transporter en route to the race. Driven by Jack Fairman and Tom Dickson, the car was running as high as second in its class, but retired after nine hours with gearbox failure.
