= 1956 24 Hours of Le Mans =

24th 24 Hours of Le Mans endurance race

Previous: 1955	Next: 1957
Index: Races | Winners

The 1956 24 Hours of Le Mans was a race for Sports Cars which took place on 28 and 29 July 1956 on the Circuit de la Sarthe. The race was won by Ron Flockhart and Ninian Sanderson driving a Jaguar D-Type for the new Ecurie Ecosse team. This race also marked the golden jubilee of the Automobile Club de l'Ouest (ACO) founded in 1906, however because of the previous year's disaster, celebrations were deferred to 1957 to go along with the imminent 25th anniversary of the race.

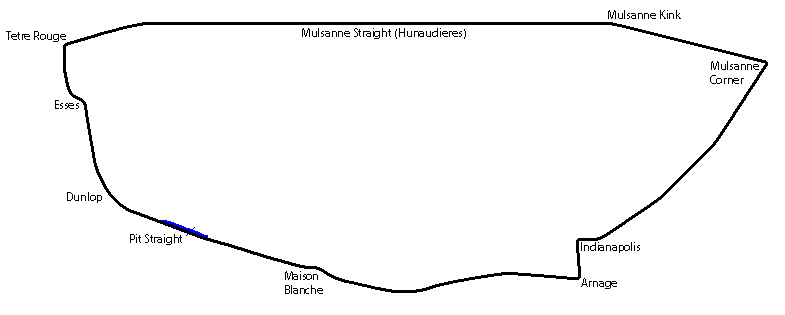
Le Mans in 1956

Following the events of 1955, the front stretch and pit lane were redesigned in order to enhance driver and spectator safety. This involved a change to the layout of the Dunlop curve, shortening the overall length of the track by 31 meters.

This race saw the death of French driver Louis Héry when his Monopole was involved in an accident early in the race.

== Regulations ==
The official enquiry into the 1955 Le Mans disaster found severe deficiencies in the track layout along the main straight and for quite some time there were serious concerns for the future of the race. However, the ACO took all the recommendations on board and was able to convince the French government for continuation. The extensive renovations cost FF300 million, moving 70000 cubic metres of earth and meant the race was delayed from June 9–10 to the end of July.

The pit straight was redesigned: it was widened by 13m (giving room for a deceleration lane), the small kink removed by straightening the approach, and the Dunlop curve realigned, steepened and eased, moving the Dunlop Bridge. This all had the effect of shortening the lap by 31 metres. The grandstand was demolished and rebuilt with new spectator terraces beyond a ditch between the track. The postwar pits were also torn down and a new 3-storey complex built giving more space for crews and with hospitality suites above (although there was still no barrier out to the racing line). This limited the number of starters to 52, down from 60.

Elsewhere on the track, the Indianapolis and Maison Blanche corners were also widened and resurfaced, and a dangerous hump on the road after Arnage was removed. A new “signalling pits” was built just after the Mulsanne corner (in the same place Bentley had used 20 years earlier with a phone-link back to the pits) so as to reduce crew congestion and driver distraction on the critical pit straight area.

Regarding new regulations, the ACO also set a number of new restrictions with a view to limit maximum speeds. Prototypes were now given a maximum engine size of 2.5L. Production cars had to have 50 units “built, sold or provided for” and were still unrestricted in engine capacity. These new limits put the ACO out of step with the FIA and hence the race was dropped from the 1956 World Sportscar Championship. Full-width windscreens, at least 200mm, high were also mandatory further trimming top-speed. Other effects to encourage economy limited all fuel tanks to a maximum size of 130 litres, and the liquids replenishment (fuel, oil, water) window was extended again, from 32 to 34 laps (458 km / 284 miles) meaning a minimum practical fuel economy of 10.8mpg would be needed. Finally, drivers were now only allowed to do 72 consecutive laps and 14 hours in total.

== Entries ==
Although Mercedes-Benz and Cunningham had withdrawn from racing, there was still strong support from the car manufacturers and 14 sent works-entries.

Category	Classes	Entries
Large-engines	S-5000 / S-3000	18
Medium-engines	S-2000 / S-1500	14
Small-engines	S-1100 / S-750	17

To some surprise, Jaguar and Aston Martin were able to present cases to the ACO that their current cars qualified as production models. Jaguar brought three of its updated D-types (now 130 kg lighter and up to 275 bhp), the lead car of Mike Hawthorn / Ivor Bueb equipped with fuel-injection. Their other drivers were the experienced Jack Fairman and Ken Wharton, and Paul Frère with new team-member Desmond Titterington. The team arrived in red-hot form after a comprehensive 1-2-3-4 result at the Reims 12-hour race. The reliable ally, Equipe Nationale Belge, fielded a new production D-Type. It also saw the arrival of Scotsman David Murray (racing driver)’s new Ecurie Ecosse under team manager Walter “Wilkie” Wilkinson. Murray's drivers were fellow-Scots Ron Flockhart and Ninian Sanderson, stepping up from the smaller classes. In the absence of the big Cunninghams and Talbots this year, the Jaguars had the S-5000 class to themselves.

Two true production cars, privately entered into the race, were a Jaguar XK140 and a gull-wing Mercedes-Benz 300SL.

Aston Martin returned with a pair of the DB3S, nominally production models but allowed non-standard components. Again, a strong driver line-up was represented, including Stirling Moss (now a works driver for Maserati, which was not at Le Mans this year) with Peter Collins and Roy Salvadori with Peter Walker. The team, having abandoned its Lagonda project, instead arrived with its own new 2.5L prototype – the DBR1/250. Its smaller engine still managed to produce virtually the same power (212 bhp) as its big brothers. It was driven by F1 drivers Reg Parnell and Tony Brooks

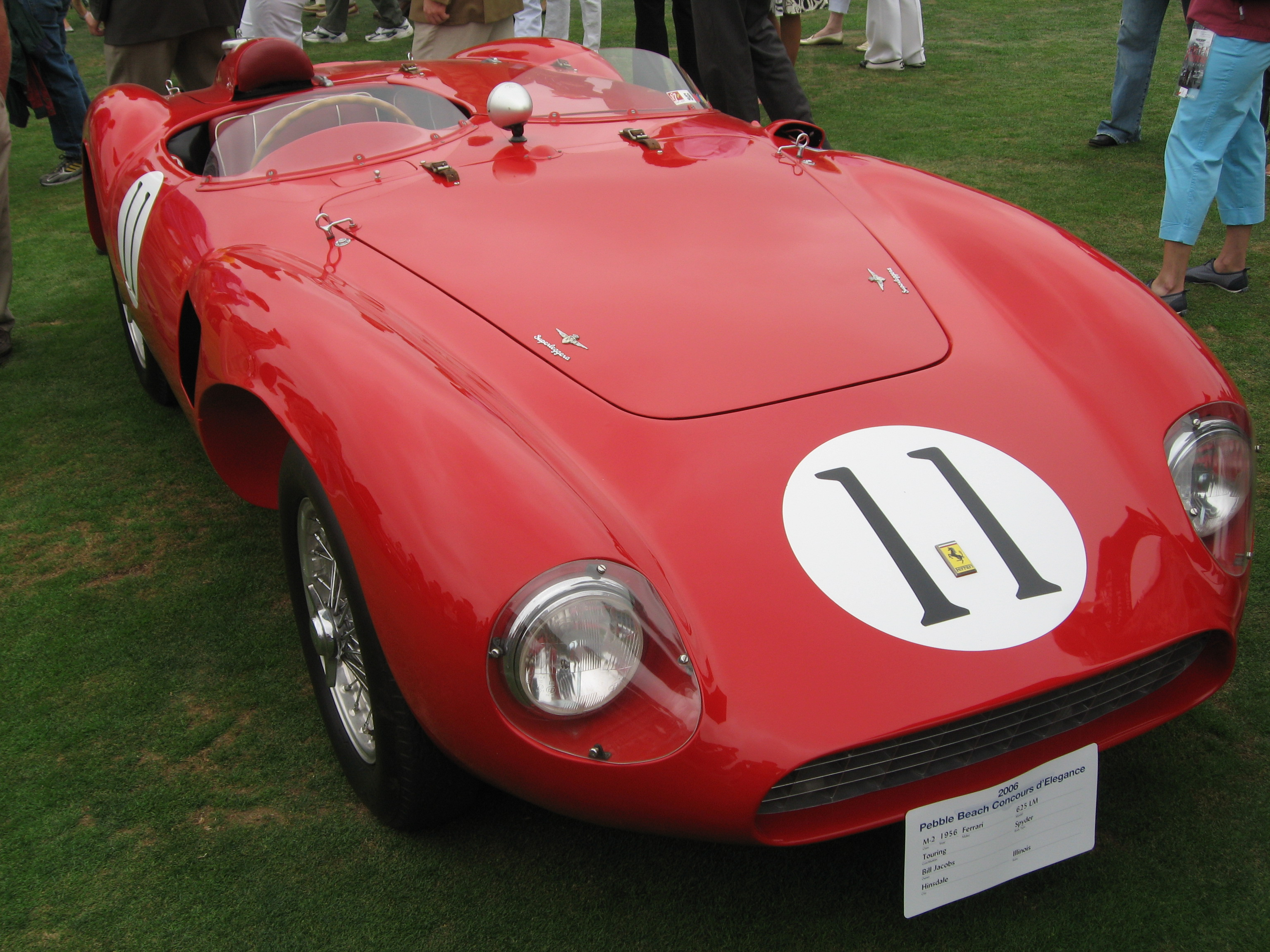
Ferrari 625 LM driven by de Portago and Hamilton.

Ferrari, without the production facilities to compete with the British, instead had to create a new 2.5L ‘prototype’ for, essentially, the one-off race at Le Mans. Engineer Vittorio Jano developed last year's 2.5L S-4 grand-prix engine and put it into a chassis adapted from the new 500 TR (the inaugural version of the “Testarossa”). Called the 625 LM, it gave 225 bhp giving a maximum speed of 230 km/h – 10 km/h slower than the Jaguars. Team drivers were race-winner Maurice Trintignant and Olivier Gendebien, Phil Hill and André Simon and Spanish noble 'Marquis' Alfonso de Portago with Duncan Hamilton (fired from Jaguar for ignoring team orders at the Rheims race once too often). Although the 2.0L V12 in the 500 TR was considered too weak by the factory to take on the Jaguars, there were three private-entries including a second car for the Equipe Nationale Belge.

Like Ferrari, French manufacturers Gordini and Talbot could not produce enough to meet the ACO requirements and therefore would have to enter their cars as prototypes. Gordini had two 2.5L cars and a smaller car in the S-1500 category. The larger cars trialled different engines: one using the 2.5L Straight-8 in the Grand Prix cars, and the other a new, more powerful, Straight-6 version (giving about 230 bhp). Talbot, now in receivership and in a change of tack, had adapted the 2.5L grand-prix engine from the Maserati 250F to their new sports cars. Two cars were entered for Jean Behra with Louis Rosier and Jean Lucas with pre-war Maserati veteran Geoffredo “Freddie” Zehender.

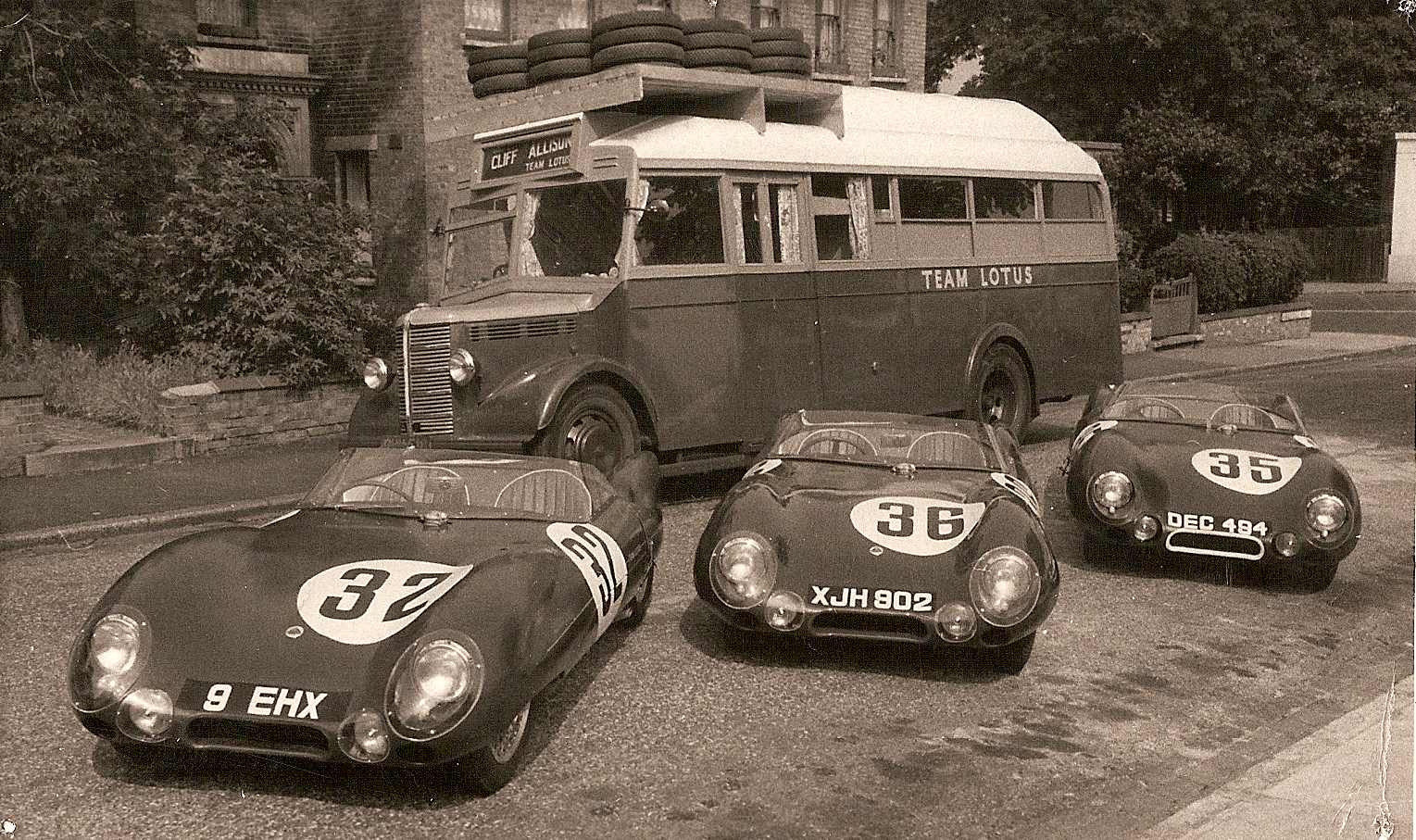
Three works Lotus 11 entries, in front of the team's race transporter.

After their great success in the previous race, Porsche returned in force with new cars: a pair of 550A Coupés and a 356 Carrera production model. The new car had famously recently beaten the bigger works Ferraris and Maseratis in the non-Championship Targa Florio. The factory also supported a further a pair of older, privately entered 550 RS spyders and a 356A. Competing in the S-1500 class were a pair of private Maseratis and Colin Chapman’s Lotus 11 with the new FWB-Climax engine. His two other cars still used the smaller 1098cc FWA-Climax engine. The other entrants in the S-1100 class were Cooper’s T39 using the same Climax engine, and a tiny French RB fitted with an OSCA 1093cc engine.

For once the smallest, S-750, class was not the preserve of the French. Italian manufacturers Stanguellini and Moretti both sent two-car entries, and OSCA a single car. They were up against a strong DB-works entry of four cars, and three Monopoles. Panhard had closed its racing department after the 1955 disaster and appointed Monopole, effectively as its works team.

Over the flying kilometre on the Mulsanne straight, the following top speeds this year were recorded this year:

Car	Engine	Horsepower	Maximum Speed
Jaguar D-Type	Jaguar 3.4L S6	285 bhp	156.8 mph (250.8 km/h)
Ferrari 625 LM	Ferrari 2.5L S4	225 bhp	144.7 mph (231.52 km/h)
Aston Martin DB3S	Aston Martin 2.9L S6	240 bhp	142.6 mph (228.16 km/h)
Gordini T15S	Gordini 2.5L S8	<230 bhp	142.4 mph (227.84 km/h)
Porsche 550A	Porsche 1.5L F4	135 bhp	138.0 mph (220.8 km/h)
Maserati 150S	Maserati 1.5L S4	125 bhp	129.5 mph (207.2 km/h)
Lotus 11 / Cooper T39	Climax FWA 1.1L S4	83 bhp	119.0 mph (190.4 km/h)
D.B. HBR-5	Panhard 747cc F2	-	109.2 mph (174.72 km/h)

== Practice ==
This year there were only the two practice sessions assigned – on the Wednesday and Thursday. Hawthorn set the fastest lap of 4:16.0 early on. Titterington was barely 3 seconds slower but then he demolished his car in an accident, forcing the team to prepare the spare car for the race. The best Moss could do in the Aston Martin was a 4:27 Meanwhile, the team was also finding the fuel consumption of their prototype DBR1, easily the noisiest car in the field, was excessive and therefore needed to trim it back to be able to get through the race. Most of the other larger cars were also doing checks on their fuel consumption for the new regulations, and having to adjust their engine settings accordingly

As a comparison, some of the lap-times recorded during practice were:

Car	Driver	Best Time
Jaguar D-Type	Hawthorn	4min 16sec
Aston Martin DB3S	Moss	4min 27sec
Ferrari 625 LM	de Portago	4min 28sec
Porsche 550A	von Trips	4min 40sec
Lotus 11 (1.5L)	Chapman	4min 46sec
Lotus 11 (1.1L)		5min 08sec
DB-Panhard HBR-5		5min 46sec

== Race ==
=== Start ===
A minute's silence was held before the start of the race for the previous year's victims and a commemorative plaque unveiled.

The race started in light drizzle, making the new track surface treacherously greasy. As usual, Moss was lightning-quick and first off the line in his Aston Martin. Hawthorn's more powerful Jaguar blasted past him on the back straight and led at the end of the first lap. On lap three, Paul Frère got it sideways in the narrow Esses and spun his Jaguar. Fairman, close behind in the sister car, slammed on the brakes and also spun, then de Portago arrived unsighted and with nowhere to go broadsided Fairman. All three cars got going again: Frère limped on but came to a halt on the Mulsanne straight. De Portago got a bit further but the Ferrari's oil cooler was smashed. Fairman got to the pits but the damage was too severe to repair. Ten minutes gone and three of the leading works entries were already eliminated. Hill's Ferrari barely managed to skate through his teammate's oil, but soon his clutch started to fail. More drama occurred minutes later when Hawthorn came in from the lead with an engine misfire. It was eventually traced to a hairline crack in a fuel line – the delay and repair cost an hour, and 21 laps, and dropped the remaining works Jaguar out of contention.

But worse had happened between these issues: Louis Héry, local garage owner in his second Le Mans, crashed his private Monopole-Panhard heavily at Maison Blanche. The car rolled and tore itself apart. Héry, critically injured, died in the ambulance en route to the hospital.

On lap 7, Flockhart used his superior speed to get his Ecosse Jaguar into the lead, but the veteran drivers Moss and Walker kept their Aston Martins in contact. After the first pit-stops and driver-changes Sanderson put the Ecosse Jaguar onto a more conservative race strategy and Collins took the lead in the 3rd hour as the rain got heavier. The two remaining works Ferraris moved up to 3rd and 4th when the Walker/Salvadori Aston was delayed by ignition problems. Yet again Gordini was quick and competitive – the T15 of Manzon and Guichet, with the 2.5L F1 engine, holding a solid 5th place, and its sister car a couple of places behind tussling with the Belgian Jaguar.

=== Night ===
Being run a month later, the night was that bit longer and intermittent showers persisted through the night. Just before 10pm on the run from Maison Blanche to the pits Fernand Tavano's Testarossa went off the road, spun and hit the bank. Facing the opposite direction, his headlights blinded ’Helm’ Glöckler whose Porsche Carrera ran straight into the Ferrari. Tavano was thrown clear by the heavy impact as his car was shoved into the roadside ditch, but the Porsche rolled and burst into flames. Glöckler was pulled out by rescuers with minor burns and a broken leg.

By midnight Sanderson had retaken the lead, yet as the track got damp again, the experience of the F1 racers showed and Moss & Collins retook the lead by 3am, with Gendebien/Trintignant third, four laps down. Hill/Simon running 4th, had been changing gears with no clutch until they were forced out with rear axle failure just before half-time. The remarkable Porsche 550s were running 5th and 6th. Near the end of the night though Maglioli's leading Porsche was slowed and eventually stopped by engine issues. The prototype Aston Martin was surprising many, running in the top-10, and by the early hours of the morning had climbed up to 4th. Sadly for the partisan crowd, both Gordinis had fallen by the wayside with engine problems. In the small hours Cliff Allison’s Lotus, doing 190 km/h, struck a dog chasing a rabbit on the Mulsanne Straight wrecking the radiator.

=== Morning ===
The rain stopped for a while around dawn and that suited the bigger Jaguar, and they retook the lead and by 8am had built a 3-minute margin. Soon after dawn the last of the 2-litre class was out – the Ferrari of Jean Lucas, having got into the top-10, was disqualified for refuelling two laps too early. Around 7.30, in a sudden downpour, Peter Walker, running 8th, crashed heavily at the Dunlop bridge just after the pits. The car rolled and sat in the middle of the road but the driver was able to get out with just cuts, bruises and a broken finger. Later in the morning Moss and Collins lost their 2nd gear, limiting their chase and they gradually gave up ground. Around noon the Talbot of Behra/Rosier was stopped by a broken rear axle. They had barely kept up with the Aston Martin, Ferraris and Gordinis in its class, but through attrition, had been able to move up to 8th by the time they retired.

=== Finish and post-race ===
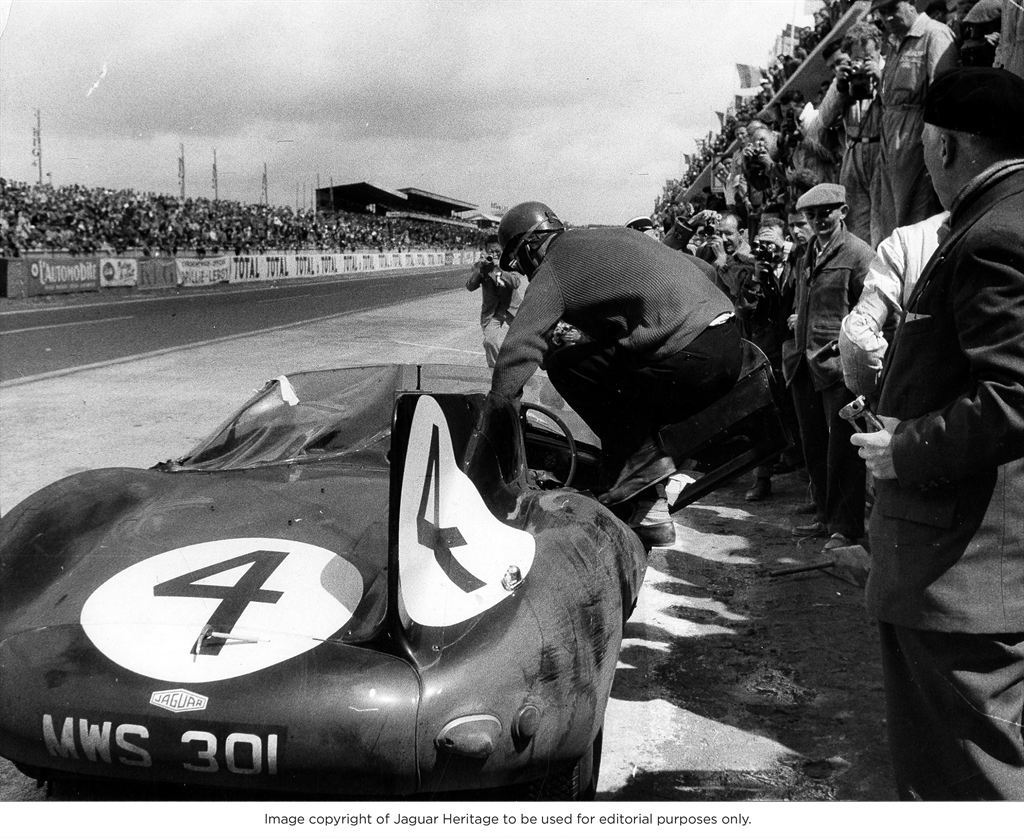
A driver entering the winning Jaguar D-Type during a pit stop.

The leading cars remained reliable and reached the finish, except the Aston Martin prototype which, having slipped to 7th with engine problems, broke its rear suspension in the final hour.

The Ecosse Jaguar won by a lap from the Aston Martin. The Ferraris were never able to compete with the leaders but Gendebien/Trintignant came home third a further six laps back. Yet again the Belgian Jaguar had a good run, this time finishing 4th, fully 16 laps behind the winner. The leading Porsche of von Trips and von Frankenberg was 5th, just missing out on the Index of Performance, but finishing an enormous 37 laps ahead of the only other class-finisher: the privateer Maserati of Bourillot/Perroud in 9th. Having been driving up from the back of the field for 23 hours, Hawthorn and Bueb finished a commendable 6th place, with Hawthorn's determination getting him the race's fastest lap, albeit well down on the previous year.

The rivalry between the Climax-engined kit-cars went the way of Lotus. Jopp and Bicknell had retaken the S-1100 lead around 11am after the Cooper of Americans Hugus and Bentley had held it for 12 hours, and finished just over a lap ahead with the cars finishing 7th and 8th overall. The DB works team did well again with three of their four cars finishing (in 10th, 11th and 12th overall), and taking the valuable Index of Performance prize

A mere 13 finishers were classified (the lowest ratio of the decade), and given the wet conditions it was no surprise that there were 16 major accidents. It was a credit to the preparation and organisation of the fledgling Ecurie Ecosse team to win on its first attempt at Le Mans.

Although not one of the event's most exciting races it was, nevertheless, a testament to the dedication and tradition of the ACO that it was able to overcome the disaster of the 1955 race. This was the final race overseen by Charles Faroux, engineer and journalist, who was the co-founder of the race; he died the following February aged 74. Closely involved in international motor-racing administration he was also the race director for the Monaco Grand Prix.

== Official results ==
Results taken from Quentin Spurring's book, officially licensed by the ACO

Pos	Class	No	Team	Drivers	Chassis	Engine	Laps
1	S 5.0	4	(United Kingdom) Ecurie Ecosse	(United Kingdom) Ninian Sanderson (United Kingdom) Ron Flockhart	Jaguar D-Type	Jaguar 3.4L S6	300
2	S 3.0	8	(United Kingdom) Aston Martin Ltd.	(United Kingdom) Stirling Moss (United Kingdom) Peter Collins	Aston Martin DB3S	Aston Martin 2.9L S6	299
3	S 3.0	12	(Italy) Scuderia Ferrari	(Belgium) Olivier Gendebien (France) Maurice Trintignant	Ferrari 625 LM	Ferrari 2.5L S4	293
4	S 5.0	5	(Belgium) Equipe Nationale Belge	(Belgium) Jacques Swaters (Belgium) Freddy Rousselle	Jaguar D-Type	Jaguar 3.4L S6	284
5	S 1.5	25	(West Germany) Porsche KG	(West Germany) Graf Wolfgang von Trips (West Germany) Richard von Frankenberg	Porsche 550A Coupe	Porsche 1498cc F4	282
6	S 5.0	1	(United Kingdom) Jaguar Cars Ltd.	(United Kingdom) Mike Hawthorn (United Kingdom) Ivor Bueb	Jaguar D-Type FI	Jaguar 3.4L S6	280
7	S 1.1	36	(United Kingdom) Lotus Engineering	(United Kingdom) Reg Bicknell (United Kingdom) Peter Jopp	Lotus 11	Climax FWA 1098cc S4	253
8	S 1.1	33	(United Kingdom) Cooper Car Company	(United States) Ed Hugus (United States) John Bentley	Cooper T39	Climax FWA 1098cc S4	252
9	S 1.5	30	(France) C. Bourillot (private entrant)	(France) Claude Bourillot (France) Henri Perroud	Maserati 150S	Maserati 1497cc S4	245
10	S 750	40	(France) Automobiles; Deutsch et Bonnet	(France) Gérard Laureau (France) Paul Armagnac	DB HBR-5 Spyder	Panhard 747cc F2	231
11	S 750	45	(France) Automobiles; Deutsch et Bonnet	(France) Jean-Claude Vidilles (France) Jean Thépenier	DB HBR-5 Coupé	Panhard 747cc F2	225
12	S 750	46	(France) Automobiles; Deutsch et Bonnet	(France) André Héchard (France) Roger Masson	DB HBR-4 Spyder	Panhard 747cc F2	220
N/C *	S 1.5	34	(West Germany) R. Bourel (private entrant)	(France) Roland Bourel (France) Maurice Slotine	Porsche 356A	Porsche 1290cc F4	212
13	S 1.1	41	(France) Just-Emile Vernet	(France) Jean-Marie Dumazer (France) Lucien Campion	VP 166R	Renault 845cc S4	210

- Note *: Not Classified because of Insufficient distance covered

== Did Not Finish ==
Pos	Class	No	Team	Drivers	Chassis	Engine	Laps	Reason
DNF	S 3.0	14	(United Kingdom) Aston Martin Ltd.	(United Kingdom) Reg Parnell (United Kingdom) Tony Brooks	Aston Martin DBR1/250	Aston Martin 2.5L S6	246	Transmission (24hr)
DNF	S 3.0	17	(France) Automobiles Talbot	(France) Jean Behra (France) Louis Rosier	Talbot-Lago Sport	Maserati 2.5L S6	220	Transmission (21hr)
DSQ	S 5.0	6	(United Kingdom) R. Walshaw (private entrant)	(United Kingdom) Robert Walshaw (United Kingdom) Peter Bolton	Jaguar XK140	Jaguar 3.5L S6	209	Premature Refuelling (21hr)
DNF	S 3.0	9	(United Kingdom) Aston Martin Ltd.	(United Kingdom) Peter Walker (United Kingdom) Roy Salvadori	Aston Martin DB3S	Aston Martin 2.9L S6	173	Accident (16hr)
DNF	S 1.5	32	(United Kingdom) Lotus Engineering	(United Kingdom) Colin Chapman (United States) Herbert MacKay-Fraser	Lotus 11	Climax FWB 1459cc S4	172	Engine (21hr)
DSQ	S 2.0	22	(France) Los Amigos	(France) François Picard (United States) Bob Tappan (United States) Howard Hively	Ferrari 500 TR	Ferrari 1985cc S4	137	Premature refuelling (14hr)
DNF	S 1.5	24	(West Germany) Porsche KG	(Italy) Umberto Maglioli (West Germany) Hans Herrmann	Porsche 550A Coupé	Porsche 1498cc F4	136	Engine (16hr)
DNF	S 1.1	37	(France) René Breuil	(France) Jean Py (France) Yves Dommée	RB Sport	OSCA 1093cc S4	116	Gearbox (15hr)
DNF	S 3.0	10	(Italy) Scuderia Ferrari	(United States) Phil Hill (France) André Simon	Ferrari 625 LM	Ferrari 2.5L S4	107	Transmission (10hr)
DNF	S 2.0	23	(United Kingdom) Automobiles Frazer Nash Ltd.	(United Kingdom) Richard ‘Dickie’ Stoop (Australia) Tony Gaze	Frazer Nash Sebring	Bristol 1977cc S6	100	Accident (10hr)
DNF	S 3.0	16	(France) Automobiles Gordini	(Brazil) Hermano da Silva Ramos (France) André de Guelfi	Gordini T23S	Gordini 2.5L S6	90	Clutch (12hr)
DNF	S 1.1	35	(United Kingdom) Lotus Engineering	(United Kingdom) Cliff Allison (United Kingdom) Keith Hall	Lotus 11	Climax FWA 1098cc S4	89	Accident (10hr)
DNF	S 3.0	15	(France) Automobiles Gordini	(France) Robert Manzon (France) Jean Guichet	Gordini T15S	Gordini 2.5L S8	80	Engine (8hr)
DNF	S 3.0	19	(France) J.-P. Colas (private entrant)	(France) Serge Nersessian (France) Georges Monneret	Salmson 2300S Coupé	Salmson 2.3L S4	80	Gearbox (10hr)
DNF	S 2.0	20	(Belgium) Equipe Nationale Belge	(Belgium) Lucien Bianchi (Belgium) Alain de Changy	Ferrari 500 TR	Ferrari 1985cc S4	76	Steering (8hr)
DNF	S 1.5	29	(France) Automobiles Gordini	(Belgium) André Milhoux (France) Clarence de Clareur	Gordini T17S	Gordini 1495cc S6	67	Out of fuel (8hr)
DNF	S 750	48	(Italy) Moretti Automobili	(France) Marcel Lauga (France) Jean-Michel Durif	Moretti 750 Gran Sport	Moretti 747cc S4	62	Engine (10hr)
DNF	S 2.0	21	(France) P. Meyrat (private entrant)	(France) Pierre Meyrat (France) Fernand Tavano	Ferrari 500 TR	Ferrari 1985cc S4	61	Accident (8hr)
DNF	S 1.5	26	(West Germany) Porsche KG	(West Germany) Max Nathan (West Germany) Helmut ‘Helm’ Glöckler	Porsche 356 Carrera	Porsche 1498cc F4	61	Accident (8hr)
DNF	S 3.0	7	(West Germany) P. Metternich	(West Germany) Fürst Paul von Metternich- Winneburg (West Germany) Wittigo von Einsiedel	Mercedes-Benz 300SL	Mercedes-Benz 3.0L S6	58	Engine (8hr)
DNF	S 750	49	(France) Automobiles Panhard	(France) Jean Hémard (France) Pierre Flahaut	Panhard-Monopole X89	Panhard 745cc F2	50	Engine (7hr)
DNF	S 1.5	27	(West Germany) W. Seidel (private entrant)	(Netherlands) Carel Godin de Beaufort (Netherlands) Mathieu Hezemans	Porsche 550 RS Spyder	Porsche 1498cc F4	48	Suspension (8hr)
DNF	S 750	50	(France) Automobiles Panhard	(France) Pierre Chancel (France) André Beaulieux	Panhard-Monopole X88	Panhard 745cc F2	46	Accident (6hr)
DNF	S 1.5	28	(France) G. Olivier (private entrant)	(France) Claude Storez (West Germany) Helmut Polensky	Porsche 550 RS Spyder	Porsche 1498cc F4	45	Electrics (8 hr)
DNF	S 750	52	(Italy) Automobili Stanguellini	(France) René-Philippe Faure (France) Gilbert Foury	Stanguellini 750 Sport	Stanguellini 741cc S4	36	Accident (6hr)
DNF	S 1.5	31	(France) L. Cornet (private entrant)	(France) Louis Cornet (France) Robert Mougin	Maserati 150S	Maserati 1487cc S4	35	Engine (4hr)
DNF	S 3.0	18	(France) Automobiles Talbot	(France) Jean Lucas (Italy) Geoffredo Zehender	Talbot-Lago Sport	Maserati 2.5L S6	32	Accident (7hr)
DNF	S 750	53	(Italy) Automobili Stanguellini	(France) Pierre Duval (France) Georges Guyot	Stanguellini 750 Sport	Stanguellini 741cc S4	23	Engine (4hr)
DNF	S 750	47	(Italy) Moretti Automobili	(France) Marceau Esculus (France) François Guillaud	Moretti 750 Gran Sport	Moretti 747cc S4	22	Electrics (7 hr)
DNF	S 750	51	(France) L. Héry (private entrant)	(France) Louis Héry (France) Lucien Pailler	Monopole X86	Panhard 745cc F2	5	Fatal accident (1 hr)
DNF	S 750	42	(Italy) Automobili O.S.C.A.	(France) Jean Laroche (France) Rémy Radix	O.S.C.A. 750 S	OSCA 749cc S4	4	Accident (1hr)
DNF	S 5.0	3	(United Kingdom) Jaguar Cars Ltd.	(United Kingdom) Jack Fairman (United Kingdom) Ken Wharton	Jaguar D-Type	Jaguar 3.4L S6	3	Accident (1hr)
DNF	S 750	44	(France) Automobiles; Deutsch et Bonnet	(France) Fernand Carpentier (France) Pierre Savary	DB HBR-5 Coupé	Panhard 747cc F2	2	Accident (1hr)
DNF	S 3.0	11	(Italy) Scuderia Ferrari	(Spain) Alfonso, Marquis de Portago (United Kingdom) Duncan Hamilton	Ferrari 625 LM	Ferrari 2.5L I4	2	Accident (1hr)
DNF	S 5.0	2	(United Kingdom) Jaguar Cars Ltd.	(Belgium) Paul Frère (United Kingdom) Desmond Titterington	Jaguar D-Type	Jaguar 3.4L S6	2	Accident (1hr)

== Index of Performance ==
Pos	Class	No	Team	Drivers	Chassis	Score
1	S 750	40	(France) Automobiles; Deutsch et Bonnet	(France) Gérard Laureau (France) Paul Armagnac	DB HBR-5 Spyder	1.166
2	S 1.5	25	(West Germany) Porsche KG	(West Germany) Graf Wolfgang von Trips (West Germany) Richard von Frankenberg	Porsche 550A Coupe	1.159
3	S 750	45	(France) Automobiles; Deutsch et Bonnet	(France) Jean-Claude Vidilles (France) Jean Thépenier	DB HBR-5 Coupé	1.135
4	S 1.1	36	(United Kingdom) Lotus Engineering	(United Kingdom) Reg Bicknell (United Kingdom) Peter Jopp	Lotus 11	1.118
5	S 1.1	33	(United Kingdom) Cooper Car Company	(United States) Ed Hugus (United States) John Bentley	Cooper T39	1.114
6	S 3.0	8	(United Kingdom) Aston Martin Ltd.	(United Kingdom) Stirling Moss (United Kingdom) Peter Collins	Aston Martin DB3S	1.113
7	S 3.0	12	(Italy) Scuderia Ferrari	(Belgium) Olivier Gendebien (France) Maurice Trintignant	Ferrari 625 LM	1.110
8	S 750	46	(France) Automobiles; Deutsch et Bonnet	(France) André Héchard (France) Roger Masson	DB HBR-4 Spyder	1.110
9	S 5.0	4	(United Kingdom) Ecurie Ecosse	(United Kingdom) Ninian Sanderson (United Kingdom) Ron Flockhart	Jaguar D-Type	1.101
10	S 5.0	5	(Belgium) Equipe Nationale Belge	(Belgium) Jacques Swaters (Belgium) ‘Freddy’ Rousselle	Jaguar D-Type	1.041

- Note: Only the top ten positions are included in this set of standings. A score of 1.00 means meeting the minimum distance for the car, and a higher score is exceeding the nominal target distance.

== 22nd Rudge-Whitworth Biennial Cup (1955/1956) ==
Pos	Class	No	Team	Drivers	Chassis	Score
1	S 750	40	(France) Automobiles; Deutsch et Bonnet	(France) Gérard Laureau (France) Paul Armagnac	DB HBR-5 Spyder	1.166
2	S 1.5	25	(West Germany) Porsche KG	(West Germany) Graf Wolfgang von Trips (West Germany) Richard von Frankenberg	Porsche 550A Coupe	1.159
3	S 3.0	8	(United Kingdom) Aston Martin Ltd.	(United Kingdom) Stirling Moss (United Kingdom) Peter Collins	Aston Martin DB3S	1.113

- Note: Only the top three positions are included in this set of standings.

== Statistics ==
Taken from Quentin Spurring's book, officially licensed by the ACO

- Fastest Lap in practice – Hawthorn, #1 Jaguar D-Type – 4m 16.0s; 186.20 kp/h (117.56 mph)
- Fastest Lap – Hawthorn, #1 Jaguar D-Type – 4m 20.0s; 186.38 kp/h (115.82 mph)
- Distance - 4,034.93 km (2,507.19 mi)
- Winner's Average Speed - 168.12 km/h (104.46 mph)
- Attendance – 250 000

Citations
