= Ian Stewart (racing driver) =

British racing driver (1929–2017)

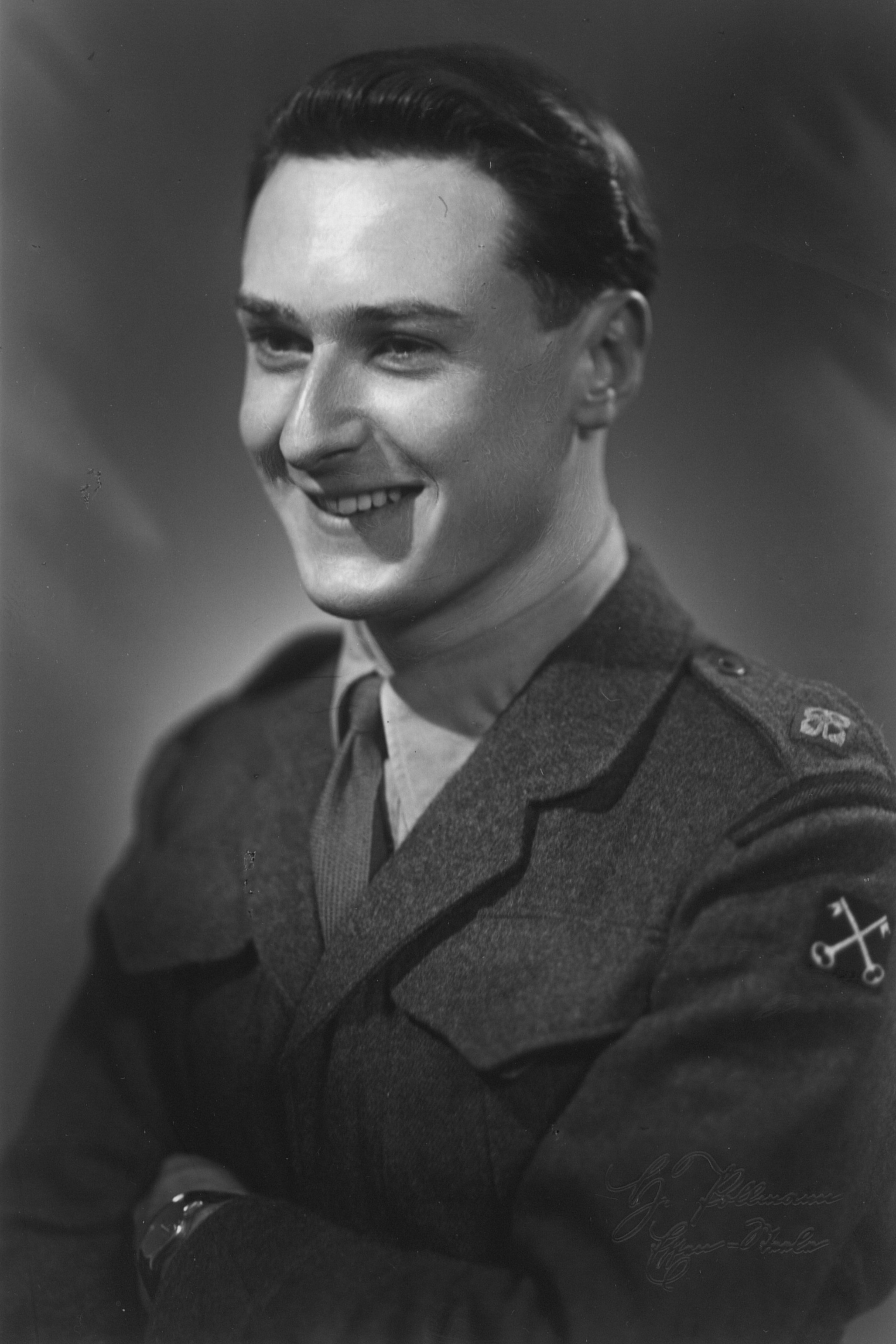
- Ian Stewart during National Service in 1949
- Nationality: (United Kingdom) British
- Born: Ian Macpherson McCallum Stewart; 15 July 1929 Edinburgh, Scotland
- Died: 19 March 2017 (aged 87) Crieff, Perthshire, Scotland
Ian Stewart
Formula One World Championship career
- Active years: 1953
- Team: privateer Connaught
- Entries: 1
- First entry: 1953 British Grand Prix
24 Hours of Le Mans career
- Years: 1952–1954
- Teams: Jaguar Cars Ltd.
- Best finish: 4th (1953)

Ian Macpherson McCallum Stewart (15 July 1929 – 19 March 2017) was a British racing driver from Scotland.

Stewart was regarded by Jim Clark as a highly-strung individual who "at the wheel was as relaxed as anyone". His only appearance in a World Championship Grand Prix came at the 1953 RAC British Grand Prix, in which – due to ignition failure – he failed to finish in his Ecurie Ecosse-entered Connaught-Lea Francis A. Stewart's main competition was as part of the Jaguar racing Ecurie Ecosse team.

Stewart made a name for himself racing a Jaguar XK120 in British national events, winning 23 races in just three seasons, including the Jersey International and the Wakefield Trophy. He was a founder member of Ecurie Ecosse who adopted the colour he had resprayed his XK120 as their team colour, he was also responsible for their distinctive badge. During this period, he was one of three Ecurie Ecosse drivers for the team's debut race at Charterhall, which resulted in a second place for Stewart. It was with the Merchiston team that Stewart won most of his races. This success led to some works outings for the Jaguar marque at Le Mans.

It is often said that during the 1954 Les 24 Heures du Mans he rolled an Aston Martin DB3S on the fast stretch between Arnage and White House corners; that however was Jimmy Stewart, the older brother of future Formula One driver's champion Jackie Stewart. Ian had already retired from racing following a crash in the 1954 Argentinian 1000k sports car race to tend to his family's agricultural and public house businesses in Perth and Kinross.

== Racing record ==
=== Career highlights ===
Season	Series	Position	Team	Car
1951	Scottish Grand Prix	3rd		Jaguar XK120
1952	Jersey International Road Race	1st	Ecurie Ecosse	Jaguar C-Type
	Wakefield Trophy	1st	Ecurie Ecosse	Jaguar C-Type
	Charterhall International	1st	Ecurie Ecosse	Jaguar C-Type
1953	Charterhall International	2nd	Ecurie Ecosse	Jaguar C-Type
	Internationales ADAC 1000 km Rennen Weltmeistershaftslauf Nürburgring	2nd	Ecurie Ecosse	Jaguar C-Type
	Goodwood Nine-Hours	3rd	Jaguar Cars Ltd	Jaguar C-Type

=== Complete Formula One World Championship results ===
(key)

Year	Entrant	Chassis	Engine	1	2	3	4	5	6	7	8	9	WDC	Points
1953	Ecurie Ecosse	Connaught Type A	Lea-Francis I4	ARG	500	NED	BEL	FRA	GBR; Ret	GER	SUI	ITA	NC	0

=== Complete 24 Hours of Le Mans results ===
Year	Team	Co-Drivers	Car	Class	Laps	Pos.	Class Pos.
1952	(United Kingdom) Jaguar Ltd.	(United Kingdom) Peter Whitehead	Jaguar C-Type	S5.0		DNF (Head gasket)	
1953	(United Kingdom) Jaguar Cars Ltd.	(United Kingdom) Peter Whitehead	Jaguar C-Type	S5.0	297	4th	3rd
