= Ninian Sanderson =

British racing driver (1925–1985)

- Nationality: (United Kingdom) British
- Born: 14 March 1925 Glasgow, Scotland
- Died: 1 October 1985 (aged 60) Glasgow, Scotland

24 Hours of Le Mans career
- Years: 1955 – 1963
- Teams: Triumph; Ecurie Ecosse; TVR; AC Cars
- Best finish: 1st (1956)
- Class wins: 2 (1956, 1963)

Ninian Sanderson (14 May 1925 – 1 October 1985) was a Scottish car dealer, sports car racing driver, and winner of the 1956 24 Hours of Le Mans.

== Racing career ==
Sanderson was born in Glasgow. In common with many drivers of his era, he cut his racing teeth in the highly competitive 500cc Formula 3 class in the early 1950s. He is best known for winning the 1956 24 Hours of Le Mans for the Ecurie Ecosse team, together with Ron Flockhart in an ex-works Jaguar D-Type. The following year Sanderson again competed for Ecurie Ecosse, finishing second with co-driver John "Jock" Lawrence, only beaten by the other Ecurie Ecosse D-Type driven by Flockhart and Ivor Bueb.

Sanderson took part in several non-championship Formula Two and Formula One races with Ecurie Ecosse, with a best result of third in the 1952 Scotland National Trophy and 1952 Joe Fry Memorial Trophy. He was a reserve driver with the team for the 1953 British Grand Prix but did not compete in the race.

In 1999, the Jaguar sports car that won the 1956 24 Hours of Le Mans was sold at Christie's in London for £1.71 million. At that time it was the most expensive car ever bought at auction.

Although reputedly not the easiest of men to get along with, Sanderson was well known in racing circles for his lively sense of humour. Fond of practical jokes he was not averse to putting firecrackers up exhaust pipes and ribbing members of the public with his race-bred black humour. The contrast in personalities within the Ecurie Ecosse team was stark; down-to-Earth, Glaswegian Sanderson, and refined, Edinburgh-born Flockhart were "like chalk and cheese".

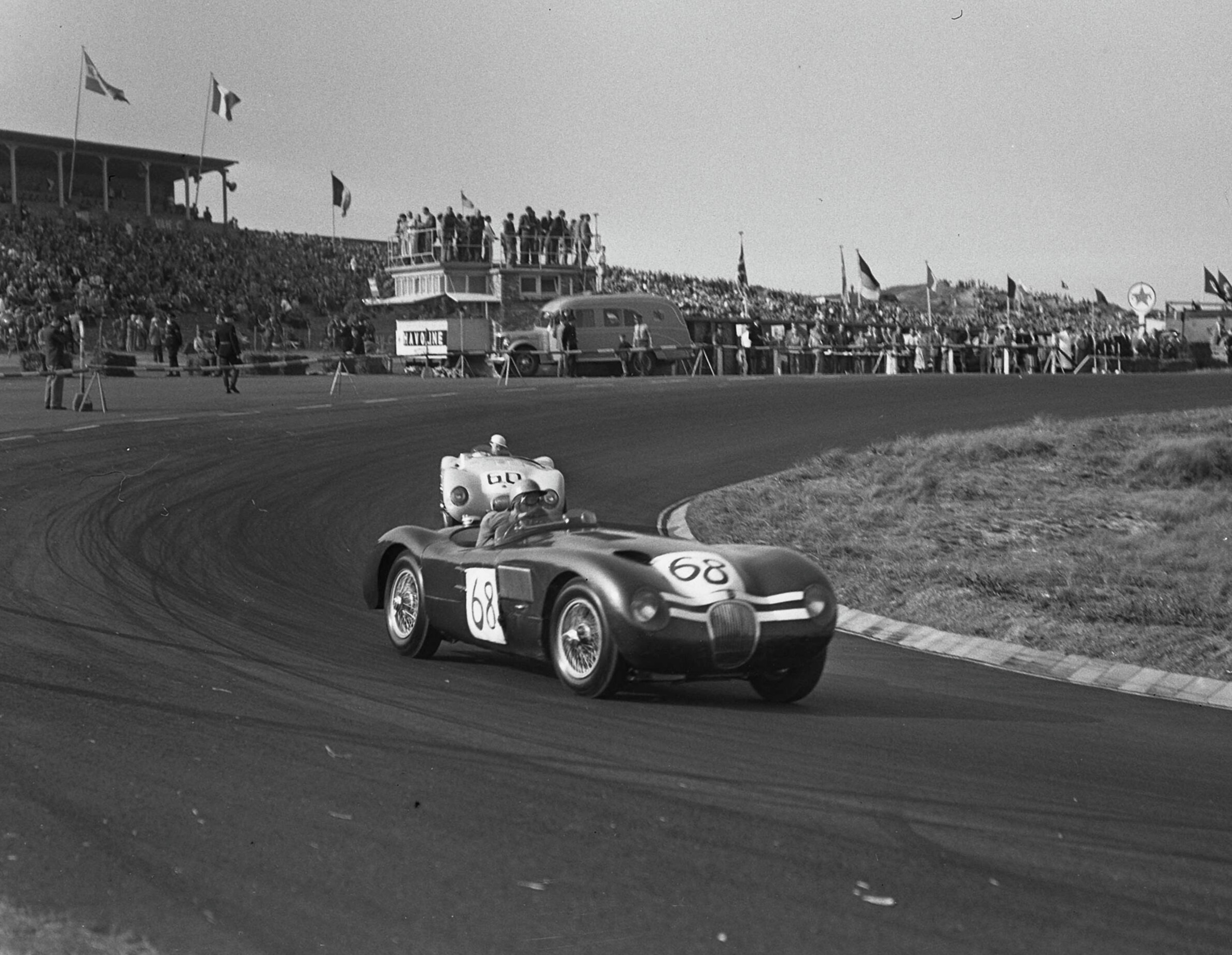
Ninian Sanderson driving an Ecurie Ecosse-entered Jaguar C-Type at Zandvoort in 1954

Sanderson was also a keen yachtsman and regularly raced his yachts on the Clyde with the same competitive spirit and ebullience as in his motor racing. He owned several beautiful Clyde boatyard McGruer-built yachts: a Dragon class keelboat named "Corsair" built in 1947 and an 8-metre class cruiser racer "Debbie" built in 1966. In 1974 he also commissioned McGruer to build his well-known 3/4-Tonner racing yacht "Nippie Sweetie".

In 1983, Sanderson and Jim Watt raised £10,500 for the medical oncology unit at the Glasgow Royal Infirmary following a sponsored canoe trip from Broomielaw to Tarbert, Loch Fyne. Sanderson had been receiving treatment at the unit for several years; he died of cancer in 1985. His wife Dorothy Sanderson died in 2007.

Sanderson was educated at Strathallan School. In the announcement of his death the school magazine The Strathallian quoted F1 racing World champion Jackie Stewart describing Sanderson as a 'perfectionist, with immense spirit and commitment.'

== Racing record ==
=== Complete 24 Hours of Le Mans results ===
Year	Team	Co-Drivers	Car	Class	Laps	Pos.	Class Pos.
1955	(United Kingdom) Standard Triumph Ltd.	(United Kingdom) Bob Dickson	Triumph TR2	S2.0	242	14th	5th
1956	(United Kingdom) Ecurie Ecosse	(United Kingdom) Ron Flockhart	Jaguar D-Type	S5.0	300	1st	1st
1957	(United Kingdom) Ecurie Ecosse	(United Kingdom) John 'Jock' Lawrence	Jaguar D-Type	S5.0	319	2nd	2nd
1958	(United Kingdom) Ecurie Ecosse	(United Kingdom) John 'Jock' Lawrence	Jaguar D-Type	S3.0	2	DNF (Engine)	
1959	(United Kingdom) Standard Triumph Ltd	(Belgium) Claude Dubois	Triumph TR3S	GT2.0	114	DNF (Radiator)	
1960	(United Kingdom) Standard Triumph Ltd	(United Kingdom) Peter Bolton	Triumph TRS	S2.0	249	N/C*	
1961	(United Kingdom) Ecurie Ecosse	(United Kingdom) Alan McKay	Austin-Healey Sebring Sprite	S1.0	40	DNF (Accident)	
1962	(United Kingdom) TVR Cars	(United Kingdom) Peter Bolton	TVR Grantura Mk3	E2.0	3	DNF (Overheating)	
1963	(United Kingdom) AC Cars Ltd	(United Kingdom) Peter Bolton	AC Cobra Hardtop	GT+3.0	310	7th	1st
Sources:

- Note *: Not Classified because car failed to complete 80% of its Index of Performance distance.

=== Complete 12 Hours of Sebring results ===
Year	Team	Co-Drivers	Car	Class	Laps	Pos.	Class Pos.
1958	(United Kingdom) Ecurie Ecosse	(United Kingdom) Ivor Bueb	Jaguar D-Type	S3.0	22	DNF (Valve springs)	

Sporting positions
Preceded by Mike Hawthorn; Ivor Bueb	Winner of the 24 Hours of Le Mans; 1956 with: Ron Flockhart	Succeeded by Ron Flockhart; Ivor Bueb
