= Franz Bueb =

German painter

Franz Bueb (1916 or 1919 – March 26, 1982) was a German painter.

== Life and work ==
Born in Schleswig-Holstein in either 1916 or 1919, Franz Bueb enrolled in a Berlin art school, but emigrated to the United States following the Nazi Party's rise to power. His seventeen years in America brought him into contact with a number of well-known people. His art became known through numerous exhibitions, murals, magazine covers, and portraits of female celebrities. Bueb worked as a photographer for Life magazine and other lifestyle periodicals. He returned to Europe in 1954, settling in Paris, from where he made trips to Italy, Spain, England, and Norway. In 1959, he traveled to Austria and decided to move to Grillenberg, in Lower Austria. There he built a cottage from the remains of a log cabin he found in a nearby pond. Though he traveled frequently, Bueb featured his home and the surrounding area in his later work. He died in Vienna in 1982.

== Exhibitions ==
- 2016: Franz Bueb – Jackie Kennedys liebster Maler, Krupp Stadt Museum, Berndorf

== Catalogue ==
- Eleonore Rodler: Franz Bueb – RETROspektive, Kral, Berndorf, 2014 ISBN 978-3-99024-279-7
