= Ivor Bueb =

British racing driver (1923–1959)

- Born: 6 June 1923; East Ham, Essex, England, UK
- Died: 1 August 1959 (aged 36); Near Clermont-Ferrand, France

Formula One World Championship career
- Nationality: (United Kingdom) British
- Active years: 1957–1959
- Team(s): Connaught, non-works Maserati, Lotus and Cooper
- Entries: 6 (5 starts)
- Championships: 0
- Wins: 0
- Podiums: 0
- Career points: 0
- Pole positions: 0
- Fastest laps: 0
- First entry: 1957 Monaco Grand Prix
- Last entry: 1959 British Grand Prix

Ivor Léon John Bueb (/ˈbwɛb/; 6 June 1923 – 1 August 1959) was a British professional sports car racing and Formula One driver from England.

== Early life ==
Ivor Léon John Bueb was born to Léon Gervase Bueb and Grace Marie Alice Vagnolini in East Ham, Essex. His father was born in Breisach, Germany to French parents and his mother had English, Italian and Welsh grandparents. They divorced in 1926. Bueb spent his childhood in Dulwich, South London, regularly visiting Crystal Palace to watch Prince Bira, Freddie Dixon and Raymond Mays compete.

== Career ==
Bueb started racing seriously in a Formula Three 500cc Cooper in 1953, graduating to the Cooper works team in 1955 when he finished second in the British championship. He made occasional starts in Grands Prix in 1957 with a Connaught and a Maserati run by Gilby Engineering. The following year he raced Bernie Ecclestone's Connaught at Monaco, and drove a Formula Two Lotus at the German Grand Prix.

In 1959, Bueb had two outings for BRP, firstly a non-qualification at Monaco, then another Formula Two entry at the British Grand Prix. He participated in six Formula One World Championship Grands Prix in all, but scored no championship points. He also participated in numerous non-Championship Formula One races. With the death of Archie Scott Brown at Spa in May 1958, Brian Lister hired Bueb to fill the now-vacant Lister-Jaguar driver's seat. Bueb did an admirable job, scoring several first places at tracks such as Crystal Palace and Goodwood during the 1958 and 1959 sports car campaigns.

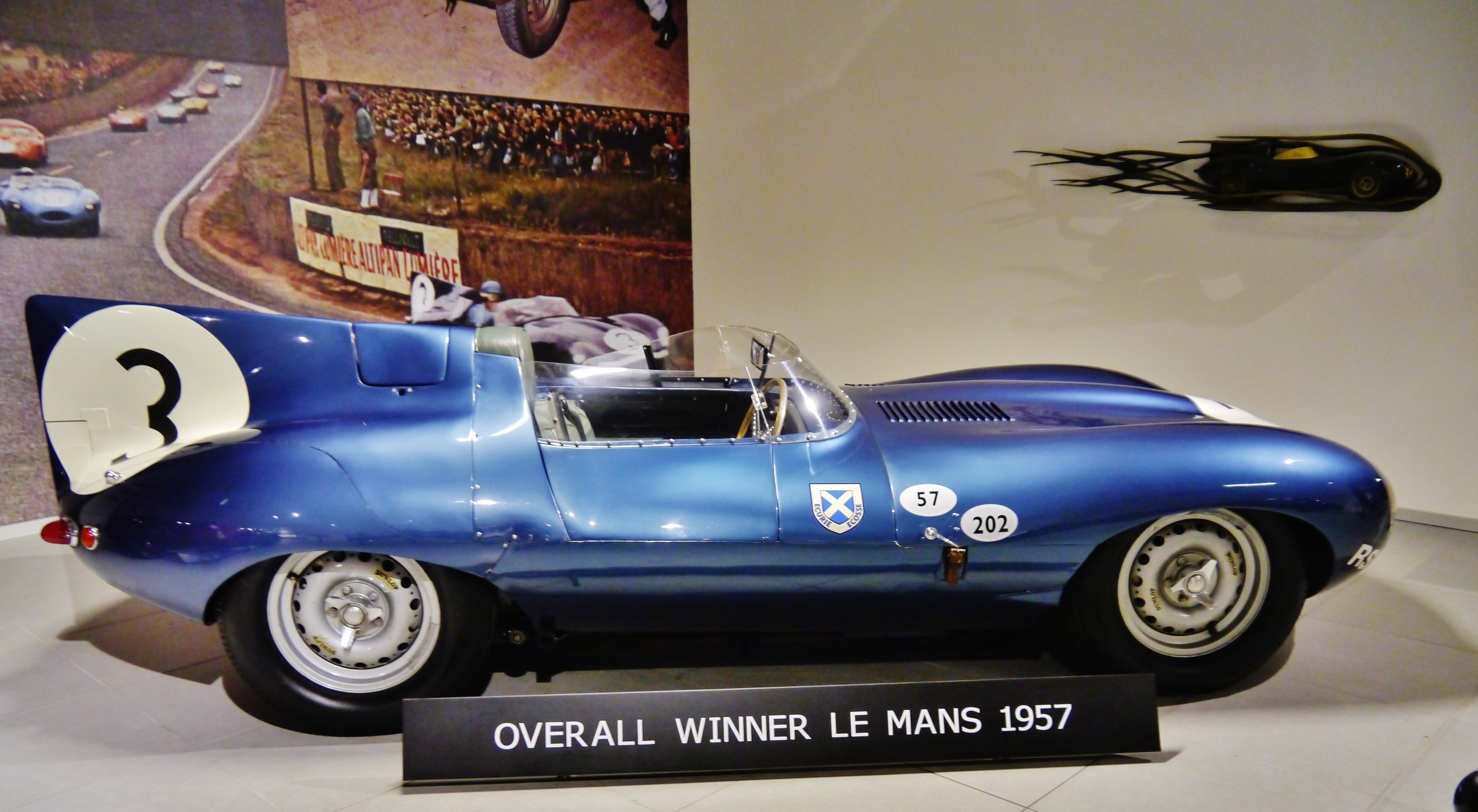
Ivor Bueb's winning car from the 1957 24 Hours of Le Mans

Bueb is perhaps best known for sharing the winning works Jaguar D-type with Mike Hawthorn in the 1955 24 Hours of Le Mans which was marred by an accident in which 82 spectators were killed; a success he repeated with Ron Flockhart in the ex-works Ecurie Ecosse car in 1957.

Bueb suffered serious injuries in 1959 when he crashed his BRP Cooper-Borgward Formula Two car at the Charade Circuit near Clermont-Ferrand, France. He crashed at Gravenoire, a multiple apex-section at the very far end of the circuit, and was thrown out of his Cooper. After being carried off the circuit by Gendarmes in a way that probably worsened his injuries, Bueb died six days later at a hospital near the circuit.

It was Bueb's death, in conjunction with Archie Scott Brown's demise, that finally led Brian Lister to shut down his very successful sports car racing effort. Bueb's funeral was held at Manor Park Cemetery in Newham, London on the 10 August. It was attended by his family, friends, and widowed wife. His father was unable to attend, but arranged a high mass in Clermont-Ferrand at the same time.

== Personal life ==
Bueb served in the RAF during WW2. After returning he invested money into selling ex-War department vehicles in Newport, Monmouthshire. He obtained his Aviator's Certificate in 1949 in Cardiff, piloting a DH82A Tiger Moth. Upon moving back to Cheltenham in the early 1950s, he began his career in motorsport, helped by Geoffrey Turk. Bueb was affectionally called 'Ivor the Driver' by his peers, a play on 'Ivan the Terrible'. After his tragic accident in 1959, fellow racer Jimmy Ebdon paid tribute:

Despite his burly figure, he was indeed a quiet and very sensitive person. He was very modest in success and always most outspoken about his failures.

Bueb was survived by his wife, Florence Ada Bueb (1925-2009) and his son, David Ivor Lee Bueb Thomas, who died in 1988.

== Racing record ==
=== Complete Formula One World Championship results ===
(key)

Year	Entrant	Chassis	Engine	1	2	3	4	5	6	7	8	9	10	11	WDC	Points
1957	Connaught Engineering	Connaught Type B	Alta Straight-4	ARG	MON; Ret	500	FRA								NC	0
1957	Gilby Engineering Ltd.	Maserati 250F	Maserati Straight-6					GBR; NC	GER	PES	ITA				NC	0
1958	BC Ecclestone	Connaught Type B	Alta Straight-4	ARG	MON	NED	500	BEL	FRA	GBR; Ret					NC	0
1958	Ecurie Demi Litre	Lotus 12	Climax Straight-4								GER; 11 *	POR	ITA	MOR	NC	0
1959	British Racing Partnership	Cooper T51	Climax Straight-4	MON; DNQ	500	NED	FRA								NC	0
1959	British Racing Partnership	Cooper T51	Borgward Straight-4					GBR; 13	GER	POR	ITA	USA			NC	0

* Formula 2 entry.

=== Complete British Saloon Car Championship results ===
(key) (Races in bold indicate pole position; races in italics indicate fastest lap.)

Year	Team	Car	Class	1	2	3	4	5	6	7	DC	Pts	Class
1959	Equipe Endeavour	Jaguar 3.4-Litre	D	GOO ovr:1 cls:1	**AIN** ovr:1 cls:1	**SIL** ovr:1 cls:1	GOO	SNE	BRH	BRH	NC	0	NC

=== Complete 24 Hours of Le Mans results ===
Year	Team	Co-Drivers	Car	Class	Laps	Pos.	Class Pos.
1955	(United Kingdom) Jaguar Cars Ltd.	(United Kingdom) Mike Hawthorn	Jaguar D-Type	S5.0	307	**1st**	**1st**
1956	(United Kingdom) Jaguar Cars Ltd.	(United Kingdom) Mike Hawthorn	Jaguar D-Type FI	S5.0	280	6th	**3rd**
1957	(United Kingdom) Ecurie Ecosse	(United Kingdom) Ron Flockhart	Jaguar D-Type	S5.0	327	**1st**	**1st**
1958	(United Kingdom) J. D. Hamilton (private entrant)	(United Kingdom) Duncan Hamilton	Jaguar D-Type	S3.0	251	DNF (Accident)	
1959	(United Kingdom) Brian Lister Engineering	(United Kingdom) Bruce Halford	Lister Sport	S3.0	121	DNF (Engine)	

=== Complete 12 Hours of Sebring results ===
Year	Team	Co-Drivers	Car	Class	Laps	Pos.	Class Pos.
1956	(United States) Jaguar of New York Distributors Inc.	(United Kingdom) Duncan Hamilton	Jaguar D-Type	S5.0	63	DNF (Brakes)	
1957	(United States) Jaguar Cars North America	(United Kingdom) Mike Hawthorn	Jaguar D-Type	S5.0	193	**3rd**	**2nd**
1958	(United Kingdom) Ecurie Ecosse	(United Kingdom) Ninian Sanderson	Jaguar D-Type	S3.0	22	DNF (Valve springs)	
1959	(United Kingdom) The Lister Corp.	(United Kingdom) Stirling Moss	Lister-Jaguar	S3.0	98	DSQ (Illegal refuelling)	

Preceded by José Froilán González; Maurice Trintignant	Winner of the 24 Hours of Le Mans; 1955; With: Mike Hawthorn	Succeeded by Ron Flockhart; Ninian Sanderson
Preceded by Ron Flockhart; Ninian Sanderson	Winner of the 24 Hours of Le Mans; 1957; With: Ron Flockhart	Succeeded by Olivier Gendebien; Phil Hill
