= Ecurie Ecosse =

Former Scottish motor racing team

(Scotland) Ecurie Ecosse
- Full name: Ecurie Ecosse
- Base: Merchiston, Edinburgh
- Founder(s): David Murray, Wilkie Wilkinson, Hugh McCaig (revivals)
- Noted staff: David Murray, Wilkie Wilkinson
- Noted drivers: David Murray; Ian Stewart; Jimmy Stewart; Leslie Thorne; Hugh McCaig (revivals)

Formula One World Championship career
- First entry: 1952 British Grand Prix
- Races entered: 3
- Constructors: Cooper; Connaught
- Final entry: 1954 British Grand Prix

Ecurie Ecosse (French for "Scotland Stable") was a motor racing team from Edinburgh, Scotland. The team was founded in November 1951 by Edinburgh businessman and racing driver David Murray and mechanic Wilkie Wilkinson. Its most notable achievement was winning the 1956 and the 1957 24 Hours of Le Mans. The team also raced in three Formula One races. Ecurie Ecosse's cars were always distinctive in their flag blue metallic paint.

The name was revived by driver Hugh McCaig for multiple spells of competitive racing 1984-1993, in 2011 with Barwell Motorsport, and 2017-2018 with Nielsen Racing, and with Blackthorn (2025/26) across multiple sportscar series.

== Formula One ==
Ecurie Ecosse had four Formula One Grand Prix entries, over three seasons. The first was by David Murray himself, driving a Cooper T20 in the 1952 British Grand Prix. However, he retired with engine trouble early in the race.

For the 1953 event, the team entered two cars: a Cooper T20 for Jimmy Stewart and a new Connaught A Type for Ian Stewart. Neither of the drivers finished the race; Jimmy spun off track on lap 79, and Ian retired with engine problems.

The team's last F1 outing was at the 1954 British Grand Prix where the Connaught was again entered, this time driven by Leslie Thorne. Although the car did take the finish, it came in twelve laps down on the leaders. From this point onward, the team concentrated on sports car events.

=== Complete Formula One World Championship results ===
(key)

Year	Chassis	Engine	Tyres	Driver	1	2	3	4	5	6	7	8	9
1952	Cooper T20	Bristol BS1 2.0 L6	D		SUI	500	BEL	FRA	GBR	GER	NED	ITA	
1952	Cooper T20	Bristol BS1 2.0 L6	D	(United Kingdom) David Murray					Ret				
1953	Connaught Type A Cooper T20	Lea-Francis 2.0 L4; Bristol BS1 2.0 L6	D		ARG	500	NED	BEL	FRA	GBR	GER	SUI	ITA
1953	Connaught Type A Cooper T20	Lea-Francis 2.0 L4; Bristol BS1 2.0 L6	D	(United Kingdom) Ian Stewart						Ret			
1953	Connaught Type A Cooper T20	Lea-Francis 2.0 L4; Bristol BS1 2.0 L6	D	(United Kingdom) Jimmy Stewart						Ret			
1954	Connaught Type A	Lea Francis 2.0 L4	D		ARG	500	BEL	FRA	GBR	GER	SUI	ITA	ESP
1954	Connaught Type A	Lea Francis 2.0 L4	D	(United Kingdom) Leslie Thorne					14†				

† Not classified; 12 laps behind

== Formula Two ==
Ecurie Ecosse also raced in the European Formula Two Championship, from 1969 until 1971. Their first race was in 1969 at Thruxton where driver Graham Birrell finished 11th in a Brabham BT23C. At Enna, Birrell could not start the race because he had crashed the car in practice and the team could not repair the car before the race. In 1970 Ecurie Ecosse entered the same car for Birrell. At Crystal Palace, Birrell finished in 11th position. In the next race, held at the Hockenheimring, Birrell finished in 12th position. In Imola, Richard Attwood took over from Birrell; after finishing sixth in the first heat, he was unable to start the second heat and was therefore not classified. In 1971 Ecurie Ecosse had a new driver, Tom Walkinshaw, and a new car, a March 712M. At Thruxton, Walkinshaw retired on lap three due to a puncture. At the Nürburgring, Gerry Birrell finished in ninth position. In their last two races, at Jarama and Crystal Palace, Walkinshaw failed to qualify for the race.

=== Complete European Formula Two results ===
(key) (Results in bold indicate pole position; results in italics indicate fastest lap; † indicates shared drive.)

Year	Chassis	Engine(s)	Drivers	1	2	3	4	5	6	7	8	9	10	11
1969	Brabham BT23C	Cosworth FVA		THR	HOC	NÜR	JAR	TUL	PER	VAL				
1969	Brabham BT23C	Cosworth FVA	(United Kingdom) Graham Birrell	11					DNS					
1970	Brabham BT30	Cosworth FVA		THR	HOC	BAR	PAL	HOC	PER	TUL	IMO	HOC		
1970	Brabham BT30	Cosworth FVA	(United Kingdom) Graham Birrell				11	12						
1970	Brabham BT30	Cosworth FVA	(United Kingdom) Richard Attwood								Ret			
1971	March 712M	Cosworth FVA		HOC	THR	NÜR	JAR	PAL	ROU	MAN	TUL	ALB	VAL	VAL
1971	March 712M	Cosworth FVA	(United Kingdom) Tom Walkinshaw		Ret		DNQ	DNQ						
1971	March 712M	Cosworth FVA	(United Kingdom) Gerry Birrell			9								

== 24 Hours of Le Mans ==
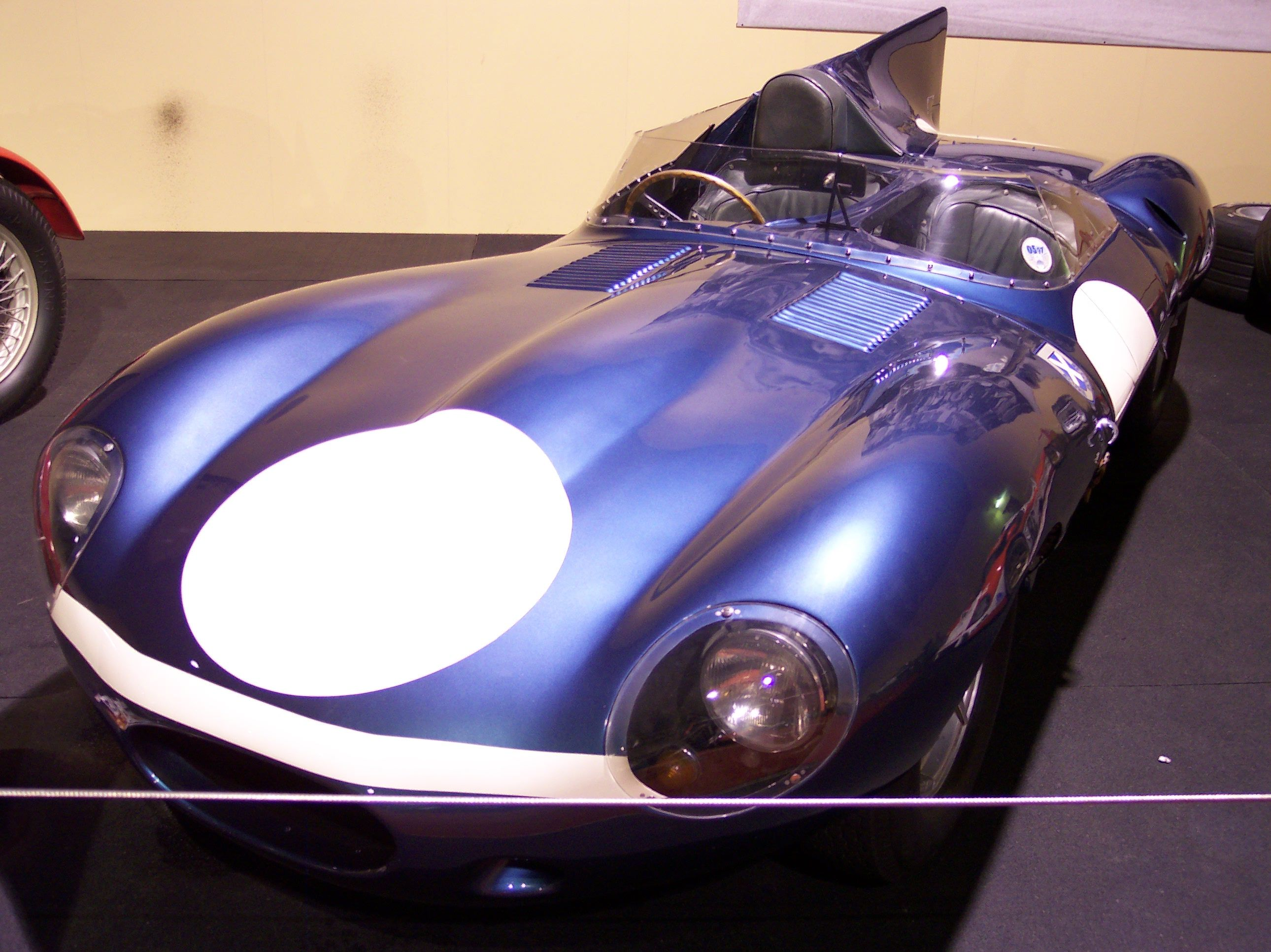
A Jaguar D-Type in the metallic blue with white nose-band livery of Ecurie Ecosse (1956 Le Mans race)

In the 1956 24 Hours of Le Mans, Ron Flockhart and Ninian Sanderson were the winning drivers in a Jaguar D-Type.

Ron Flockhart won again with a D-Type in the 1957 event, partnered this time by Ivor Bueb. The team's second D-Type – driven by Sanderson and his new partner John Lawrence – finished second, a rare privateer 1–2 finish.

The 1958 Le Mans race was less successful; both of the Ecurie Ecosse D-Types, this time with Masten Gregory and Jack Fairman added to the driver line-up, suffered engine failure within a few laps of the start.

The team would again field a D-Type at Le Mans in 1959, alongside a newly acquired Tojeiro-Jaguar. Once again, neither car made it to the final flag, the D-Type suffering engine failure after 70 laps, and the Tojeiro a fire after 137.

Things went from bad to worse for the team in the 1960 running. The, by now much modified, D-Type was again entered, and lasted until the 168th lap before being forced out with a broken crankshaft. Ecurie Ecosse's second car for this year, a Cooper T49 Monaco, did not even make it to the start line.

The entrants for the 1961 24 Hours of Le Mans – a Cooper T57 Monaco and an Austin-Healey Sebring Sprite – retired after accidents in their 32nd and 40th laps respectively.

1962 saw Ecurie Ecosse moving on to a Tojeiro EE, but this too failed to finish after gearbox problems. This would be the last time that the original Ecurie Ecosse team would enter a car for the greatest endurance race in the world. Financial troubles and the self-imposed tax exile of founder David Murray had effectively ended the team's competitive era by the mid-1960s.

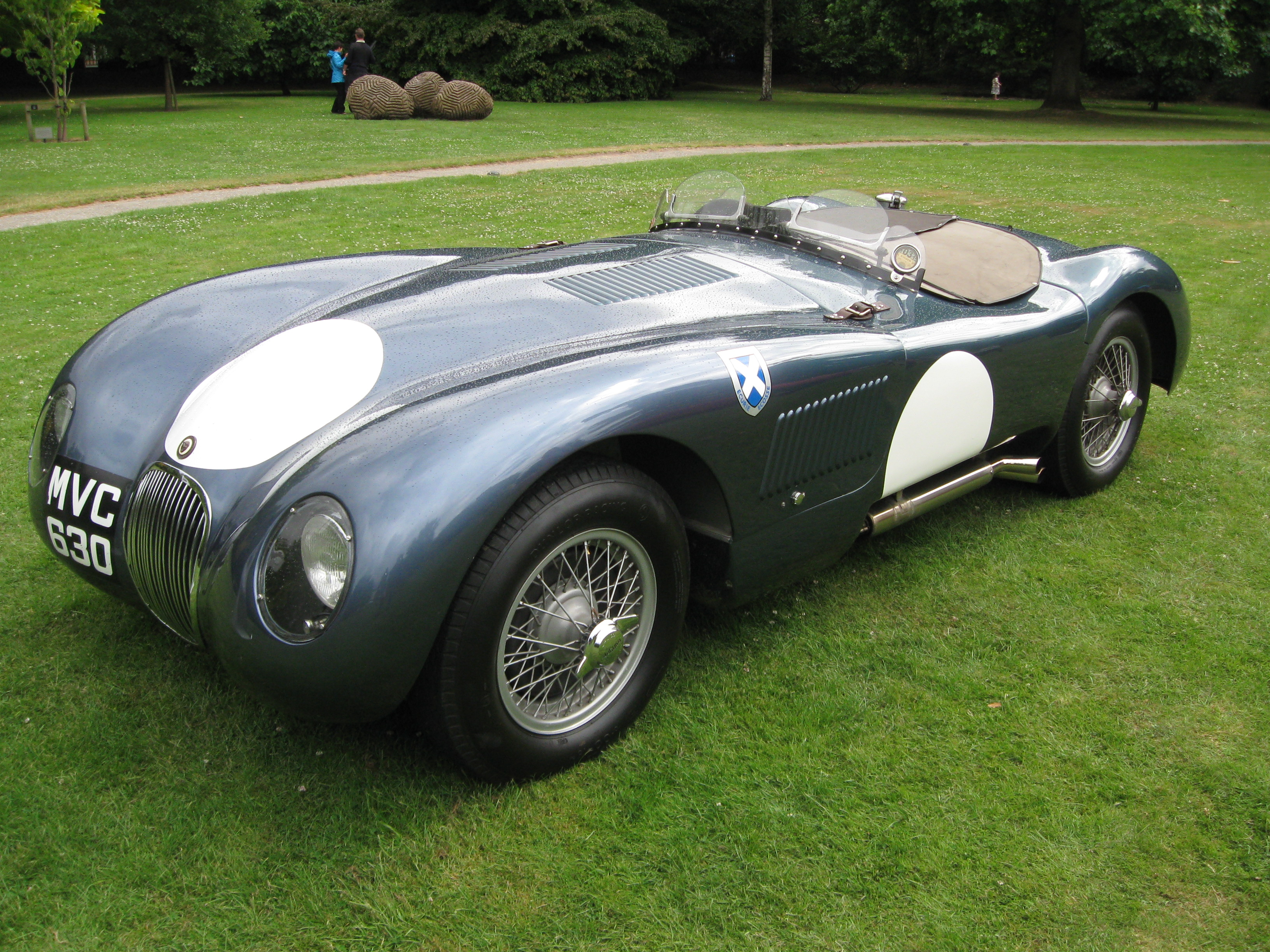
1953 Jaguar C-Type in Ecurie Ecosse colours, displayed at Dulwich Picture Gallery, 29 June 2014

== Drivers ==
The drivers included David Murray himself; Jimmy Stewart; his younger brother, three-time F1 World Champion Jackie Stewart; fellow F1 drivers Jim Clark and Innes Ireland; Masten Gregory; Ian Stewart; Leslie Thorne; Ron Flockhart; Ninian Sanderson; Roy Salvadori; Ivor Bueb; John Lawrence; Jack Fairman; Bill Stein; Edward Labinjoh; Willie Forbes; Tom Walkinshaw.

== 1980s revival ==
1985 Ecosse-Cosworth C2

The original team ceased operating in 1971, but the team name was revived in the 1980s by enthusiast and driver Hugh McCaig. In 1986 the team won the C2 class of the World Sportscar Championship; they had been runners-up the previous year. They also entered Vauxhall Cavaliers in the British Touring Car Championship with some success in 1992 and 1993, including a win at Thruxton in 1993 for David Leslie, who also won the non-championship TOCA Shootout that year at Donington Park.

== 2011 revival ==
In 2011, team boss Hugh McCaig announced that four young drivers, Alasdair McCaig, Andrew Smith, Joe Twyman and Oliver Bryant, would revive the team once more and drive a return to sports car racing for the team, 25 years after winning the World Sportscar Championship in 1986 in the C2 class. The team entered an Aston Martin DBRS9, along with the help of Aston Martin Racing partner team Barwell Motorsport, into the 2011 24 Hours of Spa in the GT3 class.

== 2026 revival ==
To celebrate the team's 70th anniversary of their overall 1956 24 Hours of Le Mans win, it was announced they would debut in the 2025-26 Asian Le Mans Series with Blackthorn. The Ecurie Ecosse Blackthorn Aston Martin Vantage AMR GT3 Evo will be piloted by Jonny Adam, Giacomo Petrobelli and Kobe Pauwels, and could pave the way for qualification to the 2026 24 Hours of Le Mans and a request to enter the 2026 European Le Mans Series.

== Team car transporter ==
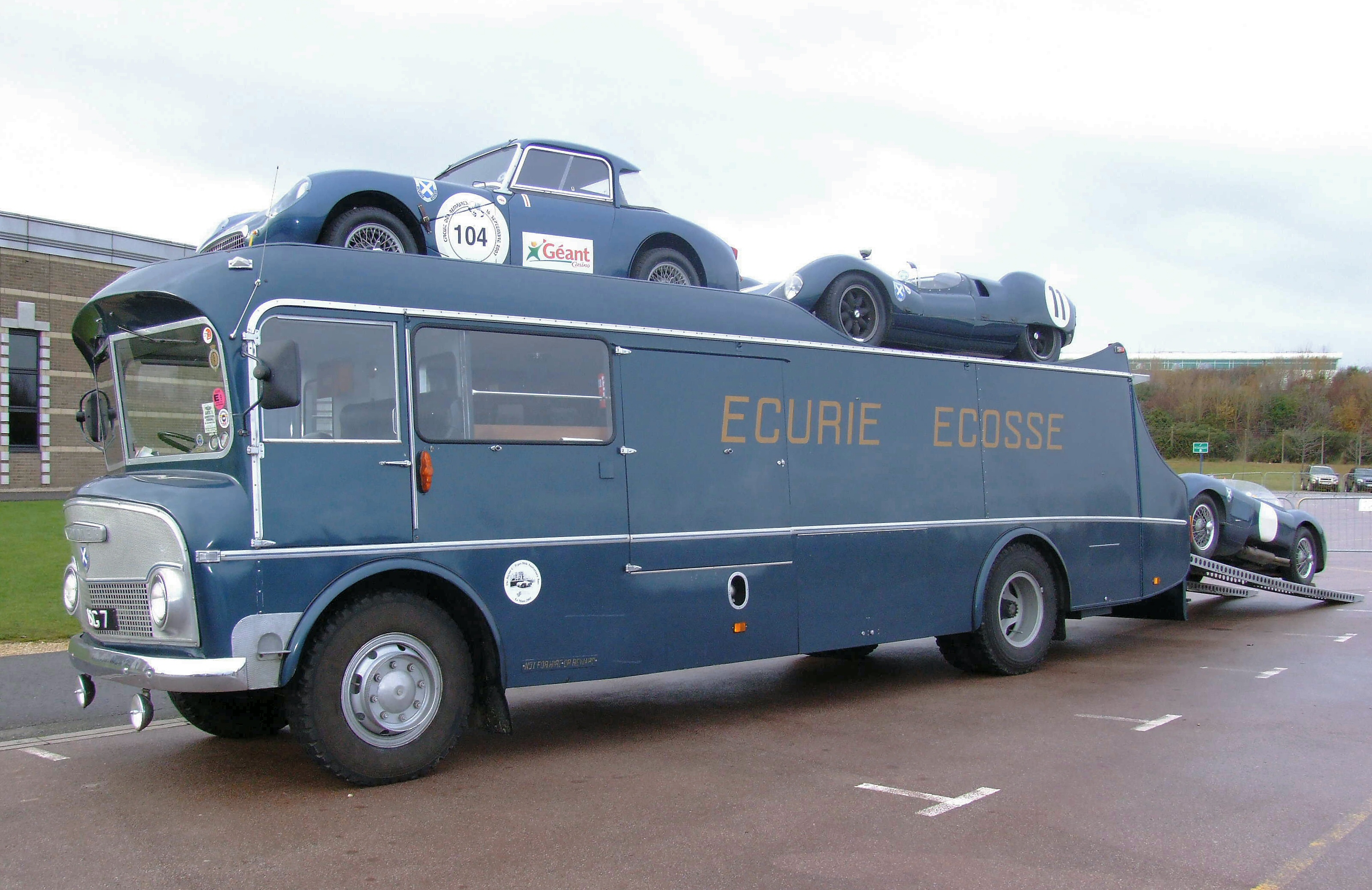
The restored Ecurie Ecosse Car Transporter

The team was accompanied by a 2-axle double-deck car transporter capable of carrying three cars (one inside and two on top) together with a support crew, and with mobile workshop facilities.

The transporter was designed by Selby Howgate and built by coachbuilders Alexander, of Falkirk, Scotland. Based on a Commer chassis, it is powered by a Commer TS3 three-cylinder horizontally opposed two-stroke diesel engine.

From the early 1990s, enthusiast collector Dick Skipworth built up his remarkable Ecurie Ecosse Collection. Into 2013 it comprised Jaguar XK120, C-Type and D-Type, Tojeiro-Jaguar, Cooper-Climax Monaco, Le Mans Austin-Healey Sprite, Tojeiro EE-Buick Coupe and the Commer Transporter. On 5 December 2013, this entire collection was sold at auction by Bonhams at New Bond Street, London. The collection sold for a total £8.8-million Sterling – the Transporter alone for a world record £1.8-million.

== Models ==
The Le Mans wins captured the public's imagination, and British die-cast model manufacturer Corgi brought out a 1/48 scale model of the transporter in its Corgi Major series, which proved very popular. A number of sets were produced with differing vehicles; for example, Gift Set No 16 issued in 1965 included three racing cars in individual boxes; a #151A Lotus X1, a #152S BRM and a #154 Ferrari. Although out of production, the Corgi sets have remained popular among collectors. SInce late 2025 The Corgi Model Club which is now fully owned by Hornby, released a copy of the original model, with full working parts, and then in November 2025, they announced they had a "very limited" amount of pale blue version of the same vehicle.

== Bibliography ==
- Dymock, Eric: Ecurie Ecosse: David Murray and the Legendary Scottish Motor Racing Team (PJ Publishing, 2007, ISBN 978-0-9550102-2-4)
- Gauld, Graham: Ecurie Ecosse: A Social History of Motor Racing from the Fifties to the Nineties (Graham Gauld Public Relations, Edinburgh, 1992, ISBN 0-9519488-0-6)
- Murray, David: Ecurie Ecosse: The Story of Scotland's International Racing Team (Stanley Paul, London, 1962)
