= Jimmy Stewart (racing driver) =

British racing driver (1931–2008)

- Born: 6 March 1931
- Died: 3 January 2008 (aged 76)

Formula One World Championship career
- Nationality: (United Kingdom) British
- Active years: 1953
- Team: Ecurie Ecosse
- Entries: 1
- Championships: 0
- Wins: 0
- Podiums: 0
- Career points: 0
- Pole positions: 0
- Fastest laps: 0
- First entry: 1953 British Grand Prix

James Robert Stewart (6 March 1931 – 3 January 2008) was a British racing driver from Scotland who participated in a single Formula One World Championship Grand Prix, driving for Ecurie Ecosse. He was born in Milton, West Dunbartonshire. He also competed in several non-Championship Formula One races. He was the elder brother of Jackie Stewart. Stewart later worked in the garage industry and worked closely with anti-alcohol projects in Scotland.

== Complete Formula One World Championship results ==
(key)

Year	Entrant	Chassis	Engine	1	2	3	4	5	6	7	8	9	WDC	Pts.
1953	Ecurie Ecosse	Cooper T20	Bristol Straight-6	ARG	500	NED	BEL	FRA	GBR; Ret	GER	SUI	ITA	NC	0
