= John Tojeiro =

British car designer

- Born: 3 December 1923; Estoril, Portugal
- Died: 16 March 2005 (aged 81); Cambridge, England
- Occupations: Engineer, Racing car designer
- Employer(s): Shelvoke and Drury, Dax Cars

John Tojeiro (3 December 1923, Estoril, Portugal – 16 March 2005, Cambridge, England), affectionately known as Toj, was an engineer and racing car designer whose innovations helped to revolutionise car design in the 1950s and 1960s.

Born in Estoril, Portugal, the son of a Portuguese father and English mother, the young John was brought to England in 1924 after the death of his father. Following service as an engineer in the Fleet Air Arm during World War II, he made his name in automotive engineering. Best known as a chassis engineer, he produced a long line of successful racing cars, most famously in conjunction with the Ecurie Ecosse team, using engines supplied by Jaguar, Buick, Bristol, Scirocco-Powell and Climax, among many.

The Ecurie Ecosse Tojeiro EE used the (front) mid-engine layout to enhance handling and traction. Perhaps his lasting legacy was in producing a design which AC Cars developed into the AC Ace. From the Ace, Carroll Shelby in turn developed the AC Cobra, marrying a thunderous American V8 engine with the lightweight British chassis.

In 1962, Tojeiro pioneered the use of a big US (Buick) V8 engine mounted Rear mid-engine, rear-wheel-drive layout in a tiny sportscar.
