= José Froilán González =

Argentine racing driver (1922–2013)

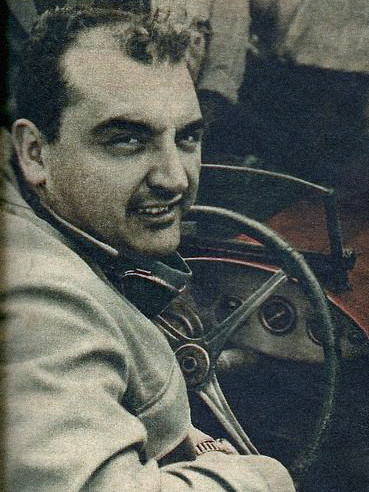
- González in 1950
- Born: 5 October 1922; Arrecifes, Argentina
- Died: 15 June 2013 (aged 90); Buenos Aires, Argentina

Formula One World Championship career
- Nationality: (Argentina) Argentine
- Active years: 1950–1957, 1960
- Team(s): Privateer Maserati, privateer Talbot-Lago, Ferrari, Maserati, Vanwall
- Entries: 26
- Championships: 0
- Wins: 2
- Podiums: 15
- Career points: 72 1/7 (77 9/14) (Note: Up until 1990, not all points scored by a driver contributed to their final World Championship tally (see list of points scoring systems for more information). Numbers without parentheses are Championship points; numbers in parentheses are total points scored.)
- Pole positions: 3
- Fastest laps: 6
- First entry: 1950 Monaco Grand Prix
- First win: 1951 British Grand Prix
- Last win: 1954 British Grand Prix
- Last entry: 1960 Argentine Grand Prix

24 Hours of Le Mans career
- Years: 1950–1951, 1953–1954
- Teams: Gordini, Talbot-Lago, Lancia, Ferrari
- Best finish: 1st (1954)

José Froilán González (5 October 1922 – 15 June 2013) was an Argentine racing driver who competed in Formula One between 1950 and 1960. (Note: The exact years González competed in Formula One: 1950–1957, 1960.) Nicknamed "the Pampas Bull" and "el Cabezón", (Note: González was known as the Pampas Bull in English media due to his stocky figure, aggressive driving style, and eastern Argentine heritage. He was also known as el Cabezón (lit. 'the Big-Headed One') in Argentina.) González was runner-up in the Formula One World Drivers' Championship in 1954 with Ferrari, and won two Grands Prix across nine seasons. In endurance racing, González won the 24 Hours of Le Mans in 1954, also with Ferrari.

González, who was a close friend of Juan Manuel Fangio and Roberto Mieres, among others, is particularly notable for scoring Ferrari's first win in a Formula One World Championship race at the 1951 British Grand Prix. He made his Formula One debut for Scuderia Achille Varzi in the 1950 Monaco Grand Prix. His last Grand Prix was the 1960 Argentine Grand Prix. González competed in 26 World Championship Formula One Grands Prix over nine seasons (1950–1957 and 1960) and numerous non-Championship events. In the 26 World Championship races, González scored two victories (the 1951 British Grand Prix and the 1954 British Grand Prix), seven second-place finishes, six third-place finishes, three pole positions, six fastest laps, and 72 1/7 points. He won the 1951 Coppa Acerbo, the 1954 24 Hours of Le Mans with Maurice Trintignant, and the Portuguese Grand Prix for Ferrari.

== Sixtieth anniversary tribute ==
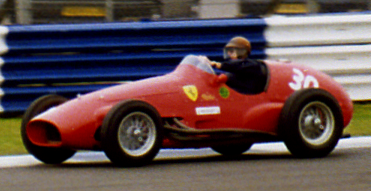
González demonstrating a Ferrari 500 in 2000

On 10 July 2011, during the British Grand Prix meeting, González was honoured by Ferrari and the FIA on the 60th anniversary of Ferrari's first Formula One World Championship race victory. As part of the celebration, Ferrari driver Fernando Alonso drove González's Ferrari 375 F1 for four laps of the Silverstone track. Later that day, Alonso won the British Grand Prix in his Ferrari 150º Italia.

== Death ==
González died in Buenos Aires from respiratory failure, aged 90, after a downturn in health following a heart attack earlier in 2013.

== Racing record ==
=== Complete Formula One World Championship results ===
(key) (Races in bold indicate pole position; races in italics indicate fastest lap)

Year	Entrant	Chassis	Engine	1	2	3	4	5	6	7	8	9	10	WDC	Pts.
1950	Scuderia Achille Varzi	Maserati 4CLT/48	Maserati L4C	GBR	MON; Ret	500	SUI	BEL	FRA; Ret	ITA				NC	0
1951	José Froilán González	Talbot-Lago T26C-GS	Talbot L6	SUI; Ret	500									**3rd**	**24** **(27)**
1951	Enrico Platé	Maserati 4CLT/48	Maserati L4			BEL; DNA								**3rd**	**24** **(27)**
1951	Scuderia Ferrari	Ferrari 375	Ferrari V12				FRA; 2*	**GBR**; 1	GER; 3	ITA; 2	ESP; 2			**3rd**	**24** **(27)**
1952	Officine Alfieri Maserati	Maserati A6GCM	Maserati L6	SUI	500	BEL	FRA	GBR	GER	NED	ITA; 2**			9th	6 1/2
1953	Officine Alfieri Maserati	Maserati A6GCM	Maserati L6	ARG; 3	500	NED; 3*	BEL; Ret	FRA; 3	GBR; 4**	GER	SUI	ITA		6th	13 1/2 (14 1/2)
1954	Scuderia Ferrari	Ferrari 625	Ferrari L4	ARG; 3	500	BEL; 4*^{†}		GBR; 1	GER; 2*	**SUI**; 2	ITA; 3*^{†}	ESP		**2nd**	**25 1/7** **(26 9/14)**
1954	Scuderia Ferrari	Ferrari 553	Ferrari L4				FRA; Ret							**2nd**	**25 1/7** **(26 9/14)**
1955	Scuderia Ferrari	Ferrari 625	Ferrari L4	**ARG**; 2*	MON	500	BEL	NED	GBR	ITA				17th	2
1956	Officine Alfieri Maserati	Maserati 250F	Maserati L6	ARG; Ret	MON	500	BEL	FRA						NC	0
1956	Vandervell Products Ltd.	Vanwall VW 2	Vanwall L4						GBR; Ret	GER	ITA			NC	0
1957	Scuderia Ferrari	Lancia-Ferrari D50	Ferrari V8	ARG; 5*	MON	500	FRA	GBR	GER	PES	ITA			21st	1
1960	Scuderia Ferrari	Ferrari Dino 246	Ferrari V6	ARG; 10	MON	500	NED	BEL	FRA	GBR	POR	ITA	USA	NC	0

* Shared drive.
** Joint fastest lap.
^{†} González started the race in a Ferrari 553 Squalo, but took over one of his teammates' 625 during the race.

=== Complete Formula One non-championship results ===
(key) (Races in bold indicate pole position; Races in italics indicate fastest lap)

Year	Entrant	Chassis	Engine	1	2	3	4	5	6	7	8	9	10	11	12	13	14	15	16	17	18	19	20	21	22	23	24	25	26	27	28	29	30	31	32	33	34	35
1950	Scuderia Achille Varzi	Maserati 4CLT/48	Maserati 1.5 s/c straight-4	PAU; Ret	RIC	SRM; Ret	PAR	EMP	BAR	JER	ALB; 2	NED; 7	NAT; Ret	NOT	ULS	PES	STT	INT	GOO	PEN																		
1951	José Froilán González	Talbot-Lago T26C-GS	Talbot-Lago 4.5 L6	SYR	PAU	RIC	SRM	BOR	INT	PAR; 2	ULS	SCO																										
1951	Enrico Platé	Maserati 4CLT/48	Maserati 4CLT 1.5 s/c L4										NED DNA	ALB																								
1951	Scuderia Ferrari	Ferrari 375	Ferrari 4.5 V12												PES; 1	BAR; 2	GOO																					
1952	Scuderia Ferrari	Ferrari 375	Ferrari 4.5 V12	SYR	VAL	**RIC**; 1	LAV	PAU	IBS	MAR	AST	INT	ELÄ	NAP	EIF	PAR																						
1952	British Racing Motors	BRM Type 15	BRM P15 1.5 s/c V16														ALB; Ret	FRO	ULS							DMT; Ret	COM	NAT	BAU									
1952	Officine Alfieri Maserati	Maserati A6GCM	Maserati 2.0 L6																	MNZ; Ret	LAC	ESS	MAR	SAB	CAE					MOD; 2	CAD	SKA	MAD	AVU	JOE	NEW		
1953	Officine Alfieri Maserati	Maserati A6GCM	Maserati 2.0 L6	SYR	PAU	LAV	AST	BOR	INT	ELÄ	NAP; 3	ULS	WIN	FRO	COR	SNE	EIF																					
1953	British Racing Motors	BRM Type 15	BRM P15 1.5 s/c V16															ALB; 2	PRI	ESS	MID	ROU	CRY	AVU	USF	LAC	BRI	CHE	SAB	NEW	CAD	RED	SKA	LON	MOD	MAD	JOE	CUR
1954	Scuderia Ferrari	Ferrari 553	Ferrari 2.0 L4	SYR; Ret												ROU; Ret	CAE	AUG	COR	OUL	RED	PES	JOE	CAD	BER	GOO	DTT											
1954	Scuderia Ferrari	Ferrari 625	Ferrari 2.5 L4		PAU; Ret	LAV	BOR; 1	**INT**; 1^{1}	**BAR**; 1	CUR	ROM DNA	FRO	COR	BRC	CRY																							
1957	José Froilán González	Ferrari 625	Ferrari 2.5 L4	BUE; NC	SYR	GLV	NAP	RMS	CAE	INT	MOD	MOR																										

^{1}Gonzalez drove the 553 in the heat and the 625 in the final of the 1954 BRDC International Trophy.

=== Complete 24 Hours of Le Mans results ===
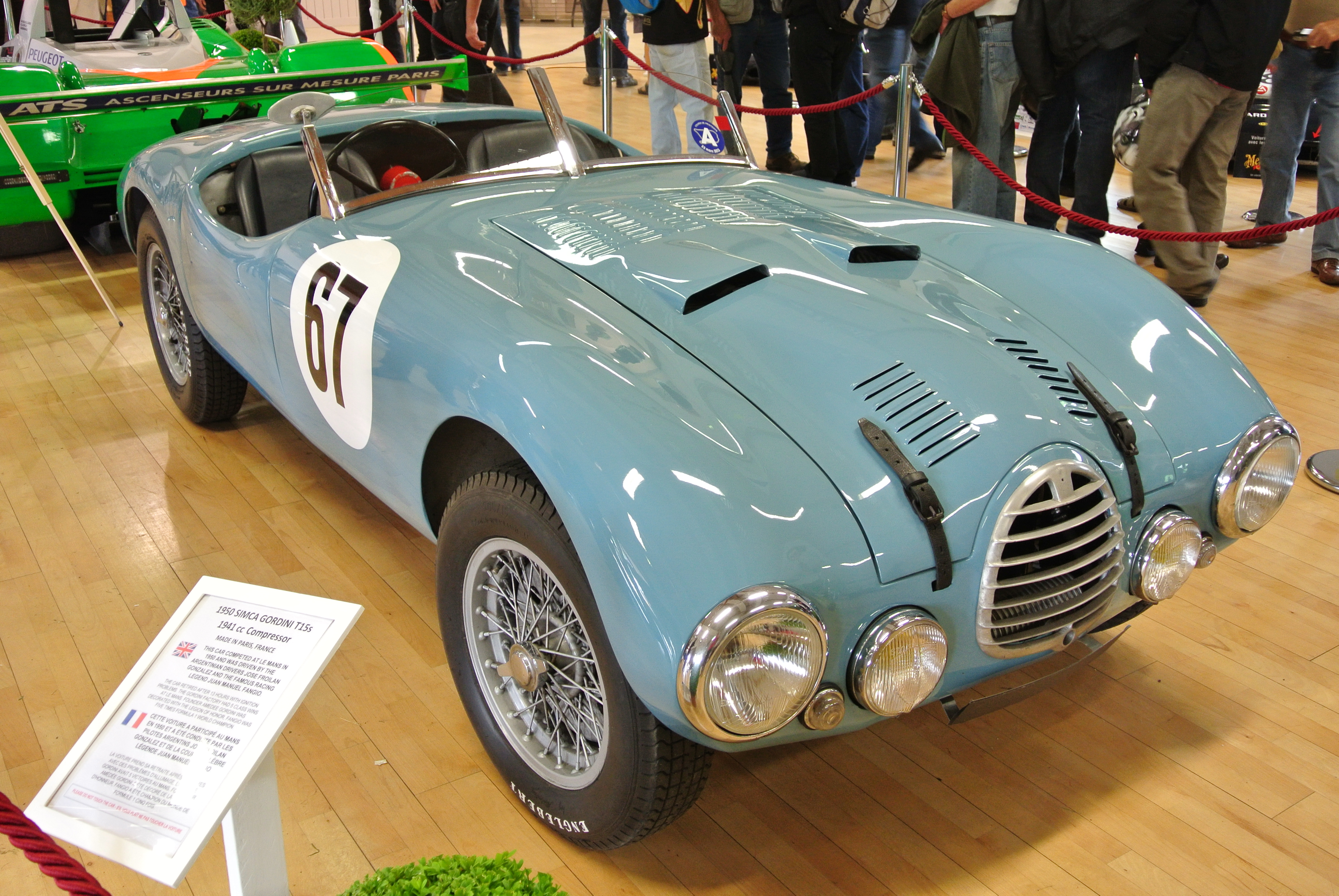
1950 Simca Gordini T15s, as raced, and retired, at the 1950 24 Hours of Le Mans by José Froilán González and Juan Manuel Fangio

Year	Team	Co-Drivers	Car	Class	Laps	Pos.	Class Pos.
1950	(France) Automobiles Gordini	(Argentina) Juan Manuel Fangio	Simca-Gordini T15S Compresseur	S 3.0	95	DNF (Engine)	
1951	(France) Henri Louveau	(Argentina) Onofre Marimón	Talbot-Lago T26 GS	S 5.0	128	DNF (Radiator)	
1953	(Italy) Scuderia Lancia	(Italy) Clemente Biondetti	Lancia D20 Compressor	S 8.0	213	DNF (Engine)	
1954	(Italy) Scuderia Ferrari	(France) Maurice Trintignant	Ferrari 375 Plus	S 5.0	302	**1st**	**1st**

=== Other race results ===
- Grand Prix of Interlagos: 3rd, (1952), Formula Libre
- Grand Prix of Rio de Janeiro 1st, (1952), Formula Libre
- Grand Prix of Buenos Aires 1st, (1951), Formula Libre
- Glover Trophy: 1st, (1952), Formula Libre
- Supercortemaggiore: 2nd, (1954)
- Monsanto Park Circuit: 1st, (1954)
- 1000 miles of Buenos Aires: 3rd, (1956), 1st (1960)
- 500 miles of Rafaela: 1st, (1958), 1st (1959)

== Notes ==
Sporting positions
Preceded by Tony Rolt; Duncan Hamilton	Winner of the 24 Hours of Le Mans; 1954; With: Maurice Trintignant	Succeeded by Mike Hawthorn; Ivor Bueb
Preceded by Mike Hawthorn	BRDC International Trophy; Winner; 1954	Succeeded by Peter Collins
Records
Preceded by Geoffrey Crossley; 29 years, 2 days (1950 British GP)	Youngest driver to start a Formula One race 27 years, 228 days (1950 Monaco Grand Prix)	Succeeded by Troy Ruttman; 20 years, 80 days (1950 Indianapolis 500)
Preceded by Manny Ayulo; 29 years, 221 days (1951 Indianapolis 500)	Youngest driver to score a podium position in Formula One; 28 years, 269 days (1951 French Grand Prix)	Succeeded by Troy Ruttman; 22 years, 80 days (1952 Indianapolis 500)
Preceded by Walt Faulkner; 30 years, 103 days (1950 Indianapolis 500)	Youngest Grand Prix polesitter 28 years, 282 days (1951 British Grand Prix)	Succeeded by Jerry Hoyt; 26 years, 121 days (1955 Indianapolis 500)
Preceded by Johnnie Parsons; 31 years, 330 days (1950 Indianapolis 500)	Youngest Grand Prix race winner 28 years, 282 days (1951 British Grand Prix)	Succeeded by Troy Ruttman; 22 years, 80 days (1952 Indianapolis 500)
Preceded by Johnnie Parsons; 31 years, 330 days (1950 Indianapolis 500)	Youngest driver to set fastest lap in Formula One; 29 years, 338 days (1952 Italian Grand Prix)	Succeeded by Hans Herrmann; 26 years, 131 days (1954 French GP)
Preceded by Alberto Ascari; 33 years, 107 days (1951 season)	Youngest Formula One; World Drivers' Championship runner-up 32 years, 19 days (1954 season)	Succeeded by Stirling Moss; 25 years, 302 days (1955 season)
