= List of Formula One circuits =

Locations of the circuits that hosted or are scheduled to host a Grand Prix. Nations on the current year's schedule are highlighted in green, with circuit locations marked in black. Former host nations are shown in dark grey. Former host circuits are marked with a white dot. De facto status of territories is shown.

Formula One (F1) is the highest class of single-seater motor racing defined by the Fédération Internationale de l'Automobile (FIA), motorsport's world governing body. The "formula" in the name refers to a set of rules to which all participants and vehicles must conform. The Formula One World Championship season consists of a series of races, known as Grands Prix, usually held on purpose-built circuits, and in a few cases on closed city streets. The results of each race are combined to determine two annual championships, one for drivers (World Drivers' Championship), and one for constructors (World Constructors' Championship).

This list is for the circuits that hosted World Championship races from 1950 until now.

== History ==
The first World Championship Grand Prix was held in 1950 at Silverstone; since then 78 circuits in total have hosted a Grand Prix. A lot of classic (older) circuits have hosted Grands Prix using different configurations throughout their history: Nürburgring, Spa-Francorchamps, Monza, etc. Taking Nürburgring as an example, the World Championship race there used the 22.835 km (14.189 mi) Nordschleife (Note: lit. 'North loop') configuration nine times, (Note: The only Formula One race to ever exceed this was the 1957 Pescara Grand Prix, held on a 25.579 km (15.894 mi) circuit.) ending after reigning world champion Niki Lauda's near-fatal accident in 1976, cementing concerns over safety that resulted in more recent Grands Prix using shorter, safer circuits. Formula One circuits were predominantly in Europe during the early years of the championship; as the sport has expanded, so has the location of its circuits. The expansion into Asia and America has been a recent occurrence. Of the 20 circuits that hosted a Grand Prix in 2012, nearly half were not on the calendar before 1999. The Autodromo Nazionale Monza has hosted the most World Championship races; the only season it did not host a race was in 1980, when the Italian Grand Prix was held at the Autodromo Enzo e Dino Ferrari. The Madring became the 78th circuit to host a Grand Prix, when it held the Spanish Grand Prix in 2026; this is the latest addition to this list. The longest circuit to have hosted a Grand Prix is the Pescara Circuit, which hosted the 1957 Pescara Grand Prix: the 25.800 km (16.031 mi) long circuit in Pescara, Italy, held the annual Coppa Acerbo race, and in 1957 it was the only time that this race was included as part of the World Championship, a race which Stirling Moss won.

As some circuits have hosted Grands Prix using different configurations, the most recent configuration used is listed in the table below.

== Circuits ==
Timeline

Key
*	Current circuits (for the 2026 season)	†	Future and returning circuits (for the 2027 season)

- The "Circuit" column uses the name contemporary to the last time the circuit was used in Formula One.
- The "Map" column shows a diagram of the latest configuration on current tracks and the last configuration used on past tracks.
- The "Type" column refers to the type of circuit: "street" is a circuit held on closed city streets, "road" refers to a mixture of public roads and a permanent track, and "race" is a permanent facility.
- The "Last length used" shows the track length for the configuration that was used last time the Formula One race was held on a given track.
- The "Direction" column shows the direction for the configuration that was used last time the Formula One race was held on a given track.
- The turns column shows the number of turns for the configuration that was used the last time a Formula One race was held on a given track.
- The table is accurate as of the 2026 Mexico City Grand Prix.

Formula One circuits
Circuit	Map	Type	Direction	Location	Country	Last length used	Turns	Grands Prix	Season(s)	Grands Prix held
Adelaide Street Circuit		Street circuit	Clockwise	Adelaide	Australia	3.780 km (2.349 mi)	16	Australian Grand Prix	1985–1995	11
Ain-Diab Circuit		Road circuit	Clockwise	Casablanca	Morocco	7.618 km (4.734 mi)	18	Moroccan Grand Prix	1958	1
Aintree Motor Racing Circuit		Road circuit	Clockwise	Aintree	United Kingdom	4.828 km (3.000 mi)	12	British Grand Prix	1955, 1957, 1959, 1961–1962	5
Albert Park Circuit *	Albert Park	Street circuit	Clockwise	Melbourne	Australia	5.278 km (3.280 mi)	16	Australian Grand Prix	1996–2019, 2022–2026	29
Algarve International Circuit†	Algarve	Race circuit	Clockwise	Portimão	Portugal	4.653 km (2.891 mi)	15	Portuguese Grand Prix	2020–2021	2
Autódromo do Estoril	Estoril	Race circuit	Clockwise	Estoril	Portugal	4.360 km (2.709 mi)	13	Portuguese Grand Prix	1984–1996	13
Autódromo Hermanos Rodríguez *		Race circuit	Clockwise	Mexico City	Mexico	4.304 km (2.674 mi)	17	Mexican Grand Prix, Mexico City Grand Prix	1963–1970, 1986–1992, 2015–2019, 2021–2026	26
Autódromo Internacional Nelson Piquet		Race circuit	Anti-clockwise	Rio de Janeiro	Brazil	5.031 km (3.126 mi)	11	Brazilian Grand Prix	1978, 1981–1989	10
Autodromo Internazionale del Mugello		Race circuit	Clockwise	Scarperia e San Piero	Italy	5.245 km (3.259 mi)	15	Tuscan Grand Prix	2020	1
Autodromo Internazionale Enzo e Dino Ferrari		Race circuit	Anti-clockwise	Imola	Italy	4.909 km (3.050 mi)	19	Italian Grand Prix, San Marino Grand Prix, Emilia Romagna Grand Prix	1980–2006, 2020–2022, 2024–2025	32
Autodromo José Carlos Pace *		Race circuit	Anti-clockwise	São Paulo	Brazil	4.309 km (2.677 mi)	15	Brazilian Grand Prix, São Paulo Grand Prix	1973–1977, 1979–1980, 1990–2019, 2021–2026	43
Autodromo Nazionale di Monza *		Race circuit	Clockwise	Monza	Italy	5.793 km (3.600 mi)	11	Italian Grand Prix	1950–1979, 1981–2026	76
Autódromo Oscar y Juan Gálvez		Race circuit	Clockwise Anti-clockwise (1954)	Buenos Aires	Argentina	4.259 km (2.646 mi)	18	Argentine Grand Prix	1953–1958, 1960, 1972–1975, 1977–1981, 1995–1998	20
AVUS		Road circuit	Anti-clockwise	Berlin	West Germany	8.300 km (5.157 mi)	4	German Grand Prix	1959	1
Bahrain International Circuit †	Bahrain	Race circuit	Clockwise	Sakhir	Bahrain	5.412 km (3.363 mi)	15	Bahrain Grand Prix, Sakhir Grand Prix	2004–2010, 2012–2025 (Note: Silverstone Circuit and the Bahrain International Circuit held two races each in 2020.)	22
Baku City Circuit *		Street circuit	Anti-clockwise	Baku	Azerbaijan	6.003 km (3.730 mi)	20	European Grand Prix, Azerbaijan Grand Prix	2016–2019, 2021–2026	10
Brands Hatch Circuit		Race circuit	Clockwise	West Kingsdown	United Kingdom	4.206 km (2.613 mi)	11	British Grand Prix, European Grand Prix	1964, 1966, 1968, 1970, 1972, 1974, 1976, 1978, 1980, 1982–1986	14
Buddh International Circuit		Race circuit	Clockwise	Greater Noida	India	5.141 km (3.194 mi)	16	Indian Grand Prix	2011–2013	3
Bugatti Circuit	Bugatti	Race circuit	Clockwise	Le Mans	France	4.430 km (2.753 mi)	8	French Grand Prix	1967	1
Caesars Palace Grand Prix Circuit		Street circuit	Anti-clockwise	Paradise	United States	3.650 km (2.268 mi)	14	Caesars Palace Grand Prix	1981–1982	2
Circuit Bremgarten		Road circuit	Clockwise	Bern	Switzerland	7.208 km (4.479 mi)	14	Swiss Grand Prix	1950–1954	5
Circuit de Barcelona-Catalunya *		Race circuit	Clockwise	Montmeló	Spain	4.657 km (2.894 mi)	14	Spanish Grand Prix; Barcelona-Catalunya Grand Prix	1991–2026	36
Circuit de Charade		Road circuit	Clockwise	Saint-Genès-Champanelle	France	8.055 km (5.005 mi)	38	French Grand Prix	1965, 1969–1970, 1972	4
Circuit de Monaco *		Street circuit	Clockwise	Monte Carlo	Monaco	3.337 km (2.074 mi)	19	Monaco Grand Prix	1950, 1955–2019, 2021–2026	72
Circuit de Nevers Magny-Cours		Race circuit	Clockwise	Magny-Cours	France	4.411 km (2.741 mi)	16	French Grand Prix	1991–2008	18
Circuit de Pedralbes		Street circuit	Clockwise	Barcelona	Spain	6.316 km (3.925 mi)	6	Spanish Grand Prix	1951, 1954	2
Circuit de Reims-Gueux		Road circuit	Clockwise	Gueux	France	8.302 km (5.159 mi)	6	French Grand Prix	1950–1951, 1953–1954, 1956, 1958–1961, 1963, 1966	11
Circuit de Spa-Francorchamps *		Race circuit	Clockwise	Stavelot	Belgium	7.004 km (4.352 mi)	20	Belgian Grand Prix	1950–1956, 1958, 1960–1968, 1970, 1983, 1985–2002, 2004–2005, 2007–2026	59
Circuit Dijon-Prenois		Race circuit	Clockwise	Prenois	France	3.886 km (2.415 mi)	12	French Grand Prix, Swiss Grand Prix	1974, 1977, 1979, 1981–1982, 1984	6
Circuit Gilles Villeneuve *		Street circuit	Clockwise	Montreal	Canada	4.361 km (2.710 mi)	14	Canadian Grand Prix	1978–1986, 1988–2008, 2010–2019, 2022–2026	45
Circuit Mont-Tremblant		Race circuit	Clockwise	Mont-Tremblant	Canada	4.265 km (2.650 mi)	15	Canadian Grand Prix	1968, 1970	2
Circuit of the Americas *		Race circuit	Anti-clockwise	Austin	United States	5.513 km (3.426 mi)	20	United States Grand Prix	2012–2019, 2021–2026	14
Circuit Paul Ricard		Race circuit	Clockwise	Le Castellet	France	5.842 km (3.630 mi)	15	French Grand Prix	1971, 1973, 1975–1976, 1978, 1980, 1982–1983, 1985–1990, 2018–2019, 2021–2022	18
Circuit Zandvoort *		Race circuit	Clockwise	Zandvoort	Netherlands	4.259 km (2.646 mi)	14	Dutch Grand Prix	1952–1953, 1955, 1958–1971, 1973–1985, 2021–2026	36
Circuit Zolder		Race circuit	Clockwise	Heusden-Zolder	Belgium	4.262 km (2.648 mi)	10	Belgian Grand Prix	1973, 1975–1982, 1984	10
Circuito da Boavista		Street circuit	Anti-clockwise	Porto	Portugal	7.775 km (4.831 mi)	15	Portuguese Grand Prix	1958, 1960	2
Circuito de Monsanto		Street circuit	Clockwise	Lisbon	Portugal	5.440 km (3.380 mi)	9	Portuguese Grand Prix	1959	1
Circuito Permanente de Jerez		Race circuit	Clockwise	Jerez de la Frontera	Spain	4.428 km (2.751 mi)	13	Spanish Grand Prix, European Grand Prix	1986–1990, 1994, 1997	7
Circuito Permanente del Jarama		Race circuit	Clockwise	San Sebastián de los Reyes	Spain	3.314 km (2.059 mi)	12	Spanish Grand Prix	1968, 1970, 1972, 1974, 1976–1979, 1981	9
Dallas Fair Park		Street circuit	Anti-clockwise	Dallas	United States	3.901 km (2.424 mi)	14	Dallas Grand Prix	1984	1
Detroit Street Circuit		Street circuit	Anti-clockwise	Detroit	United States	4.023 km (2.500 mi)	20	Detroit Grand Prix	1982–1988	7
Donington Park	Donington Park	Race circuit	Clockwise	Castle Donington	United Kingdom	4.020 km (2.498 mi)	11	European Grand Prix	1993	1
Fuji Speedway		Race circuit	Clockwise	Oyama	Japan	4.563 km (2.835 mi)	16	Japanese Grand Prix	1976–1977, 2007–2008	4
Hockenheimring		Race circuit	Clockwise	Hockenheim	Germany	4.574 km (2.842 mi)	16	German Grand Prix	1970, 1977–1984, 1986–2006, 2008, 2010, 2012, 2014, 2016, 2018–2019	37
Hungaroring *		Race circuit	Clockwise	Mogyoród	Hungary	4.381 km (2.722 mi)	14	Hungarian Grand Prix	1986–2026	41
Indianapolis Motor Speedway		Race circuit	Clockwise	Speedway	United States	4.192 km (2.605 mi)	13	Indianapolis 500 (Note: From 1950 to 1960, the Indianapolis 500 was part of the World Championship); United States Grand Prix	1950–1960, 2000–2007	19
Istanbul Park†		Race circuit	Anti-clockwise	Istanbul	Turkey	5.338 km (3.317 mi)	14	Turkish Grand Prix	2005–2011, 2020–2021	9
Jeddah Corniche Circuit †		Street circuit	Anti-clockwise	Jeddah	Saudi Arabia	6.174 km (3.836 mi)	27	Saudi Arabian Grand Prix	2021–2025	5
Korea International Circuit		Race circuit	Anti-clockwise	Yeongam	South Korea	5.615 km (3.489 mi)	18	Korean Grand Prix	2010–2013	4
Kyalami Grand Prix Circuit		Race circuit	Clockwise (1967–1985); Anti-clockwise (1992–1993)	Midrand	South Africa	4.261 km (2.648 mi)	13	South African Grand Prix	1967–1980, 1982–1985, 1992–1993	20
Las Vegas Strip Circuit *		Street circuit	Anti-clockwise	Paradise	United States	6.201 km (3.853 mi)	17	Las Vegas Grand Prix	2023–2025	3
Long Beach Street Circuit		Street circuit	Clockwise	Long Beach	United States	3.275 km (2.035 mi)	18	United States Grand Prix West	1976–1983	8
Lusail International Circuit *		Race circuit	Clockwise	Lusail	Qatar	5.419 km (3.367 mi)	16	Qatar Grand Prix	2021, 2023–2025	4
Madring *		Street circuit	Clockwise	Barajas	Spain	5.414 km (3.364 mi)	22	Spanish Grand Prix	2026	1
Marina Bay Street Circuit *		Street circuit	Anti-clockwise	Marina Bay	Singapore	4.940 km (3.070 mi)	19	Singapore Grand Prix	2008–2019, 2022–2026	17
Miami International Autodrome *		Street circuit	Anti-clockwise	Miami Gardens	United States	5.412 km (3.363 mi)	19	Miami Grand Prix	2022–2026	5
Montjuïc Circuit		Street circuit	Anti-clockwise	Barcelona	Spain	3.791 km (2.356 mi)	18	Spanish Grand Prix	1969, 1971, 1973, 1975	4
Mosport Park		Race circuit	Clockwise	Bowmanville	Canada	3.957 km (2.459 mi)	10	Canadian Grand Prix	1967, 1969, 1971–1974, 1976–1977	8
Nivelles-Baulers		Race circuit	Clockwise	Nivelles	Belgium	3.724 km (2.314 mi)	7	Belgian Grand Prix	1972, 1974	2
Nürburgring		Race circuit	Clockwise	Nürburg	Germany	5.148 km (3.199 mi)	15	German Grand Prix, European Grand Prix, Luxembourg Grand Prix, Eifel Grand Prix	1951–1954, 1956–1958, 1961–1969, 1971–1976, 1984–1985, 1995–2007, 2009, 2011, 2013, 2020	41
Pescara Circuit		Road circuit	Clockwise	Pescara	Italy	25.800 km (16.031 mi)	24*	Pescara Grand Prix	1957	1
Phoenix Street Circuit		Street circuit	Anti-clockwise	Phoenix	United States	3.720 km (2.312 mi)	12	United States Grand Prix	1989–1991	3
Prince George Circuit		Race circuit	Clockwise	East London	South Africa	3.920 km (2.436 mi)	8	South African Grand Prix	1962–1963, 1965	3
Red Bull Ring *		Race circuit	Clockwise	Spielberg	Austria	4.318 km (2.683 mi)	10	Austrian Grand Prix, Styrian Grand Prix	1970–1987, 1997–2003, 2014–2026 (Note: The Red Bull Ring held two races per season in both 2020 and 2021.)	40
Riverside International Raceway		Race circuit	Clockwise	Moreno Valley	United States	5.271 km (3.275 mi)	9	United States Grand Prix	1960	1
Rouen-Les-Essarts		Road circuit	Clockwise	Orival	France	6.542 km (4.065 mi)	13	French Grand Prix	1952, 1957, 1962, 1964, 1968	5
Scandinavian Raceway		Race circuit	Clockwise	Anderstorp	Sweden	4.031 km (2.505 mi)	8	Swedish Grand Prix	1973–1978	6
Sebring Raceway	Sebring International Raceway	Road circuit	Clockwise	Sebring	United States	8.356 km (5.192 mi)	12	United States Grand Prix	1959	1
Sepang International Circuit *		Race circuit	Clockwise	Sepang	Malaysia	5.543 km (3.444 mi)	15	Malaysian Grand Prix, Bahrain Grand Prix	1999–2017, 2026	20
Shanghai International Circuit *		Race circuit	Clockwise	Shanghai	China	5.451 km (3.387 mi)	16	Chinese Grand Prix	2004–2019, 2024–2026	19
Silverstone Circuit *		Race circuit	Clockwise	Silverstone	United Kingdom	5.891 km (3.660 mi)	18	British Grand Prix, 70th Anniversary Grand Prix	1950–1954, 1956, 1958, 1960, 1963, 1965, 1967, 1969, 1971, 1973, 1975, 1977, 1979, 1981, 1983, 1985, 1987–2026	61
Sochi Autodrom		Race circuit	Clockwise	Sochi	Russia	5.848 km (3.634 mi)	15	Russian Grand Prix	2014–2021	8
Suzuka International Racing Course *		Race circuit	Part clockwise and part anti-clockwise (figure of eight)	Suzuka	Japan	5.807 km (3.608 mi)	18	Japanese Grand Prix	1987–2006, 2009–2019, 2022–2026	36
TI Circuit Aida	Tanaka International Circuit	Race circuit	Clockwise	Mimasaka	Japan	3.703 km (2.301 mi)	11	Pacific Grand Prix	1994–1995	2
Valencia Street Circuit		Street circuit	Clockwise	Valencia	Spain	5.419 km (3.367 mi)	25	European Grand Prix	2008–2012	5
Watkins Glen International		Race circuit	Clockwise	Watkins Glen	United States	5.435 km (3.377 mi)	10	United States Grand Prix	1961–1980	20
Yas Marina Circuit *		Race circuit	Anti-clockwise	Abu Dhabi	United Arab Emirates	5.281 km (3.281 mi)	16	Abu Dhabi Grand Prix	2009–2025	17
Zeltweg Airfield		Road circuit	Clockwise	Zeltweg	Austria	3.186 km (1.980 mi)	4	Austrian Grand Prix	1964	1

== See also ==
- Lists of stadiums
- Lists of sports venues
