= Pescara (disambiguation) =

Pescara is a city in Italy.

Pescara may also refer to:

- Aterno-Pescara, a river in Italy
- Pescara Airport, an airport in Pescara
- Pescara Calcio, an Italian football (soccer) club
- Pescara Circuit, a race course near Pescara
- Pescara Grand Prix, a race held in Italy
- Province of Pescara, a province in Italy
- Raúl Pateras Pescara an Argentine helicopter pioneer
