= 1951 Pescara Grand Prix =

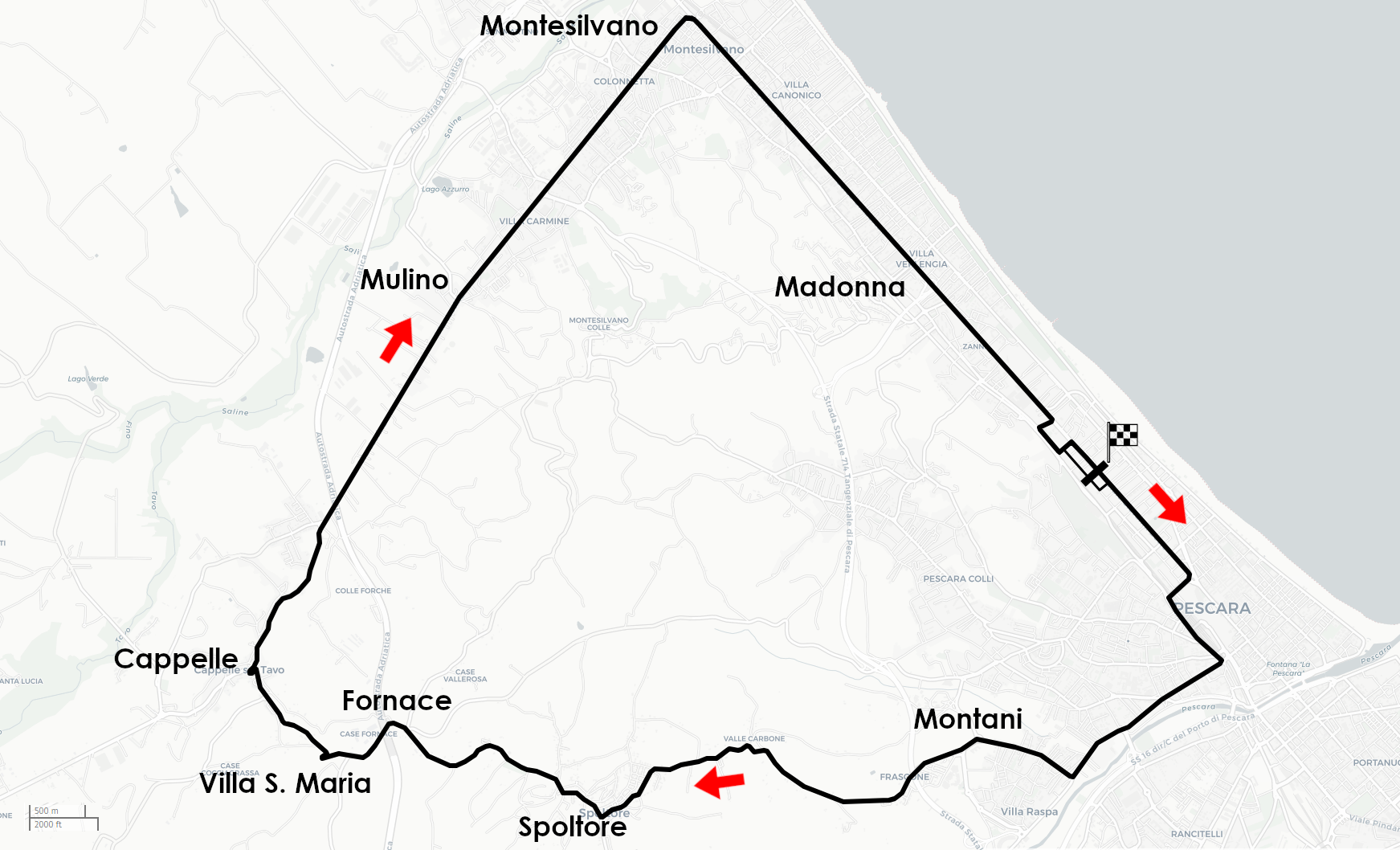

Race details
- Date: 15 August 1951
- Official name: XX Circuito di Pescara
- Location: Pescara Circuit
- Course: Temporary road course
- Course length: 25.836 km (16.107 miles)
- Distance: 12 laps, 310.03 km (193.28 miles)

Pole position
Driver	(Italy) Alberto Ascari	Ferrari
- Time: 10:43.6

Fastest lap
Driver	(Argentina) José Froilán González	Ferrari
- Time: 10:44.8

Podium
First	(Argentina) José Froilán González	Ferrari
Second	(France) Louis Rosier	Talbot-Lago
Third	(France) Philippe Étancelin	Talbot-Lago

The 20th Circuito di Pescara was a non-championship Formula One motor race, held on 15 August 1951, at the Pescara Circuit in Abruzzo, Italy. José Froilán González in a Ferrari 375 won and set fastest lap. Louis Rosier and Philippe Étancelin were second and third in their Talbot-Lago T26Cs. Alberto Ascari in another Ferrari 375 started from pole position but retired on the first lap; he took over teammate Luigi Villoresi's car but retired that car also.

== Results ==
Pos	No	Driver	Entrant	Car	Time/Retired	Grid
1	10	(Argentina) José Froilán González	Scuderia Ferrari	Ferrari 375	2:14:59.8, 137.71kph	4
2	26	(France) Louis Rosier	Ecurie Rosier	Talbot-Lago T26C	+7:20.8	5
3	8	(France) Philippe Étancelin	Philippe Étancelin	Talbot-Lago T26C	+9:10.2	6
4	16	(United Kingdom) Louis Chiron	Ecurie Rosier	Talbot-Lago T26C	+9:29.0	3
5	24	(United Kingdom) Peter Whitehead	Peter Whitehead	Ferrari 125	+1 lap	14
6	20	(Switzerland) Antonio Branca	Vicomtesse de Walckiers	Maserati 4CLT/48	+1 lap	10
7	12	(United States) Harry Schell	Enrico Plate	Maserati 4CLT/48	+1 lap	11
8	28	(United Kingdom) David Murray	Scuderia Ambrosiana	Ferrari 125	+2 laps	13
Ret	18	(France) Pierre Levegh	Pierre Levegh	Talbot-Lago T26C	6 laps	7
Ret	4	(France) Yves Giraud-Cabantous	Yves Giraud-Cabantous	Talbot-Lago T26C	6 laps, ignition	8
Ret	22	(Italy) Luigi Villoresi (Italy) Alberto Ascari	Scuderia Ferrari	Ferrari 375	4 laps, transmission	2
Ret	14	(Switzerland) Emmanuel de Graffenried	Enrico Plate	Maserati 4CLT/48	4 laps, gearbox	9
Ret	2	(France) Guy Mairesse	Ecurie Belge	Talbot-Lago T26C	2 laps, spark plugs	12
Ret	30	(Italy) Giovanni Bracco	Scuderia Guastalla	Ferrari 166C	0 laps, mechanical	15
Ret	6	(Italy) Alberto Ascari	Scuderia Ferrari	Ferrari 375	0 laps, oil pressure	1

Previous race: 1951 Albi Grand Prix	FIA Formula One World Championship; 1951 season	Next race: 1951 Bari Grand Prix
Previous race: 1950 Circuit of Pescara	Pescara Grand Prix	Next race: 1952 Circuit of Pescara
