= 1957 Formula One season =

11th season of FIA Formula One motor racing

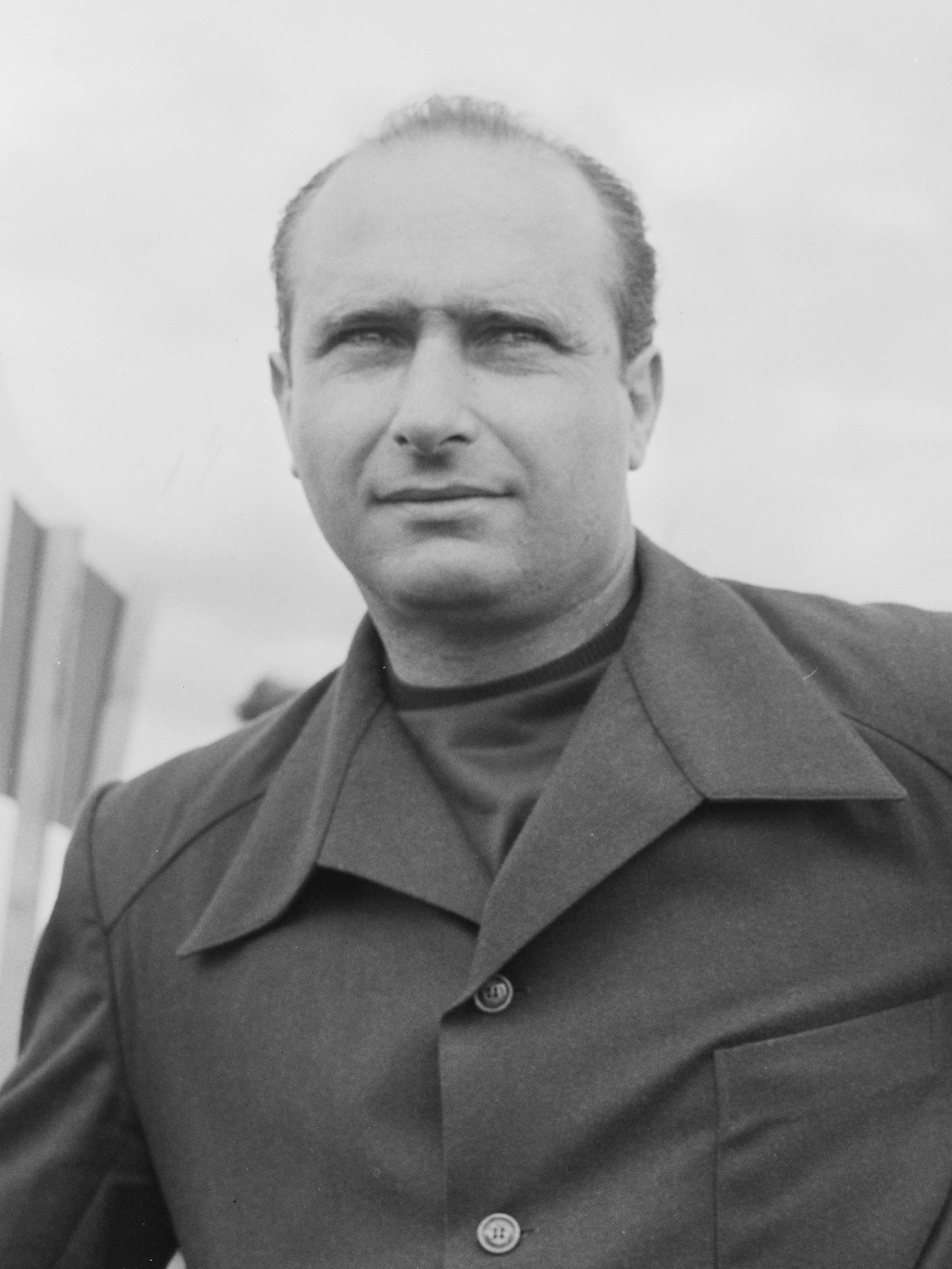
Juan Manuel Fangio driving for Maserati won a then record-extending fifth and final Drivers' Championship and his last of four consecutive.

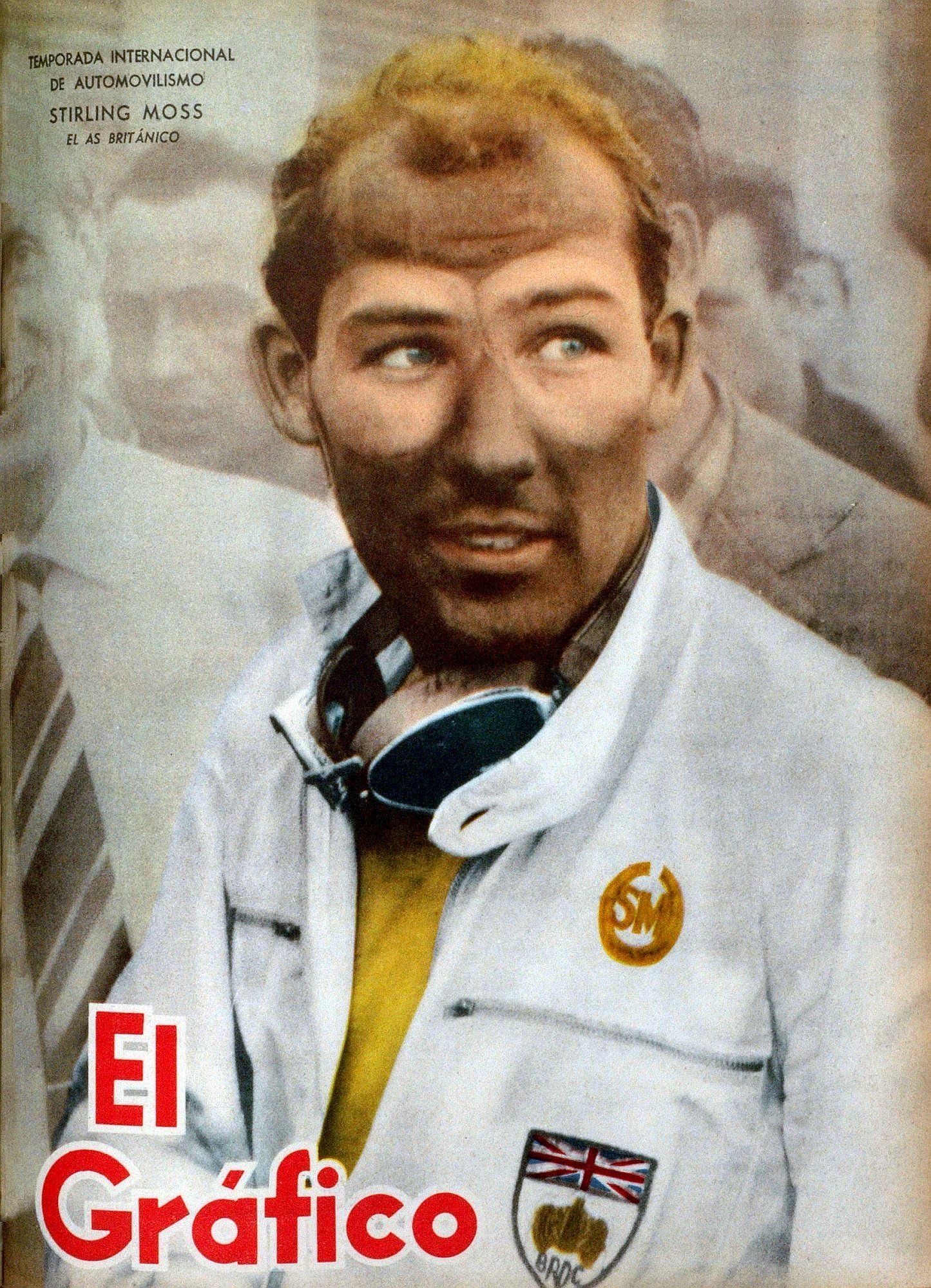
Stirling Moss finished runner-up in the World Championship of Drivers.

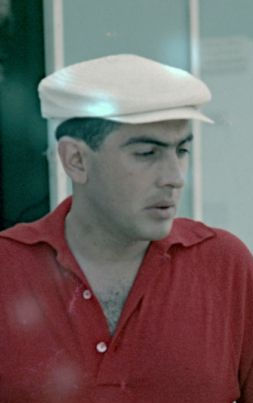
Luigi Musso finished third in the World Championship of Drivers.

The 1957 Formula One season was the 11th season of FIA Formula One motor racing. It featured the 8th World Championship of Drivers which was contested over eight races between 13 January and 8 September 1957. The season also included nine non-championship races for Formula One cars.

Juan Manuel Fangio driving for Maserati won his fourth consecutive championship. It was his fifth in total, a record that would not be beaten until Michael Schumacher in 2003. Especially in the latter half of the season, Stirling Moss was Fangio's main rival, but the Brit would finish runner-up for the third year in a row.

Excluding the Indianapolis 500, which counted towards the F1 championship although there was very little overlap in contestants, all races were won by cars powered by an engine built by the same constructor that also built the chassis. This would not happen again until 2006.

Three Formula One drivers lost their lives this year while racing in other categories. On 14 March, Ferrari driver Eugenio Castellotti suffered a fatal accident when he tested a new chassis for the team at Modena Autodrome. Trying to beat the lap record by Maserati's Jean Behra, he hit a chicane in a bad way and was thrown out of the car. A skull fracture caused his instant death. On 12 May, Ferrari lost another driver: Alfonso de Portago was competing in that year's Mille Miglia when his tire blew and his car spun into the crowd. De Portago was killed along with his co-driver and nine spectators. Herbert MacKay-Fraser made his debut with BRM in the French Grand Prix but was killed a week later in a sports car race at Reims-Gueux.

As of 2025 this was the last World Championship title for Pirelli tyres against competition.

== Teams and drivers ==
The following teams and drivers competed in the 1957 World Championship of Drivers. The list does not include those who only contested the Indianapolis 500.

Entrant	Constructor	Chassis	Engine	Tyre	Driver	Rounds
(Italy) Officine Alfieri Maserati	Maserati	250F	Maserati 250F1 2.5 L6; Maserati 250F1 2.5 V12	P	(Argentina) Juan Manuel Fangio	1–2, 4–8
(Italy) Officine Alfieri Maserati	Maserati	250F	Maserati 250F1 2.5 L6; Maserati 250F1 2.5 V12	P	(United Kingdom) Stirling Moss	1
(Italy) Officine Alfieri Maserati	Maserati	250F	Maserati 250F1 2.5 L6; Maserati 250F1 2.5 V12	P	(France) Jean Behra	1, 4–8
(Italy) Officine Alfieri Maserati	Maserati	250F	Maserati 250F1 2.5 L6; Maserati 250F1 2.5 V12	P	(Argentina) Carlos Menditeguy	1–2, 4–5
(Italy) Officine Alfieri Maserati	Maserati	250F	Maserati 250F1 2.5 L6; Maserati 250F1 2.5 V12	P	(Italy) Giorgio Scarlatti	2, 6–8
(Italy) Officine Alfieri Maserati	Maserati	250F	Maserati 250F1 2.5 L6; Maserati 250F1 2.5 V12	P	(United States) Harry Schell	2, 4–8
(Italy) Officine Alfieri Maserati	Maserati	250F	Maserati 250F1 2.5 L6; Maserati 250F1 2.5 V12	P	(West Germany) Hans Herrmann	2
(Italy) Scuderia Ferrari	Ferrari	801	Ferrari DS50 2.5 V8	E P	(United Kingdom) Peter Collins	1–2, 4–6, 8
(Italy) Scuderia Ferrari	Ferrari	801	Ferrari DS50 2.5 V8	E P	(Italy) Luigi Musso	1, 4–8
(Italy) Scuderia Ferrari	Ferrari	801	Ferrari DS50 2.5 V8	E P	(Italy) Eugenio Castellotti	1
(Italy) Scuderia Ferrari	Ferrari	801	Ferrari DS50 2.5 V8	E P	(United Kingdom) Mike Hawthorn	1–2, 4–6, 8
(Italy) Scuderia Ferrari	Ferrari	801	Ferrari DS50 2.5 V8	E P	(West Germany) Wolfgang von Trips	1–2, 8
(Italy) Scuderia Ferrari	Ferrari	801	Ferrari DS50 2.5 V8	E P	(Italy) Cesare Perdisa	1
(Italy) Scuderia Ferrari	Ferrari	801	Ferrari DS50 2.5 V8	E P	(Spain) Alfonso de Portago	1
(Italy) Scuderia Ferrari	Ferrari	801	Ferrari DS50 2.5 V8	E P	(Argentina) José Froilán González	1
(Italy) Scuderia Ferrari	Ferrari	801	Ferrari DS50 2.5 V8	E P	(France) Maurice Trintignant	2, 4–5
(Italy) Scuderia Centro Sud	Maserati	250F	Maserati 250F1 2.5 L6	P	(United States) Harry Schell	1
(Italy) Scuderia Centro Sud	Maserati	250F	Maserati 250F1 2.5 L6	P	(Sweden) Jo Bonnier	1, 7–8
(Italy) Scuderia Centro Sud	Maserati	250F	Maserati 250F1 2.5 L6	P	(United States) Masten Gregory	2, 6–8
(Italy) Scuderia Centro Sud	Maserati	250F	Maserati 250F1 2.5 L6	P	(France) André Simon	2
(Italy) Scuderia Centro Sud	Maserati	250F	Maserati 250F1 2.5 L6	P	(West Germany) Hans Herrmann	6
(Italy) Scuderia Centro Sud	Ferrari	500	Ferrari 625 2.5 L4	P	(Argentina) Alejandro de Tomaso	1
(Italy) Luigi Piotti	Maserati	250F	Maserati 250F1 2.5 L6	P	(Italy) Luigi Piotti	1–2, 7–8
(United Kingdom) Owen Racing Organisation	BRM	P25	BRM P25 2.5 L4	D	(United Kingdom) Ron Flockhart	2, 4
(United Kingdom) Owen Racing Organisation	BRM	P25	BRM P25 2.5 L4	D	(United Kingdom) Roy Salvadori	2
(United Kingdom) Owen Racing Organisation	BRM	P25	BRM P25 2.5 L4	D	(United States) Herbert MacKay-Fraser	4
(United Kingdom) Owen Racing Organisation	BRM	P25	BRM P25 2.5 L4	D	(United Kingdom) Jack Fairman	5
(United Kingdom) Owen Racing Organisation	BRM	P25	BRM P25 2.5 L4	D	(United Kingdom) Les Leston	5
(United Kingdom) Connaught Engineering	Connaught-Alta	B	Alta GP 2.5 L4	D	(United Kingdom) Stuart Lewis-Evans	2
(United Kingdom) Connaught Engineering	Connaught-Alta	B	Alta GP 2.5 L4	D	(United Kingdom) Ivor Bueb	2
(United Kingdom) Cooper Car Company	Cooper-Climax	T43	Climax FPF 2.0 L4	A D	(Australia) Jack Brabham	2, 4, 7
(United Kingdom) Cooper Car Company	Cooper-Climax	T43	Climax FPF 2.0 L4	A D	(United Kingdom) Les Leston	2
(United Kingdom) Cooper Car Company	Cooper-Climax	T43	Climax FPF 2.0 L4	A D	(United Kingdom) Mike MacDowel	4
(United Kingdom) Cooper Car Company	Cooper-Climax	T43	Climax FPF 2.0 L4	A D	(United Kingdom) Roy Salvadori	5, 7
(United Kingdom) Cooper Car Company	Cooper-Climax	T43	Climax FPF 1.5 L4	D	(United Kingdom) Roy Salvadori	6
(United Kingdom) Vandervell Products	Vanwall	VW 5	Vanwall 254 2.5 L4	P	(United Kingdom) Stirling Moss	2, 5–8
(United Kingdom) Vandervell Products	Vanwall	VW 5	Vanwall 254 2.5 L4	P	(United Kingdom) Tony Brooks	2, 5–8
(United Kingdom) Vandervell Products	Vanwall	VW 5	Vanwall 254 2.5 L4	P	(United Kingdom) Stuart Lewis-Evans	4–8
(United Kingdom) Vandervell Products	Vanwall	VW 5	Vanwall 254 2.5 L4	P	(United Kingdom) Roy Salvadori	4
(United Kingdom) H.H. Gould	Maserati	250F	Maserati 250F1 2.5 L6	D	(United Kingdom) Horace Gould	2, 4–8
(Sweden) Jo Bonnier	Maserati	250F	Maserati 250F1 2.5 L6	P	(Sweden) Jo Bonnier	5
(United Kingdom) Gilby Engineering	Maserati	250F	Maserati 250F1 2.5 L6	D	(United Kingdom) Ivor Bueb	5
(United Kingdom) R.R.C. Walker Racing Team	Cooper-Climax	T43	Climax FPF 2.0 L4	D	(Australia) Jack Brabham	5
(United Kingdom) R.R.C. Walker Racing Team	Cooper-Climax	T43	Climax FPF 1.5 L4	D	(Australia) Jack Brabham	6
(United Kingdom) Bob Gerard	Cooper-Bristol	T44	Bristol BS2 2.2 L6	D	(United Kingdom) Bob Gerard	5
(United Kingdom) Bruce Halford	Maserati	250F	Maserati 250F1 2.5 L6	D	(United Kingdom) Bruce Halford	6–8
(West Germany) Dr Ing F. Porsche KG	Porsche	RS550	Porsche 547/3 1.5 F4	?	(Italy) Umberto Maglioli	6
(West Germany) Dr Ing F. Porsche KG	Porsche	RS550	Porsche 547/3 1.5 F4	?	(West Germany) Edgar Barth	6
(United Kingdom) Ridgeway Management	Cooper-Climax	T43; T41	Climax FPF 1.5 L4; Climax FWB 1.5 L4	D	(United Kingdom) Tony Marsh	6
(United Kingdom) Ridgeway Management	Cooper-Climax	T43; T41	Climax FPF 1.5 L4; Climax FWB 1.5 L4	D	(Australia) Paul England	6
(Netherlands) Ecurie Maarsbergen	Porsche	RS550	Porsche 547/3 1.5 F4	D	(Netherlands) Carel Godin de Beaufort	6
(United Kingdom) J.B. Naylor	Cooper-Climax	T43	Climax FPF 1.5 L4	D	(United Kingdom) Brian Naylor	6
(United Kingdom) Dick Gibson	Cooper-Climax	T43	Climax FPF 1.5 L4	D	(United Kingdom) Dick Gibson	6
(Spain) Francisco Godia Sales	Maserati	250F	Maserati 250F1 2.5 L6	P	(Spain) Paco Godia	6–8
(Switzerland) Ottorino Volonterio	Maserati	250F	Maserati 250F1 2.5 L6	P	(Switzerland) Ottorino Volonterio	8
(Switzerland) Ottorino Volonterio	Maserati	250F	Maserati 250F1 2.5 L6	P	(France) André Simon	8

- Pink background denotes F2 entrants to the German Grand Prix

=== Team and driver changes ===
- After a year and a half at Mercedes and a season at Ferrari, reigning champion Juan Manuel Fangio returned to his 1953 team, Maserati.
- After introducing their first own chassis in the 1956 British Grand Prix, British Racing Motors entered three races in 1957, ahead of their first full-time season in 1958.
- Gordini withdrew from Formula One after 1956. Many of their drivers, most notably Robert Manzon, had been involved with the team for multiple years but would quit the sport as well.
- Scuderia Ferrari brought back one of their 1955 drivers, Mike Hawthorn.

==== Mid-season changes ====
- After the season opener in Argentina, Stirling Moss moved from Maserati to Vanwall, who had not competed in the first race. He was joined by Tony Brooks, in his first full season.
- Between the first and second race of the season, Ferrari driver Eugenio Castellotti suffered a fatal accident in testing. Teammate Cesare Perdisa retired from the sport in reaction to the loss. Just two months later, Ferrari lost another driver, Alfonso de Portago, when he crashed in that year's Mille Miglia. The team brought back one of their 1955 drivers, Maurice Trintignant.
- Ex-Vanwall driver Harry Schell joined Maserati from the second race on.
- From the French Grand Prix on, Stuart Lewis-Evans joined Vanwall.
- After a couple of entries in previous years, Cooper increased their operations to full-time during the season. They signed future champion Jack Brabham and ex-Gilby driver Roy Salvadori, among others.

== Calendar ==
Round	Grand Prix	Circuit	Date
1	Argentine Grand Prix	(Argentina) Autódromo Oscar Alfredo Gálvez, Buenos Aires	13 January
2	Monaco Grand Prix	Circuit de Monaco, Monte Carlo	19 May
3	Indianapolis 500	(United States) Indianapolis Motor Speedway, Speedway	30 May (Note: The Indianapolis 500 also counted towards the 1956 USAC Championship Car season, and was run for USAC Championship cars, but was not run to Formula One regulations.)
4	French Grand Prix	(France) Rouen-Les-Essarts, Orival	7 July
5	British Grand Prix	(United Kingdom) Aintree Motor Racing Circuit, Merseyside	20 July
6	German Grand Prix	(West Germany) Nürburgring, Nürburg	4 August
7	Pescara Grand Prix	(Italy) Pescara Circuit, Pescara	18 August
8	Italian Grand Prix	(Italy) Autodromo Nazionale di Monza, Monza	8 September

=== Calendar changes ===
- Three rounds on the provisional calendar were cancelled due to financial problems due to high fuel prices in the Suez Crisis: the Belgian Grand Prix on 2 June, the Dutch Grand Prix on 16 June and the Spanish Grand Prix on 20 October. The Dutch Grand Prix had been cancelled in 1956 as well. The Pescara Grand Prix was added to the 1957 calendar as a replacement.
- The French Grand Prix was moved from Reims-Gueux to Rouen-Les-Essarts for a year.
- The British Grand Prix was moved from Silverstone Circuit to Aintree Motor Racing Circuit, in keeping with the event-sharing arrangement between the two circuits.

== Championship report ==
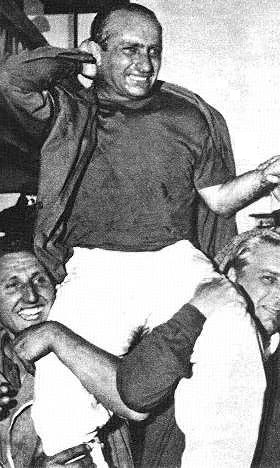
Juan Manuel Fangio won his 5th and final Drivers' Championship at the age of 46 years and 41 days driving for Maserati

Fangio chose to switch teams again, joining Maserati before the start of the season. The decision to switch proved to be a masterstroke, with Ferrari's line-up of Peter Collins, Eugenio Castellotti and the returning Mike Hawthorn failing to win a race. Castellotti and Alfonso de Portago were killed during the season (neither in Formula One crashes), making this a truly disastrous year for Ferrari.

The man Fangio replaced at Maserati, Stirling Moss, moved to Vanwall, a team beginning to fulfill their promise. Between them, Fangio and Moss won every championship race of the season except the Indianapolis 500, with Fangio taking four victories to Moss' three. Fangio's drive at the Nürburgring, where he overtook Collins and Hawthorn on the penultimate lap after a pit stop had put him nearly a minute behind, is regarded as a particularly notable one.

At the end of the year, it was announced Fangio would not return for another season. Maserati also pulled out, citing financial reasons. This was also the final year in which points were awarded for shared drives.

=== Race 1: Argentina ===
The first race of the season was in January at the Buenos Aires Autodrome in Argentina's capital city. Briton Moss took pole ahead of Fangio, Behra, and Ferrari drivers Castellotti, Collins, Musso, and Hawthorn. At the start of the race, Behra took the lead from Fangio and Castellotti. Moss was taken by surprise, and a juddering start damaged the throttle mechanism, and he pitted at the end of the first lap. While Moss sat in the pits, Castellotti led but was then overtaken by Behra. Soon afterwards, Collins worked his way to the front, but within a few laps, he was in trouble with his clutch and had to pit. This left Behra in the lead again, but Fangio soon passed him. Castelotti had lost his third position after a spin, so now Hawthorn was leading the charge, although both he and Musso would retire after a while with clutch problems. Castellotti remained the only challenge to the Maseratis at the front, but his race ended when a wheel fell off with 24 laps to go. Menditeguy and Schell were promoted to third and fourth when Castellotti went out, so Maserati started the season by romping home with a 1-2-3-4 result, with Fangio winning his 4th Argentine Grand Prix in a row ahead of Behra.

Argentina '57 would be Castellotti's last Grand Prix. He was killed testing a Ferrari at the Modena Aerodrome in March. A non-championship race was held in Syracuse on the southern Italian island of Sicily; Peter Collins won this race for Ferrari. The Pau Grand Prix, held on the city streets of the southwestern French town of Pau, was won by home favourite Behra in a Maserati, while on the same day, the Glover Trophy at the Goodwood circuit in southern England was won by Briton Stuart Lewis-Evans in a Connaught-Alta. Six days after these two events, Collins won the Naples Grand Prix. Another works Ferrari driver, Spaniard Alfonso de Portago, was killed in May while contesting the Mille Miglia sportscar race in Italy for Ferrari.

=== Race 2: Monaco ===
Four months after the Argentine round and several non-championship races, the teams assembled in Monaco for the second championship round of the season. Moss had joined Vanwall from Maserati, driving a car designed by Colin Chapman and financed by Tony Vandervell, a wealthy British industrialist, leaving Fangio as the undisputed team leader at Maserati. Fangio took pole position. However, Moss took the lead at the first corner with Fangio behind him, but on the second lap, Collins got ahead of the Argentine driver. Moss went off and crashed at the chicane on lap 4, and Collins swerved to avoid the crash and ended up hitting a stone wall. Fangio managed to get through without a problem, and Brooks braked hard only to be rammed from behind by Hawthorn. Only Brooks could keep going, but he was five seconds behind Fangio by the time he was up to speed again. Von Trips was third, with Menditeguy fourth and Schell fifth. Menditeguy would have to stop early for new tyres after hitting a curb, so Schell moved to fourth until his suspension broke. Brabham was next in the little Cooper with Trintignant chasing him, but the Frenchman soon dropped away with a stop to cure a misfire. After several retirements, Australian Jack Brabham was up to third, but a fuel pump failure left him to push the car to the line. He was classified sixth, and Fangio won again ahead of Brooks, Masten Gregory in a Maserati, Lewis-Evans, and Trintignant.

=== Race 4: France ===
The Indianapolis 500 was the 3rd round of the championship, but since that race was not run to Formula One rules, no competitors who raced in Formula One raced at the Indy 500, and vice versa. The Belgian and Dutch Grands Prix, scheduled for 2 and 16 June, were both cancelled because of disputes over money affected by the Suez Crisis in Egypt. This resulted in a six-week break between Monaco and the French GP, which was to be held at the Rouen-Les-Essarts public road circuit in northern France, extended from its previous layout used in 1952.

In practice, Fangio was fastest, with Behra and Musso alongside on the front row. Behind them were Schell and Collins, with the third row consisting of Salvadori, Hawthorn, and Trintignant. Behra went into the lead at the start, but Musso soon got ahead. Fangio followed in third, with Collins and Schell giving chase. Then came a fast-starting McKay-Fraser. Fangio worked his way past Behra on the second lap and took Musso for the lead on lap four. BRM suffered a setback when Flockhart seriously damaged his car in a high-speed accident, although he himself was not hurt. Collins worked his way past Behra, and the order remained unchanged at the front all the way to the flag, with Fangio winning from Musso and Collins. Behra slipped behind Hawthorn, allowing the Englishman to give the Lancia-Ferraris a 2-3-4 finish behind Fangio. McKay-Fraser's promising run ended with a transmission failure at one-third distance, but the American would not be seen again in Formula 1. He was to die a few days later in the annual Formula 2 race at the Reims public road circuit before the Reims Grand Prix, which Musso won in a Lancia-Ferrari.

=== Race 5: Britain ===
The British Grand Prix was held at the Aintree circuit in Liverpool instead of at the Silverstone circuit between London and Birmingham the previous year. The Aintree circuit was located in the middle of the horse-racing course where the famous Grand National was held. Both Vanwall drivers missed the French Grand Prix and were back in action for their home race. This was to be a landmark race for British motorsports. At the start of the race, Behra took off into the lead with Moss in hot pursuit, and the Englishman emerged ahead at the end of the lap, to the delight of the partisan crowd. Brooks was third, with Hawthorn fourth and Collins fifth. There were four British drivers in the top five positions. Then came Schell, Musso, and Fangio. Moss was able to build up his lead, but the car began to sound rough, and he pitted. Behra took the lead with Brooks behind him, but the second Vanwall driver was soon called into the pits to give his car to Moss, who re-joined in ninth position. He began to work his way through the field. Behra remained ahead, with Hawthorn unable to challenge him. Then came Lewis-Evans and Collins. Moss was quickly back up to fifth. The field was thinned out by a series of mechanical failures, including Fangio and Collins. Moss caught Lewis-Evans, but on lap 69, the whole race changed when Behra's clutch exploded. Hawthorn ran over some of the wreckage and suffered a puncture. Lewis-Evans took the lead but was passed almost immediately by Moss. The dream of a Vanwall 1–2 was punctured when Lewis-Evans suffered a broken throttle linkage which dropped him to seventh place. Moss duly won the race, Musso was second, with Hawthorn third. It was the third and final time that a Grand Prix had been won by two drivers in a shared car. This race was also noted as the first occasion that a British constructor won a World Drivers' Championship race, and from this season onwards British constructors won races in every season until 2013, except 2006.

The Caen Grand Prix, another important non-championship Formula One race held in the town of Caen in northern France (further west of Rouen), held between the British and German Grands Prix, was won by Behra in a BRM.

=== Race 6: Germany ===
At the Nürburgring in Germany, the field was as expected, with Lancia-Ferrari fielding Mike Hawthorn, Peter Collins, and Luigi Musso and Maserati running Juan Manuel Fangio, Jean Behra, and Harry Schell in their leading cars. The field was bolstered for the first time by Formula 2 machinery, which included a trio of Porsches and various Cooper-Climaxes; the length of the circuit allowed for these cars to run alongside each other.

Pole position went to Fangio, with Hawthorn, Behra, and Collins completing the front row. Then came Brooks, Schell, and Moss. At the start, Hawthorn and Collins went into a battle for the lead, with Fangio and Behra giving chase. On the third lap, Fangio passed Collins and soon took the lead. Collins then passed Hawthorn and chased after Fangio, but the Argentine driver was edging gradually away. A slow mid-race pit stop lasting 1 minute and 18 seconds (originally supposed to be 30 seconds) dropped Fangio one minute behind the two Lancia-Ferraris, but he chased back hard, broke the lap record ten times, and passed first Collins and then Hawthorn on the penultimate lap. Fangio thus won the race and his fifth World title.

=== Race 7: Pescara ===
The cancellation of the Belgian and Dutch Grands Prix earlier in the season enabled the FIA to include the Coppa Acerbo Pescara Grand Prix in the World Championship for the first time, although it had been contested since 1924. It was held during the 1930s Grand Prix days of Mercedes, Auto Union, and Alfa Romeo and continued as a non-championship race throughout the 1950s. The 25.6 kilometres (15.9 mi) public road circuit, the longest ever used for a Formula One race (even longer than the Nürburgring), was very dangerous. Practice was limited, and Enzo Ferrari did not bother to send cars for Mike Hawthorn and Peter Collins, partly because the World Championship had already been won by Juan Manuel Fangio and partly in protest against the Italian government's moves to ban road racing following Alfonso de Portago's accident earlier in the year in the Mille Miglia. Luigi Musso managed to convince Ferrari to lend him a car and entered the race as a privateer.

Maserati's Fangio set the fastest time in qualifying, with Stirling Moss second in his Vanwall. Musso was third. The second row of the 3-2-3 grid featured the Maseratis of Jean Behra and Harry Schell, while row three had Vanwall's Tony Brooks and Stuart Lewis-Evans split by the Scuderia Centro Sud Maserati of Masten Gregory.

The weather was hot, at the start, Musso took the lead. Maserati privateer Horace Gould hit a mechanic who was slow to get off the grid. Vanwall's challenge was blunted when Brooks retired with mechanical troubles on the first lap. Moss took the lead from Musso on lap two, but the two cars remained together. Fangio ran third, but the field thinned out quickly as the hot temperatures took their toll, with Lewis-Evans losing nearly a lap because of two tyre failures and Behra suffering an engine failure. On lap 10, Musso disappeared when his engine blew, the oil causing Fangio to have a spin which damaged one of his wheels. By the time Fangio re-joined, Moss was un-catchable. Moss's lead was even able to stop for a drink and to have his oil topped up, and he won the race ahead of Fangio. Schell finished third, with Gregory fourth and Lewis-Evans grabbing fifth at the end of the race from the fourth Maserati factory driver Giorgio Scarlatti. The Coppa Acerbo was never again used for a Formula One championship race; the race was last held in 1961 as a sportscar race.

=== Race 8: Italy ===
The Italian Grand Prix at Monza was held only on the road circuit without the poorly constructed concrete banking this year, as it had caused problems for the Italian constructors the year before. The track was very like the Monza of today, although without the chicanes. Ferrari was back in action for this most important of Italian races after boycotting Pescara. So it was a three-way fight between the Lancia-Ferraris, the Maseratis, and the Vanwalls. The British cars were strong, with pole position going to Stuart Lewis-Evans with Stirling Moss and Tony Brooks alongside him. Juan Manuel Fangio put his Maserati on the outside of the 4-3-4 grid while his teammates Jean Behra and Harry Schell shared row two with Peter Collins's Lancia-Ferrari. There were three more cars on row three with Wolfgang von Trips, Luigi Musso, and Mike Hawthorn alongside the Scuderia Centro Sud Maserati of Masten Gregory.

Although the Vanwalls went away from the grid at the front, Behra moved up to second on the first lap. Fangio attached himself to the train of cars ahead of him, and the five began to pull away from the rest of the field while indulging in a traditional Monza slipstreaming battle which saw the lead constantly changing between Moss and Behra. On lap seven, Fangio took the lead, but he was soon toppled in favour of Moss, Brooks, and then Lewis-Evans. On lap 20, Brooks dropped out of the fight with a sticking throttle. Then Lewis-Evans ran into trouble and pitted. This left Moss in the lead with Fangio and Behra behind him, although Behra would pit soon afterwards for new tyres. This moved Schell into third place, but he disappeared with an oil leak which meant that third was passed on to Collins. At two-thirds distance, Collins ran into engine trouble and pitted. This promoted Hawthorn to third, but a split fuel pipe dropped him to sixth in the closing laps, leaving third place to Von Trips.

=== Season conclusion ===
Three more non-championship races were held, all of which were won by Jean Behra. The BRDC International Trophy at Silverstone in England, Jean Behra won driving a BRM; the Modena Grand Prix at the Modena Aerodrome (where Eugenio Castellotti had been killed previously) and the Moroccan Grand Prix at the Ain-Diab public road circuit in Casablanca, both won in a Maserati.

All seven FIA-mandated championship races had been won by two drivers in 1957: Argentine Juan Manuel Fangio and Briton Stirling Moss. Although Moss took over an ill Tony Brooks's car during the British Grand Prix, he won with it on the road at that event.

== Results and standings ==
=== Grands Prix ===
Round	Grand Prix	Pole position	Fastest lap	Winning driver	Winning constructor	Report
1	(Argentina) Argentine Grand Prix	(United Kingdom) Stirling Moss	(United Kingdom) Stirling Moss	(Argentina) Juan Manuel Fangio	(Italy) Maserati	Report
2	Monaco Grand Prix	(Argentina) Juan Manuel Fangio	(Argentina) Juan Manuel Fangio	(Argentina) Juan Manuel Fangio	(Italy) Maserati	Report
3	(United States) Indianapolis 500	(United States) Pat O'Connor	(United States) Jim Rathmann	(United States) Sam Hanks	(United States) Salih-Offenhauser	Report
4	(France) French Grand Prix	(Argentina) Juan Manuel Fangio	(Italy) Luigi Musso	(Argentina) Juan Manuel Fangio	(Italy) Maserati	Report
5	(United Kingdom) British Grand Prix	(United Kingdom) Stirling Moss	(United Kingdom) Stirling Moss	(United Kingdom) Tony Brooks (United Kingdom) Stirling Moss	(United Kingdom) Vanwall	Report
6	(West Germany) German Grand Prix	(Argentina) Juan Manuel Fangio	(Argentina) Juan Manuel Fangio	(Argentina) Juan Manuel Fangio	(Italy) Maserati	Report
7	(Italy) Pescara Grand Prix	(Argentina) Juan Manuel Fangio	(United Kingdom) Stirling Moss	(United Kingdom) Stirling Moss	(United Kingdom) Vanwall	Report
8	(Italy) Italian Grand Prix	(United Kingdom) Stuart Lewis-Evans	(United Kingdom) Tony Brooks	(United Kingdom) Stirling Moss	(United Kingdom) Vanwall	Report

All Grand Prix races were run for Formula One cars, while the Indianapolis 500 was run for USAC National Championship cars and also counted towards the 1957 USAC Championship. The ongoing Suez Crisis, which affected oil tankers delivering oil to their respective countries, affected several countries, such as the Netherlands, Belgium, and Spain. These countries were to each have Grands Prix, but they were all cancelled because of the very high oil prices in those countries.

=== Scoring system ===
Points were awarded to the top five classified finishers, with an additional point awarded for setting the fastest lap, regardless of finishing position or even classification. Only the best five results counted towards the championship. Formula 2 cars competing in Grands Prix were not eligible for Championship points. Shared drives result in shared points for each driver if they finished in a points-scoring position, except if the driver was deemed to have completed "insufficient distance" in the finishing car (e.g. Peter Collins at the British Grand Prix). If more than one driver set the same fastest lap time, the fastest lap point would be divided equally between the drivers. Numbers without parentheses are championship points; numbers in parentheses are total points scored. Points were awarded in the following system:

Position	1st	2nd	3rd	4th	5th	FL
Race	8	6	4	3	2	1

=== World Championship of Drivers standings ===
Pos.	Driver	ARG (Argentina)	MON (Monaco)	500 (United States)	FRA (France)	GBR (United Kingdom)	GER (West Germany)	PES (Italy)	ITA (Italy)	Pts.
1	(Argentina) Juan Manuel Fangio	1	1^{P}^{F}		1^{P}	Ret	1^{P}^{F}	2^{P}	(2)	40 (46)
2	(United Kingdom) Stirling Moss	8^{P}^{F}	Ret			1† / Ret†^{P}^{F}	5	1^{F}	1	25
3	(Italy) Luigi Musso	Ret			2^{F}	2	4	Ret	8	16
4	(United Kingdom) Mike Hawthorn	Ret	Ret† / Ret		4	3	2		6	13
5	(United Kingdom) Tony Brooks		2			1† / Ret†	9	Ret	7^{F}	11
6	(United States) Masten Gregory		3				8	4	4	10
7	(United States) Harry Schell	4	Ret† / Ret		5	Ret	7	3	5† / Ret	10
8	(United States) Sam Hanks			1						8
9	(United Kingdom) Peter Collins	6† / Ret	Ret		3	Ret / 4†‡	3		Ret	8
10	(United States) Jim Rathmann			2^{F}						7
11	(France) Jean Behra	2			6	Ret	6	Ret	Ret	6
12	(United Kingdom) Stuart Lewis-Evans		4		Ret	7	Ret	5	Ret^{P}	5
13	(France) Maurice Trintignant		5		Ret	4†				5
14	(West Germany) Wolfgang von Trips	6†	Ret†						3	4
15	(Argentina) Carlos Menditeguy	3	Ret		Ret	Ret				4
16	(United States) Jimmy Bryan			3						4
17	(United States) Paul Russo			4						3
18	(United Kingdom) Roy Salvadori		DNQ		Ret	5	Ret^{1}	Ret		2
19	(United States) Andy Linden			5						2
20	(Italy) Giorgio Scarlatti		Ret†				10	6	5†	1
21	(Spain) Alfonso de Portago	5†								1
22	(Argentina) José Froilán González	5†								1
—	(Australia) Jack Brabham		6		7† / Ret	Ret	Ret^{1}	7		0
—	(United States) Johnny Boyd			6						0
—	(United Kingdom) Bob Gerard					6				0
—	(Italy) Cesare Perdisa	6†								0
—	(Sweden) Jo Bonnier	7				Ret		Ret	Ret	0
—	(United States) Marshall Teague			7						0
—	(United Kingdom) Mike MacDowel				7†					0
—	(United Kingdom) Ivor Bueb		Ret			8				0
—	(United States) Pat O'Connor			8^{P}						0
—	(Spain) Paco Godia						Ret	Ret	9	0
—	(Argentina) Alejandro de Tomaso	9								0
—	(United States) Bob Veith			9						0
—	(Italy) Luigi Piotti	10	DNQ					Ret	Ret	0
—	(United Kingdom) Horace Gould		Ret		Ret	DNS	Ret	Ret	10	0
—	(United States) Gene Hartley			10						0
—	(United Kingdom) Bruce Halford						11	Ret	Ret	0
—	(United States) Jack Turner			11						0
—	(Switzerland) Ottorino Volonterio								11†	0
—	(France) André Simon		DNQ						11†	0
—	(United States) Johnny Thomson			12						0
—	(United States) Bob Christie			13						0
—	(United States) Chuck Weyant			14						0
—	(United States) Tony Bettenhausen			15						0
—	(United States) Johnnie Parsons			16						0
—	(United States) Don Freeland			17						0
—	(United Kingdom) Ron Flockhart		Ret		Ret					0
—	(West Germany) Hans Herrmann		DNQ				Ret			0
—	(United Kingdom) Les Leston		DNQ			Ret				0
—	(Italy) Eugenio Castellotti	Ret								0
—	(United States) Jimmy Reece			Ret						0
—	(United States) Don Edmunds			Ret						0
—	(United States) Johnnie Tolan			Ret						0
—	(United States) Al Herman			Ret						0
—	(United States) Fred Agabashian			Ret						0
—	(United States) Eddie Sachs			Ret						0
—	(United States) Mike Magill			Ret						0
—	(United States) Eddie Johnson			Ret						0
—	(United States) Bill Cheesbourg			Ret						0
—	(United States) Al Keller			Ret						0
—	(United States) Jimmy Daywalt			Ret						0
—	(United States) Ed Elisian			Ret						0
—	(United States) Rodger Ward			Ret						0
—	(United States) Troy Ruttman			Ret						0
—	(United States) Eddie Russo			Ret						0
—	(United States) Elmer George			Ret						0
—	(United States) Herbert MacKay-Fraser				Ret					0
—	(United Kingdom) Jack Fairman					Ret				0
Drivers ineligible for Formula One points because they drove with Formula Two cars
—	(West Germany) Edgar Barth						12			
—	(United Kingdom) Brian Naylor						13			
—	(Netherlands) Carel Godin de Beaufort						14			
—	(United Kingdom) Tony Marsh						15			
—	(Italy) Umberto Maglioli						Ret			
—	(Australia) Paul England						Ret			
—	(United Kingdom) Dick Gibson						Ret			
Pos.	Driver	ARG (Argentina)	MON (Monaco)	500 (United States)	FRA (France)	GBR (United Kingdom)	GER (West Germany)	PES (Italy)	ITA (Italy)	Pts.

Key
Colour	Result
Gold	Winner
Silver	Second place
Bronze	Third place
Green	Other points position
Blue	Other classified position
Blue	Not classified, finished (NC)
Purple	Not classified, retired (Ret)
Red	Did not qualify (DNQ)
Black	Disqualified (DSQ)
White	Did not start (DNS)
White	Race cancelled (C)
Blank	Did not practice (DNP)
Blank	Excluded (EX)
Blank	Did not arrive (DNA)
Blank	Withdrawn (WD)
Blank	Did not enter (empty cell)
Annotation	Meaning
P	Pole position
F	Fastest lap

- † Position shared between multiple drivers of the same car.
- ‡ Too few laps driven to receive points.
- Only the best five results counted towards the championship. Numbers without parentheses are championship points; numbers in parentheses are total points scored.
- ^{1} – Ineligible for Formula One points because he drove a Formula Two car.

== Non-championship races ==
The following Formula One races, also held in 1957, did not count towards the World Championship of Drivers.

Race name	Circuit	Date	Winning driver	Constructor	Report
(Italy) VII Gran Premio di Siracusa	Syracuse	7 April	(United Kingdom) Peter Collins	(Italy) Lancia-Ferrari	Report
(France) XVII Pau Grand Prix	Pau	22 April	(France) Jean Behra	(Italy) Maserati	Report
(United Kingdom) V Glover Trophy	Goodwood	22 April	(United Kingdom) Stuart Lewis-Evans	(United Kingdom) Connaught-Alta	Report
(Italy) X Gran Premio di Napoli	Posillipo	28 April	(United Kingdom) Peter Collins	(Italy) Lancia-Ferrari	Report
(France) II Grand Prix de Reims	Reims	14 July	(Italy) Luigi Musso	(Italy) Lancia-Ferrari	Report
(France) V Grand Prix de Caen	Caen	28 July	(France) Jean Behra	(United Kingdom) BRM	Report
(United Kingdom) IX BRDC International Trophy	Silverstone	14 September	(France) Jean Behra	(United Kingdom) BRM	Report
(Italy) V Gran Premio di Modena	Modena	22 September	(France) Jean Behra	(Italy) Maserati	Report
(Morocco) VI Grand Prix de Maroc	Ain-Diab	27 October	(France) Jean Behra	(Italy) Maserati	Report
