= 1954 Pescara Grand Prix =

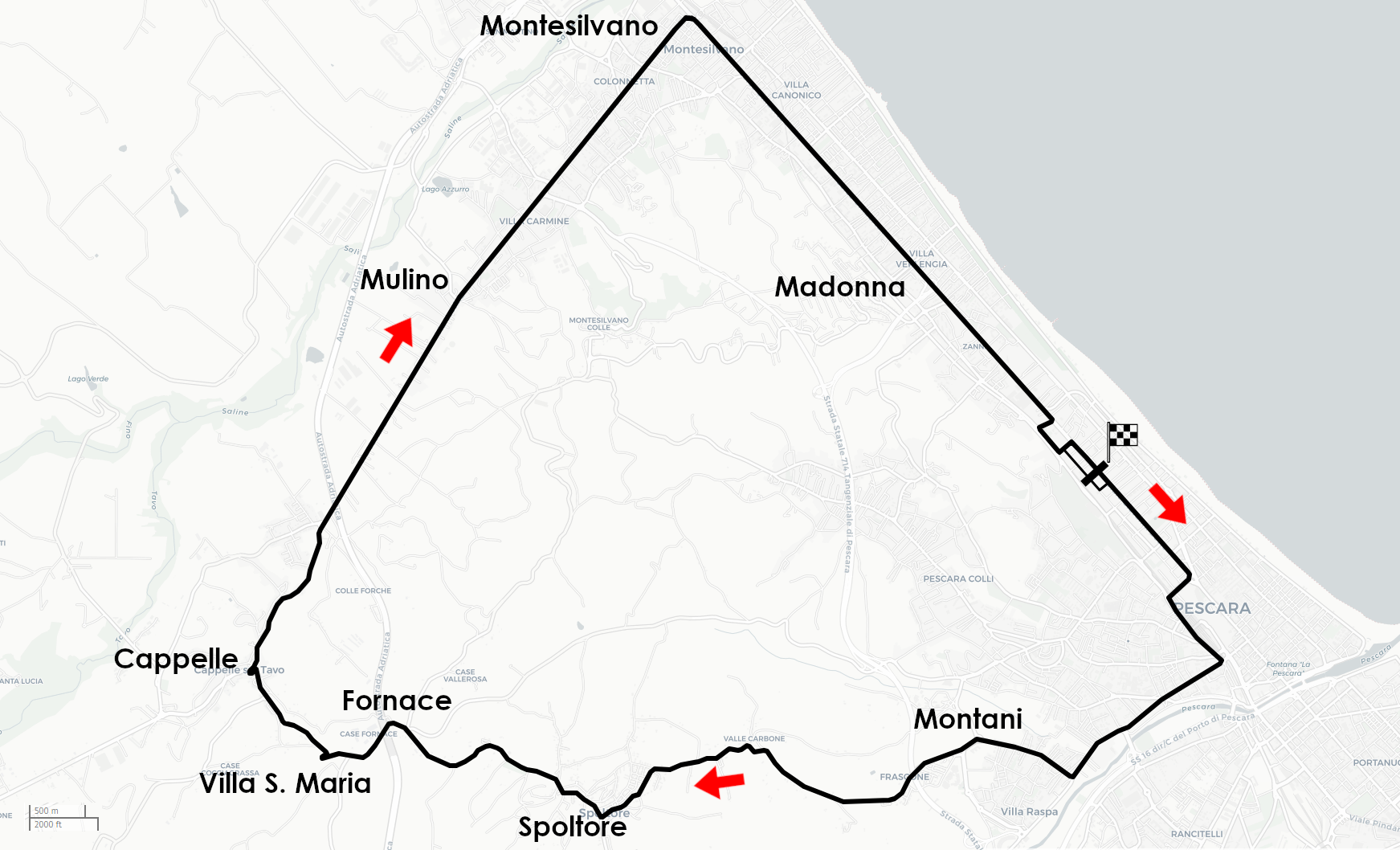

Race details
- Date: 15 August 1954
- Official name: XXIII Circuito di Pescara
- Location: Pescara Circuit
- Course: Temporary road course
- Course length: 25.60 km (15.96 miles)
- Distance: 16 laps, 409.60 km (255.36 miles)

Pole position
Driver	(United Kingdom) Stirling Moss	Maserati
- Time: 10:23.0

Fastest lap
Driver	(Thailand) B. Bira	Maserati
- Time: 10:46.39

Podium
First	(Italy) Luigi Musso	Maserati
Second	(Thailand) B. Bira	Maserati
Third	(United States) Harry Schell	Maserati

The 23rd Circuito di Pescara was a Formula One motor race, held on 15 August 1954, at the Pescara Circuit in Abruzzo, Italy. Luigi Musso in a Maserati 250F scored his first Formula 1 victory. B. Bira (Maserati 250F) and Harry Schell (Maserati A6GCM) were second and third, with Bira setting fastest lap. Stirling Moss in yet another 250F started from pole position but retired after 3 laps with a broken oil pipe.

== Results ==
Pos	No	Driver	Entrant	Car	Time/Retired	Grid
1	8	(Italy) Luigi Musso	Officine Alfieri Maserati	Maserati 250F	2:55:54.51, 139.15kph	5
2	20	(Thailand) B. Bira	Prince Bira	Maserati 250F	+2:57.05	9
3	24	(United States) Harry Schell	Harry Schell	Maserati A6GCM	+6:48.29	8
4	26	(Argentina) Jorge Daponte	J. Daponte	Maserati A6GCM	+1 lap	12
5	16	(France) Jean Behra	Equipe Gordini	Gordini Type 16	+2 laps	4
6	2	(Argentina) Clemar Bucci	Equipe Gordini	Gordini Type 16	+6 laps	3
Ret		(France) Louis Rosier	Equipe Rosier	Ferrari 500	9 laps	7
Ret	18	(United Kingdom) Stirling Moss	Officine Alfieri Maserati	Maserati 250F	3 laps, oil pipe	1
Ret	14	(Italy) Berardo Taraschi	B. Taraschi	Ferrari 166	3 laps, mechanical	11
Ret		(Belgium) Jacques Swaters	Ecurie Francorchamps	Ferrari 500	2 laps, mechanical	13
Ret		(France) André Guelfi	Equipe Gordini	Gordini Type 16	1 lap, fire	10
Ret		(France) Robert Manzon	Equipe Rosier	Ferrari 625	1 lap, engine	2
DNS		(Italy) Umberto Maglioli	Scuderia Ferrari	Ferrari 553		6
DNA		(Italy) Sergio Mantovani	Officine Alfieri Maserati	Maserati 250F		
DNA		(Argentina) Roberto Mieres	R. Mieres	Maserati 250F		

Previous race: 1954 RedeX Trophy	FIA Formula One World Championship; 1954 season	Next race: 1954 Joe Fry Memorial Trophy
Previous race: 1953 Pescara Grand Prix	Pescara Grand Prix	Next race: 1956 Pescara Grand Prix
