= Vincenzo Auricchio =

Italian racing driver

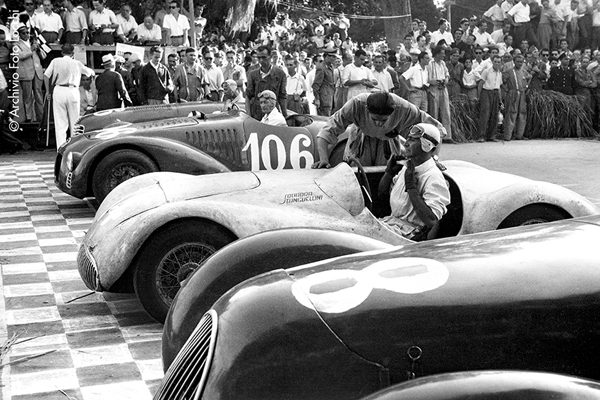
Some cars at Circuito delle Cascine (Firenze) on 20 July 1947. (incomplete)Entry #106 was the 1947 Ferrari 125 S s/n 01C driven by Ferdinando Righetti. On his right (farthest away) may be Franco Cortese in what would be Ferrari s/n 02C. The nearest is entry #8, but unclear who this is. Judging by the oval grille it looks like an Alfa Romeo 8C and could be either Fabbrini or Balestrero. The remaining car (with two persons) looks like a Stanguellini S1100 s/n CS01101 and may/must be Vincenzo Auricchio who had the entry #114 and got to 2nd place.

Vincenzo Auricchio (1 May 1916 – 12 July 1970) was an Italian racing driver who won the 1947 Italian Championship (Coppa Acerbo).

He was born in 1916, just outside of Naples in San Giuseppe Vesuviano. His parents were of the Auricchio cheese manufacturing family that had started in this town, relocating to Cremona in northern Italy in the 1930s. His uncle Gennaro Auricchio (1914–2007) was also into car racing for Alfa Romeo.

After the end of World War II, Vincenzo debuted and won the 1947 Coppa Acerbo in a Stanguellini-Fiat 1100 car. Until his retirement in 1957, he took part in eight of the Mille Miglias, the best in 1949 when he came in fourth with Piero Bozzini.

He died in a sports boating accident on Lake Como in 1970.
