= 1950 Coppa Acerbo =

- Non-championship race in the 1950 Formula One season

Race details
- Date: 15 August 1950
- Official name: XIX Coppa Acerbo
- Location: Pescara, Abruzzo, Italy
- Course: Pescara Circuit
- Course length: 25.802 km (16.030 miles)
- Distance: 16 laps, 412.826 km (256.518 miles)

Pole position
Driver	(Argentina) Juan Manuel Fangio	Alfa Romeo
- Time: 10:37.6

Fastest lap
Driver	(Argentina) Juan Manuel Fangio	Alfa Romeo
- Time: 10:37.6

Podium
First	(Argentina) Juan Manuel Fangio	Alfa Romeo
Second	(France) Louis Rosier	Talbot-Lago
Third	(Italy) Luigi Fagioli	Alfa Romeo

The 1950 Coppa Acerbo (also known as the 1950 Pescara Grand Prix) was a non-championship Formula One motor race held on 15 August 1950 at the Pescara Circuit, in Italy.

== Classification ==
=== Qualifying ===
Pos	No	Driver	Manufacturer	Time	Gap
1		(Argentina) Juan Manuel Fangio	Alfa Romeo	10'37.6	-
2		(Italy) Luigi Fagioli	Alfa Romeo	10'58.0	+20.4
3		(France) Louis Rosier	Talbot-Lago	11'26.0	+48.4
4		(France) Henri Louveau	Talbot-Lago	11'32.6	+55.0
5		(France) Philippe Étançelin	Talbot-Lago	11'42.4	+1'4.8
6		(France) Georges Grignard	Talbot-Lago	12'17.8	+1'40.2
7		(France) Pierre Levegh	Talbot-Lago	12'23.2	+1'45.6
8		(Thailand) Prince Bira	Maserati	13'14.2	+2'36.6
9		(Italy) Luigi de Filippis	Maserati	14'06.8	+3'29.2
10		(Italy) Franco Rol	Maserati	14'53.8	+4'16.2
11		(Italy) Franco Comotti	Maserati-Milano	20'43.2	+10'5.6
12		(Italy) Felice Bonetto	Maserati	21'02.4	+10'24.8
13		(Switzerland) Emmanuel de Graffenried	Maserati	No time	
14		(Italy) Clemente Biondetti	Ferrari-Jaguar	No time	
15		(Argentina) Adolfo Schwelm Cruz	Jaguar	No time	

=== Race ===
Pos	No	Driver	Manufacturer	Laps	Time/Retired	Grid
1		(Argentina) Juan Manuel Fangio	Alfa Romeo	16	3:02:51.4	1
2		(France) Louis Rosier	Talbot-Lago	16	+ 17.6	3
3		(Italy) Luigi Fagioli	Alfa Romeo	16	+ 23.6	2
4		(France) Philippe Étançelin	Talbot-Lago	16	+ 6:49.0	5
5		(France) Pierre Levegh	Talbot-Lago	15	+ 1 lap	7
6		(Italy) Luigi de Filippis	Maserati	14	+ 2 laps	9
7		(Italy) Felice Bonetto	Maserati	10	+ 6 laps	12
Ret		(Thailand) Prince Bira	Maserati	2	Mechanical	8
Ret		(France) Georges Grignard	Talbot-Lago	1	Accident	6
Ret		(France) Henri Louveau	Talbot-Lago	1	Fuel pipe	4
Ret		(Italy) Franco Rol	Maserati	0	Supercharger	10
Ret		(Switzerland) Emmanuel de Graffenried	Maserati	0		13
Ret		(Argentina) Adolfo Schwelm Cruz	Jaguar	0		15
Ret		(Italy) Clemente Biondetti	Ferrari-Jaguar	0		14
DNS		(Italy) Franco Comotti	Maserati-Milano	0		11

Previous race: 1950 Ulster Trophy	Formula One non-championship races 1950 season	Next race: 1950 Sheffield Telegraph Trophy
Previous race: 1949 Coppa Acerbo	Coppa Acerbo	Next race: 1951 Coppa Acerbo
