= Coppa Acerbo =

Automobile race held in Italy (1924–1961)

Coppa Acerbo / Circuito di Pescara
- Pescara Circuit
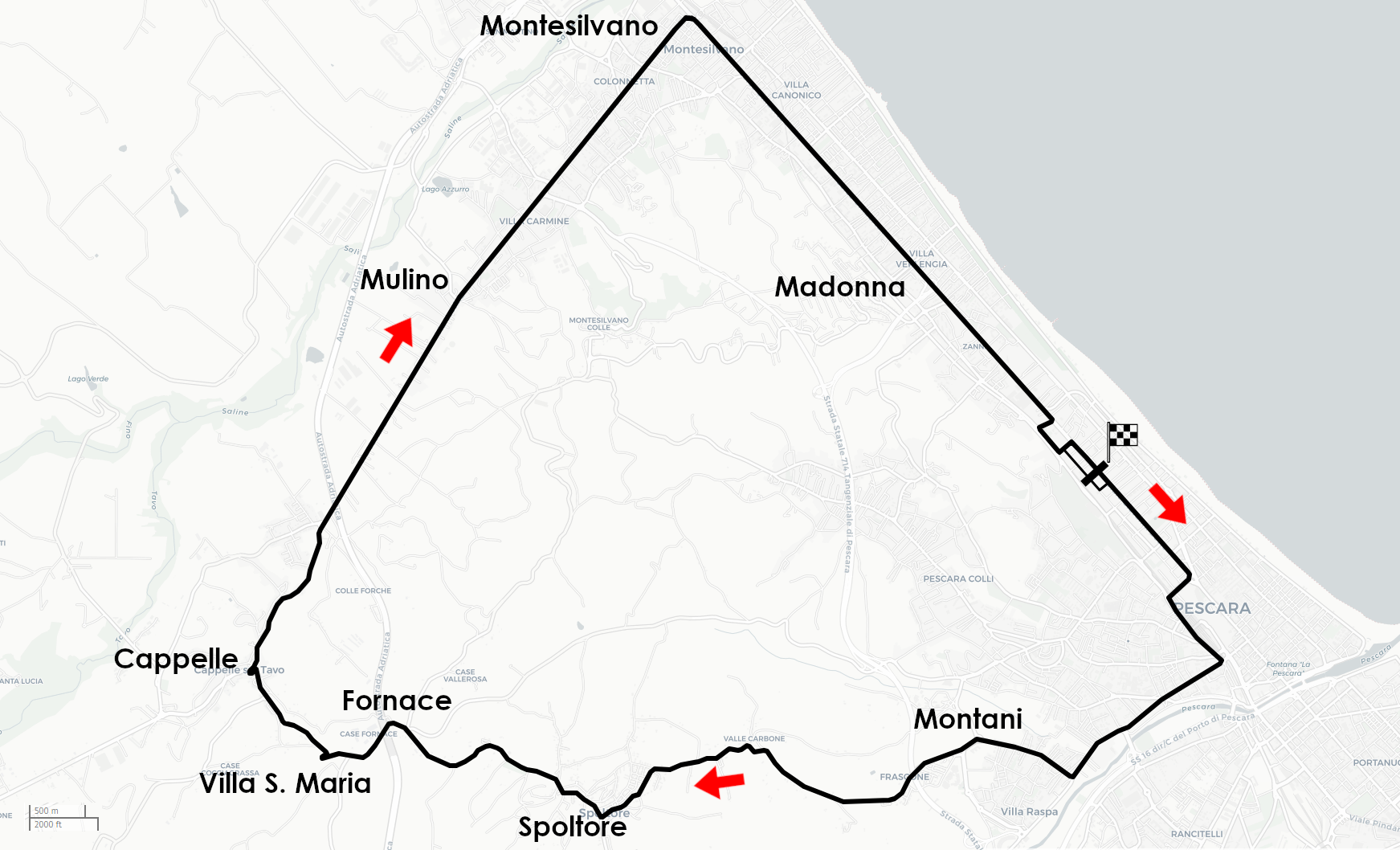

Race information
- Number of times held: 27
- First held: 1924
- Last held: 1961
- Most wins (drivers): (Italy) Giuseppe Campari (3)
- Most wins (constructors): (Italy) Alfa Romeo (10)
- Circuit length: 25.579 km (15.894 miles)
- Race length: 460.42 km (286.09 miles)
- Laps: 18

Last race (1957)

Pole position
- (Argentina) Juan Manuel Fangio; Maserati; 9:44.6

Podium
- 1. (United Kingdom) Stirling Moss; Vanwall; 2:59:22.7; 2. (Argentina) Juan Manuel Fangio; Maserati; +3:13.9; 3. (United States) Harry Schell; Maserati; +6:46.8

Fastest lap
- (United Kingdom) Stirling Moss; Vanwall; 9:44.6

The Coppa Acerbo was an automobile race held in Italy, named after Tito Acerbo, the brother of Giacomo Acerbo, a prominent fascist politician. Following Italy's defeat in World War II, and the consequent demise of fascism, the race was renamed the Circuito di Pescara, and in some years was also referred to as the Pescara Grand Prix (Gran Premio di Pescara) and 12 Hours of Pescara (12 Ore di Pescara). The race was run between 1924 and 1961 and over the years was held to a variety of vehicle class regulations and durations. In 1957 the Pescara Grand Prix formed a round of the Formula One World Championship, a race which still holds the record as having the longest circuit length ever used for a Championship event.

== Pescara Circuit ==
The Coppa Acerbo races were held over a 24–26 km (15–16 mi) circuit, beginning and ending at Pescara, on the Adriatic coast. The course layout featured an inland route through the Abruzzo hills, that passed through several villages, followed by a long, straight descent back to the coast, where a tight right-hand corner led on to a four-mile (6 km) long straight running next to the sea. The pit and paddock complex was located at the end of this straight. In an effort to slow competitor speeds past these pits the Pescara circuit became one of the first to have an artificial chicane installed, just before the pit lane. The Pescara circuit layout holds the record as the longest circuit to ever to host a Formula One World Championship event, albeit only once in 1957, while the Nürburgring Nordschleife, coming second at about 22.8 km, was used many times until 1976.

== Pre-war races ==
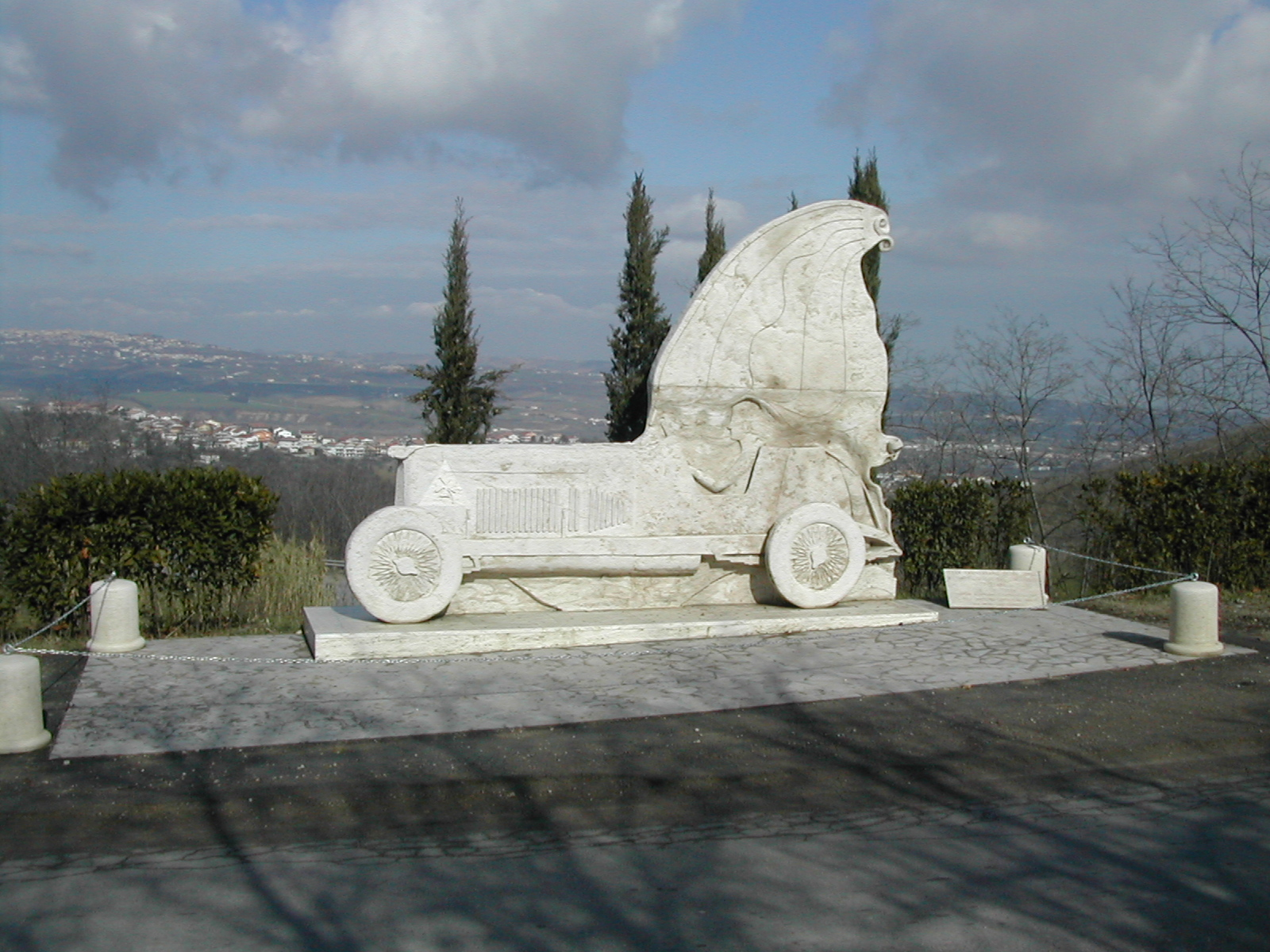
A sculpture, placed between the villages of Cappelle sul Tavo and Spoltore at the highest point on the Pescara Circuit, commemorating the pre-war Coppa Acerbo racers.

The first Coppa Acerbo was staged in 1924 and was won by Enzo Ferrari. It was Ferrari's fourth and final grand prix victory before he retired to create Ferrari and become head of the Formula One team Scuderia Ferrari. The race was run for the top class of international competition, the only real limiting factor on vehicle specifications being the cars' ability to transmit power through the inadequate tyres of the day. Although never itself a Grande Epreuve, or later a constituent of the European Championship, the Coppa Acerbo was considered one of the most prestigious races of its day. These early races were dominated by home-grown cars and drivers, and Alfa Romeo in particular was almost unbeatable. The Milanese manufacturer won seven of the first nine editions; only in 1926 were they beaten by the Bugatti T35, and again in 1930 by Italian star-driver Achille Varzi driving a Maserati.

Alfa's domination of the race came to an end with the introduction of the 750 kg Grand Prix regulations in 1934, a race that was also marked by tragedy when Guy Moll, one of the most promising young drivers of the day, was killed. Germany's state-funded Silver Arrows of Mercedes-Benz and Auto Union would come to eclipse all their rivals for the subsequent five years. Although the race was again won by two Italian drivers during this time, including a second victory for Varzi, it was only when the organisers decided to run the Coppa to the 1.5 litre voiturette formula in 1939 that any other manufacturer could stand a realistic chance of winning. Perhaps fittingly it was Alfa Romeo, with their new 158 Alfetta car, that took the honours in this last competition before the outbreak of World War II. In 1939 a "Coppa Acerbo Song" (with music by maestro Ignazio Civera and lyrics by Franzi) was published.

== Post-war races ==
After WWII the race remained suspended for a year during post-war rebuilding. When it was finally run again in 1947 the name of the race was changed, because of its fascist connections, and it became known as the Circuito di Pescara. For the first three years the race was run for two-seater sports cars and was a fairly minor constituent in the European racing calendar. However, in common with many race organisers around the continent, with the introduction of the Formula One World Championship in 1950 the race organisers saw their chance to return the Pescara event to its former position of prominence. Although, once again, not a World Championship event the race did attract many top-name teams and drivers over the following two years. Despite it being an Italian event, and himself a former winner, Ferrari decided to withdraw his team from the 1950 event, but the Alfa Romeo, Maserati and Talbot-Lago works teams did attend, along with many privateer and amateur racers. The 1950 race was won by future World Champion Juan Manuel Fangio driving for Alfa Romeo. The following year Ferrari did attend, and the race was won by Fangio's Argentinian compatriot José Froilán González driving one of their 375 cars.

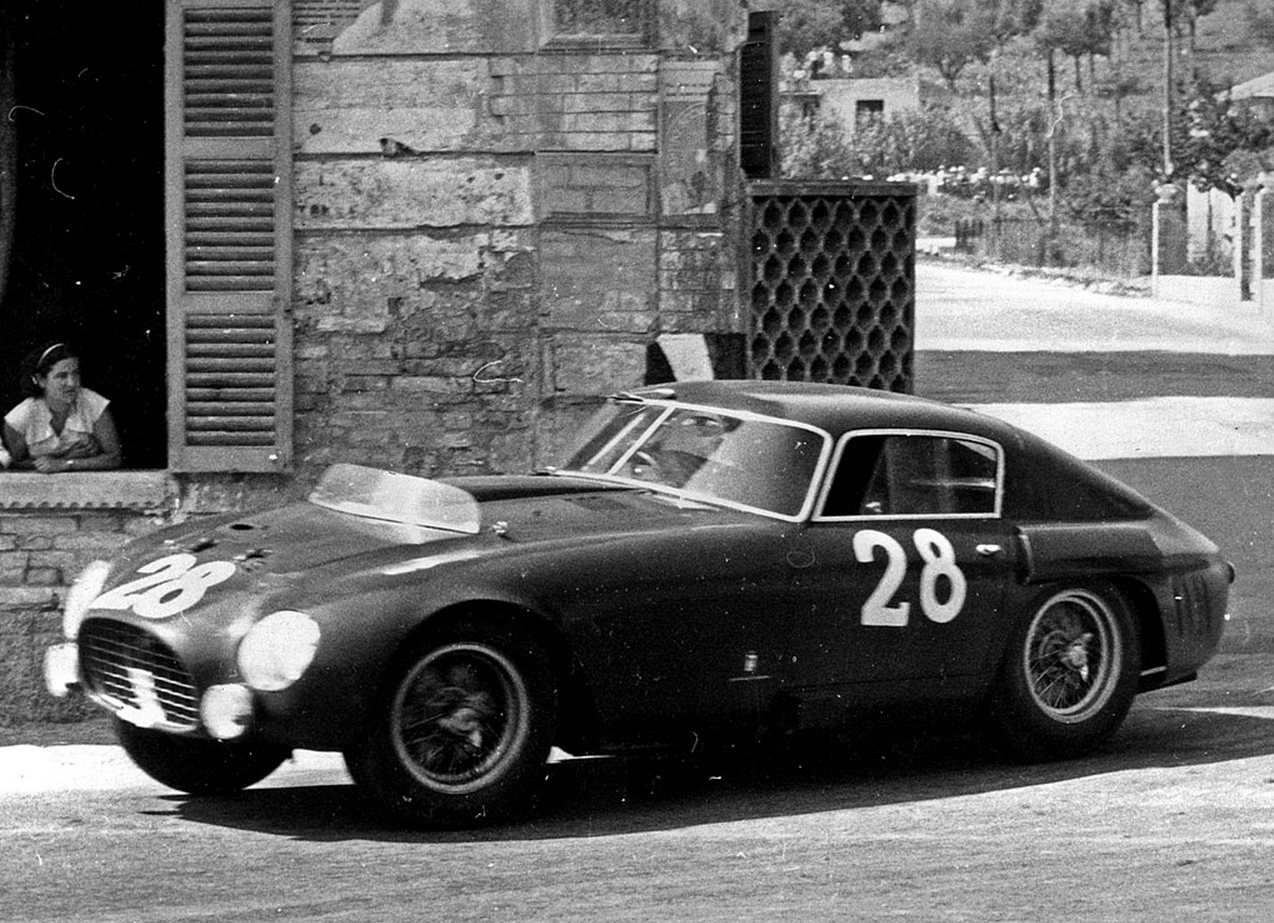
Mike Hawthorn and Umberto Maglioli won the 1953 race in Ferrari 375 MM #0320AM.

When the World Championship switched to the slower Formula Two regulations, the organisers decided to abandon formula racing in favour of further sportscar events. During this period endurance sportscar racing was almost as prestigious as the top open-wheel series, and for 1952 the organisers changed the race's name, once again, to the 12 Ore di Pescara (12 Hours of Pescara). The change of format did not hinder Ferrari's chances of victory, however, and their cars and drivers took wins in both 1952 and 1953. Despite the success of the endurance format, though, when the Formula One engine capacity limit was raised to 2.5 litres from 1954 the Circuito di Pescara was quickly switched back to single-seat rules. The 1954 event was won by one of the most iconic Formula One cars of all time, a Maserati 250F, driven by Luigi Musso. This was to be the last race for two years, as in 1955, as a result of the disaster at the 24 hours of Le Mans, the race was cancelled. Sportscars returned once more in 1956.

The 1957 Pescara Grand Prix, held on 18 August 1957, was the seventh, and penultimate round of the 1957 World Drivers' Championship. The race, which was the only Formula One World Championship race at the track, is best remembered for being held at the longest ever circuit to stage a Formula One World Championship Grand Prix. It was also the first of the two consecutive Italian races, and after the subsequent race at Monza was complete, it became the first time that two Formula One races had been held in the same country in the same year. In a field dominated by numerous Maserati 250F cars, reigning World Champion Fangio used his example to set a pole position time of 9 minutes 44.6 seconds, at an average speed of over 157 km/h (98 mph). In the race, however, it was second-placed starter Stirling Moss in his Vanwall who took the initiative and victory. He led all but one of the race's 18 laps and finished over three minutes clear of Fangio in second place.

By the early 1960s, safety issues had become a major concern and the Pescara racecourse was seen as too dangerous for major international events. After a two-year break the race was downgraded to Formula Two status for 1960, a race won by future World Champion Denny Hulme in his first year racing in Europe. For its 1961 swansong once again, for only the second time in its history, the Pescara race was raised to World Championship status, this time in the World Sportscar Championship. Appropriately, for a race subtitled the 4h Testa Rossa, the final Gran Premio di Pescara was won by a Ferrari Testa Rossa, driven by Lorenzo Bandini and Giorgio Scarlatti and entered by Scuderia Centro Sud; an Italian team, with an Italian car and two Italian drivers, won the final iteration of this famous Italian event. With ever-increasing speeds and the fragile build-quality of most cars of the time, the race was discontinued after the 1961 event.

== Race winners ==
=== By year ===
A pink background indicates an event which was not part of the Formula One World Championship.

Year	Driver(s)	Class	Vehicle	Race title
1924	(Italy) Enzo Ferrari	Grand Prix	Alfa Romeo RL TF	I Coppa Acerbo
1925	(Italy) Guido Ginaldi	Grand Prix	Alfa Romeo RL TF	II Coppa Acerbo
1926	(Italy) Luigi Spinozzi	Grand Prix	Bugatti T35	III Coppa Acerbo
1927	(Italy) Giuseppe Campari	Grand Prix	Alfa Romeo P2	IV Coppa Acerbo
1928	(Italy) Giuseppe Campari	Grand Prix	Alfa Romeo P2	V Coppa Acerbo
1929	Not held			
1930	(Italy) Achille Varzi	Grand Prix	Maserati 26M	VI Coppa Acerbo
1931	(Italy) Giuseppe Campari	Grand Prix	Alfa Romeo Tipo A	VII Coppa Acerbo
1932	(Italy) Tazio Nuvolari	Grand Prix	Alfa Romeo Tipo-B 'P3'	VIII Coppa Acerbo
1933	(Italy) Luigi Fagioli	Grand Prix	Alfa Romeo Tipo-B 'P3'	IX Coppa Acerbo
1934	(Italy) Luigi Fagioli	Grand Prix	Mercedes-Benz W25	X Coppa Acerbo
1935	(Italy) Achille Varzi	Grand Prix	Auto Union B Typ.	XI Coppa Acerbo
1936	(Germany) Bernd Rosemeyer	Grand Prix	Auto Union C Typ.	XII Coppa Acerbo
1937	(Germany) Bernd Rosemeyer	Grand Prix	Auto Union C Typ.	XIII Coppa Acerbo
1938	(Germany) Rudolf Caracciola	Grand Prix	Mercedes-Benz W154	XIV Coppa Acerbo
1939	(Italy) Clemente Biondetti	Voiturette	Alfa Romeo 158	XV Coppa Acerbo
1940 – 1946	Not held due to World War II			
1947	(Italy) Vincenzo Auricchio	Sports car	Stanguellini-Fiat 1100	XVI Circuito di Pescara
1948	(Italy) Giovanni Bracco (Italy) Alberto Ascari	Sports car	Maserati A6GCS	XVII Circuito di Pescara
1949	(Italy) Franco Rol	Sports car	Alfa Romeo 6C 2500 SS	XVIII Circuito di Pescara
1950	(Argentina) Juan Manuel Fangio	Formula One	Alfa Romeo 158	XIX Circuito di Pescara
1951	(Argentina) José Froilán González	Formula One	Ferrari 375	XX Circuito di Pescara
1952	(Italy) Giovanni Bracco (Italy) Paolo Marzotto	Sports car	Ferrari 250 S	1° 12 Ore di Pescara
1953	(Italy) Umberto Maglioli (United Kingdom) Mike Hawthorn	Sports car	Ferrari 375 MM	2° 12 Ore di Pescara
1954	(Italy) Luigi Musso	Formula One/Two	Maserati 250F	XXIII Gran Premio di Pescara
1955	Not held due to 1955 Le Mans disaster			
1956	(France) Robert Manzon	Sports car	Gordini T15S	XXIV Gran Premio di Pescara
1957	(United Kingdom) Stirling Moss	Formula One	Vanwall VW5	XXV Circuito di Pescara
1958 – 1959	Not held			
1960	(New Zealand) Denny Hulme	Formula Junior	Cooper T52 - BMC	XXVI Gran Premio di Pescara
1961	(Italy) Lorenzo Bandini (Italy) Giorgio Scarlatti	Sports car	Ferrari 250 TRI	1961 4h Testa Rosa

=== Repeat winners (drivers) ===
A pink background indicates an event which was not part of the Formula One World Championship.

Wins	Driver	Years won
3	(Italy) Giuseppe Campari	1927, 1928, 1931
2	(Italy) Luigi Fagioli	1933, 1934
2	(Italy) Achille Varzi	1930, 1935
2	(Germany) Bernd Rosemeyer	1936, 1937
2	(Italy) Giovanni Bracco	1948, 1952

=== Repeat winners (constructors) ===
A pink background indicates an event which was not part of the Formula One World Championship.

Wins	Constructor	Years won
10	(Italy) Alfa Romeo	1924, 1925, 1927, 1928, 1931, 1932, 1933, 1939, 1949, 1950
4	(Italy) Ferrari	1951, 1952, 1953, 1961
3	(Germany) Auto Union	1935, 1936, 1937
3	(Italy) Maserati	1930, 1948, 1954
2	(Germany) Mercedes-Benz	1934, 1938

=== Repeat winners (engine manufacturers) ===
A pink background indicates an event which was not part of the Formula One World Championship.

Wins	Manufacturer	Years won
10	(Italy) Alfa Romeo	1924, 1925, 1927, 1928, 1931, 1932, 1933, 1939, 1949, 1950
4	(Italy) Ferrari	1951, 1952, 1953, 1961
3	(Germany) Auto Union	1935, 1936, 1937
3	(Italy) Maserati	1930, 1948, 1954
2	(Germany) Mercedes-Benz	1934, 1938

== See also ==
- Coppa Ciano
- List of major automobile races in Italy
