= 1957 Pescara Grand Prix =

← Previous race	Next race →
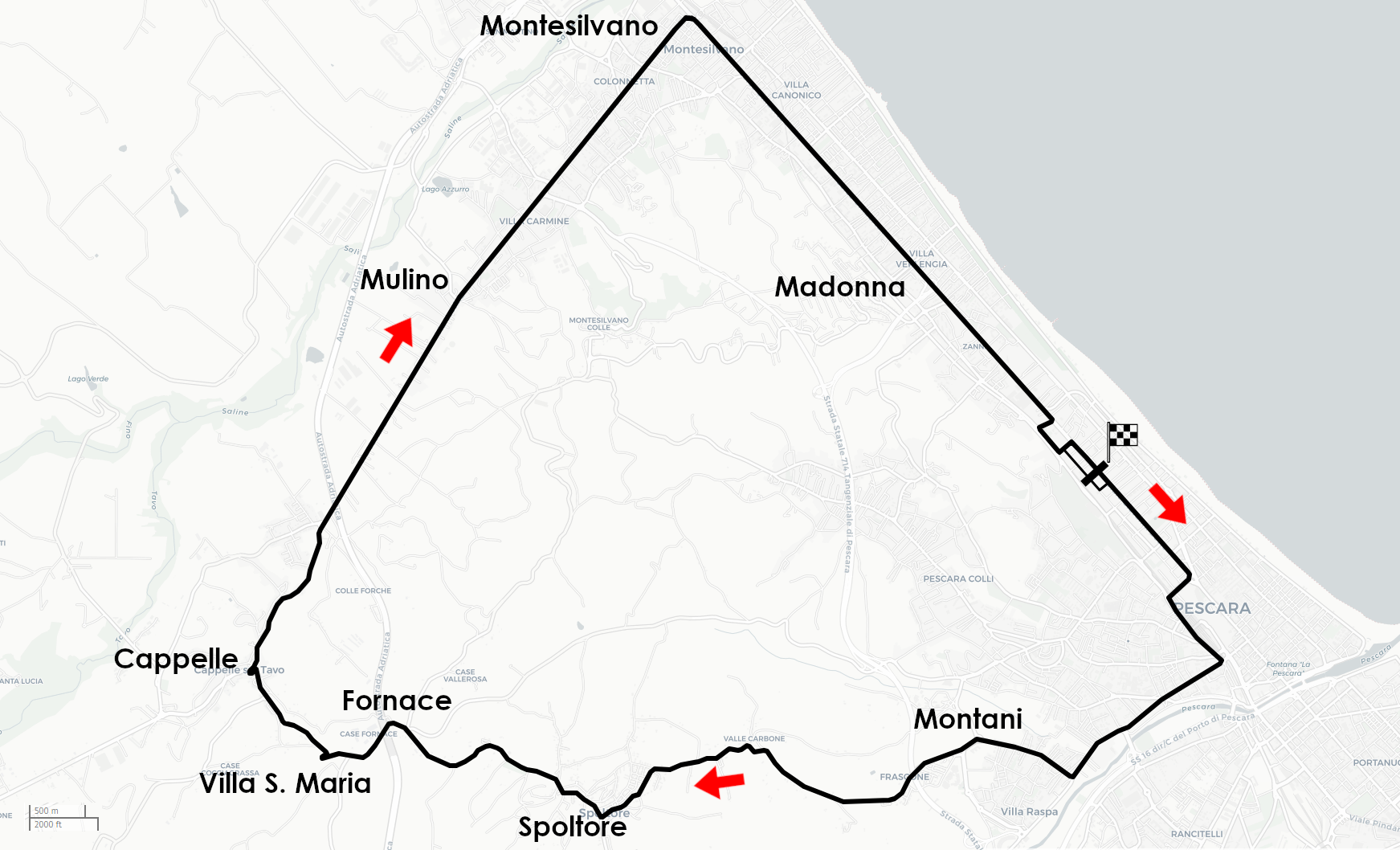

Race details
- Date: 18 August 1957
- Official name: XXV Circuito di Pescara
- Location: Pescara Circuit
- Course: Temporary road course
- Course length: 25.579 km (15.894 miles)
- Distance: 18 laps, 460.42 km (286.09 miles)
- Weather: Sunny, very hot, dry
- Attendance: 200,000

Pole position
Driver	(Argentina) Juan Manuel Fangio	Maserati
- Time: 9:44.6

Fastest lap
Driver	(United Kingdom) Stirling Moss	Vanwall
- Time: 9:44.6

Podium
First	(United Kingdom) Stirling Moss	Vanwall
Second	(Argentina) Juan Manuel Fangio	Maserati
Third	(United States) Harry Schell	Maserati

The 1957 Pescara Grand Prix was a Formula One motor race, held on 18 August 1957, at the Pescara Circuit near Pescara in Italy. The race was the 7th round of the 1957 World Championship of Drivers. The 25.579 km (15.894 mi) circuit is the longest to ever hold a world championship race in Formula One. The race was the first and only Formula One World Championship race to take place at the track. It was also the first of two consecutive Italian races, which meant that it was the first time that the same country had held two Formula One World Championship races in the same season.

== Background ==
The Grand Prix was contested by 16 drivers and three official constructors, with Luigi Musso entered unofficially due to Ferrari withdrawing with safety concerns. The constructors were Maserati, Vanwall and Cooper-Climax. Juan Manuel Fangio led the championship with 34 points, ahead of Luigi Musso on 16 points and Mike Hawthorn on 13 points. Tony Brooks was in 4th with 10 points, and Sam Hanks, Stirling Moss and Peter Collins were all 5th with 8 points. Fangio had won four races and had clinched the title at the 6th round, the German Grand Prix. Both Musso and Hawthorn finished in the top three for two races. Maserati had a strong start to the season, outshining Ferrari in both the race and qualifying on multiple occasions. Fangio had a strong start to the season, winning the first two rounds. Moss, however, had a poor start to the season. He struggled with reliability issues such as a broken throttle linkage at Argentina and became ill just before the French Grand Prix.

The Grand Prix was the first and only World Championship race to take place at Pescara. The circuit hosted its last event in 1961, after which it was closed due to safety concerns. The track was 25.579 km (15.894 mi) long, the longest circuit to ever host a Formula One World Championship round.

The event took place at short notice due to the sudden cancellation of the Belgian and Dutch Grands Prix over disputes regarding fees. The organisers had offered the constructors reduced appearance fees, which they rejected. Due to the large size of the circuit, no attempt was made to require an entry ticket. Many spectators watched the race from houses around the track. Around 200,000 spectators were estimated to have been in attendance.

=== Safety concerns ===
Pending the investigation for the deaths of 13 people at Mille Miglia earlier that year, Enzo Ferrari stated that Ferrari would not compete in the race. However, he did enter a single Ferrari 801 after he received insistent requests from Luigi Musso, though he stated that this did not constitute an official Ferrari entry into the race.

Despite a ban on all motor races on public roads following the disaster, the race was given special permission by the Italian Government to go ahead. The track was modified to conform with new safety regulations introduced after the accident. A chicane was added at the end of the seafront straight.

== Practice and qualifying ==
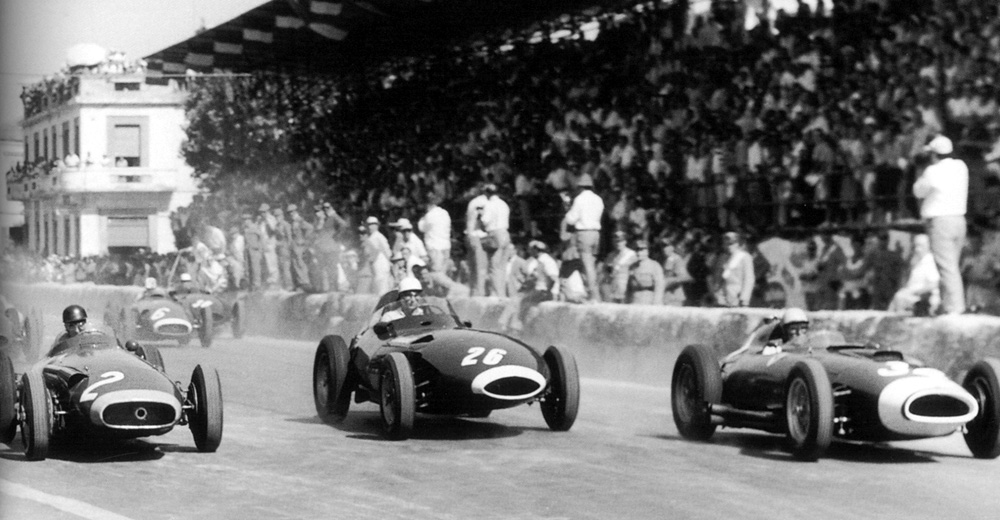
Start of the Pescara Grand Prix

There were no official Practice sessions. However, due to the circuit being a road course, many drivers drove observation laps in road cars two days before the race. Qualifying consisted of two sessions which were held on the Saturday before the Sunday race-from 07:00 to 09:30 and 16:30 to 18:30 local time. Between the two sessions, the straw bales were removed and the road was opened up again to the public. At the end of the sessions, Fangio set the quickest lap time of a 9:44.6 which gave him pole position. He set an average lap speed of 103.95 mph (167.29 km/h), which unofficially beat the previous lap record of 89.2 mph (143.6 km/h) because it was set during qualifying. Moss was second with a 9:54.7 and Musso was third with a 10:00.0.

=== Qualifying ===
Pos	No	Driver	Constructor	Time	Gap
1	2	(Argentina) Juan Manuel Fangio	Maserati	9:44.6	—
2	26	(United Kingdom) Stirling Moss	Vanwall	9:54.7	+10.1
3	34	(Italy) Luigi Musso	Ferrari	10:00.0	+15.4
4	4	(France) Jean Behra	Maserati	10:03.1	+18.5
5	6	(United States) Harry Schell	Maserati	10:04.6	+20.0
6	28	(United Kingdom) Tony Brooks	Vanwall	10:08.8	+24.2
7	14	(United States) Masten Gregory	Maserati	10:26.1	+41.5
8	30	(United Kingdom) Stuart Lewis-Evans	Vanwall	10:29.6	+45.0
9	16	(Sweden) Jo Bonnier	Maserati	10:36.2	+51.6
10	8	(Italy) Giorgio Scarlatti	Maserati	10:36.6	+52.0
11	18	(United Kingdom) Horace Gould	Maserati	10:49.6	+1:05.0
12	10	(Spain) Paco Godia	Maserati	11:09.8	+1:25.2
13	12	(Italy) Luigi Piotti	Maserati	11:10.6	+1:26.0
14	20	(United Kingdom) Bruce Halford	Maserati	11:16.3	+1:31.7
15	22	(United Kingdom) Roy Salvadori	Cooper-Climax	11:24.2	+1:39.6
16	24	(Australia) Jack Brabham	Cooper-Climax	11:35.2	+1:50.6

== Race ==
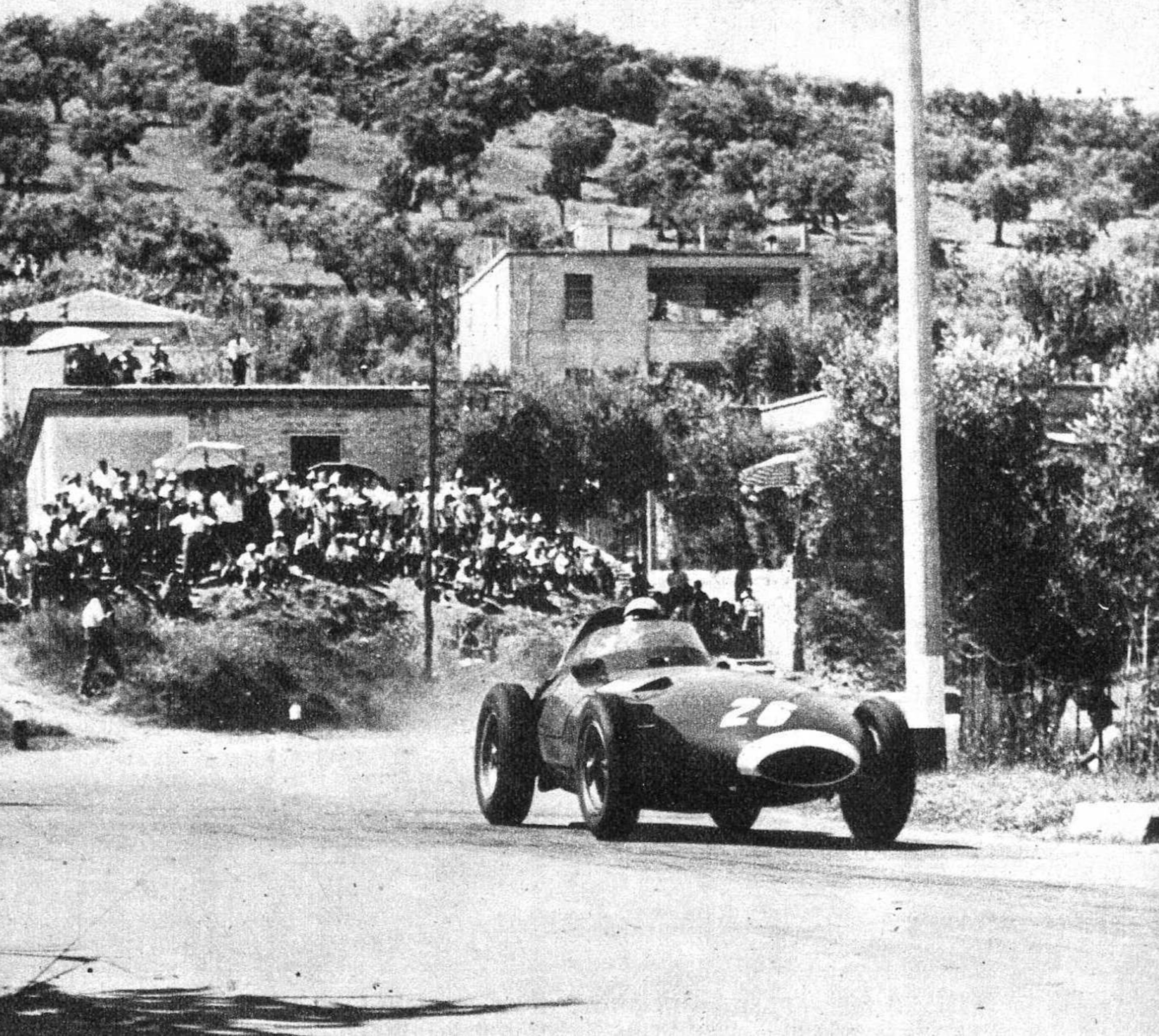
Winner Stirling Moss' Vanwall VW5 on the chicane prior the grandstands

Two hours before the race start, Fangio complained of pains in his right shoulder. However, he still competed in the race.

The race took place from 09:30 local time in dry and very hot weather.

A unique incident occurred when Jack Brabham's F2 Cooper was running short of fuel far from the pits and he pulled into a roadside petrol station and topped up.

=== Race classification ===
Pos	No	Driver	Constructor	Laps	Time/Retired	Grid	Points
1	26	(United Kingdom) Stirling Moss	Vanwall	18	2:59:22.7	2	9^{1}
2	2	(Argentina) Juan Manuel Fangio	Maserati	18	+3:13.9	1	6
3	6	(United States) Harry Schell	Maserati	18	+6:46.8	5	4
4	14	(United States) Masten Gregory	Maserati	18	+8:16.5	7	3
5	30	(United Kingdom) Stuart Lewis-Evans	Vanwall	17	+1 lap	8	2
6	8	(Italy) Giorgio Scarlatti	Maserati	17	+1 lap	10	
7	24	(Australia) Jack Brabham	Cooper-Climax	15	+3 laps	16	
Ret	34	(Italy) Luigi Musso	Ferrari	9	Oil leak	3	
Ret	10	(Spain) Paco Godia	Maserati	9	Engine	12	
Ret	20	(United Kingdom) Bruce Halford	Maserati	9	Transmission	14	
Ret	16	(Sweden) Jo Bonnier	Maserati	7	Overheating	9	
Ret	4	(France) Jean Behra	Maserati	3	Oil leak	4	
Ret	22	(United Kingdom) Roy Salvadori	Cooper-Climax	3	Accident	15	
Ret	28	(United Kingdom) Tony Brooks	Vanwall	1	Engine	6	
Ret	18	(United Kingdom) Horace Gould	Maserati	0	Accident	11	
Ret	12	(Italy) Luigi Piotti	Maserati	0	Engine	13	

Notes

- ^1 – Includes 1 point for fastest lap

== Championship standings after the race ==
- **Bold text** indicates the World Champion.

Drivers' Championship standings

	Pos	Driver	Points
	1	(Argentina) **Juan Manuel Fangio**	40
4	2	(United Kingdom) Stirling Moss	17
1	3	(Italy) Luigi Musso	16
1	4	(United Kingdom) Mike Hawthorn	13
1	5	(United Kingdom) Tony Brooks	10

- Note: only the top five positions are included.

Previous race: 1957 German Grand Prix	FIA Formula One World Championship; 1957 season	Next race: 1957 Italian Grand Prix
Previous race: 1956 Pescara Grand Prix	Pescara Grand Prix	Next race: 1960 Pescara Grand Prix
