= Pescara Circuit =

Race track

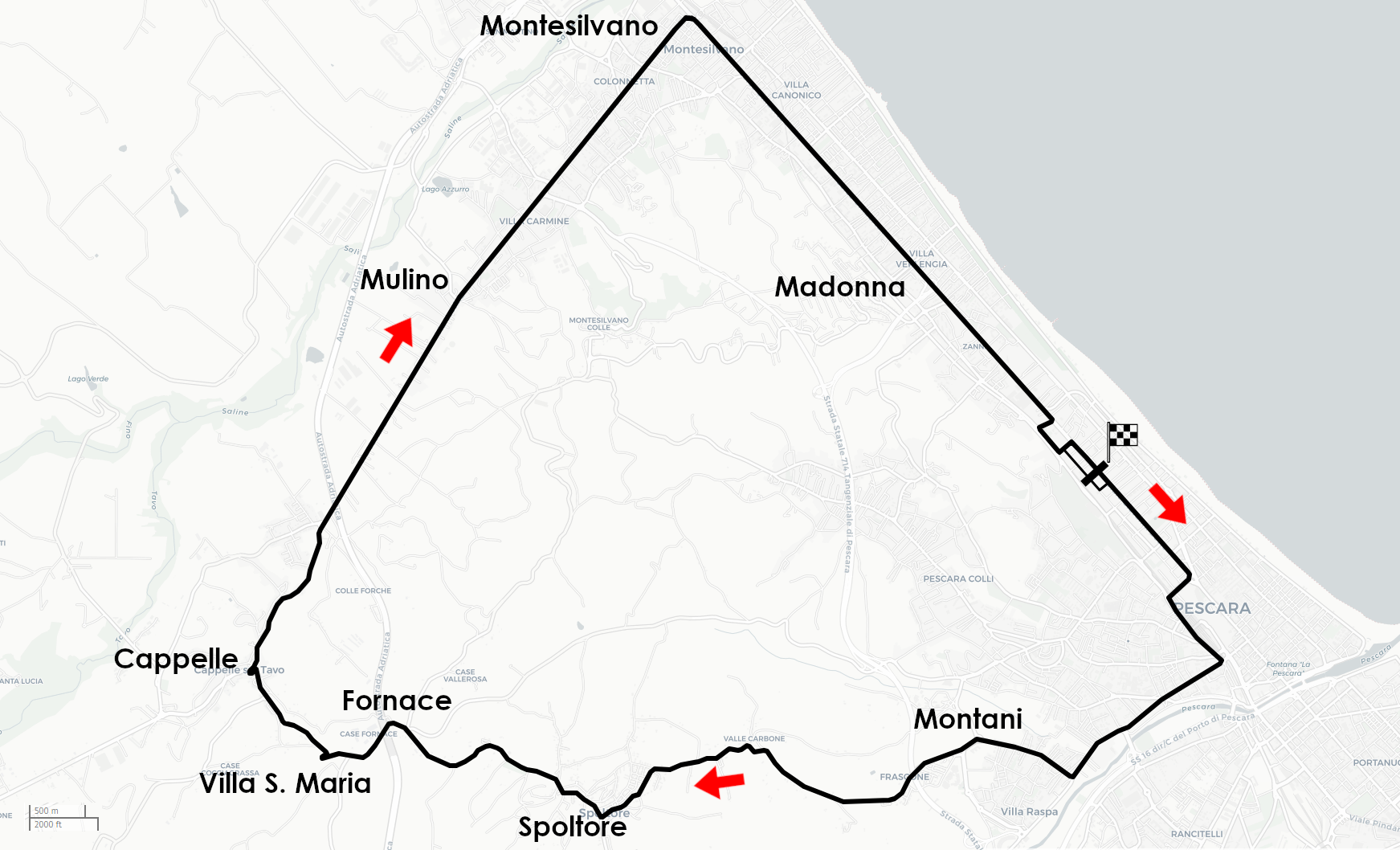
- Grand Prix Circuit (1934–1961)
- Location: Pescara, Abruzzo, Italy
- Coordinates: 42°28′30″N 14°9′3″E
- Opened: 13 July 1924; 102 years ago
- Closed: 15 August 1961; 64 years ago
- Major events: Formula One; Pescara Grand Prix (1957); World Sportscar Championship (1961); Coppa Acerbo (1924–1928, 1930–1939, 1947–1954, 1956–1957, 1960–1961)

Grand Prix Circuit (1934–1961)
- Length: 25.801 km (16.032 mi)
- Race lap record: 9:44.600 ( (United Kingdom) Stirling Moss, Vanwall VW 5, 1957, F1)

Original Road Course (1924–1933)
- Length: 25.578 km (15.893 mi)
- Race lap record: 10:25.400 (Alfa Romeo P3, (Italy) Tazio Nuvolari, 1932, GP)

The Pescara Circuit was a 25.801 km (16.032 mi) race course made up entirely of public roads near Pescara, Italy, that hosted the Coppa Acerbo auto race. Pescara is the longest circuit to ever host a Formula One Grand Prix, but was used only once, for the 1957 Pescara Grand Prix, in which Scuderia Ferrari remained absent.

== History ==
The country and town roads used were both narrow and bumpy. Like many long circuits (such as the original Nürburgring and Spa-Francorchamps circuits), Pescara was praised as a premier driver's circuit, but much like the Spa and the Nürburgring, it was extremely dangerous and unforgiving.

The long track travelled through a number of villages situated on hills surrounding Pescara, following a roughly triangular shape with its corners at the seaside municipality of Pescara. It included two 3.4 mi (5.5 km) long straights (about as long as the Mulsanne Straight at Le Mans and the Buonfornello Straight of the Targa Florio) between the seaside municipality of Montesilvano, nicknamed "The Flying Kilometre". It was on "The Flying Kilometre" that Guy Moll was killed during the 1934 Coppa Acerbo. The highest point, at Spoltore, was 185 m (607 ft) above sea level. The track started just outside the middle of Pescara, moving west through the suburb of Rione Partenze, and then into the hilly villages of Frascone, Valle Carbone, Spoltore, and Case Fornace, going through a mixture of slow and fast bends before dropping out of the hills into the inland municipality of Cappelle sul Tavo, then down the first 3.4 mi (5.5 km) straight northeast to Montesilvano before going down another 3.4 mi (5.5 km) straight and returning to Pescara.

The first race took place in 1924 and non-Championship Formula One races followed in the early 1950s, with one official Formula One World Championship event in 1957 due to the Suez Crisis-related cancellation of other races. The Pescara Grand Prix drew in excess of 200,000 spectators, and remains the longest circuit in terms of lap distance ever to stage a Formula One Grand Prix. But the circuit was feared even by Enzo Ferrari who did not send his cars to this race out of fear for his drivers' safety.

It was the first F1 circuit with an artificial chicane, built in 1934 on the start-finish straight to reduce speed in the pits after 3.4 mi (5.5 km) of flat out.

The track's last race was a four-hour World Sportscar Championship race in 1961, won by Lorenzo Bandini and Giorgio Scarlatti driving a Ferrari 250 TR for Scuderia Centro Sud. After that race the circuit was permanently retired as a racing venue as it was impossible for the organizers to guarantee the safety of drivers and spectators.

== Lap records ==
The fastest official race lap records at the Pescara Circuit are listed as:

Category	Time	Driver	Vehicle	Event
Grand Prix Circuit (1934–1961): 25.801 km (16.032 mi)
Formula One	9:44.6	Stirling Moss	Vanwall VW 5	1957 Pescara Grand Prix
Sports car racing	9:55.5	Richie Ginther	Ferrari Dino 246 SP	1961 4 Hours of Pescara
GP	10:35.0	Achille Varzi	Auto Union B	1935 Coppa Acerbo
Voiturette	11:06.8	Giuseppe Farina	Alfa Romeo 158	1939 Coppa Acerbo
Formula Junior	11:10.4	Denny Hulme	Cooper T52	1960 Pescara Grand Prix
Original Road Course (1926–1933): 25.578 km (15.893 mi)
GP	10:25.4	Tazio Nuvolari	Alfa Romeo P3	1932 Coppa Acerbo
