= 1961 British Empire Trophy =

- Non-championship race in the 1961 Formula One season
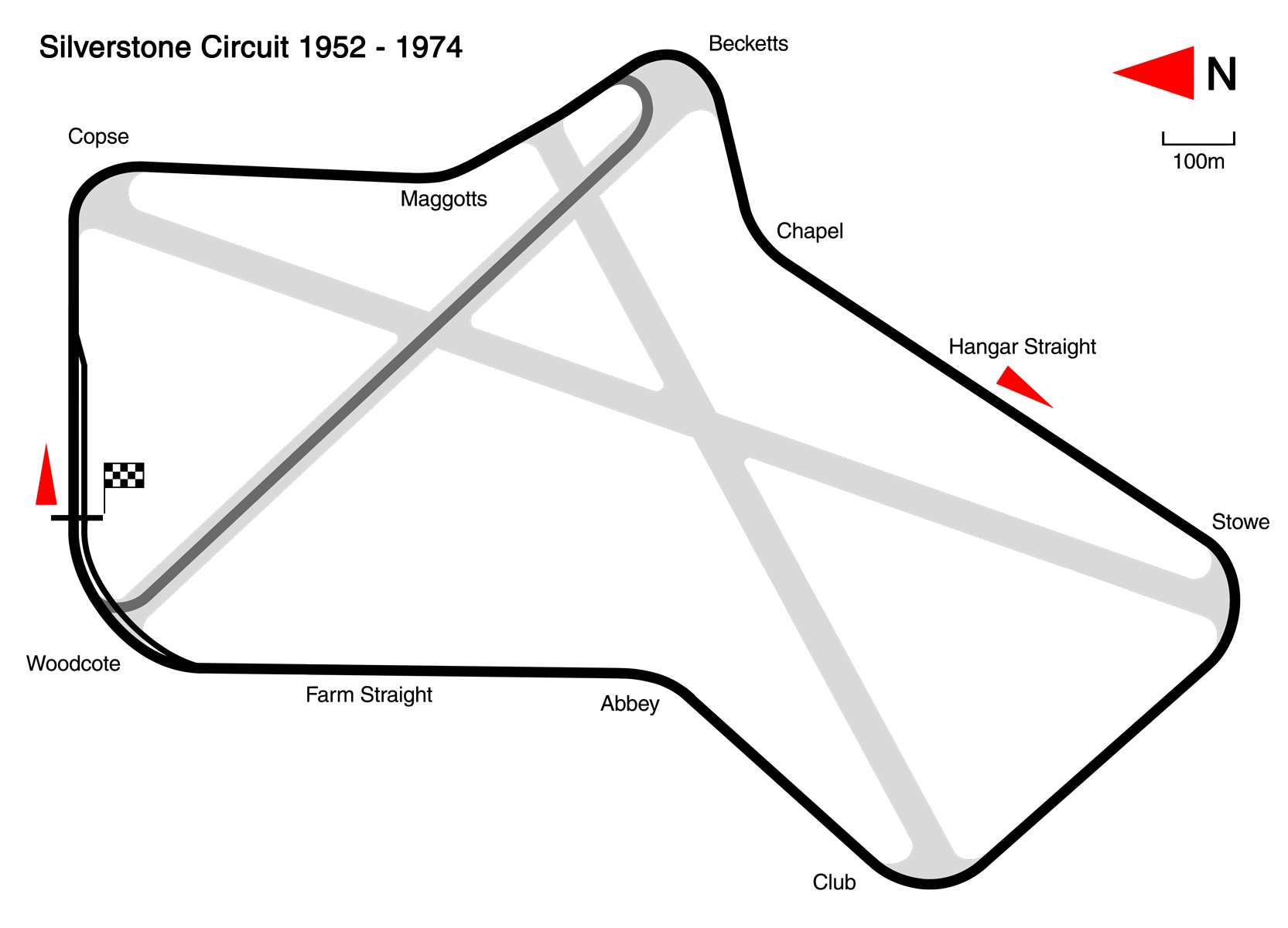

Race details
- Date: 8 July 1961
- Official name: XXIII British Empire Trophy
- Location: Silverstone Circuit, Northamptonshire
- Course: Permanent racing facility
- Course length: 4.710 km (2.927 mi)
- Distance: 52 laps, 244.92 km (152.19 mi)
- Weather: Wet, drying

Pole position
| Driver | (United Kingdom) John Surtees | Cooper-Climax |
- Time: 1:33.0

Fastest lap
| Driver | (United Kingdom) Stirling Moss | Cooper-Climax |
- Time: 1:36.4 on lap 50

Podium
| First | (United Kingdom) Stirling Moss | Cooper-Climax |
| Second | (United Kingdom) John Surtees | Cooper-Climax |
| Third | (United Kingdom) Graham Hill | BRM |

The 1961 British Empire Trophy was the 23rd British Empire Trophy and an Intercontinental Formula motor race held on 8 July 1961 at the Silverstone Circuit, Northamptonshire. The race was run over 52 laps of the Silverstone Grand Prix circuit, and was won by British driver Stirling Moss in a Cooper T53-Climax, who also set fastest lap. John Surtees in a similar Cooper and Graham Hill in a BRM P48 were second and third, Surtees having started from pole position.

== Results ==
| Pos | No. | Driver | Entrant | Constructor | Time/Retired | Grid |
|---|---|---|---|---|---|---|
| 1 | 7 | (United Kingdom) Stirling Moss | R.R.C. Walker Racing Team | Cooper T53-Climax | 1:27:19.2, 104.58 mph | 2 |
| 2 | 22 | (United Kingdom) John Surtees | Yeoman Credit Racing Team | Cooper T53-Climax | +50.6s | 1 |
| 3 | 12 | (United Kingdom) Graham Hill | Owen Racing Organisation | BRM P48 | 52 laps | 8 |
| 4 | 2 | (New Zealand) Bruce McLaren | Atkins Cars | Cooper T53-Climax | +1 lap | 3 |
| 5 | 9 | (United Kingdom) Jim Clark | Team Lotus | Lotus 18-Climax | +2 laps | 10 |
| 6 | 24 | (United Kingdom) Roy Salvadori | Yeoman Credit Racing Team | Cooper T53-Climax | +2 laps | 7 |
| 7 | 17 | (Italy) Lorenzo Bandini | Scuderia Centro Sud | Cooper T51-Maserati | +2 laps | 14 |
| 8 | 18 | (United Kingdom) Tony Marsh | Fred Tuck | Cooper T45-Climax | +2 laps | 12 |
| 9 | 10 | (United Kingdom) Innes Ireland | Team Lotus | Lotus 18-Climax | +2 laps | 5 |
| 10 | 3 | (Belgium) Lucien Bianchi (United Kingdom) Henry Taylor | UDT-Laystall Racing Team | Lotus 18/21-Climax | +4 laps | 16 |
| 11 | 16 | (Italy) Gino Munaron | Scuderia Centro Sud | Cooper T51-Maserati | +15 laps | 17 |
| Ret. | 1 | (Australia) Jack Brabham | Brabham Racing Organisation | Cooper T53-Climax | 23 laps, suspension | 4 |
| Ret. | 11 | (United Kingdom) Tony Brooks | Owen Racing Organisation | BRM P48 | 22 laps, valve springs | 6 |
| Ret. | 19 | (Australia) Lex Davison | Ecurie Australie | Aston Martin DBR4 | 17 laps, gearbox | 13 |
| Ret. | 6 | (United Kingdom) Brian Naylor | JBW Cars | JBW-Maserati | 11 laps, oil pressure | 18 |
| Ret. | 23 | (United Kingdom) Tim Parnell | Yeoman Credit Racing Team | Lotus 18-Climax | 11 laps, crash | 15 |
| Ret. | 4 | (United Kingdom) Henry Taylor | UDT-Laystall Racing Team | Lotus 18-Climax | 4 laps, transmission | 9 |
| Ret. | 8 | (United Kingdom) Jack Fairman | R.R.C. Walker Racing Team | Ferguson P99-Climax | 2 laps, gear selector | 11 |
| DNS | 20 | (United States) Chuck Daigh | Reventlow Racing Automobiles | Scarab-Meyer-Drake | Crash | |
| DNS | 15 | (United Kingdom) John Surtees | G.A. Vandervell | Vanwall VW14 | Drove #22 | |
| DNS | 1T | (Australia) Jack Brabham | G.A. Vandervell | Vanwall VW14 | Drove #1 | |
| DNS | 8 | (United Kingdom) Stirling Moss | R.R.C. Walker Racing Team | Ferguson P99-Climax | Drove #7; car driven by Fairman | |
| DNA | 5 | (United States) Dan Gurney | Mrs. Louise Bryden-Brown | Lotus 18-Climax | | |
| DNA | 14 | (United Kingdom) Bruce Halford | Jim Diggory | Lotus 18-Climax | | |
| DNA | 21 | (Italy) Gino Munaron | Scuderia Castellotti | Cooper T51-Ferrari | Drove #16 | |
| DNA | 16 | (Italy) Massimo Natili | Scuderia Centro Sud | Cooper T51-Maserati | Car driven by Munaron | |
| DNA | 23 | (United Kingdom) Mike Parkes | Yeoman Credit Racing Team | Lotus 18-Climax | Car driven by Parnell | |

| Previous race: 1961 Silver City Trophy | Formula One non-championship races 1961 season | Next race: 1961 Solitude Grand Prix |
| Previous race: 1960 British Empire Trophy | British Empire Trophy | Next race: 1970 British Empire Trophy |
