= 1961 Guards Trophy =

- Non-championship race in the 1961 Formula One season

Race details
- Date: 7 August 1961
- Official name: 1961 Guards Trophy
- Location: Brands Hatch, Kent
- Course: Permanent racing facility
- Course length: 4.265 km (2.650 mi)
- Distance: 76 laps, 324.14 km (201.41 mi)
- Weather: Dry, sunny

Pole position
Driver	(United Kingdom) Stirling Moss	Cooper-Climax
- Time: 1:37.4

Fastest lap
Driver	(New Zealand) Bruce McLaren	Cooper-Climax
- Time: 1:40.2

Podium
First	(Australia) Jack Brabham	Cooper-Climax
Second	(United Kingdom) Jim Clark	Lotus-Climax
Third	(United Kingdom) Graham Hill	BRM

The Guards Trophy was an Intercontinental Formula motor race held on 7 August 1961 at Brands Hatch Circuit. The race was run over 76 laps of the circuit, and was won by Australian driver Jack Brabham in a Cooper T53-Climax. Brabham lapped the entire field. Jim Clark in a Lotus 18-Climax was second and Graham Hill in a BRM P48 was third. Bruce McLaren in another T53 set fastest lap and finished fourth. Stirling Moss qualified in pole position but retired with gearbox problems.

This was the final Intercontinental Formula race. The formula had been overshadowed by the new 1.5 litre Formula One championship and was quietly abandoned.

== Results ==
Pos	No.	Driver	Entrant	Constructor	Time/Retired	Grid
1	2	(Australia) Jack Brabham	Brabham Racing Organisation	Cooper T53-Climax	2:10:53.6	5
2	16	(United Kingdom) Jim Clark	Team Lotus	Lotus 18-Climax	+1 lap	7
3	28	(United Kingdom) Graham Hill	Owen Racing Organisation	BRM P48	+1 lap	4
4	4	(New Zealand) Bruce McLaren	C.T. Atkins	Cooper T53-Climax	+1 lap	2
5	6	(United Kingdom) Roy Salvadori	Yeoman Credit Racing Team	Cooper T53-Climax	+2 laps	8
6	40	(Australia) Lex Davison	Ecurie Australie	Aston Martin DBR4	+5 laps	13
7	30	(Italy) Lorenzo Bandini	Scuderia Centro Sud	Cooper-Maserati	+42 laps	16
Ret.	26	(United Kingdom) Tony Brooks	Owen Racing Organisation	BRM P48	51 laps, throttle linkage	10
Ret.	14	(United Kingdom) Innes Ireland	Team Lotus	Lotus 18-Climax	34 laps, gearbox	6
Ret.	20	(United States) Dan Gurney	UDT-Laystall Racing Team	Lotus 18/21-Climax	26 laps, gearbox	9
Ret.	22	(United Kingdom) Bruce Halford	S.J. Diggory (Motors) Ltd.	Lotus 18-Climax	26 laps, crown wheel	14
Ret	34	(United Kingdom) Brian Naylor	JBW Cars	JBW-Maserati	25 laps, oil pressure	15
Ret.	12	(United Kingdom) Stirling Moss	R.R.C. Walker Racing Team	Cooper T53-Climax	23 laps, gearbox	1
Ret.	32	(Italy) Massimo Natili	Scuderia Centro Sud	Cooper T51-Maserati	19 laps, clutch	17
Ret.	8	(United Kingdom) John Surtees	Yeoman Credit Racing Team	Cooper T53-Climax	19 laps, crash	3
Ret.	36	(United Kingdom) Tony Marsh	Fred Tuck Cars	Cooper T45-Climax	9 laps, brake pipe	12
Ret.	18	(United States) Masten Gregory	UDT-Laystall Racing Team	Lotus 18/21-Climax	5 laps, crash	11
DNA	10		Yeoman Credit Racing Team	Cooper		
DNA	24	(United States) Chuck Daigh	Reventlow Automobiles Ltd.	Scarab-Meyer-Drake	Driver injured, car not repaired	
DNA	38	(United Kingdom) Tommy Weber	G.R. Pennington	Tec-Mec-Maserati		

Previous race: 1961 Solitude Grand Prix	Formula One non-championship races 1961 season	Next race: 1961 Kanonloppet
Previous race: —	Guards Trophy	Next race: 1962 Guards Trophy
