= 1961 BRDC International Trophy =

- Non-championship race in the 1961 Formula One season
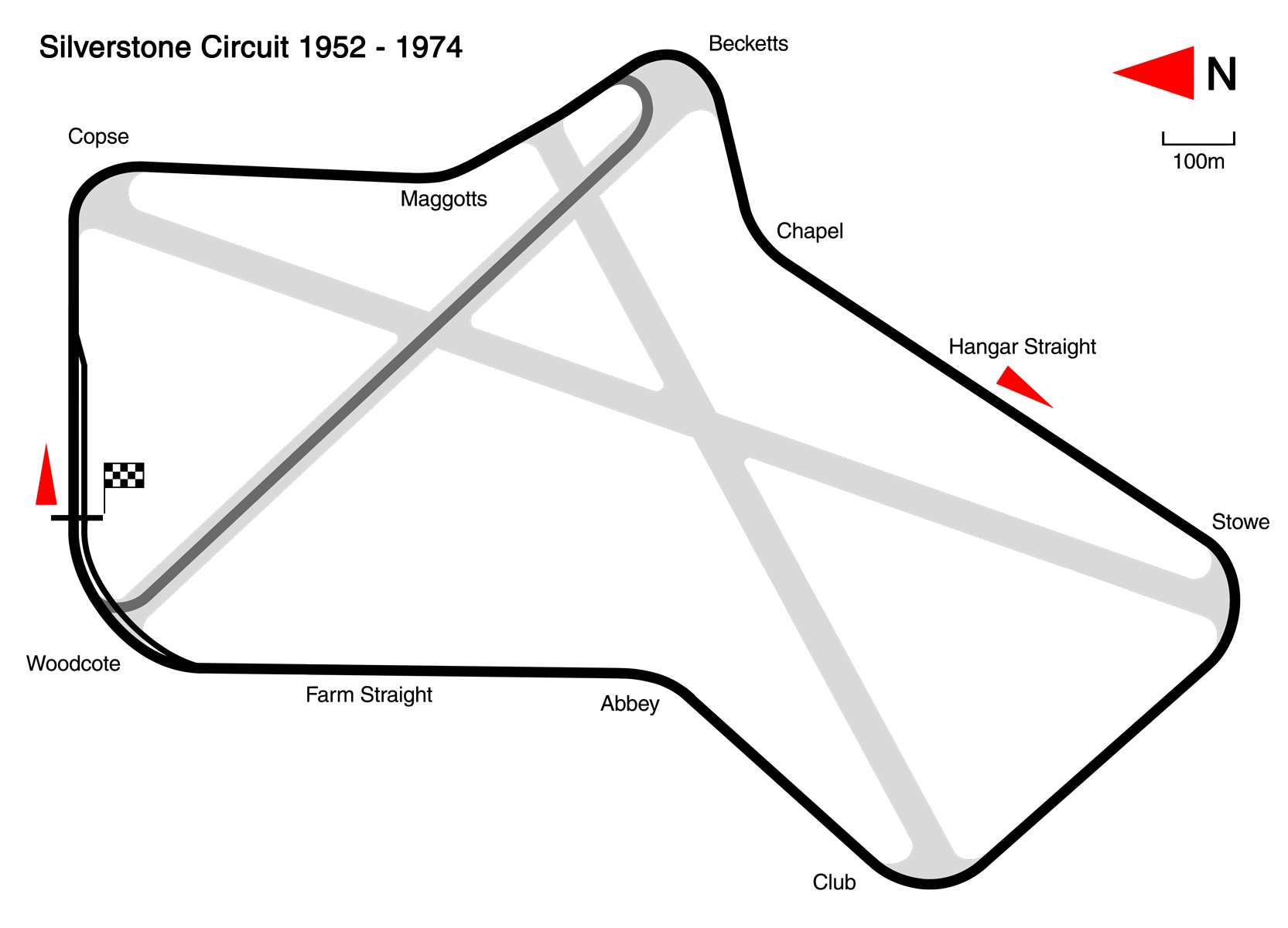

Race details
- Date: 6 May 1961
- Official name: XIII BRDC International Trophy
- Location: Silverstone Circuit, Northamptonshire
- Course: Permanent racing facility
- Course length: 4.710 km (2.927 mi)
- Distance: 80 laps, 376.80 km (234.13 mi)
- Weather: Very wet

Pole position
Driver	(New Zealand) Bruce McLaren	Cooper-Climax
- Time: 1:34.2

Fastest lap
Driver	(United Kingdom) Stirling Moss	Cooper-Climax
- Time: 1:52.4

Podium
First	(United Kingdom) Stirling Moss	Cooper-Climax
Second	(Australia) Jack Brabham	Cooper-Climax
Third	(United Kingdom) Roy Salvadori	Cooper-Climax

The 13th BRDC International Trophy was an Intercontinental Formula motor race held on 6 May 1961 at the Silverstone Circuit, Northamptonshire. The race was run over 80 laps of the Silverstone Grand Prix circuit, and was won by British driver Stirling Moss in a Cooper T53-Climax, who also set fastest lap and lapped the rest of the field. Jack Brabham and Roy Salvadori were second and third in similar cars.

This race marked the final participation by a Vanwall car, John Surtees bringing it home in fifth place.

== Results ==
Pos	No.	Driver	Entrant	Constructor	Time/Retired	Grid
1	4	(United Kingdom) Stirling Moss	R.R.C. Walker Racing Team	Cooper T53-Climax	2:41:19.2, 87.18 mph	2
2	1	(Australia) Jack Brabham	Yeoman Credit Racing Team	Cooper T53-Climax	+1 lap	3
3	10	(United Kingdom) Roy Salvadori	Yeoman Credit Racing Team	Cooper T53-Climax	+2 laps	7
4	14	(United Kingdom) Henry Taylor	UDT-Laystall Racing Team	Lotus 18-Climax	+2 laps	17
5	28	(United Kingdom) John Surtees	G.A. Vandervell	Vanwall VW14	+3 laps	6
6	6	(United Kingdom) Tony Brooks	Owen Racing Organisation	BRM P48	+3 laps	8
7	17	(United States) Chuck Daigh	Reventlow Racing Automobiles	Scarab-Meyer-Drake	+3 laps	15
8	15	(Italy) Lorenzo Bandini	Scuderia Centro Sud	Cooper T51-Maserati	+10 laps	13
9	5	(United Kingdom) Graham Hill	Owen Racing Organisation	BRM P48	+16 laps	4
10	7	(United Kingdom) Innes Ireland	Team Lotus	Lotus 18-Climax	+20 laps	5
Ret.	23	(United Kingdom) Ron Flockhart	Jack Brabham Racing Ltd.	Cooper T53-Climax	71 laps, crash	12
Ret.	12	(United Kingdom) Cliff Allison	UDT-Laystall Racing Team	Lotus 18-Climax	68 laps, misfire	11
Ret.	8	(United Kingdom) Jim Clark	Team Lotus	Lotus 18-Climax	55 laps, clutch	9
Ret.	24	(United Kingdom) Tony Marsh	Fred Tuck	Cooper T45-Climax	38 laps, oil loss	14
Ret.	20	(United Kingdom) Brian Naylor	JBW Cars	JBW-Maserati	15 laps, spin and stalled	16
Ret.	22	(United Kingdom) Tim Parnell	Tim Parnell	Lotus 18-Climax	8 laps, crash	18
Ret	2	(New Zealand) Bruce McLaren	Atkins Cars	Cooper T53-Climax	3 laps, crash	1
Ret	19	(United Kingdom) Geoff Richardson	Geoffrey Richardson	Cooper-Climax	2 laps, spin	20
Ret	16	(Italy) Massimo Natili	Scuderia Centro Sud	Cooper T51-Maserati	0 laps, crash	19
DNS	9	(United Kingdom) Mike Parkes	Yeoman Credit Racing Team	Lotus 18-Climax	Crash	10
DNS	21	(United States) Dan Gurney	Mrs. Louise Bryden-Brown	Lotus 18-Climax	Crash	
DNA	3	(United Kingdom) Stirling Moss	R.R.C. Walker Racing Team	Lotus 18-Climax	Drove #4	
DNA	11	(United Kingdom) John Surtees	Yeoman Credit Racing Team	Cooper T53-Climax	Drove #28	
DNA	18	(Italy) Giulio Cabianca	Scuderia Castellotti	Cooper T51-Ferrari		
DNA	25	(United Kingdom) Ian Burgess	Camoradi International	Lotus 18-Climax	Withdrawn	
DNA	26	(United States) Lloyd Casner	Camoradi International	Lotus 18-Climax	Withdrawn	
DNA	27	(United States) Masten Gregory	Camoradi International	Cooper T51-Climax	Withdrawn	
DNA	4	(France) Maurice Trintignant	R.R.C. Walker Racing Team	Cooper T53-Climax	Car driven by Moss	

Previous race: 1961 Syracuse Grand Prix	Formula One non-championship races 1961 season	Next race: 1961 Naples Grand Prix
Previous race: 1960 BRDC International Trophy	BRDC International Trophy	Next race: 1962 BRDC International Trophy
