= Ferguson P99 =

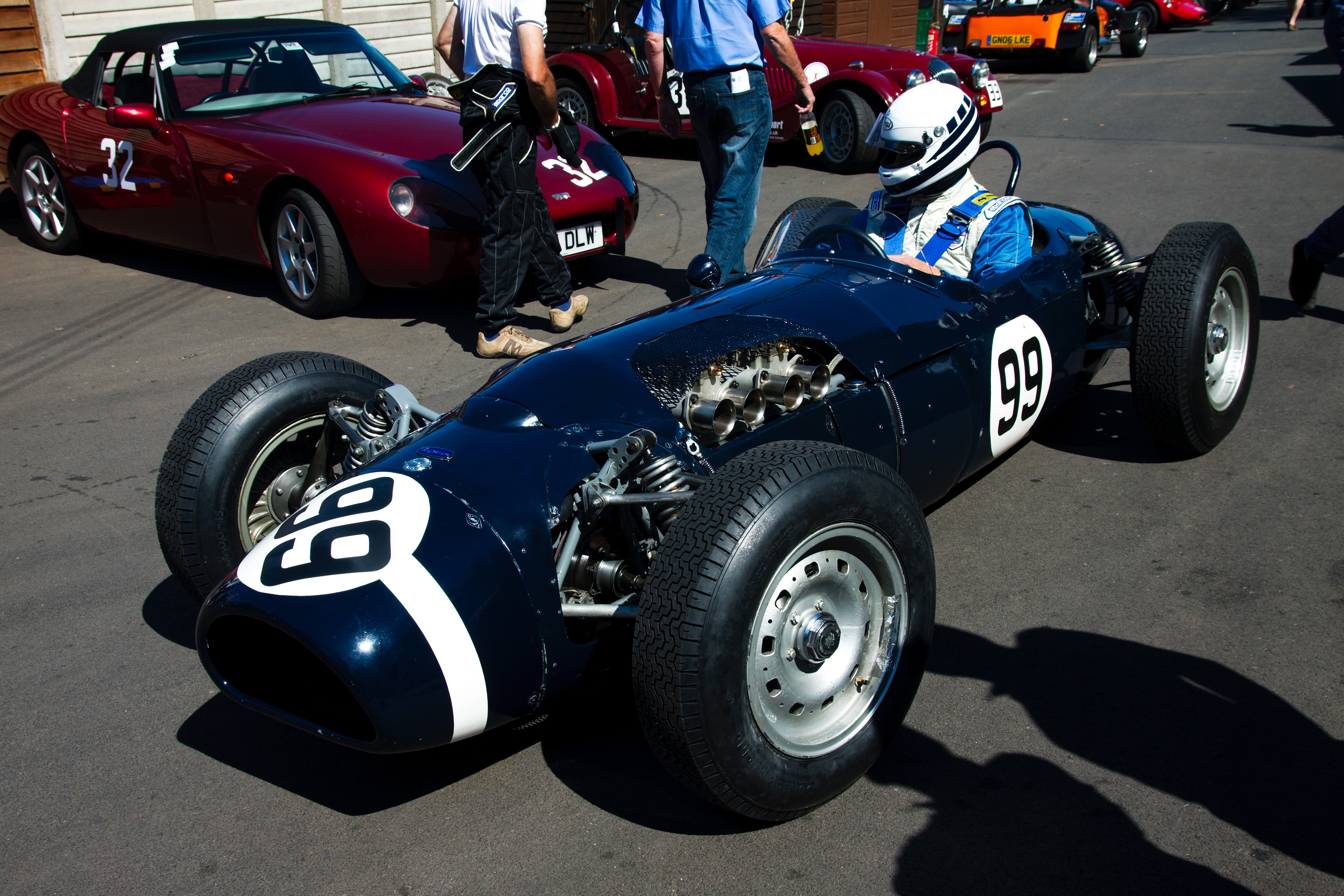
- Category: Formula One
- Constructor: Ferguson
- Designer: Claude Hill

Technical specifications
- Chassis: Tubular Spaceframe
- Engine: Coventry Climax FPF 1496 cc L4 naturally aspirated front-mounted.
- Transmission: 5-speed manual
- Tyres: Dunlop

Competition history
- Notable entrants: Rob Walker Racing Team
- Notable drivers: (United Kingdom) Stirling Moss (United Kingdom) Jack Fairman
- Debut: 1961 British Grand Prix
Races	Wins	Poles	F/Laps
1	0	0	0
- Constructors' Championships: 0
- Drivers' Championships: 0
- Unless otherwise stated, all data refer to Formula One World Championship Grands Prix only.

The Ferguson P99 was a front-engine four-wheel drive Grand Prix car built by Ferguson Research Ltd. which was raced by the Rob Walker Racing Team on behalf of the company in 1961. Officially named as Ferguson Climax, it derived its P99 name from its Harry Ferguson Research project number. F1 used 2.5-litre engines up to 1960, and only 1.5-litre from 1961, and Coventry Climax provided 4-cylinder-engines of each size. It remains the most famous example of its type as a result of its twin claims to fame: the Non-championship race victory by Stirling Moss in September 1961 International Gold Cup on a wet Oulton Park track was both the first AWD car to win a Formula 1 event, and the last front-engined car to win a Formula 1 event.

== History ==
Tony Rolt first considered the possibility of using Ferguson 4WD in circuit racing, and with Harry Ferguson (1884 – 25 October 1960) keen to promote the 4WD transmission systems of Harry Ferguson Research, work began on the P99 in 1960. With a 50–50 torque distribution front to rear the car, Claude Hill's design was built to have an even weight distribution over both axles, which along with the position of the gearbox necessitated a front-engined design despite Cooper's and Lotus's overwhelming success with mid-engined cars already in the recent 1959 Formula One season. In the 1960 Formula One season, front-engined cars were outclassed until the Italian Grand Prix was held on the banked Oval version of Monza to hand a victory to Ferrari.

A reduction to 1500cc and a minimum car weight of 450 kg, basically adopting Formula Two rules as F1 for 1961, was already decided in October 1958 by FIA/CSI, but British teams protested against it. Some of them in 1961 staged Intercontinental Formula races with the 2500cc engines.

Just as the project was nearing completion it was dealt something of a blow by the governing body's final decision to reduce the size of F1 engines by 40% for 1961, making the extra weight of the AWD transmission a much bigger penalty. Nevertheless, the team persevered and fitted a standard F2 1.5-litre Climax FPF 4-cylinder engine, mounted at a slant to make room for the front driveshaft. In addition the driving position was moved slightly off-centre to accommodate the gearbox and rear driveshaft to the driver's left hand side.

The car was first raced in the 8 July 1961 British Empire Trophy Non-championship at Silverstone, where Rob Walker put Jack Fairman in the car, but the start was an inauspicious one as Fairman crashed on lap 2. A week later, in the 1961 British Grand Prix at Aintree, Fairman drove the car again, but surrendered it to Stirling Moss after his Walker-entered Lotus 18 failed. The car was disqualified for outside assistance on lap 56. The car's last major F1 race was its moment of motor racing immortality, as Moss drove the P99 to victory in a damp September 1961 International Gold Cup at Oulton Park.

In February 1963, the car, now having been fitted with a 2.5-litre Climax engine, was driven by Innes Ireland and Graham Hill in the series of off-season races in New Zealand and Australia, including the 1963 Australian Grand Prix at Warwick Farm and the Lakeside International at Lakeside, placing sixth and second respectively. The P99's final competition action during this period came in the British Hillclimb championship in 1964, 1965, and 1966, with Peter Westbury winning the title in 1964. The car has competed in recent years in historic races.

The P99 was later the inspiration for the AWD Ferguson P104 Novi Indycar, which Bobby Unser drove in the Indy 500 in 1964 and 1965. The car was damaged beyond immediate repair in the horrific crash in 1964, and was retired from regular competition in 1965 with engine problems.

In a 1997 interview for Motor Sport magazine, Sir Stirling Moss nominated the P99 as his favourite of all the F1 cars he drove.

== Complete Formula One World Championship results ==
(key)

Year	Entrant	Engine	Driver	1	2	3	4	5	6	7	8	Pts.	WCC
1961	Rob Walker Racing	Climax L4		MON	NED	BEL	FRA	GBR	GER	ITA	USA	0	–
1961	Rob Walker Racing	Climax L4	Jack Fairman/ Stirling Moss					DSQ				0	–
