= 1961 Lewis-Evans Trophy =

- Non-championship race in the 1961 Formula One season

Race details
- Date: 1 October 1961
- Official name: V Lewis-Evans Trophy
- Location: Brands Hatch
- Course: Permanent racing facility
- Course length: 4.265 km (2.65 miles)
- Distance: 30 laps, 127.943 km (79.5 miles)

Pole position
Driver	(United Kingdom) Tony Marsh	BRM-Climax
- Time: 1:43.8

Fastest lap
Driver	(United Kingdom) Tony Marsh	BRM-Climax
- Time: 1:43.6

Podium
First	(United Kingdom) Tony Marsh	BRM-Climax
Second	(United Kingdom) Mike Spence	Emeryson-Climax
Third	(United Kingdom) Tim Parnell	Lotus-Climax

The 5th Lewis-Evans Trophy was a motor race, run to Formula One rules, held on 1 October 1961 at Brands Hatch Circuit. The race was run over 30 laps of the circuit, and was dominated by British driver Tony Marsh in a BRM P48.

This Formula One race was unusual in that non-British competitors were not permitted to take part. French driver Bernard Collomb, who had intended to enter the race, decided to lend his car to John Campbell-Jones.

== Qualifying ==
Pos	No.	Driver	Constructor	Lap	Gap
1	14	(United Kingdom) Tony Marsh	BRM-Climax	1:43.8	—
2	15	(United Kingdom) Mike Spence	Emeryson-Climax	1:45.6	+1.8
3	17	(United Kingdom) Keith Greene	Gilby-Climax	1:45.8	+2.0
4	11	(United Kingdom) Tim Parnell	Lotus-Climax	1:46.6	+2.8
5	5	(United Kingdom) John Campbell-Jones	Cooper-Climax	1:47.4	+3.6
6	18	(United Kingdom) Hugh Dibley	Lola-Ford	1:51.0	+7.2
7	6	(United Kingdom) Chris Ashmore	Cooper-Climax	1:51.0	+7.2
8	16	(United Kingdom) Brian Naylor	JBW-Climax	1:59.2	+15.4
9	12	(United Kingdom) Peter Proctor	Lotus-Climax	2:03.2	+19.4
10	7	(United Kingdom) Chris Summers	Cooper-Climax	2:06.4	+22.6
11	8	(United Kingdom) Graham Eden	Cooper-Climax	2:10.8	+27.0
12	4	(United Kingdom) Maurice Charles	Cooper-Climax	2:16.0	+32.2
13	2	(United Kingdom) Dickie Stoop	Cooper-Climax	2:16.4	+32.6

== Results ==
Pos	Driver	Entrant	Constructor	Time/Retired	Grid
1	(United Kingdom) Tony Marsh	Tony Marsh	BRM-Climax	52:19.8	1
2	(United Kingdom) Mike Spence	Emeryson Cars	Emeryson-Climax	+ 23.0 s	2
3	(United Kingdom) Tim Parnell	Tim Parnell	Lotus-Climax	+ 27.8 s	4
4	(United Kingdom) Keith Greene	Gilby Engineering	Gilby-Climax	29 laps	3
5	(United Kingdom) Graham Eden	Graham Eden	Cooper-Climax	28 laps	11
6	(United Kingdom) Chris Summers	Ansty Garage	Cooper-Climax	28 laps	10
7	(United Kingdom) John Campbell-Jones	Bernard Collomb	Cooper-Climax	27 laps	5
8	(United Kingdom) Dickie Stoop	Dickie Stoop	Cooper-Climax	20 laps	13
9	(United Kingdom) Hugh Dibley	Scuderia Light Blue	Lola-Ford	12 laps	6
Ret	(United Kingdom) Peter Proctor	Anthony Brooke	Lotus-Climax	Oil seal	9
Ret	(United Kingdom) Chris Ashmore	Denis Taylor	Cooper-Climax	Overheating	7
Ret	(United Kingdom) Maurice Charles	Maurice Charles	Cooper-Climax	Overheating	12
Ret	(United Kingdom) Brian Naylor	JBW Cars	JBW-Climax	Rotor arm	8
WD	(United Kingdom) Jackie Lewis	H & L Motors	Cooper-Climax		-
WD	(United Kingdom) Ian Burgess	Ian Burgess	Cooper-Climax		-
WD	(United Kingdom) Bruce Halford	Jim Diggory	Lotus-Climax	Car not ready	-
WD	(United Kingdom) Gerry Ashmore	Gerry Ashmore	Lotus-Climax	Car damaged / Driver injured	-

Previous race: 1961 International Gold Cup	Formula One non-championship races 1961 season	Next race: 1961 Coppa Italia
Previous race: —	Lewis-Evans Trophy	Next race: —
