= 1962 Sandown International Cup =

The 1962 Sandown International Cup was a motor race for Formula Libre cars, staged at Sandown Park, in Victoria, Australia on 12 March 1962. The race was contested over 60 laps, a total distance of 120 miles (193 km). It was the feature race at the opening meeting of the Sandown Park circuit.

The race was won by Jack Brabham driving a Cooper T55 Coventry Climax.

== Results ==
Position	Driver	No.	Car	Entrant	Laps	Time
1	Jack Brabham	1	Cooper T55 Coventry Climax	Ecurie Vitesse	60	1h 10m 08.6s
2	John Surtees	3	Cooper T53 Coventry Climax	Yeoman Credit Racing Team	60	1h 10m 09.4s
3	Bruce McLaren	10	Cooper T53 Coventry Climax	C. R. Atkins	60	1h 10m 12.7s
4	Chuck Daigh	5	Scarab RE Buick	Reventlow Automobiles Inc.	59	
5	Stirling Moss	7	Cooper T53 Coventry Climax	R. R. C. Walker	59	
6	Jim Clark	8	Lotus 21 Coventry Climax	Team Lotus	58	
7	Bill Patterson	9	Cooper T51 Coventry Climax	Bill Patterson Motors	57	
8	Lex Davison	14	Aston Marin DBR4/250	Ecurie Australie	57	
9	Angus Hyslop	20	Cooper T53 Coventry Climax	Tourist Motor & Farming Equip.	57	
10	Doug Whiteford	15	Cooper T51 Coventry Climax	Bill Patterson Motors		
11	Pat Hoare	19	Ferrari Dino 246/60	P. N. Hoare		
DNF	Austin Miller	31	Cooper T51 Chevrolet Corvette	Austin Miller		
DNF	John Roxburgh	29	Cooper T45 Coventry Climax	J. B. Roxburgh		
DNF	Bryan Thompson	17	Cooper T51 Coventry Climax	Ecurie Shepparton		
DNF	John Youl	12	Cooper T51 Coventry Climax	Scuderia Veloce	49	
DNF	Ron Flockhart	41	Lotus 18 Coventry Climax	R. Flockhart		
DNF	Roy Salvadori	2	Cooper T53 Coventry Climax	Yeoman Credit Racing Team	24	
DNF	Bib Stillwell	6	Cooper T53 Coventry Climax	B. S. Stillwell	3	
