= 1961 Solitude Grand Prix =

- Non-championship race in the 1961 Formula One season
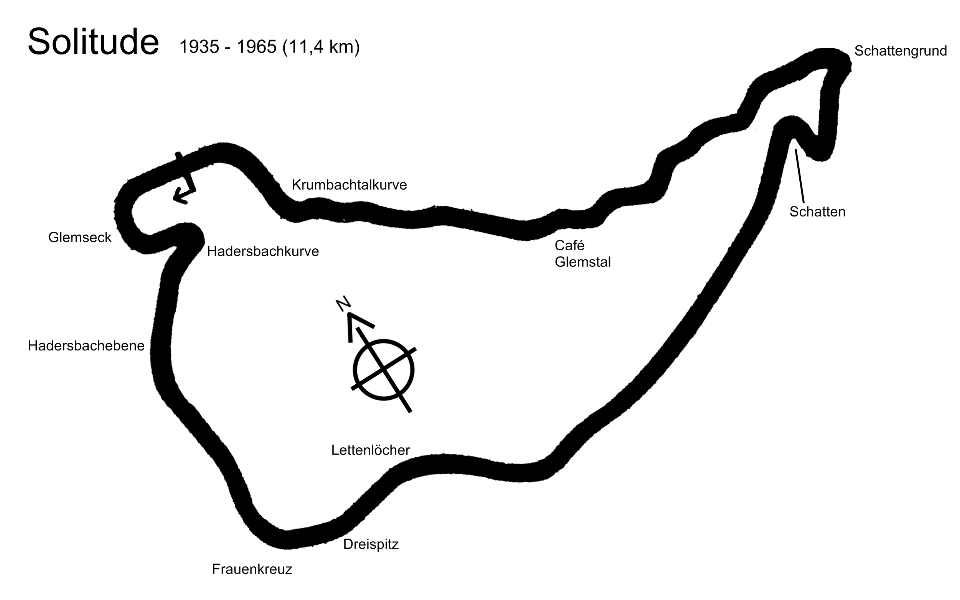

Race details
- Date: 23 July 1961
- Official name: XI Großer Preis der Solitude
- Location: Solitudering, near Stuttgart
- Course: Permanent racing facility
- Course length: 11.4086 km (7.089 miles)
- Distance: 25 laps, 285.216 km (177.225 miles)

Pole position
Driver	(Sweden) Jo Bonnier	Porsche
- Time: 4:01.1

Fastest lap
Driver	(United States) Dan Gurney	Porsche
- Time: 3:58.6

Podium
First	(United Kingdom) Innes Ireland	Lotus-Climax
Second	(Sweden) Jo Bonnier	Porsche
Third	(United States) Dan Gurney	Porsche

The 11th Solitude Grand Prix was a non-Championship motor race, run for cars complying with Formula One rules, held on 23 July 1961 at the Solitudering, near Stuttgart. The race was run over 25 laps of the circuit, and was won by Innes Ireland in a Lotus 21.

== Results ==
Pos	Driver	Entrant	Constructor	Time/Retired	Grid
1	(United Kingdom) Innes Ireland	Team Lotus	Lotus-Climax	1.41:04.6	4
2	(Sweden) Jo Bonnier	Porsche System Engineering	Porsche	+ 0.1 s	1
3	(United States) Dan Gurney	Porsche System Engineering	Porsche	+ 0.3 s	2
4	(New Zealand) Bruce McLaren	Cooper Car Company	Cooper-Climax	+ 17.9 s	3
5	(Australia) Jack Brabham	Cooper Car Company	Cooper-Climax	+ 47.6 s	8
6	(West Germany) Hans Herrmann	Porsche System Engineering	Porsche	+ 1:01.5 s	6
7	(United Kingdom) Jim Clark	Team Lotus	Lotus-Climax	+ 1:27.9 s	7
8	(West Germany) Edgar Barth	Porsche System Engineering	Porsche	+ 3:27.3	10
9	(United Kingdom) Trevor Taylor	Team Lotus	Lotus-Climax	+ 4:22.0 s	9
Ret	(United Kingdom) Stirling Moss	UDT Laystall Racing Team	Lotus-Climax	Gearbox	5
Ret	(France) Maurice Trintignant	Scuderia Serenissima	Cooper-Maserati	Engine	15
Ret	(Italy) Roberto Bussinello	Scuderia Serenissima	De Tomaso-Alfa Romeo	Engine	16
Ret	(West Germany) Wolfgang Seidel	Scuderia Colonia	Lotus-Climax	Steering wheel	14
Ret	(United Kingdom) Mike Spence	Emeryson Cars	Emeryson-Climax	Gearbox	11
Ret	(Netherlands) Carel Godin de Beaufort	Ecurie Maarsbergen	Porsche	Engine	13
Ret	(Switzerland) Piero Monteverdi	Piero Monteverdi	MBM-Porsche	Engine	17
Ret	(Switzerland) Michael May	Scuderia Colonia	Lotus-Climax	Accident	12
DNS	(United States) Lloyd Casner	Camoradi International	Lotus-Climax	Engine in practice	-
DNS	(United Kingdom) Peter Arundell	Team Lotus	Lotus-Climax	Practice only	-
WD	(West Germany) Wolfgang von Trips	SEFAC Ferrari	Ferrari		-
WD	(United States) Phil Hill	SEFAC Ferrari	Ferrari		-
WD	(Belgium) Olivier Gendebien	Equipe Nationale Belge	Emeryson-Maserati		-
WD	(Belgium) Willy Mairesse	Equipe Nationale Belge	Emeryson-Maserati		-

Previous race: 1961 British Empire Trophy	Formula One non-championship races 1961 season	Next race: 1961 Guards Trophy
Previous race: 1960 Solitude Grand Prix	Solitude Grand Prix	Next race: 1962 Solitude Grand Prix
