= JBW =

Former car manufacturer

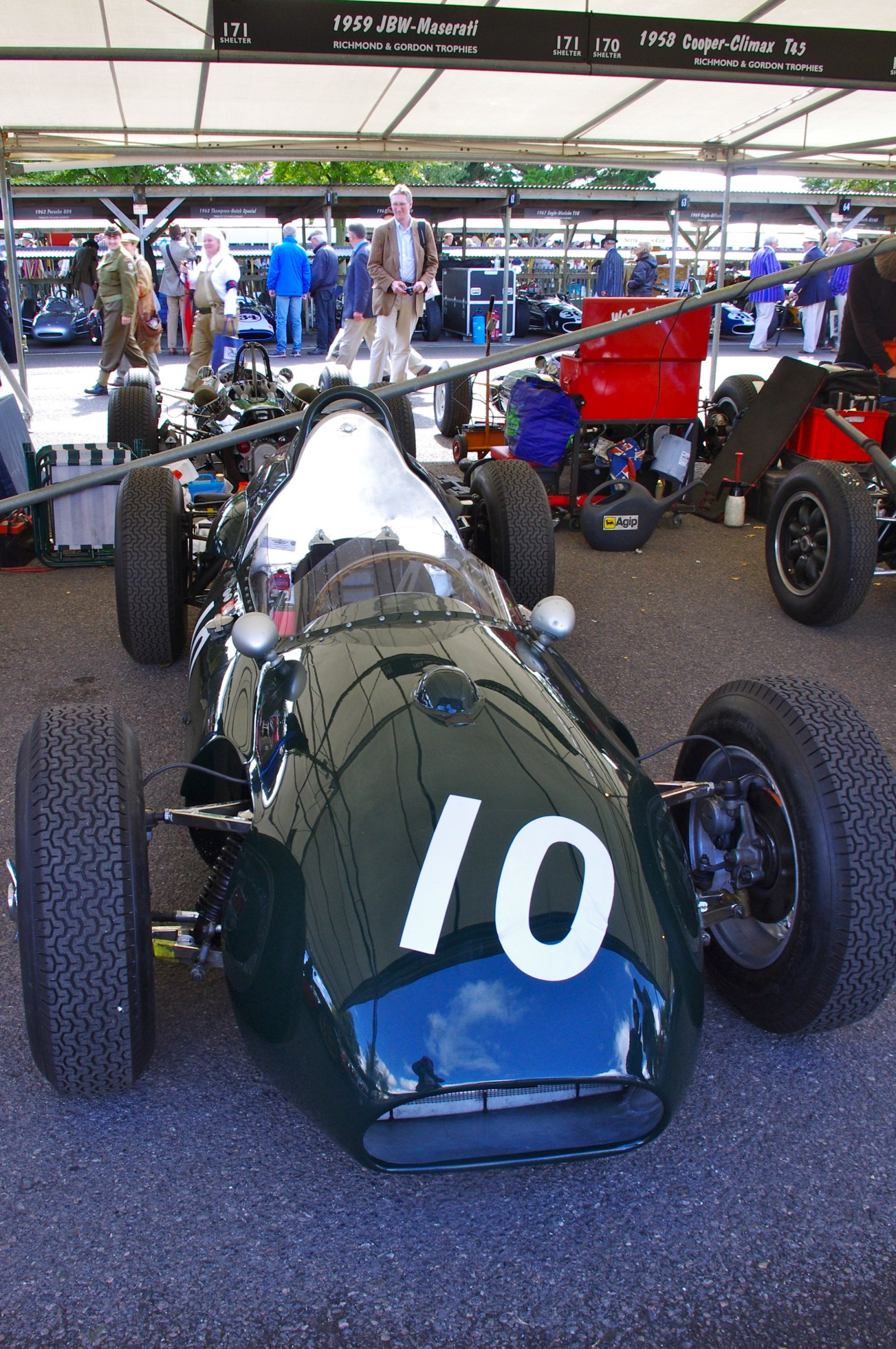
JBW Type 1 at the 2009 Silverstone Classic

JBW Cars was a British racing car manufacturer in the late 1950s, who were a Formula One constructor from 1959 to 1961.

Brian Naylor, an amateur driver from Stockport, financed his mechanic Fred Wilkinson to build a number of sports cars that were competitive against second-level national fields but were not competitive on the international stage. As well as constructing their own sports racers, JBW also prepared and entered Cooper single-seater racing cars for Naylor to drive in Formula Two and occasional Formula One events.

== Formula One ==
Following two seasons competing in Formula Two races with the JBW Cooper T43 and T45, Brian Naylor decided to enter Formula One proper in 1959. To achieve this Fred Wilkinson constructed a car — the JBW Type 1 — that was strongly influenced by the contemporary Cooper designs, and carried its Maserati 2.5 L (150 cu in) engine behind the driver. The first appearance of the JBW-Maserati was at the pre-season BRDC International Trophy non-Championship race at Silverstone, on 2 May 1959. Naylor arrived too late to post a qualifying time, and retired on lap 41 of the race with gearbox failure. On 18 July Naylor appeared in the JBW car at the 1959 British Grand Prix at Aintree. Although he managed to qualify ahead of such well known drivers as Tony Brooks, Jack Fairman and Ivor Bueb, again the JBW let Naylor down and the car's transmission failed on lap 18. One final outing that year resulted in a failure even to qualify, after Naylor suffered an accident during practice for the Gold Cup race at Oulton Park on 26 September.

The JBW Type 1 did not appear again until the following year's International Trophy race, on 14 May 1960. While Naylor and the JBW-Maserati qualified in 25th and last place, by the finish he had worked his way up to 11th position, the car lasting the distance for the first time in a competitive event. Unfortunately for Naylor, the first race of the 1960 World Championship season, the 1960 Monaco Grand Prix, was not to provide such positive results and he once again failed to qualify. However, his next race, the 1960 British Grand Prix provided Brian Naylor with his best ever Championship finish, after he came home in 13th place, having qualified in 18th place. His run of form continued at the Brands Hatch Silver City Trophy event on 1 August, where he finished 11th. Things appeared even to be looking up for the JBW team when Naylor qualified the JBW-Maserati in 7th position for the 1960 Italian Grand Prix at Monza, but his luck had begun to change and the car's gearbox failed on the 42nd lap. One further World Championship race (in the USA) and two non-Championship events in the remainder of the 1960 season all resulted in early retirements.

The JBW-Maserati had further outings in the 1961 Intercontinental Formula events, but on each occasion Naylor failed to finish. The car also ran with a 1.5-litre Maserati engine in some non-Championship events, but with no better result. For the 1961 World Championship and most other Formula One events Naylor and Wilkinson decided to switch to Coventry Climax power, and redesigned the JBW car around their FPF, 1.5 L (92 cu in) straight-4 motor. This new car — the JBW Type 2 — made its first appearance at the British Empire Trophy race at Silverstone (ironically an Intercontinental Formula event), but failed to finish. It also failed to reach the finishing flag in its only World Championship event, the 1961 Italian Grand Prix, but only a week later provided Naylor with his best ever finish when he took 9th place in the 1961 International Gold Cup at Oulton Park. Naylor only made one further appearance in the JBW-Climax, and retired on the first lap of the Brands Hatch-hosted Lewis-Evans Trophy. At the end of the 1961 season, and in increasingly poor health, Naylor retired from competition and wound up JBW Cars.

== Complete Formula One World Championship results ==
(key) (results in bold indicate pole position) (results in italics indicate fastest lap)

Year	Chassis	Engine	Tyres	Driver	1	2	3	4	5	6	7	8	9	10	11	Points	WCC
1957	Cooper T43	Climax L-4	D		ARG	MON	500	FRA	GBR	GER	PES	ITA				n/a_{1}	n/a_{1}
1957	Cooper T43	Climax L-4	D	(United Kingdom) Brian Naylor						13						n/a_{1}	n/a_{1}
1958	Cooper T45	Climax L4	D		ARG	MON	NED	500	BEL	FRA	GBR	GER	POR	ITA	MOR	n/a_{2}	n/a_{2}
1958	Cooper T45	Climax L4	D	(United Kingdom) Brian Naylor								Ret				n/a_{2}	n/a_{2}
1959	JBW Type 1	Maserati L4	D		MON	500	NED	FRA	GBR	GER	POR	ITA	USA			**0**	**NC**
1959	JBW Type 1	Maserati L4	D	(United Kingdom) Brian Naylor					Ret							**0**	**NC**
1960	JBW Type 1	Maserati L4	D		ARG	MON	500	NED	BEL	FRA	GBR	POR	ITA	USA		**0**	**NC**
1960	JBW Type 1	Maserati L4	D	(United Kingdom) Brian Naylor		DNQ					13		Ret	Ret		**0**	**NC**
1961	JBW Type 2	Climax L4	D		MON	NED	BEL	FRA	GBR	GER	ITA	USA				**0**	**NC**
1961	JBW Type 2	Climax L4	D	(United Kingdom) Brian Naylor				WD			Ret					**0**	**NC**

_{1} Constructors' Championship not awarded until 1958.
_{2} Ineligible for Constructors points.
