= Scarab (constructor) =

1950s American sports car

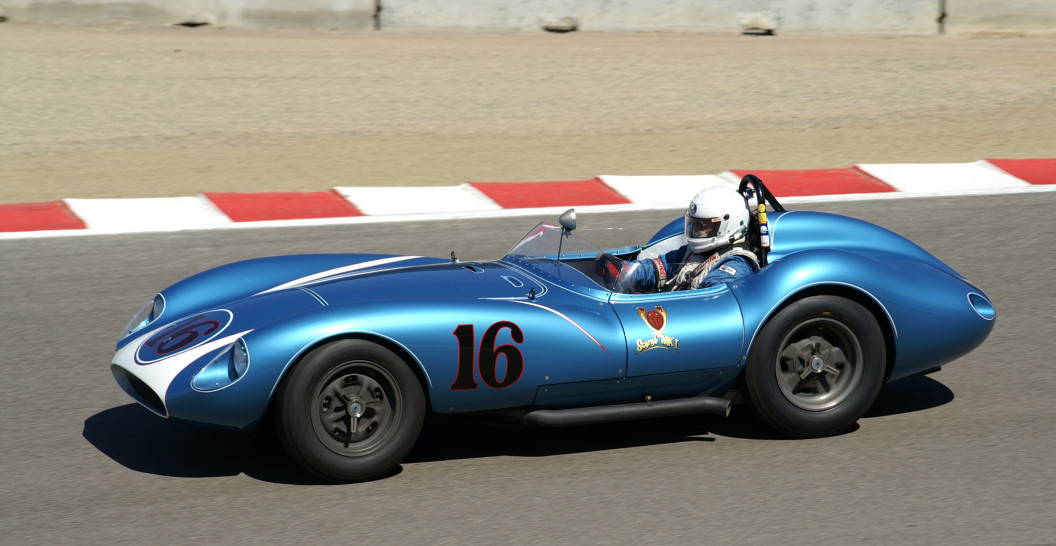
Scarab roadster #16 (left-hand drive) at the 2005 Historic races at Laguna Seca Raceway

Scarab was an American sports car and open-wheel race car constructor featuring cars designed and built by Tom Barnes and Dick Troutman for Reventlow Automobiles Inc, owned by Lance Reventlow. The Chevrolet 283 CI V-8 engines were built by Traco Engineering (Jim Travers and Frank Coon, nicknamed "The Whiz Kids").

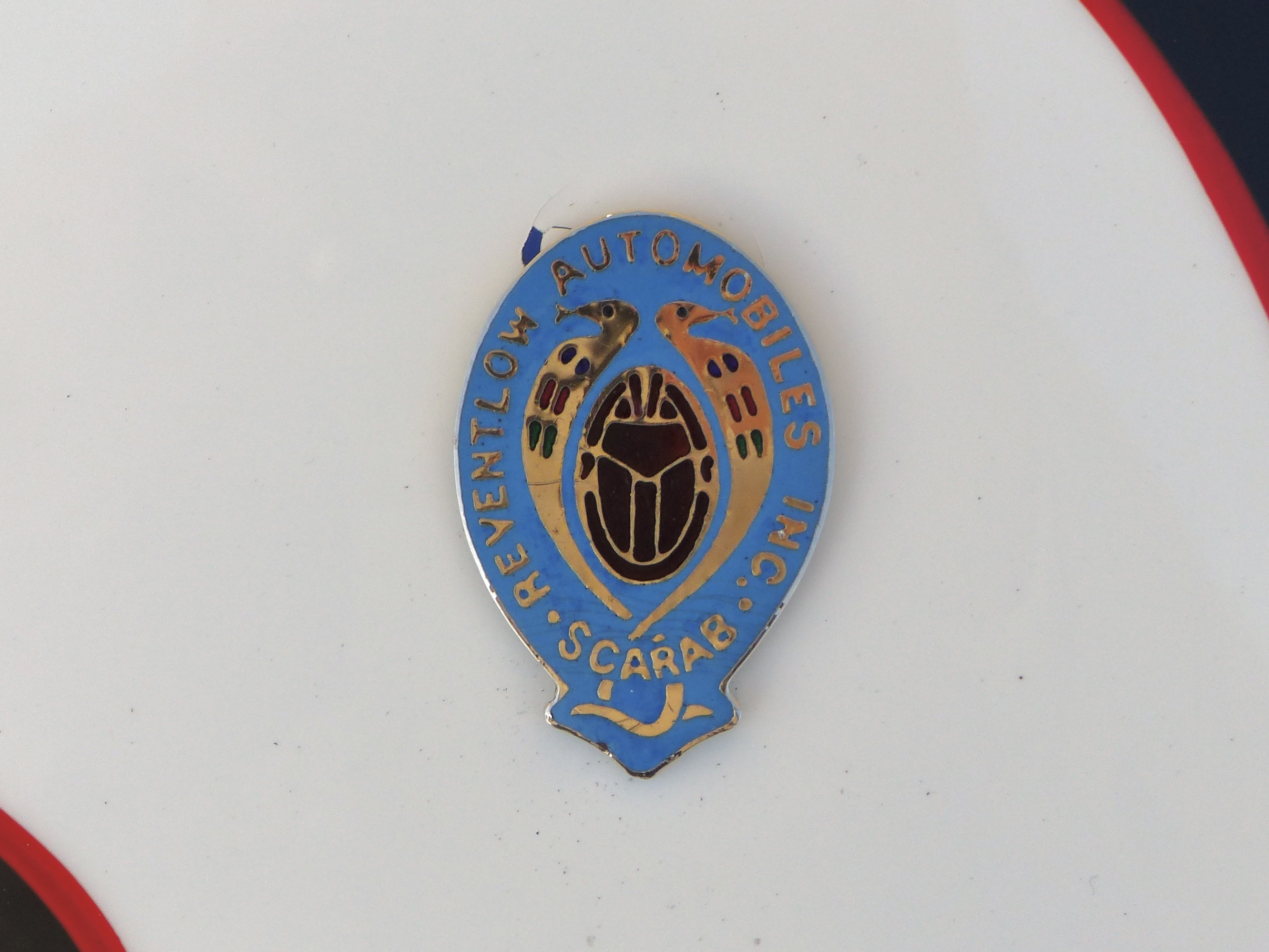
The Scarab badge

== History ==
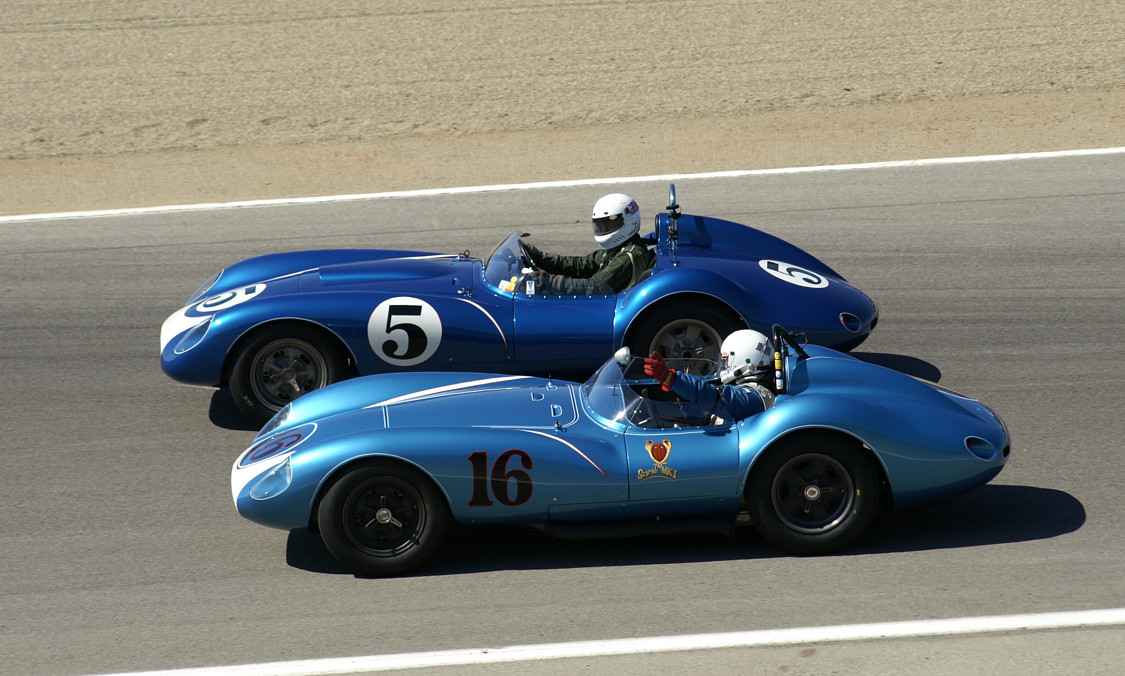
Two Scarab roadsters (#5 is right-hand drive) at the 2005 Historic races at Laguna Seca Raceway

Troutman and Barnes built sports cars for amateur road racing in the USA in the 1950s. Chuck Daigh drove the Scarab sports car to victory in the 1958 Riverside International Grand Prix, beating a field of international factory teams including famous race car driver Phil Hill and the Ferrari Team. The Scarabs won the SCCA National Championship in 1958 and two of the cars were sold in 1959 while Reventlow's race car (the only left hand drive car) was converted for his personal use on the street. Carroll Shelby drove one of the Scarab sports cars to victory at Continental Divide Raceways in Castle Rock, Colorado, setting a new course record.

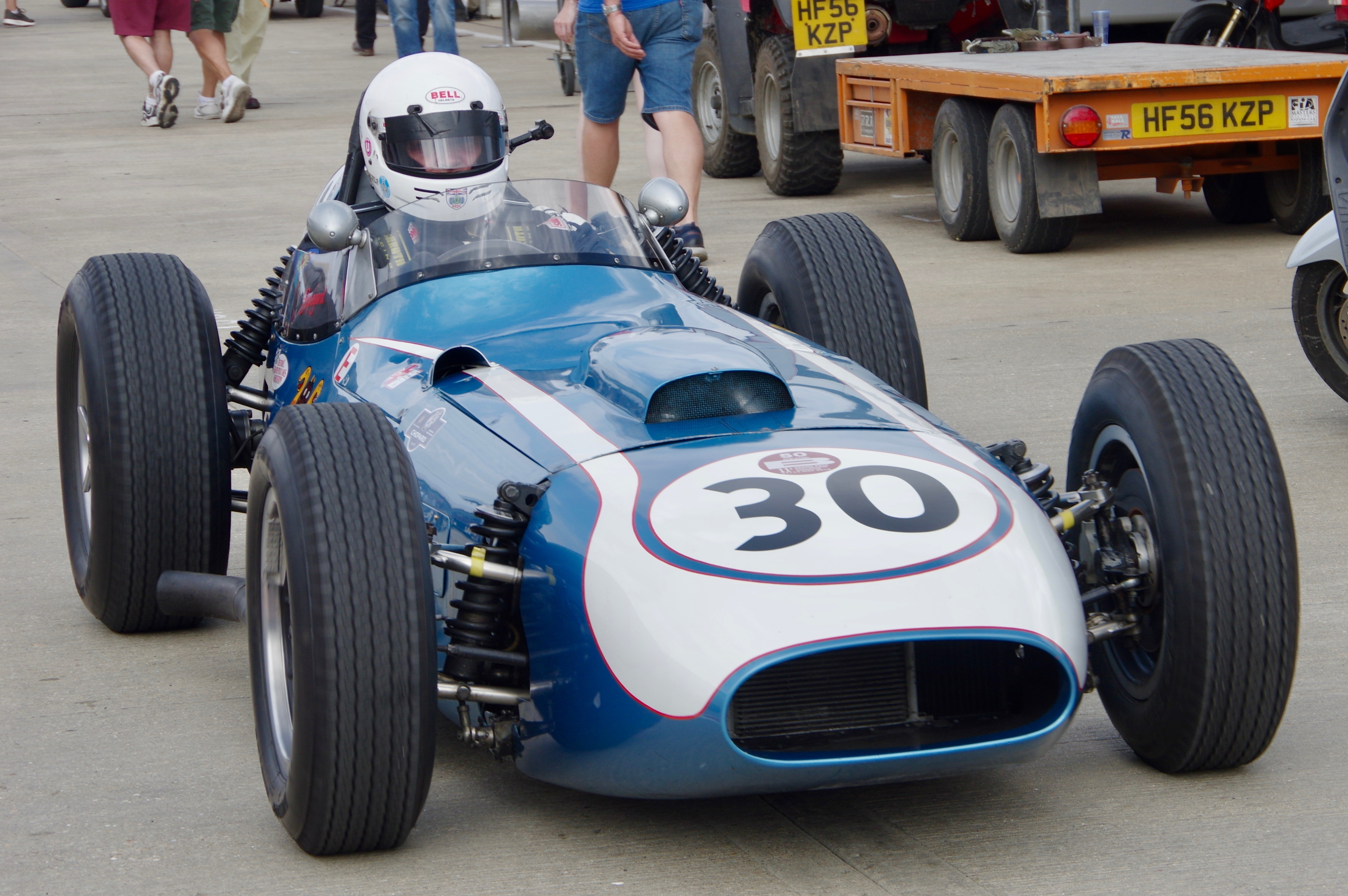
Scarab 1960 Formula One car in the 2018 Silverstone Classic.

Scarab made an ill-fated entry into Formula One during the 1960 season with front-engined cars which by then were nearly obsolete. The engines in these front-engined cars were 4-cylinder units similar in layout to the Offenhauser, but entirely of Scarab's own design penned by Leo Goossen of Offenhauser, and later Meyer-Drake fame. They featured desmodromic valve gear similar in design to that found on the Mercedes F1 engine of the 1950s and were built and maintained by Travers and Coon. The engines were the shortcoming of the team as the desmodromic gear could not cope with the large amount of movement in the engine block and would consistently pull the valves too far closed resulting in valve failure. Scarab participated in five Grands Prix, entering a total of nine cars. Reventlow and his chief mechanic Chuck Daigh drove the blue and white liveried cars. Both Scarabs were entered in the Grands Prix of Monaco (where they suffered hydraulic brake fluid aeration problems and did not qualify for the race), Holland, Belgium, and France (where both Daigh and Ginther experienced oil starvation issues resulting in burnt bearings), while only Daigh's car was entered in the final race of the 1960 F1 season, the American Grand Prix at Riverside, California (the Scarabs' home track). Daigh finished because he had to keep the engine RPM under 6000 to prevent fuel delivery problems (vapor lock) on the hot southern California day and, in doing so, did not encounter the mysterious oil starvation issue that occurred closer to 7000 RPM that had plagued the Scarabs previously. Daigh, while entered in the Dutch Grand Prix, did not race due to qualification/appearance payment issues.

== Intercontinental Formula racing ==
The following year Chuck Daigh went on to pilot one of the Scarabs in Intercontinental Formula racing in Europe powered by the Offenhauser, Indy style, engine where he finished eighth, at Goodwood vying for the Lavant Cup, and finished seventh in a bid for the International Trophy. This was a third front engine car, originally built for the F1 effort. Before the season was out Daigh crashed badly at a race in Silverstone where the car was destroyed and left in Europe.

Scarab built one rear engine car for the 1962 season, powered by a Buick aluminum V-8 with Phil Remington fabricated intake and exhaust manifolds. However, the final FIA engine rules made the necessary engine modifications illegal and the car was never raced in Europe. Daigh raced this car only once, in the 1962 Sandown International Cup, a Formula Libre race at Sandown Park in Australia. He finished fourth after an epic battle with Stirling Moss where the Buick-engined Scarab was faster on the straights and Moss's car would overtake in the corners. The Buick engine was sold by the team (Warren Olsen team manager) before returning to the USA.

== The last Scarab car ==
Finally, a mid-engined two-seat sports car was built. They put another Buick V8 engine in this car and Reventlow wanted to test it on the streets of Los Angeles. So, he went to the California Department of Motor Vehicles and (after installing a muffler) managed to get license plates for this all-out racing car. He personally raced the car (without muffler) three times and his best finish was second at Santa Barbara.

Reventlow was planning on closing down the Scarab operation so he sold this little sports racing car to John Mecom Jr. of Houston, Texas. Mecom installed a Traco-built 327 Chevy engine and put A.J. Foyt in the car. Foyt's best result was winning a pair of races at Nassau, Bahamas during 1963. Walt Hansgen won the 1964 Bridgehampton 500 in the car while it was Chevrolet powered. Augie Pabst purchased the car and was still the owner as of 2013. The car was also used in the 2026 Historic Grand Prix of Monaco where it won in the A2 class.

== Complete Formula One World Championship results ==
(key)

Year	Chassis	Engine	Tyres	Drivers	1	2	3	4	5	6	7	8	9	10	Points	WCC
1960	Scarab F1	Scarab L4	D		ARG	MON	500	NED	BEL	FRA	GBR	POR	ITA	USA	0	-
1960	Scarab F1	Scarab L4	D	Chuck Daigh	DNA	DNQ		DNS	Ret	DNS				10	0	-
1960	Scarab F1	Scarab L4	D	Lance Reventlow		DNQ		DNS	Ret						0	-
1960	Scarab F1	Scarab L4	D	Richie Ginther						DNS					0	-
