= Yeoman Credit Racing =

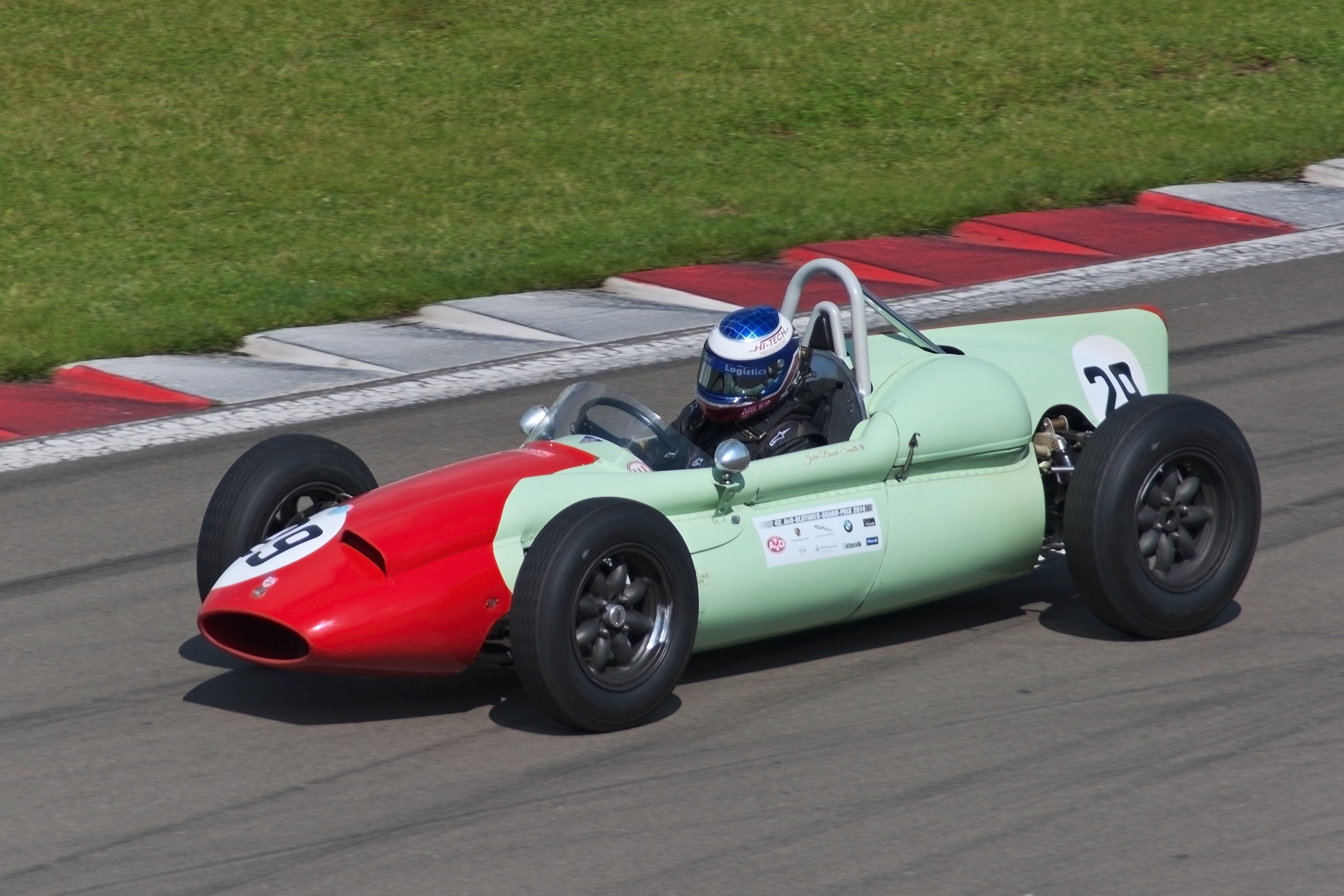
A Cooper T51 Formula One car, in the distinctive 1960 livery of the British Racing Partnership-run Yeoman Credit Racing team

Yeoman Credit Racing was a name used by two different Formula One motor racing teams in the early-1960s: the British Racing Partnership (1960); and Reg Parnell Racing (1961–62). The name was derived from commercial sponsorship arrangements, the first time that a Formula One racing team had changed their name in deference to sponsorship.

== Brief history ==
The first team to benefit from this commercial relationship was the British Racing Partnership, run by Ken Gregory and Alfred Moss, who were sponsored by Yeoman Credit Ltd. from August 1959. Yeoman Credit was a finance company founded by Joseph Samengo-Turner in the mid-1950s. By 1959/60 the company was being run by Joseph's sons Paul, William and Fabian. With an expanding business in financing retail motor sales, the Samengo-Turner brothers were looking at new ways of advertising Yeoman Credit. This led to a meeting with Ken Gregory of the British Racing Partnership, which resulted in the formation of the first fully sponsored Formula One Grand Prix Team – giving Yeoman Credit the opportunity to secure profile advertising in the press and on television.

Initially the team entered Formula Two, with only occasional Formula One races, but in 1960 they made the step to concentrate on a three-car Formula One team running 1959 Cooper T51s, with mixed success. Unfortunately, during this time two of the team's drivers (Harry Schell and Chris Bristow) were killed while racing their cars.

In September 1960 the Yeoman Credit Racing identity and sponsorship funds were moved by the Samengo-Turner brothers to the newly formed Reg Parnell Racing team, as relations between BRP and Yeoman Credit had broken down. BRP had to find a new sponsor and sourced new funding from the United Dominions Trust, a competitor of Yeoman Credit in the financing of retail motor sales. The Yeoman Credit team continued, now in its new dark-blue-and-red liveried Cooper T53s, during 1961. Despite a good start to the season with John Surtees winning the Glover Trophy at Goodwood (the first 1.5 litre non-championship Formula One race), results did not come as expected.

=== Bowmaker Racing ===
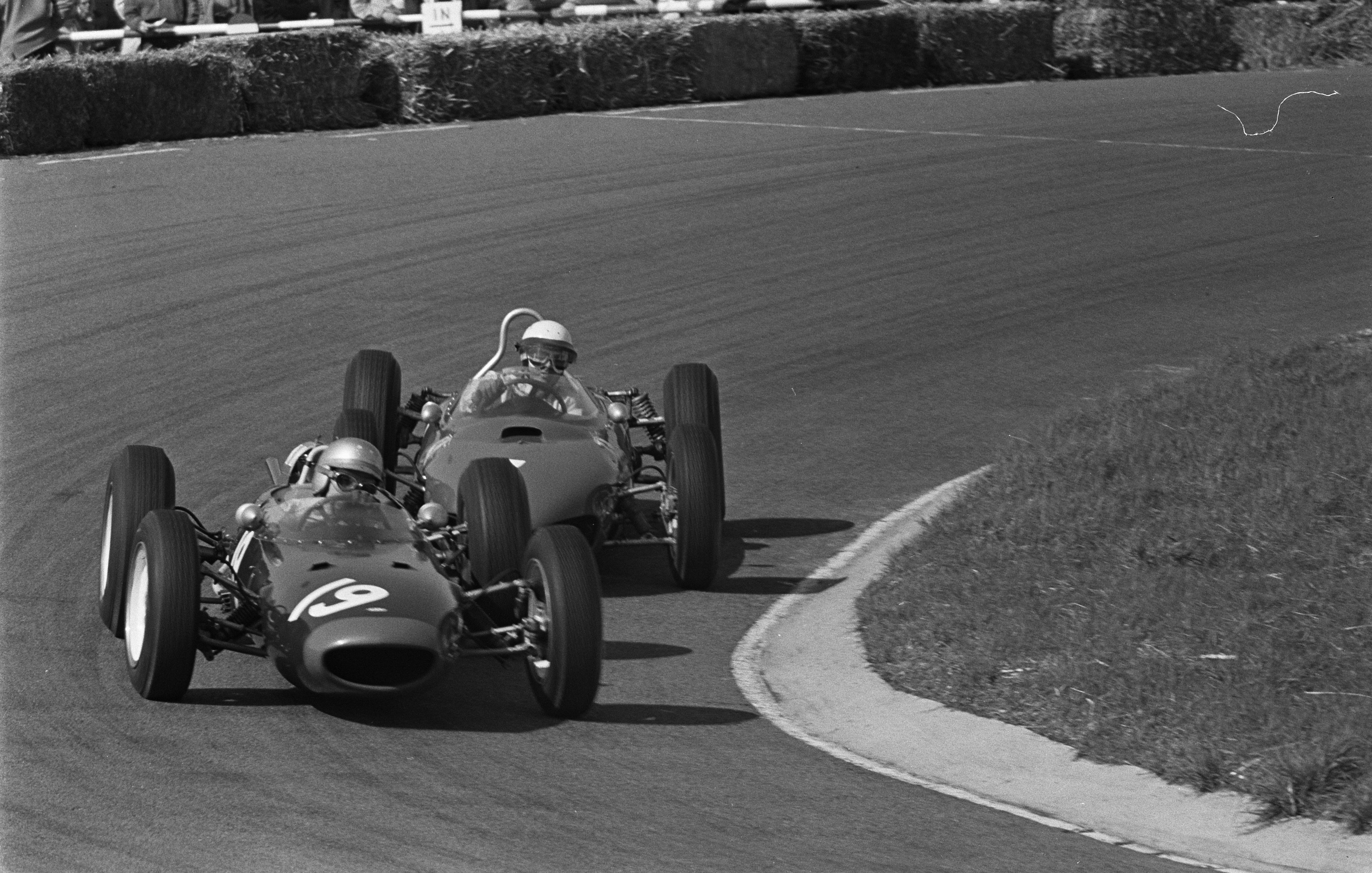
John Surtees contesting the 1962 Dutch Grand Prix in a Bowmaker Racing entered Lola Mk4

For 1962 the Yeoman Credit's parent company, Bowmaker Limited, decided that the team's name should be changed to Bowmaker Racing. The team decided to invest in a new car which was commissioned from Eric Broadley's Lola Cars company and was the first Formula One design to emerge from the Lola stable. However, Broadley's Lola Mk4 cars did not prove as competitive as had been hoped. Despite full works support from the Lola factory and pole position for their first race, the Dutch Grand Prix, Bowmaker withdrew their financial support before the start of the 1963 Formula One season. Reg Parnell Racing survived the loss of funds, and the death of owner Reg Parnell himself in 1964, and eventually merged with the British Racing Motors works team in the late 1960s.

== Complete Formula One World Championship results ==
(key)

Year	Chassis	Engine(s)	Tyres	Driver	1	2	3	4	5	6	7	8	9	10	WDC	Points
1960	Cooper T51	Climax Straight-4	D		ARG	MON	500	NED	BEL	FRA	GBR	POR	ITA	USA		
1960	Cooper T51	Climax Straight-4	D	(United Kingdom) Chris Bristow		Ret		Ret	Ret						-	0
1960	Cooper T51	Climax Straight-4	D	(United Kingdom) Tony Brooks		4		Ret	Ret		5	5		Ret	11th	7
1960	Cooper T51	Climax Straight-4	D	(United Kingdom) Henry Taylor				7		4	8	DNS		14	22nd	3
1960	Cooper T51	Climax Straight-4	D	(Belgium) Olivier Gendebien					3	2	9	7		12	6th	10
1960	Cooper T51	Climax Straight-4	D	(United Kingdom) Bruce Halford						8					-	0
1960	Cooper T51	Climax Straight-4	D	(United States) Phil Hill										6	5th*	16*
1961	Cooper T53	Climax Straight-4	D		MON	NED	BEL	FRA	GBR	GER	ITA	USA				
1961	Cooper T53	Climax Straight-4	D	(United Kingdom) John Surtees	11	7	5	Ret	Ret	5	Ret	Ret			12th	4
1961	Cooper T53	Climax Straight-4	D	(United Kingdom) Roy Salvadori				8	6	10	6	Ret			17th	2
1962	Lola Mk4	Climax V8	D		NED	MON	BEL	FRA	GBR	GER	ITA	USA	RSA			
1962	Lola Mk4	Climax V8	D	(United Kingdom) John Surtees	Ret	4	5	5	2	2	Ret	Ret	Ret		4th	19
1962	Lola Mk4	Climax V8	D	(United Kingdom) Roy Salvadori	Ret	Ret		Ret	Ret	Ret	Ret	DNS	Ret		NC	0
