= Brian Naylor (racing driver) =

British racing driver (1923–1989)

- Born: 24 March 1923; Salford, Lancashire, England
- Died: 8 August 1989 (aged 66); Marbella, Andalusia, Spain

Formula One World Championship career
- Nationality: (United Kingdom) British
- Active years: 1957–1961
- Team(s): privateer Cooper and JBW
- Entries: 8 (7 starts)
- Championships: 0
- Wins: 0
- Podiums: 0
- Career points: 0
- Pole positions: 0
- Fastest laps: 0
- First entry: 1958 German Grand Prix
- Last entry: 1961 Italian Grand Prix

John Brian Naylor (24 March 1923 – 8 August 1989) was a British racing driver from England. He participated in seven Formula One World Championship Grands Prix, debuting on 3 August 1958. He scored no championship points.

The son of a wealthy Stockport motor dealer, Naylor financed the building of his own Cooper-based JBW car, which he raced in several grands prix, although the car was out of its depth at that level.

Naylor finished 42nd in the 1961 Daytona 500, becoming the first European driver to compete in NASCAR.

== Motorsports career results ==
(key)

=== Complete Formula One World Championship results ===
Year	Entrant	Chassis	Engine	1	2	3	4	5	6	7	8	9	10	11	WDC	Points
1957	J B Naylor	Cooper T43 F2	Climax Straight-4	ARG	MON	500	FRA	GBR	GER; 13	PES	ITA				NC	0
1958	J B Naylor	Cooper T45 F2	Climax Straight-4	ARG	MON	NED	500	BEL	FRA	GBR	GER; Ret	POR	ITA	MOR	NC	0
1959	J B Naylor	JBW	Maserati Straight-4	MON	500	NED	FRA	GBR; Ret	GER	POR	ITA	USA			NC	0
1960	J B Naylor	JBW	Maserati Straight-4	ARG	MON; DNQ	500	NED	BEL	FRA	GBR; 13	POR	ITA; Ret	USA; Ret		NC	0
1961	J B Naylor	JBW	Climax Straight-4	MON	NED	BEL	FRA; WD	GBR	GER	ITA; Ret	USA				NC	0

=== NASCAR Grand National Series ===
NASCAR Grand National Series results
Year	Team/Owner	No.	Make	1	2	3	4	5	6	7	8	9	10	11	12	13	14	15	16	17	18	19	20	21	22	23	24	25	26	27	28	29	30	31	32	33	34	35	36	37	38	39	40	41	42	43	44	45	46	47	48	49	50	51	52	NGNC	Pts	Ref.
1961	Fred Lovette	78	Pontiac				DAY 32	DAY DNQ																																																n/a	n/a	
1961	Warner Brothers	36	Ford					DAY 42																																																n/a	n/a	
