= Henry Taylor (racing driver) =

British racing driver (1932–2013)

- Born: 16 December 1932; Shefford, Bedfordshire, England, UK
- Died: 24 October 2013 (aged 80); Vallauris, France

Formula One World Championship career
- Nationality: (United Kingdom) British
- Active years: 1959–1961
- Team(s): non-works Cooper, Lotus
- Entries: 11 (8 starts)
- Championships: 0
- Wins: 0
- Podiums: 0
- Career points: 3
- Pole positions: 0
- Fastest laps: 0
- First entry: 1959 British Grand Prix
- Last entry: 1961 Italian Grand Prix

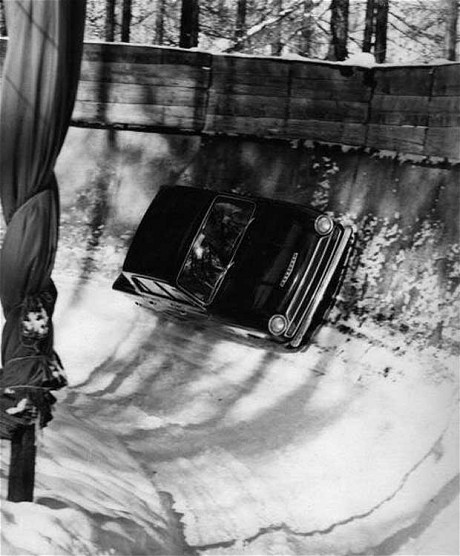
Taylor driving a Ford Cortina down the bobsleigh run at Cortina d'Ampezzo

Henry Charles Taylor (16 December 1932 – 24 October 2013) was a British racing driver from England.

== Racing career ==
Born in Shefford, Bedfordshire, Taylor started his career in speedway in East London before switching to a 500cc Formula Three Cooper in 1954, quickly demonstrating his talent. He won two Formula Three championships in 1955, and repeated the achievement in 1956, taking 15 wins. He drove in sports car racing as well, winning in a Jaguar D-Type. Continuing his winning ways in Formula Two in 1958, while scoring several good placings in the UK and in France, he soon graduated to Grand Prix racing.

Taylor participated in 11 Formula One World Championship Grands Prix, scoring three championship points, with his best result at the 1960 French Grand Prix, a fourth place in his Cooper T51. That year, he also drove for Ken Tyrrell's Formula Junior team, winning twice. He found less success in the following season's World Championship Grands Prix, but finished second twice in domestic Formula One races, among other strong results. Not long after a serious accident in the 1961 British Grand Prix, Taylor turned away from single-seater racing and took up rallying, taking part in the Monte Carlo Rally.

For the following four seasons, Taylor rallied a Ford Anglia, drove the Ford Cortina on its rally debut, and also campaigned the highly successful Lotus Cortina, which he also raced in the European Touring Car Championship in 1964. He achieved a number of top six placings in rallies with all three cars, and took two second places in ETCC races.

After retiring from rallying in 1965, Taylor became Ford's Competition Manager. He also drove for the British Olympic bobsleigh team.

== Death ==
Taylor died on 24 October 2013 in Vallauris, France after a long battle with ill health.

== Racing record ==
=== Complete Formula One World Championship results ===
(key)

Year	Entrant	Chassis	Engine	1	2	3	4	5	6	7	8	9	10	WDC	Points
1959	RHH Parnell	Cooper T51 F2	Climax Straight-4	MON	500	NED	FRA	GBR; 11	GER	POR	ITA	USA		NC	0
1960	Yeoman Credit Racing Team	Cooper T51	Climax Straight-4	ARG	MON	500	NED; 7	BEL	FRA; 4	GBR; 8	POR; DNS	ITA	USA; 14	22nd	3
1961	UDT Laystall Racing Team	Lotus 18	Climax Straight-4	MON; DNQ	NED									NC	0
1961	UDT Laystall Racing Team	Lotus 18/21	Climax Straight-4			BEL; DNP	FRA; 10	GBR; Ret	GER	ITA; 11	USA			NC	0

=== Complete British Saloon Car Championship results ===
(key) (Races in bold indicate pole position; races in italics indicate fastest lap.)

Year	Team	Car	Class	1	2	3	4	5	6	7	8	9	10	11	DC	Pts	Class
1963	Alan Andrews Racing	Ford Anglia Super	A	SNE	OUL	GOO	AIN	SIL	CRY	SIL	BRH; 15	BRH	OUL	SNE	NC	0	NC
