= Intercontinental Formula =

Class of motor-racing in England in 1961

- Category: Single-seater
- Country: International (effectively United Kingdom)
- Inaugural season: 1961
- Folded: 1961
- Last Drivers' champion: (United Kingdom) Stirling Moss (unofficial)

Intercontinental Formula was an open wheel, single-seater motor-racing formula introduced in 1961 to continue racing with the 2.5-litre engines used until 1960 in Formula One while the 1961 Formula One season introduced a engine capacity limit of only 1.5-litres.

Originally conceived as an alternative to the new small engine Formula One regulations, the series failed to establish itself globally despite allowing engines up to 3.0 litres. The attempt to run it as a long-term championship collapsed after just half a season, with all races taking place in the United Kingdom on tracks not visited by Formula One, which raced in Aintree.

== History ==
=== Background ===
The introduction of the Intercontinental Formula stemmed from a regulatory change in Formula One. Until the 1960 season, regulations allowed engines with a maximum displacement of 2.5 litres, as well as 750cc supercharged ones which never showed up. In late 1958, the CSI, the regulatory body for motorsport of the FIA, announced that starting from the 1961 season, regulations would align with the existing Formula 2: only naturally aspirated engines between 1.3 and 1.5 litres would be permitted, with a minimum car weight of 450 kg.

British constructors, often referred to as the "Garagistes", were unhappy with these changes. The main proponents were Cooper, Lotus, supported by their 4-cylinder engine supplier Coventry Climax, as well as BRM which built its own 4-cylinder engine. They initially threatened to boycott the 1961 World Championship as they felt the new rules favoured established sportscar factories such as Ferrari and Porsche, who had dominated the 1.5-litre Formula 2 class.

Anticipating a failure of or in the new 1.5-litre Formula One, British single-seater constructors developed plans for an alternative series that effectively continued the existing regulations. Initially, Ferrari also expressed interest. The plan was to hold races in the UK, Italy, and eventually the United States; this international scope gave rise to the name Intercontinental Formula.

=== Collapse of the project ===
However, interest waned rapidly and early. After having won the 1960 Italian Grand Prix at the banked oval version of Monza, which was boycotted by the British teams that already secured the championship, Ferrari surprisingly announced that for 1961 they would commit fully to the new Formula One regulations, following promising tests of their 1.5-litre V6 Ferrari Dino engine. Shortly after, Coventry Climax also withdrew support for the project to concentrate manufacturing capacity on new V8 engines for 1.5 litre F1. Negotiations with Italian circuits subsequently failed, effectively confining the series to British tracks.

Only five races were run under the formula, three between March and May before the F1 WC season started, and two more in July and August 1961. BRM and Lotus entered official works cars, while other competitors were privateer entrants. All races were won by the Cooper T53-Climax model; two by Jack Brabham and three by Stirling Moss.

With the success of the new Formula One series and the arrival of competitive British 1.5 litre V8 engines, Intercontinental Formula was abandoned at the end of the year. Some of the cars belatedly became intercontinental as they were sold to drivers in Australia and New Zealand, where they competed under similar regulations, serving as precursors to the Tasman Series established in 1964.

== Regulations ==
The technical regulations largely mirrored those of Formula One prior to 1961. The main difference was the maximum engine displacement, which was increased to 3.0 litres. This allowed teams to enlarge their existing 2.5-litre engines, widening the gap to the small 1.5 litre F1. It also opened the door for American stock-block derived engines, a concept that did not materialize during the short life of the series, but later resulted in the Repco-Brabham V8 and Formula 5000. The teams demanded a "return to power" of F1 from the CSI/FIA, asking for an increase to 3.0 litres expecting to get a 2.0 or 2.5 litre compromise, but the CSI actually allowed 3.0 litres on short terms for the 1966 Formula One season, which caught all teams unprepared.

== Race results ==
The inaugural Intercontinental Formula race at Snetterton to place late in March, nearly two months before the 1961 F1 season started at Monaco, and on the same weekend as the 1961 12 Hours of Sebring in which many of the top F1 drivers competed. The Intercontinental race featured a mixed grid of 14 cars from almost exclusively Cooper and Lotus: alongside Intercontinental cars, new 1.5-litre Formula One or older F2 cars were also admitted, and some teams used the opportunity to test their new constructions. Although the top two finishers (Jack Brabham and Cliff Allison) were driving Intercontinental cars, the rest of the finishers consisted of F1 or F2 machinery. Meanwhile, Australian Brabham became truly Intercontinental as he took the European Cooper to a 9th place in the American 1961 Indianapolis 500 that allowed bigger engines than Climax provided.

The second race at Goodwood was the first exclusive to the class, but only 9 entries showed up as the date collided with the 1961 Pau Grand Prix which mainly saw F1 cars but also allowed larger engines. After the third race, the F1 season started, and it showed dominance of the rear-mid engine layout that had been pioneered by Porsche and taken to F1 Championships by Cooper. Only Moss in the nimble Lotus-Climax could keep up with the new mid-engine Ferrari 156 F1, while the perennial Intercontinental winner and defending F1 World Champion constructor Cooper-Climax ranked 4th even behind Porsche with its aging Porsche 718/2, a 1957 sportscar converted to F2 converted to F1.

Both Climax and BRM focussed on their new high revving 1.5 litre V8 engines that powered sleek mid-engine single-seaters that soon beat the lap records of the 2.5 litre era. The Intercontinental cars and races were obsolete. As a result of the new V8 engines and matching chassis, four British teams dominated the 1962 F1 season, sending winless Ferrari back to the drawing board, and Porsche back to sportscar racing despite having scored one Championship GP win with the new Porsche 804 flat-8 engine car.

The table below details the results. The rows in pink indicate races that were not valid for the championship points.

| Round | Race Name | Circuit | Date | Pole position | Fastest lap | Winning driver | Winning constructor | Report |
|---|---|---|---|---|---|---|---|---|
| 1 | II Lombank Trophy^{1} | Snetterton | 26 March 1961 | (United Kingdom) Innes Ireland | (United Kingdom) Innes Ireland | (Australia) Jack Brabham | Cooper-Climax | Report |
| 2 | XIII Lavant Cup | Goodwood | 3 April 1961 | (New Zealand) Bruce McLaren | (New Zealand) Bruce McLaren | (United Kingdom) Stirling Moss | Cooper-Climax | Report |
| 3 | XIII BRDC International Trophy | Silverstone | 6 May 1961 | Not available | (United Kingdom) Stirling Moss | (United Kingdom) Stirling Moss | Cooper-Climax | Report |
| 4 | XXIII British Empire Trophy | Silverstone | 8 July 1961 | (United Kingdom) John Surtees | (United Kingdom) Stirling Moss | (United Kingdom) Stirling Moss | Cooper-Climax | Report |
| 5 | Guards Trophy | Brands Hatch | 7 August 1961 | (United Kingdom) Stirling Moss | (New Zealand) Bruce McLaren | (Australia) Jack Brabham | Cooper-Climax | Report |

^{1} Run in conjunction with Formula One entries.

== Championship standings (Unofficial) ==
The championship was discontinued after the Guards Trophy and no official drivers' trophy was awarded. Based on the points system used at the time (excluding the first two non-championship rounds), Stirling Moss would have won the series.

Points System
| Position | 1st | 2nd | 3rd | 4th | 5th | 6th |
|---|---|---|---|---|---|---|
| Points | 9 | 6 | 4 | 3 | 2 | 1 |

| Pos. | Driver | (United Kingdom) INT | (United Kingdom) EMP | (United Kingdom) GUA | Points |
|---|---|---|---|---|---|
| 1 | (United Kingdom) Stirling Moss | 9 | 9 | - | 18 |
| 2 | (Australia) Jack Brabham | 6 | 0 | 9 | 15 |
| 3 | (United Kingdom) Graham Hill | 0 | 4 | 4 | 8 |
| = | (United Kingdom) John Surtees | 2 | 6 | 0 | 8 |
| = | (United Kingdom) Jim Clark | 0 | 2 | 6 | 8 |
| 6 | (New Zealand) Bruce McLaren | 0 | 3 | 3 | 6 |
| = | (United Kingdom) Roy Salvadori | 4 | 0 | 2 | 6 |
| 8 | (United Kingdom) Henry Taylor | 3 | 0 | 0 | 3 |
| 9 | (United Kingdom) Tony Brooks | 1 | 0 | 0 | 1 |
| 10 | (Australia) Lex Davison | 0 | 0 | 1 | 1 |

== Bibliography ==
- Aston, Beverley; Mark Williams (1996). Playing to win: The success of UK motorsport Engineering. Institute for Public Policy Research. ISBN 1-86030-031-6.
- Cimarosti, Adriano (1997). Das Jahrhundert des Rennsports (in German). Stuttgart: Motorbuch Verlag. ISBN 3-613-01848-9.
- Hodges, David (1993). Rennwagen von A–Z nach 1945 (in German). Stuttgart: Motorbuch Verlag. ISBN 3-613-01477-7.
- Lawrence, Mike (1998). Grand Prix Cars 1945–1965. Motor Racing Publications. ISBN 1-899870-39-3.
