= Tony Marsh (racing driver) =

British racing driver (1931–2009)

- Born: 20 July 1931; Stourbridge, Worcestershire, England
- Died: 7 May 2009 (aged 77); Portsmouth, Hampshire, England

Formula One World Championship career
- Nationality: (United Kingdom) British
- Active years: 1957–1958, 1961
- Team(s): privateer Cooper and Lotus
- Entries: 5 (4 starts)
- Championships: 0
- Wins: 0
- Podiums: 0
- Career points: 0
- Pole positions: 0
- Fastest laps: 0
- First entry: 1957 German Grand Prix
- Last entry: 1961 German Grand Prix

Anthony Ernest Marsh (20 July 1931 – 7 May 2009) was a British racing driver from England. His Formula One career was short and unsuccessful, but he enjoyed great success in hillclimbing, winning the British Hill Climb Championship on a record six occasions.

Having begun his hillclimbing career in 1953 with a Cooper-JAP that had previously been driven by Peter Collins, he won three successive championships in the car from 1955 to 1957. In the 1960s, he drove an ex-Formula One BRM for a time before constructing his own Marsh car. Inspired by Peter Westbury's Ferguson P99, Marsh devised an unusual drivetrain which utilised four-wheel-drive while accelerating but rear-wheel-drive while cornering.

Once again Tony Marsh established himself in 1965 as "King of the Hills" by scoring Best Time of the Day at eight of the nine first championship climbs he entered, and setting new course records at Shelsley Walsh, Bouley Bay and Longleat.

After winning another hat-trick of championships between 1965 and 1967, Marsh sold his car and left motorsport to concentrate on his engineering and farming interests, but in 1986 he returned at the wheel of the March-based Rovercraft. In 1993, his co-driver Simon Law was killed in the car during the Brighton Speed Trials, a tragedy which affected Marsh considerably. He returned with the ex-David Render Toleman TG191 Cosworth DFL, taking the Gurston Top Six title that year, aged 62. He continued to compete in hillclimbs well into his seventies, driving on until 2008.

Marsh competed in circuit racing in his earlier years, driving in four Grands Prix, the last being the 1961 German Grand Prix in which he drove the Lotus 18 he also campaigned in hillclimbs. He also drove in the 1960 Le Mans 24 Hours, sharing a Lotus Elite with John Wagstaff.

In 2007, Parley Books published his autobiography: Tony Marsh: The great all-rounder: In and out of motorsport.

Marsh was born in Stourbridge; he died aged 77 in May 2009 after having been admitted to hospital with breathing complications.

== Complete Formula One World Championship results ==
(key)

Year	Entrant	Chassis	Engine	1	2	3	4	5	6	7	8	9	10	11	WDC	Points
1957	Ridgeway Managements	Cooper T43 F2	Climax Straight-4	ARG	MON	500	FRA	GBR	GER; 15	PES	ITA				NC	0
1958	Tony Marsh	Cooper T45 F2	Climax Straight-4	ARG	MON	NED	500	BEL	FRA	GBR	GER; 8	POR	ITA	MOR	NC	0
1961	Tony Marsh	Lotus 18	Climax Straight-4	MON	NED	BEL; DNS	FRA	GBR; Ret	GER; 15	ITA	USA				NC	0

Sporting positions
Preceded by Ken Wharton	British Hill Climb Champion; 1955-1957	Succeeded by David Boshier-Jones
Preceded by Peter Westbury	British Hill Climb Champion; 1965-1967	Succeeded by Peter Lawson
