= Lance Reventlow =

American racing driver and entrepreneur (1936–1972)

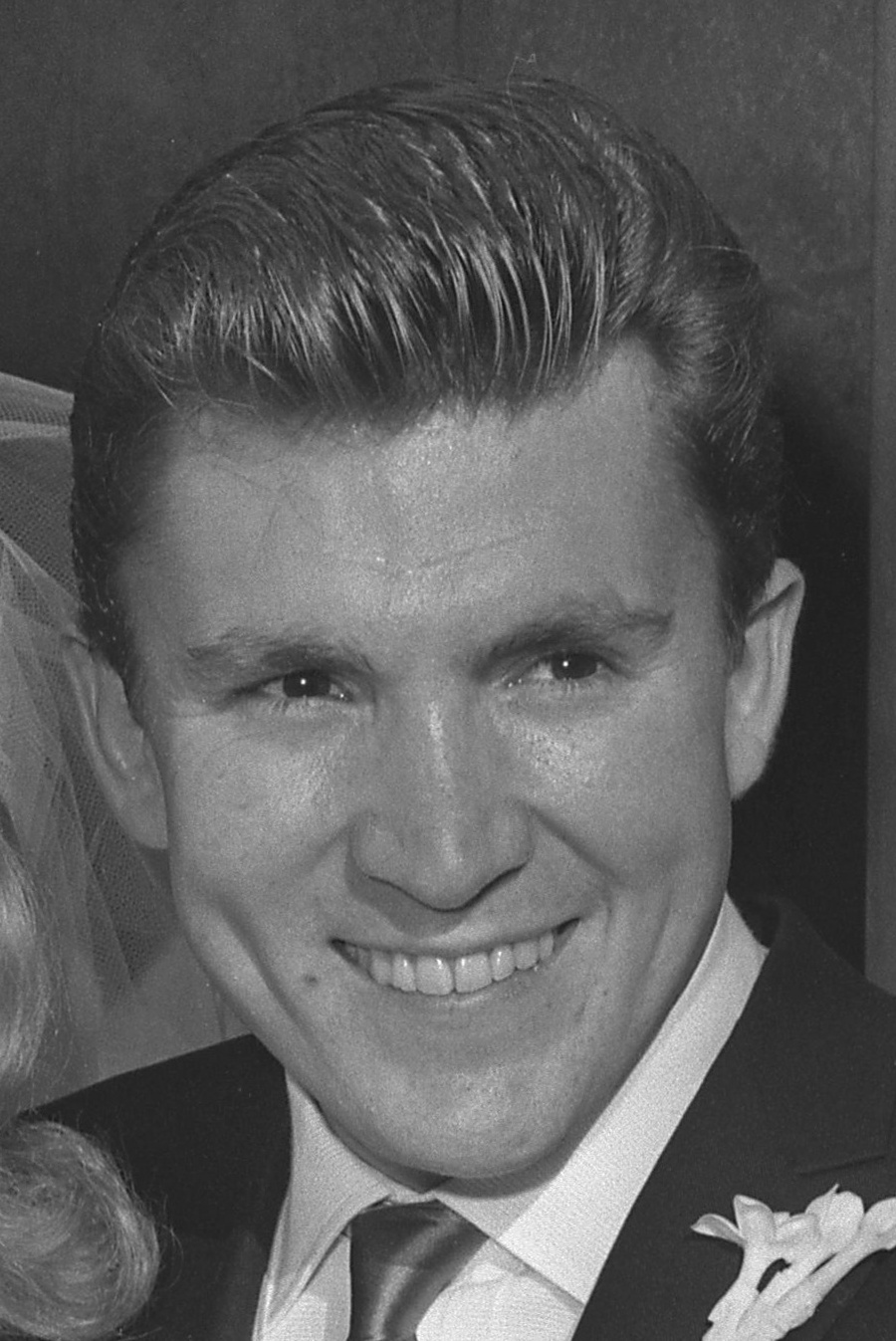
- Reventlow's wedding photo (1964)
- Born: Lance George William Detlev Graf Haugwitz-Hardenberg-Reventlow; 24 February 1936; London, England
- Died: 24 July 1972 (aged 36); Aspen, Colorado, U.S.
- Resting place: Woodlawn Cemetery
- Occupations: Racing driver, entrepreneur
- Years active: 1959–1972
- Spouses: Jill St. John (m. 1960; div. 1963) Cheryl Holdridge (m. 1964)
- Parent(s): Count Kurt von Haugwitz-Hardenberg-Reventlow; Barbara Hutton
- Relatives: Frank Winfield Woolworth (maternal great-grandfather); Charles S. Woolworth (maternal great-granduncle); Edward Francis Hutton (maternal granduncle); Dina Merrill (maternal first cousin once removed)

Lance Graf von Haugwitz-Hardenberg-Reventlow, (24 February 1936 – 24 July 1972) was a British-born American entrepreneur, racing driver and heir to the Woolworth fortune. Reventlow was the only child of heiress Barbara Hutton and her second husband, Count Kurt von Haugwitz-Hardenberg-Reventlow. His stepfathers included actor Cary Grant and Prince Igor Troubetzkoy.

== Early years ==
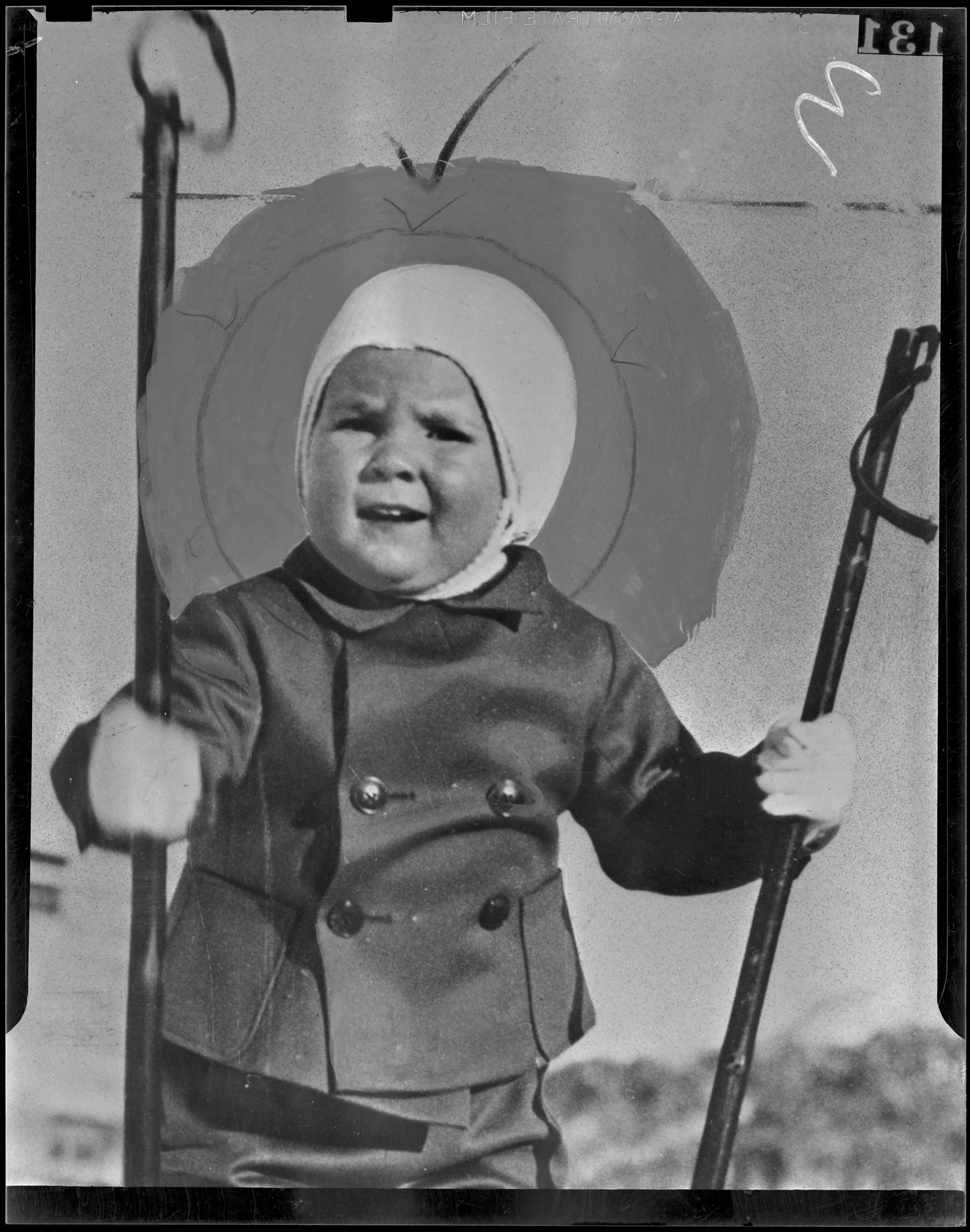
Reventlow as a child circa 1938

Lance Haugwitz-Hardenberg-Reventlow was the only child of Danish nobleman of German descent Count Kurt von Haugwitz-Hardenberg-Reventlow and American socialite Barbara Hutton. Hutton had inherited the Woolworth department store fortune and was then one of the wealthiest women in the world. Reventlow was born at Winfield House in London, restored by his mother and named for her grandfather Frank Winfield Woolworth. Reventlow's birth was difficult and his mother almost died during his delivery. As a child, he struggled with respiratory problems and was asthmatic.

Reventlow's parents' marriage, Hutton's second of seven, was tumultuous and did not last; after the couple divorced in 1938, Reventlow became the subject of a bitter custody battle. In 1944, Reventlow's father was awarded custody until he reached school age, after which his mother would gain custody. Before his father was to relinquish custody, he sent Reventlow to Canada. Hutton regained custody of Reventlow in 1945. Reventlow was largely estranged from his father until the Count's death in 1969.

== Racing career ==
Lance Reventlow
- Born: 24 February 1936
- Died: 24 July 1972 (aged 36)

Formula One World Championship career
- Nationality: American
- Active years: 1960
- Team(s): Scarab, Cooper
- Entries: 4 (1 start)
- Championships: 0
- Wins: 0
- Podiums: 0
- Career points: 0
- Pole positions: 0
- Fastest laps: 0
- First entry: 1960 Monaco Grand Prix
- Last entry: 1960 British Grand Prix

In 1948, at age 12, Reventlow was introduced to the world of Grand Prix motor racing when his mother married Prince Igor Troubetzkoy, who won the Targa Florio that year. In his teenage years, Reventlow's money afforded him the latest in exotic cars, which led to his involvement in motor racing.

In Hollywood, Reventlow became friends with fellow auto enthusiast James Dean and competed in club events around California. On 30 September 1955, he and Bruce Kessler were some of the last people to speak to Dean when they met on their way to an auto race in Salinas, California. Reventlow said he had coffee with Dean at a restaurant approximately thirty minutes before Dean was killed in an automobile accident near Cholame, California, while driving his Porsche 550 Spyder.

=== Professional career ===
Reventlow began his racing career in America in the mid-1950s, initially with a Mercedes before moving to an 1100cc Cooper in 1956. The next year he went to Europe to buy a Maserati, which he crashed heavily at Snetterton, escaping unhurt. He also briefly drove a Cooper Formula 2 car, before returning to the United States. He then set up his own company in Venice, California, to construct Chevrolet-powered race cars he named Scarab with Phil Remington as chief engineer. Along with hired driver Chuck Daigh, the two were initially successful in racing. They won the majority of major sportscar events they entered, often in competition with the Cunningham team of Lister Jaguars. Reventlow had looked at buying a Lister Jaguar, but thought that he could build a better car. Daigh drove a Scarab to victory in the 1958 Riverside International Grand Prix in California, beating a field of international race car teams, including driver Phil Hill and the Ferrari Team. Carroll Shelby drove a Scarab to first place at Continental Divide Raceways in Castle Rock in Douglas County, Colorado, where he broke a course record.

Reventlow's racing team was much talked about for having built the first Formula One race car in America. Shifting operations overseas to Britain, Reventlow's team had little success racing the Scarab cars in Formula One against the new rear-engine race cars. He went back to the drawing board and built a competitive prototype Scarab rear-engined car, but had become less interested in racing before its testing was complete. In 1962, he shut down the operation, leased the California facilities to Shelby, and quit auto racing altogether.

Reventlow's organization constructed a total of eight Scarabs during its existence. In a 1971 interview, Reventlow confirmed that three front-engined Chevy-powered sports cars, three front-engined formula cars, one rear-engined formula car and one rear-engined sports car were built. Two of the front-engined formula cars were powered by Reventlow-commissioned engines drawn up by American racing engine designer Leo Goossen to Reventlow's specifications, while the third car was powered by a Goossen-designed and engineered Offenhauser engine. The rear-engined formula was powered by a modified Buick powerplant; this engine and the suspension/brake package were taken from this car and used on the rear-engined sports car, the last Scarab built.

== Personal life ==
At the age of 21, Reventlow was given the choice between becoming an American, Danish or British citizen. He chose American citizenship, saying, "I thought it over for a full 20 seconds."

On 24 March 1960, Reventlow married actress Jill St. John at the Mark Hopkins Hotel in San Francisco. St. John filed for legal separation on 11 July 1962, but withdrew the suit three weeks later. She filed for divorce on 2 October 1963, citing extreme cruelty; she stated that Reventlow called her "stupid and incompetent" in front of others and bullied her into taking part in dangerous sports. Their divorce was granted on 30 October 1963.

While estranged from St. John, Reventlow dated actress Sherry Jackson.

On 6 November 1964, Reventlow married ex-Mouseketeer Cheryl Holdridge in a lavish ceremony in Hollywood before 600 guests. Reventlow's mother, Barbara Hutton, could not attend the wedding because of illness but gave the couple a $500,000, five-bedroom home set on 21 acres in Benedict Canyon.

=== Death ===
In 1972, Reventlow was seeking real-estate developers as partners to build a ski resort in Aspen, Colorado, where he had a home. He was an experienced pilot, with thousands of hours, rated fully for IFR on multi-engine planes, but on 24 July 1972, Reventlow was a passenger, scouting locations for real estate in a hired single-engine Cessna 206. The pilot was an inexperienced 27-year-old student with only 39 hours' flying time who flew into a blind canyon during a thunderstorm and stalled the aircraft while trying to turn around. The plane plunged to the ground, killing all four aboard.

Reventlow was initially buried, but his remains were later exhumed and cremated. His ashes are interred in the Woolworth mausoleum at the Woodlawn Cemetery in the Bronx.

== Racing career results ==
=== Complete Formula One World Championship results ===
(key)

Year	Entrant	Chassis	Engine	1	2	3	4	5	6	7	8	9	10	WDC	Pts
1960	Reventlow Automobiles Inc.	Scarab F1	Scarab 2.5 L4	ARG	MON; DNQ	500	NED; DNS	BEL; Ret	FRA					NC	0
1960	R.R.C. Walker Racing Team	Cooper T51	Climax FPF 2.5 L4							GBR; PO^{†}	POR	ITA	USA	NC	0

† At the 1960 British Grand Prix, Reventlow drove the Cooper in practice only. The car was driven in the race by Chuck Daigh.
