= 1961 Belgian Grand Prix =

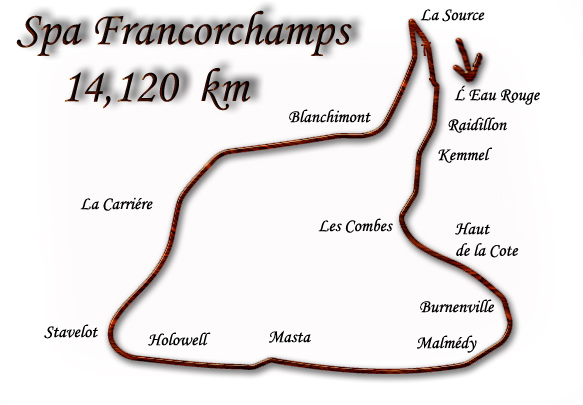

Race details
- Date: 18 June 1961
- Official name: XXI Grand Prix de Belgique
- Location: Circuit de Spa-Francorchamps; Spa, Belgium
- Course: Street circuit/Racing facility
- Course length: 14.1 km (8.761 miles)
- Distance: 30 laps, 423.0 km (262.8 miles)
- Weather: Sunny

Pole position
Driver	(United States) Phil Hill	Ferrari
- Time: 3.59.3

Fastest lap
Driver	(United States) Richie Ginther	Ferrari
- Time: 3.59.8 on lap 20

Podium
First	(United States) Phil Hill	Ferrari
Second	(Germany) Wolfgang von Trips	Ferrari
Third	(United States) Richie Ginther	Ferrari

The 1961 Belgian Grand Prix was a Formula One motor race held on 18 June 1961 at Spa-Francorchamps. It was race 3 of 8 in both the 1961 World Championship of Drivers and the 1961 International Cup for Formula One Manufacturers.

The organizers of the race invited 25 entries, but were only going to pay starting money to 19: sixteen pre-selected cars plus the 3 fastest of the remaining 9. Three of the cars without starting money decided not to race after practising. A fourth entry was a single car for Cliff Allison and Henry Taylor. UDT Laystall decided to let the fastest driver in practice compete, but Allison wrecked the car on his first practice lap. The Emeryson cars were also discarded by Equipe Nationale Belge after discovering terminal chassis damage on one of them, although Willy Mairesse gained the use of a Team Lotus spare machine to post a better time on Saturday. The team eventually reached a deal for Mairesse and Lucien Bianchi to compete in the race with the older, yet proven, Lotus 18s of non-starters Marsh and Seidel.

The race was completely dominated by Ferrari cars, with the four Ferrari cars finishing 1-2-3-4. This was the last time any constructor achieved this score in a F1 race. Of the four Ferrari cars, three cars were entered by the Scuderia Ferrari works team itself and therefore painted red in the tradition of rosso corsa, the national racing colour of Italy, and privately entered Olivier Gendebien's car was painted in a Belgian racing yellow. Apart from two NART entries in the 1964 season this was the last time a Ferrari car wore other than the traditional red colour in Formula One. While Graham Hill took the lead at the start from sixth on the grid, he could not hold off the Italian cars and all had passed him by the end of the first lap. Hill fought with John Surtees for fifth place until he retired with an oil leak on the 24th lap.

== Classification ==
=== Qualifying ===
Pos	No	Driver	Constructor	Qualifying times		Gap
Pos	No	Driver	Constructor	Q1	Q2	Gap
1	4	(United States) Phil Hill	Ferrari	4:06.3	3:59.3	—
2	2	(Germany) Wolfgang von Trips	Ferrari	4:04.0	4:00.1	+0.8
3	8	(Belgium) Olivier Gendebien	Ferrari	4:05.8	4:03.0	+3.7
4	24	(United Kingdom) John Surtees	Cooper-Climax	4:09.1	4:06.0	+6.7
5	6	(United States) Richie Ginther	Ferrari	4:10.5	4:06.1	+6.8
6	36	(United Kingdom) Graham Hill	BRM-Climax	4:07.6	unknown	+8.3
7	38	(United Kingdom) Tony Brooks	BRM-Climax	4:09.8	4:07.9	+8.6
8	14	(United Kingdom) Stirling Moss	Lotus-Climax	4:14.3	4:08.2	+8.9
9	18	(Sweden) Jo Bonnier	Porsche	4:12.3	4:08.3	+9.0
10	20	(United States) Dan Gurney	Porsche	4:08.4	4:10.9	+9.1
11	28	(Australia) Jack Brabham	Cooper-Climax	4:12.2	4:08.6	+9.3
12	44	(United States) Masten Gregory	Cooper-Climax	4:13.5	4:10.2	+10.9
13	40	(United Kingdom) Jackie Lewis	Cooper-Climax	4:18.0	4:11.1	+11.8
14	22	(Netherlands) Carel Godin de Beaufort	Porsche	4:18.7	4:16.7	+17.4
15	30	(New Zealand) Bruce McLaren	Cooper-Climax	4:22.9	4:17.4	+18.1
16	34	(United Kingdom) Jim Clark	Lotus-Climax	No time	4:17.7	+18.4
17	46	(Italy) Lorenzo Bandini	Cooper-Maserati	4:20.8	4:19.0	+19.7
18	32	(United Kingdom) Innes Ireland	Lotus-Climax	No time	4:20.0	+20.7
19	10	(Belgium) Willy Mairesse	Lotus-Climax	4:27.3	4:20.6	+21.3
20	26	(France) Maurice Trintignant	Cooper-Maserati	8:54.2	4:21.4	+22.1
21	42	(United Kingdom) Tony Marsh	Lotus-Climax	4:26.8	4:23.2	+23.9
22	12	(Belgium) Lucien Bianchi	Emeryson-Maserati	4:27.3	4:49.3	+28.0
23	48	(Germany) Wolfgang Seidel	Lotus-Climax	4:33.0	4:27.4	+28.1
24	50	(United Kingdom) Ian Burgess	Lotus-Climax	4:57.2	4:34.6	+35.3
DNS	16	(United Kingdom) Cliff Allison	Lotus-Climax	No time	No time	

Drivers that were not guaranteed full starting money: only the top 3 non-guaranteed drivers would receive it. Despite this, Godin de Beaufort and Bandini chose to compete anyway.

=== Race ===
Pos	No	Driver	Constructor	Laps	Time/Retired	Grid	Points
1	4	(United States) Phil Hill	Ferrari	30	2:03:03.8	1	9
2	2	(Germany) Wolfgang von Trips	Ferrari	30	+0.7 secs	2	6
3	6	(United States) Richie Ginther	Ferrari	30	+19.5 secs	5	4
4	8	(Belgium) Olivier Gendebien	Ferrari	30	+45.6 secs	3	3
5	24	(United Kingdom) John Surtees	Cooper-Climax	30	+1:26.8	4	2
6	20	(United States) Dan Gurney	Porsche	30	+1:31.0	10	1
7	18	(Sweden) Jo Bonnier	Porsche	30	+2:47.1	9	
8	14	(United Kingdom) Stirling Moss	Lotus-Climax	30	+3:55.6	8	
9	40	(United Kingdom) Jackie Lewis	Cooper-Climax	29	+1 Lap	13	
10	44	(United States) Masten Gregory	Cooper-Climax	29	+1 Lap	12	
11	22	(Netherlands) Carel Godin de Beaufort	Porsche	28	+2 Laps	14	
12	34	(United Kingdom) Jim Clark	Lotus-Climax	24	+6 Laps	16	
13	38	(United Kingdom) Tony Brooks	BRM-Climax	24	+6 Laps	7	
Ret	36	(United Kingdom) Graham Hill	BRM-Climax	24	Ignition	6	
Ret	26	(France) Maurice Trintignant	Cooper-Maserati	23	Gearbox	20	
Ret	46	(Italy) Lorenzo Bandini	Cooper-Maserati	20	Wheel Bearing	17	
Ret	28	(Australia) Jack Brabham	Cooper-Climax	12	Engine	11	
Ret	30	(New Zealand) Bruce McLaren	Cooper-Climax	9	Ignition	15	
Ret	32	(United Kingdom) Innes Ireland	Lotus-Climax	9	Engine	18	
Ret	12	(Belgium) Lucien Bianchi	Lotus-Climax	9	Oil Leak	21	
Ret	10	(Belgium) Willy Mairesse	Lotus-Climax	7	Ignition	19	
DNS	42	(United Kingdom) Tony Marsh	Lotus-Climax		Start Money Dispute		
DNS	48	(Germany) Wolfgang Seidel	Lotus-Climax		Start Money Dispute		
DNS	50	(United Kingdom) Ian Burgess	Lotus-Climax		Start Money Dispute		
DNS	16	(United Kingdom) Cliff Allison	Lotus-Climax		Car Damaged in Practice		
WD	16	(United Kingdom) Henry Taylor	Lotus-Climax		Car Damaged by Allison		

== Championship standings after the race ==
Drivers' Championship standings

	Pos	Driver	Points
2	1	(United States) Phil Hill	19
	2	(Germany) Wolfgang von Trips	18
2	3	(United Kingdom) Stirling Moss	12
	4	(United States) Richie Ginther	12
	5	(United Kingdom) Jim Clark	4

Constructors' Championship standings

	Pos	Constructor	Points
	1	(Italy) Ferrari	22
	2	(United Kingdom) Lotus-Climax	12
1	3	(United Kingdom) Cooper-Climax	4
1	4	(Germany) Porsche	3

- Notes: Only the top five positions are included for both sets of standings.

Previous race: 1961 Dutch Grand Prix	FIA Formula One World Championship; 1961 season	Next race: 1961 French Grand Prix
Previous race: 1960 Belgian Grand Prix	Belgian Grand Prix	Next race: 1962 Belgian Grand Prix
