= Chuck Daigh =

American racing driver (1923–2008)

- Born: November 29, 1923; Long Beach, California, U.S.
- Died: April 29, 2008 (aged 84); Newport Beach, California, U.S.

Formula One World Championship career
- Nationality: (United States) American
- Active years: 1960
- Team(s): Scarab, Cooper
- Entries: 8 (3 starts)
- Championships: 0
- Wins: 0
- Podiums: 0
- Career points: 0
- Pole positions: 0
- Fastest laps: 0
- First entry: 1960 Monaco Grand Prix
- Last entry: 1960 United States Grand Prix

Charles George Daigh (November 29, 1923 – April 29, 2008) was an American racing car driver. He broke into Grand Prix racing through Lance Reventlow's Scarab team, by virtue of being one of the resident engineers. Born in Long Beach, California, he participated in six World Championship Formula One races, debuting on May 29, 1960, and scoring no championship points. He also participated in one non-Championship Formula One race.

Following the 1960 season, Daigh went on to contest races in the International Formula league in Europe, driving the previous year's front-engined Scarab car. He finished eighth at Goodwood while contesting the Lavant Cup and finished seventh in an attempt at the International Trophy. He later crashed out of the British Empire Trophy at Silverstone.

Daigh was also a successful sportscar driver in America, winning the 1959 Sebring endurance classic and also trying to qualify twice for the Indianapolis 500, but without success. He also won the 1958 United States Sports Car Grand Prix at Riverside, California, driving a Scarab. This event is largely credited with launching professional sports car racing in the United States.

Daigh died in a hospital in Newport Beach, California, after a brief battle with heart and respiratory problems.

== Racing record ==
=== Formula One World Championship results ===
(key)

Year	Entrant	Chassis	Engine	1	2	3	4	5	6	7	8	9	10	WDC	Pts.
1959	J.C. Agajanian	Kuzma Indy Roadster	Offenhauser L4	MON	500; DNQ	NED	FRA	GBR	GER	POR	ITA	USA		NC	0
1960	Reventlow Automobiles Inc.	Scarab F1	Scarab Straight-4	ARG; DNA	MON; DNQ	500	NED; DNS	BEL; Ret	FRA; DNS				USA; 10	NC	0
1960	Cooper Car Company	Cooper T51	Climax L4							GBR; Ret	POR	ITA		NC	0

=== Complete British Saloon Car Championship results ===
(key) (Races in bold indicate pole position; races in italics indicate fastest lap.)

Year	Team	Car	Class	1	2	3	4	5	6	7	8	9	Pos.	Pts	Class
1961	Reventlow Automobiles	Ford Galaxie	D	SNE	GOO	AIN	SIL	CRY	SIL; DNS	BRH	OUL	SNE	NC	0	NC

=== 24 Hours of Le Mans results ===
Year	Team	Co-Driver	Car	Class	Laps	Pos.	Class Pos.
1960	(United States) Camoradi USA	(United States) Masten Gregory	Maserati Tipo 60/61	S3.0	82	DNF	DNF
