= 1961 Monaco Grand Prix =

Coordinates: 43°44′4.74″N 7°25′16.8″E

Race 1 of 8 in the 1961 Formula One season
Next race →

Race details
- Date: 14 May 1961
- Official name: XIX Grand Prix de Monaco
- Location: Circuit de Monaco; Monte Carlo/La Condamine, Monaco
- Course: Street circuit
- Course length: 3.145 km (1.954 miles)
- Distance: 100 laps, 314.5 km (195.4 miles)
- Weather: Sunny

Pole position
Driver	(United Kingdom) Stirling Moss	Lotus-Climax
- Time: 1.39.1

Fastest lap
Drivers	(United States) Richie Ginther (lap 84)	Ferrari
	(United Kingdom) Stirling Moss (lap 85)	Lotus-Climax
- Time: 1.36.3

Podium
First	(United Kingdom) Stirling Moss	Lotus-Climax
Second	(United States) Richie Ginther	Ferrari
Third	(United States) Phil Hill	Ferrari

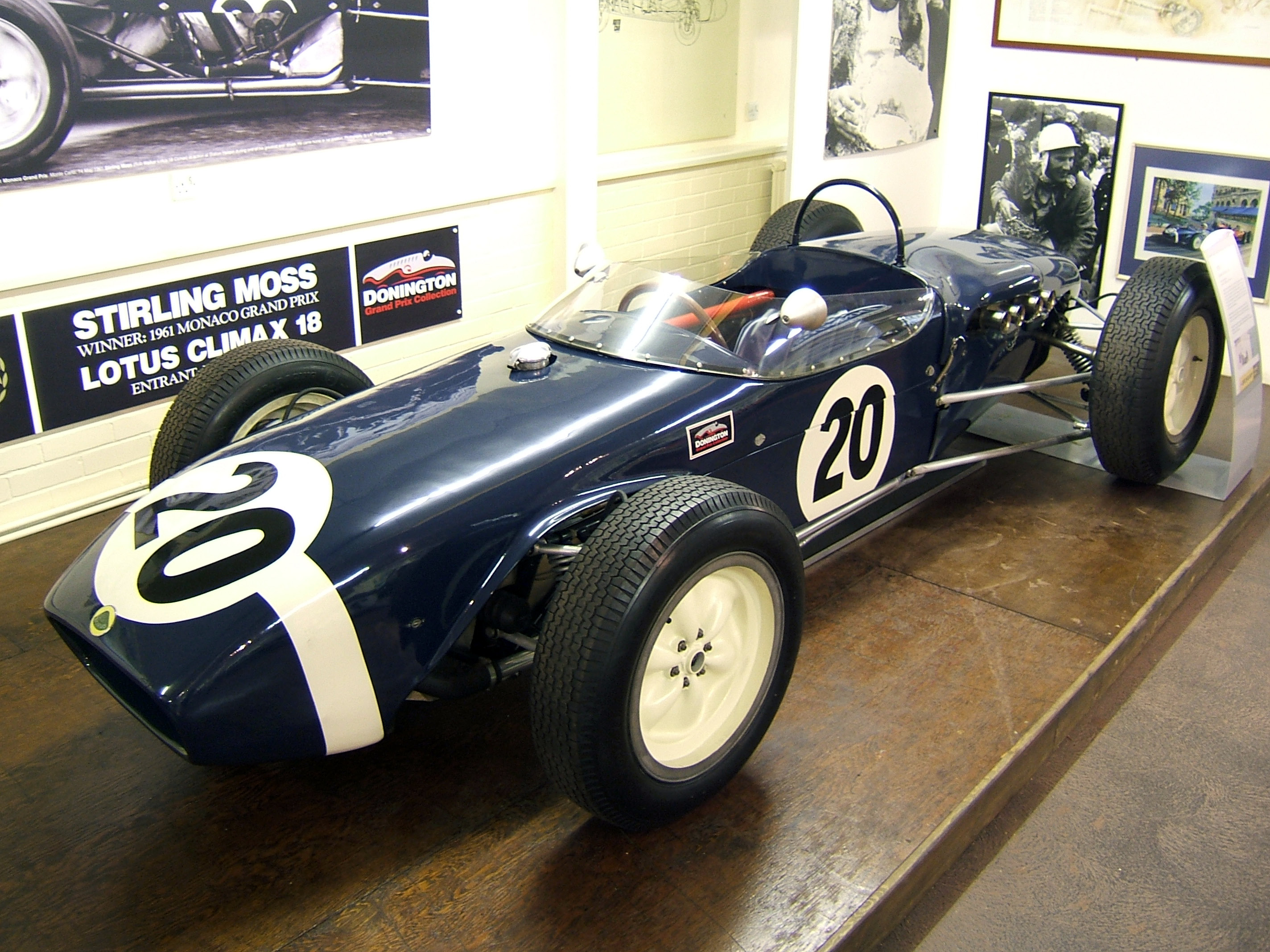
The Rob Walker Racing Lotus 18 which Stirling Moss drove to victory in the 1961 Monaco Grand Prix.

The 1961 Monaco Grand Prix was a Formula One motor race held on 14 May 1961 on the Circuit de Monaco in Monte Carlo, Monaco. It was race 1 of 8 in both the 1961 World Championship of Drivers and the 1961 International Cup for Formula One Manufacturers. It was also the first World Championship race under the new 1.5 litre engine regulations.

== Report ==
=== Qualifying ===
The erratic yearly variations in Monaco's qualifying regulations saw grid places guaranteed for works teams and past winners in 1961. Therefore, the five works teams were awarded two places each on the grid, while Stirling Moss and Maurice Trintignant earned spots. This left nine drivers to fight over four remaining slots. A fifth opened up when Innes Ireland crashed during the final practice session, breaking his leg. Moss took pole position from Richie Ginther and Jim Clark, with Graham Hill and Phil Hill on the second row.

=== Race ===
Ginther led Clark and Moss into the first corner but Clark quickly ran into trouble with a faulty fuel pump. Ginther dropped to third on lap 14, when Moss and Bonnier passed him in quick succession. At quarter distance, Moss had an impressive 10 second lead (in the underpowered Lotus 18-Climax) but the Ferraris of Hill and then Ginther found their way around Bonnier and began to close the gap. At half distance, Moss' lead was 8 seconds, and down to 3 seconds on lap 60. Ginther moved into second on lap 75 and tried to close the gap, but Moss proved able to match his lap times, despite the 156's horsepower advantage.

== Classification ==
=== Qualifying ===
Pos	No	Driver	Constructor	Qualifying times			Gap
Pos	No	Driver	Constructor	Q1	Q2	Q3	Gap
1	20	(United Kingdom) Stirling Moss	Lotus-Climax	1:41.1	1:41.4	1:39.1	—
2	36	(United States) Richie Ginther	Ferrari	1:41.0	1:39.3	1:41.7	+0.2
3	28	(United Kingdom) Jim Clark	Lotus-Climax	1:39.6	No time	No time	+0.5
4	18	(United Kingdom) Graham Hill	BRM-Climax	1:42.8	1:40.0	1:39.6	+0.5
5	38	(United States) Phil Hill	Ferrari	1:41.0	1:39.8	1:40.2	+0.7
6	40	(Germany) Wolfgang von Trips	Ferrari	1:41.7	1:40.3	1:39.8	+0.7
7	26	(New Zealand) Bruce McLaren	Cooper-Climax	1:44.7	1:41.3	1:39.8	+0.7
8	16	(United Kingdom) Tony Brooks	BRM-Climax	1:44.6	1:42.1	1:40.1	+1.0
9	2	(Sweden) Jo Bonnier	Porsche	No time	1:41.9	1:40.3	+1.2
10	30	(United Kingdom) Innes Ireland	Lotus-Climax	1:41.5	1:40.5	1:40.7	+1.4
11	4	(United States) Dan Gurney	Porsche	No time	1:42.7	1:40.6	+1.5
12	22	(United Kingdom) John Surtees	Cooper-Climax	1:44.3	1:41.1	2:09.1	+2.0
13	6	(Germany) Hans Herrmann	Porsche	No time	1:42.4	1:41.1	+2.0
14	8	(Switzerland) Michael May	Lotus-Climax	1:45.4	1:42.0	1:43.8	+2.9
15	32	(United Kingdom) Cliff Allison	Lotus-Climax	1:56.7	1:42.3	1:43.2	+3.2
16	42	(France) Maurice Trintignant	Cooper-Maserati	1:47.6	1:43.2	1:42.4	+3.3
17	34	(United Kingdom) Henry Taylor	Lotus-Climax	1:45.5	1:43.7	1:42.6	+3.5
18	14	(United States) Masten Gregory	Cooper-Climax	1:45.7	1:42.7	1:42.7	+3.6
19	10	(Belgium) Lucien Bianchi	Emeryson-Maserati	1:44.0	1:42.9	1:44.5	+3.8
20	12	(Belgium) Olivier Gendebien	Emeryson-Maserati	1:45.4	1:43.7	1:45.0	+4.6
21	24	(Australia) Jack Brabham	Cooper-Climax	1:44.0	No time	No time	+4.9

Drivers that had to qualify on speed: only the five fastest (four before Ireland's injury) would race.

=== Race ===
Pos	No	Driver	Constructor	Laps	Time/Retired	Grid	Points
1	20	(United Kingdom) Stirling Moss	Lotus-Climax	100	2:45:50.1	1	9
2	36	(United States) Richie Ginther	Ferrari	100	+3.6 secs	2	6
3	38	(United States) Phil Hill	Ferrari	100	+41.3 secs	5	4
4	40	(Germany) Wolfgang von Trips	Ferrari	98	Accident	6	3
5	4	(United States) Dan Gurney	Porsche	98	+2 Laps	10	2
6	26	(New Zealand) Bruce McLaren	Cooper-Climax	95	+5 Laps	7	1
7	42	(France) Maurice Trintignant	Cooper-Maserati	95	+5 Laps	15	
8	32	(United Kingdom) Cliff Allison	Lotus-Climax	93	+7 Laps	14	
9	6	(Germany) Hans Herrmann	Porsche	91	+9 Laps	12	
10	28	(United Kingdom) Jim Clark	Lotus-Climax	89	+11 Laps	3	
11	22	(United Kingdom) John Surtees	Cooper-Climax	68	Engine	11	
12	2	(Sweden) Jo Bonnier	Porsche	59	Injection	9	
13	16	(United Kingdom) Tony Brooks	BRM-Climax	54	Engine	8	
Ret	8	(Switzerland) Michael May	Lotus-Climax	42	Oil Pipe	13	
Ret	24	(Australia) Jack Brabham	Cooper-Climax	38	Ignition	16	
Ret	18	(United Kingdom) Graham Hill	BRM-Climax	11	Fuel Pump	4	
DNS	30	(United Kingdom) Innes Ireland	Lotus-Climax		Injury in Practice		
DNQ	34	(United Kingdom) Henry Taylor	Lotus-Climax				
DNQ	14	(United States) Masten Gregory	Cooper-Climax				
DNQ	10	(Belgium) Lucien Bianchi	Emeryson-Maserati				
DNQ	12	(Belgium) Olivier Gendebien	Emeryson-Maserati				

== Notes ==
- This was the third time Stirling Moss had won the Monaco Grand Prix, thereby breaking the old record of two Grand Prix wins set by Juan Manuel Fangio at the 1957 Monaco Grand Prix.
- This was the 50th race for Cooper.

== Championship standings after the race ==
Drivers' Championship standings

Pos	Driver	Points
1	(United Kingdom) Stirling Moss	9
2	(United States) Richie Ginther	6
3	(United States) Phil Hill	4
4	(Germany) Wolfgang von Trips	3
5	(United States) Dan Gurney	2

Constructors' Championship standings

Pos	Constructor	Points
1	(United Kingdom) Lotus-Climax	8
2	(Italy) Ferrari	6
3	(Germany) Porsche	2
4	(United Kingdom) Cooper-Climax	1

- Notes: Only the top five positions are included for both sets of standings.

Previous race: 1960 United States Grand Prix	FIA Formula One World Championship; 1961 season	Next race: 1961 Dutch Grand Prix
Previous race: 1960 Monaco Grand Prix	Monaco Grand Prix	Next race: 1962 Monaco Grand Prix
