= 1961 Dutch Grand Prix =

- Zandvoort original layout

Race details
- Date: May 22, 1961
- Official name: IX Grote Prijs van Nederland
- Location: Circuit Park Zandvoort; Zandvoort, Netherlands
- Course: Permanent racing facility
- Course length: 4.193 km (2.605 miles)
- Distance: 75 laps, 314.47 km (195.37 miles)
- Weather: Sunny

Pole position
Driver	(United States) Phil Hill	Ferrari
- Time: 1.35.7

Fastest lap
Driver	(United Kingdom) Jim Clark	Lotus-Climax
- Time: 1.35.5 on lap 7

Podium
First	(Germany) Wolfgang von Trips	Ferrari
Second	(United States) Phil Hill	Ferrari
Third	(United Kingdom) Jim Clark	Lotus-Climax

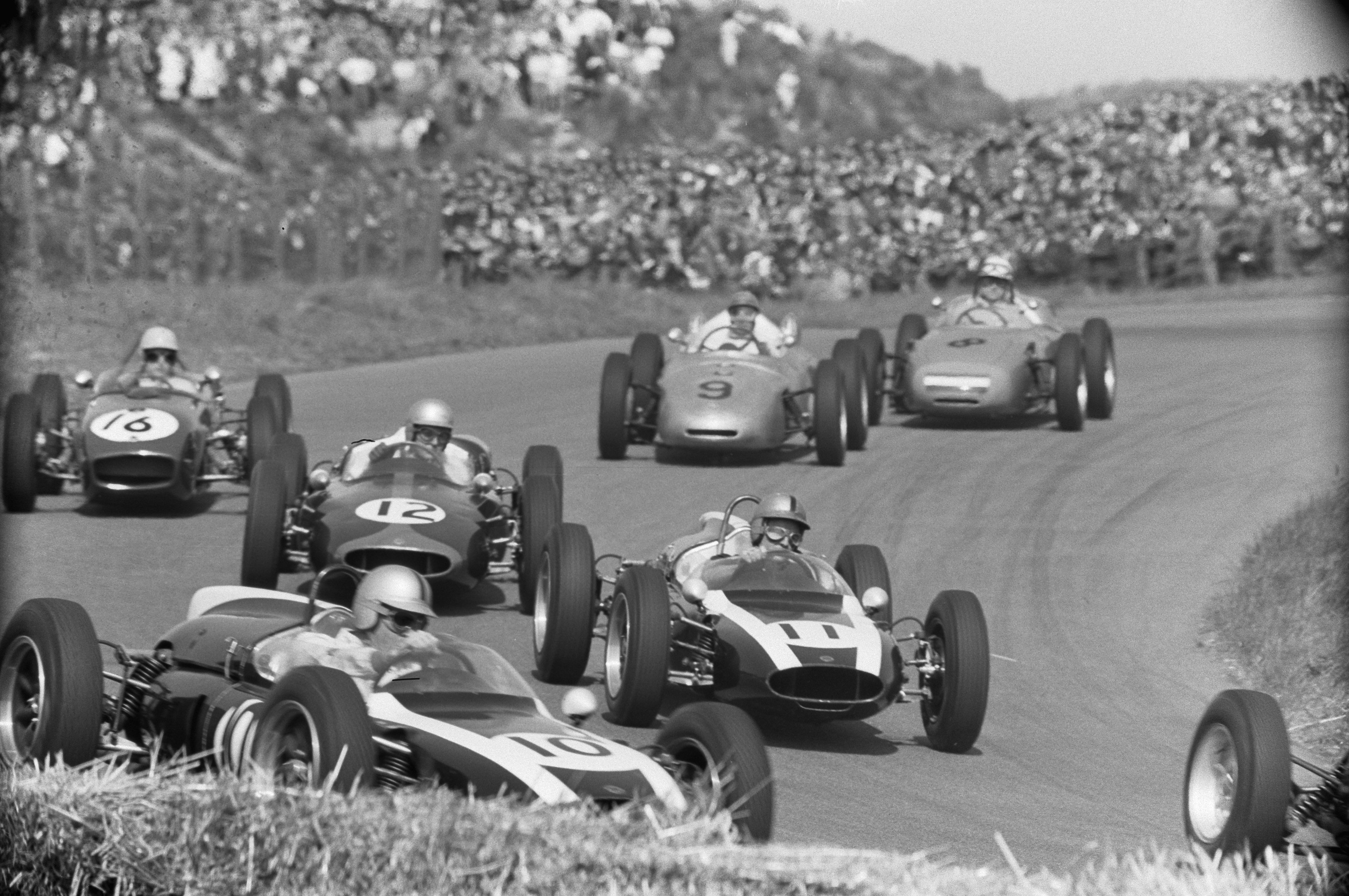
Brabham, Moss, Surtees, Taylor and Herrmann right after the race start

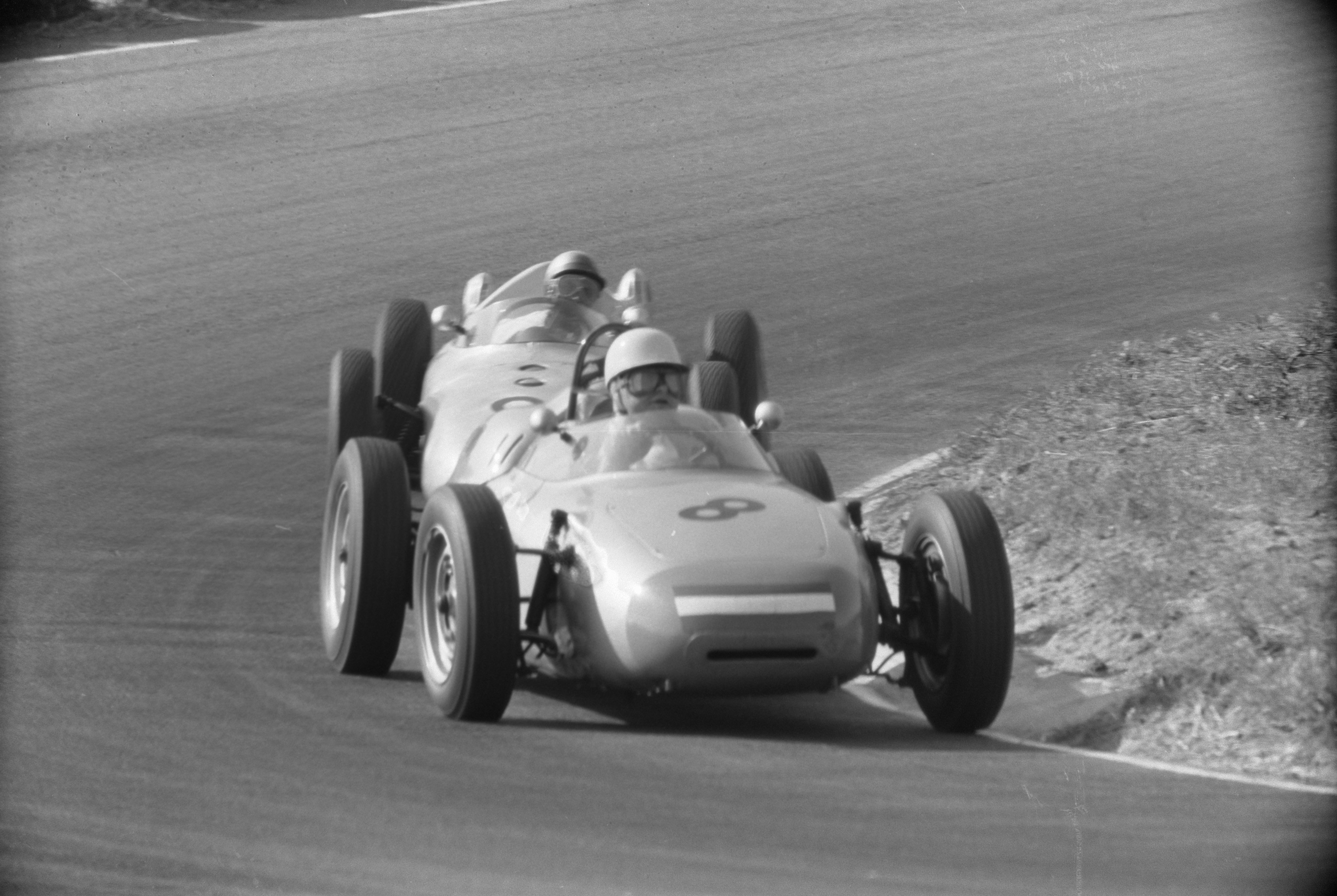
Carel Godin de Beaufort driving the Porsche 718 in the 1961 Dutch Grand Prix

The 1961 Dutch Grand Prix was a Formula One motor race held on 22 May 1961 at Zandvoort. It was race 2 of 8 in both the 1961 World Championship of Drivers and the 1961 International Cup for Formula One Manufacturers.

Taking place one week after the Monaco Grand Prix, there was no time for Innes Ireland to heal from his injury in the previous race, so he was replaced by Trevor Taylor. The front row was taken up by three Ferraris. Wolfgang von Trips took the lead from the start and led every lap. Phil Hill was second but was soon pressured by Jim Clark, who had started from the fourth row. The two would trade second place often with the Ferrari quicker on the straight and the Lotus faster in the corners. This continued until about 20 laps from the end when Clark's handling allowed the Ferrari to pull away. Fourth place was contested between Stirling Moss and Richie Ginther, with Moss passing Ginther on the final lap. The race was the first of 24 races in Formula 1 history in which every car that started the race was classified as a finisher. In addition, no drivers made any pit stops; only one of only two World Championship races in history to have this latter distinction - the other being the 2021 Belgian Grand Prix - which was red-flagged after two full laps due to bad weather.

== Classification ==
=== Qualifying ===
Pos	No	Driver	Constructor	Qualifying times			Gap
Pos	No	Driver	Constructor	Q1	Q2	Q3	Gap
1	1	(United States) Phil Hill	Ferrari	No time	1:37.0	1:35.7	—
2	3	(Germany) Wolfgang von Trips	Ferrari	No time	1:36.6	1:35.7	—
3	2	(United States) Richie Ginther	Ferrari	No time	1:36.7	1:35.9	+0.2
4	14	(United Kingdom) Stirling Moss	Lotus-Climax	1:38.1	1:36.2	1:37.6	+0.4
5	4	(United Kingdom) Graham Hill	BRM-Climax	1:38.6	1:36.7	1:36.3	+0.6
6	7	(United States) Dan Gurney	Porsche	1:38.9	1:36.5	1:36.4	+0.7
7	10	(Australia) Jack Brabham	Cooper-Climax	1:36.6	1:36.7	1:37.1	+0.9
8	5	(United Kingdom) Tony Brooks	BRM-Climax	1:39.0	1:36.9	1:36.8	+1.1
9	12	(United Kingdom) John Surtees	Cooper-Climax	1:40.7	1:36.8	1:37.6	+1.1
10	17	(United States) Masten Gregory	Cooper-Climax	1:38.8	1:38.5	1:36.8	+1.1
11	15	(United Kingdom) Jim Clark	Lotus-Climax	1:39.3	1:37.0	1:36.9	+1.2
12	6	(Sweden) Jo Bonnier	Porsche	1:39.6	1:37.1	1:38.5	+1.4
13	9	(Germany) Hans Herrmann	Porsche	1:39.0	1:38.0	1:39.5	+2.3
14	18	(United Kingdom) Ian Burgess	Lotus-Climax	No time	1:46.8	1:38.0	+2.3
15	11	(New Zealand) Bruce McLaren	Cooper-Climax	1:41.3	1:38.5	1:38.2	+2.5
16	16	(United Kingdom) Trevor Taylor	Lotus-Climax	1:42.0	1:40.8	1:39.5	+3.8
17	8	(Netherlands) Carel Godin de Beaufort	Porsche	1:42.3	1:40.9	1:39.8	+4.1

=== Race ===
Pos	No	Driver	Constructor	Laps	Time/Retired	Grid	Points
1	3	(Germany) Wolfgang von Trips	Ferrari	75	2:01:52.1	2	9
2	1	(United States) Phil Hill	Ferrari	75	+0.9	1	6
3	15	(United Kingdom) Jim Clark	Lotus-Climax	75	+13.1	10	4
4	14	(United Kingdom) Stirling Moss	Lotus-Climax	75	+22.2	4	3
5	2	(United States) Richie Ginther	Ferrari	75	+22.3	3	2
6	10	(Australia) Jack Brabham	Cooper-Climax	75	+1:20.1	7	1
7	12	(United Kingdom) John Surtees	Cooper-Climax	75	+1:26.7	9	
8	4	(United Kingdom) Graham Hill	BRM-Climax	75	+1:29.8	5	
9	5	(United Kingdom) Tony Brooks	BRM-Climax	74	+1 Lap	8	
10	7	(United States) Dan Gurney	Porsche	74	+1 Lap	6	
11	6	(Sweden) Jo Bonnier	Porsche	73	+2 Laps	11	
12	11	(New Zealand) Bruce McLaren	Cooper-Climax	73	+2 Laps	13	
13	16	(United Kingdom) Trevor Taylor	Lotus-Climax	73	+2 Laps	14	
14	8	(Netherlands) Carel Godin de Beaufort	Porsche	72	+3 Laps	15	
15	9	(Germany) Hans Herrmann	Porsche	72	+3 Laps	12	
DNS	17	(United States) Masten Gregory	Cooper-Climax		Reserve Entry		
DNS	18	(United Kingdom) Ian Burgess	Lotus-Climax		Reserve Entry		

== Notes ==
- This was the first Formula One World Championship Grand Prix win for a German driver. It was also the first Grand Prix win for Wolfgang von Trips.

== Championship standings after the race ==
Drivers' Championship standings

	Pos	Driver	Points
	1	(United Kingdom) Stirling Moss	12
2	2	(Germany) Wolfgang von Trips	12
	3	(United States) Phil Hill	10
2	4	(United States) Richie Ginther	8
5	5	(United Kingdom) Jim Clark	4

Constructors' Championship standings

	Pos	Constructor	Points
1	1	(Italy) Ferrari	14
1	2	(United Kingdom) Lotus-Climax	12
	3	(Germany) Porsche	2
	4	(United Kingdom) Cooper-Climax	2

- Notes: Only the top five positions are included for both sets of standings.

Previous race: 1961 Monaco Grand Prix	FIA Formula One World Championship; 1961 season	Next race: 1961 Belgian Grand Prix
Previous race: 1960 Dutch Grand Prix	Dutch Grand Prix	Next race: 1962 Dutch Grand Prix
