= Richie Ginther =

American racing driver (1930–1989)

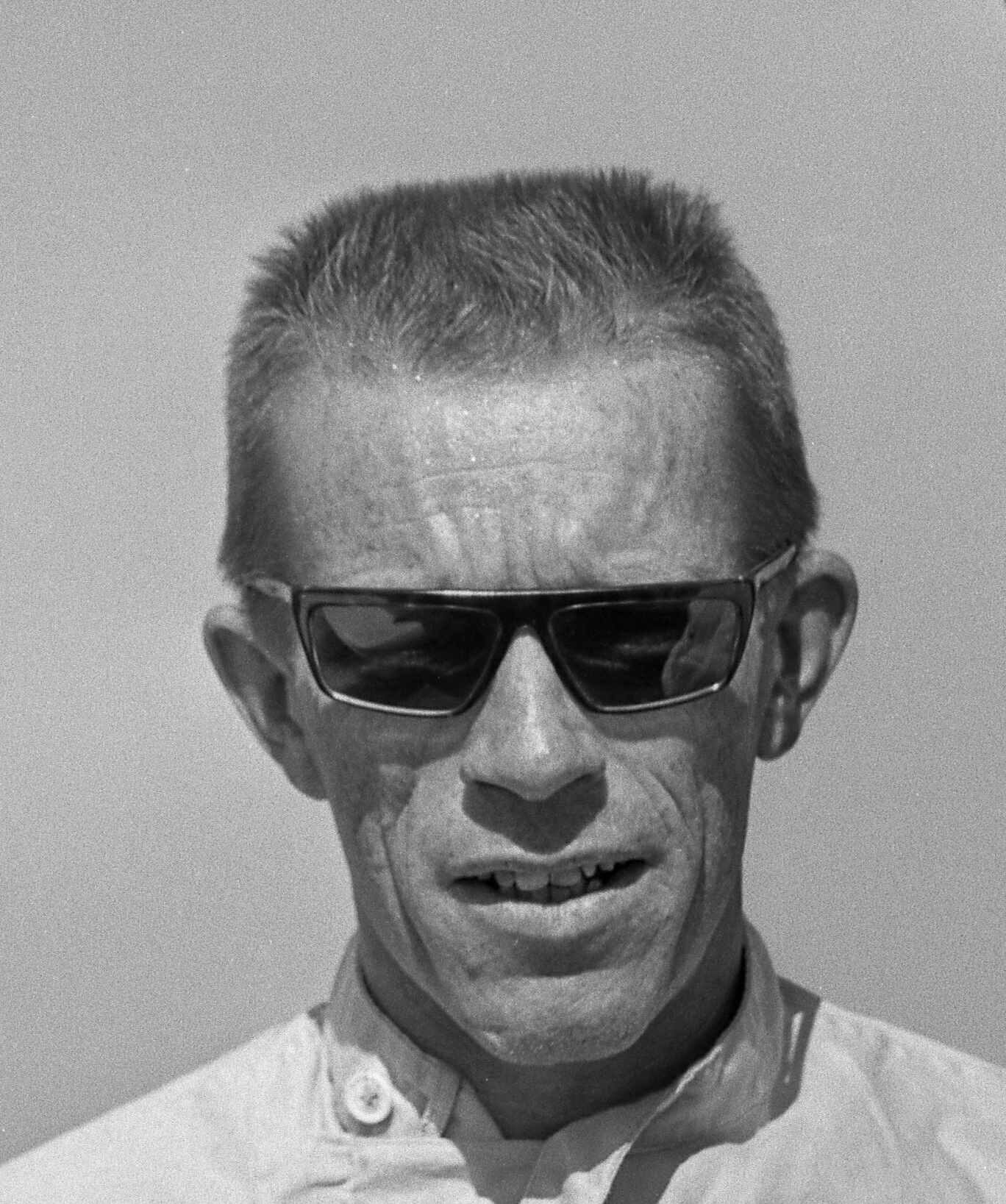
- Ginther in 1964
- Born: Paul Richard Ginther; 5 August 1930; Los Angeles, California, U.S.
- Died: 20 September 1989 (aged 59); Touzac, Charente, France

Formula One World Championship career
- Nationality: (United States) American
- Active years: 1960–1967
- Team(s): Ferrari, Scarab, BRM, Honda, Cooper, Eagle
- Entries: 54 (52 starts)
- Championships: 0
- Wins: 1
- Podiums: 14
- Career points: 102 (107) (Note: Up until 1990, not all points scored by a driver contributed to their final World Championship tally (see list of points scoring systems for more information). Numbers without parentheses are Championship points; numbers in parentheses are total points scored.)
- Pole positions: 0
- Fastest laps: 3
- First entry: 1960 Monaco Grand Prix
- First win: 1965 Mexican Grand Prix
- Last entry: 1967 Monaco Grand Prix

24 Hours of Le Mans career
- Years: 1957, 1960–1964, 1966
- Teams: Ferrari, Aston Martin, BRM, Ford, NART
- Best finish: DNF

Paul Richard "Richie" Ginther (5 August 1930 – 20 September 1989) was an American racing driver, who competed in Formula One from 1960 to 1967. He recorded the first Formula One win for both Honda and Goodyear at the Mexican Grand Prix in 1965.

Born in Hollywood, Ginther competed in Formula One for Ferrari, Scarab, BRM, Honda, Cooper and Eagle. He finished third in the 1963 World Drivers' Championship with BRM, and scored 14 podiums across eight seasons.

Ginther was inducted into the Motorsports Hall of Fame of America in 2008.

== Early career ==
Richie Ginther was born on 5 August 1930 in Hollywood. His family moved to Ohio for his father's work before moving back to California and to Santa Monica, the same Californian town as future Formula One World Champion Phil Hill, and it was through Hill, a friend of Ginther's older brother, George, that he first began to race. After finishing school in 1948, Ginther followed in his father's footsteps and went to work for Douglas Aircraft, initially in the tool and die shop. In his spare time he helped Hill to repair, maintain and race his collection of old cars and hot rods, as Hill's racing career began to gather pace. Ginther made his race debut at Pebble Beach in 1951, driving a Ford-engined MG T-type sports car.

However, Ginther's career was put on hold shortly after, when he was drafted for two years of national service during the Korean War. During this time he received training and experience working in aircraft and engine mechanics, skills which he would later put to good use during his driving career. On emergence from the military, Hill requested that Ginther join him, principally as a riding mechanic, in driving a privately entered 4.1-liter Ferrari in the 1953 Carrera Panamericana. The pair ran high in the rankings until Hill lost control, crashed, and wrote off the car. Both Ginther and Hill were unharmed and returned in 1954 to take second place, beaten only by the works Ferrari of Umberto Maglioli.

It was also in 1954 that Ginther returned to race driving himself, mostly in a self-prepared Austin-Healey. His results were impressive enough that the following year VW and Porsche dealer John von Neumann hired him to drive a Porsche in domestic competitions. When von Neumann started dealing in Ferrari cars in 1956, Ginther also got the chance to drive these. In between working in von Neumann's Ferrari dealership — including trips to the Ferrari factory in Italy to sort customer problems — Ginther began to build an impressive racing reputation on the West Coast. This, and his choice of Ferrari mounts, brought him to the attention of the East Coast Ferrari franchise-holder, three-time 24 Hours of Le Mans-winner, Luigi Chinetti. Aside from importing Ferrari road cars, Chinetti also operated a successful race team, soon to metamorphose into Ferrari's official motorsport presence in North America: NART. Ginther first raced for Chinetti in 1957 and with him made his first appearances in international-level events, first in the 12 Hours of Sebring and then driving a two-liter Ferrari 500 TR in the 1957 Le Mans race.

Also in 1957, Ginther was signed to drive the Aston Martin of Joe Lubin and over the next three years would continue to compete in many sports car racing events in both Aston and Ferrari machinery, with great success. That June, he won a 15-lap GT race at the new Lime Rock Park, and won the opening race of the national championship in his Ferrari. In early-1958, he piloted a two-liter Ferrari to victory at the County Fairgrounds in Pomona, California, averaging 83.8 mph (134.9 km/h), and won in a three-liter GT in a five-lap qualifying preliminary for the SCCA Pacific Coast Championship. By the end of the year, Ginther had captured the Pacific Coast Sports Car Championship outright. He triumphed by a wide margin at Pomona at the opening sports car race of 1959, in a von Neumann 4.1-liter Ferrari, and in June 1959, won in a three-liter Ferrari TR in the first Hourglass road races in San Diego, California. Throughout this period, he continued to mix his race driving with a steady job at von Neumann's dealership, and by late 1959, the strain was beginning to show.

== Formula One ==
=== Ferrari ===
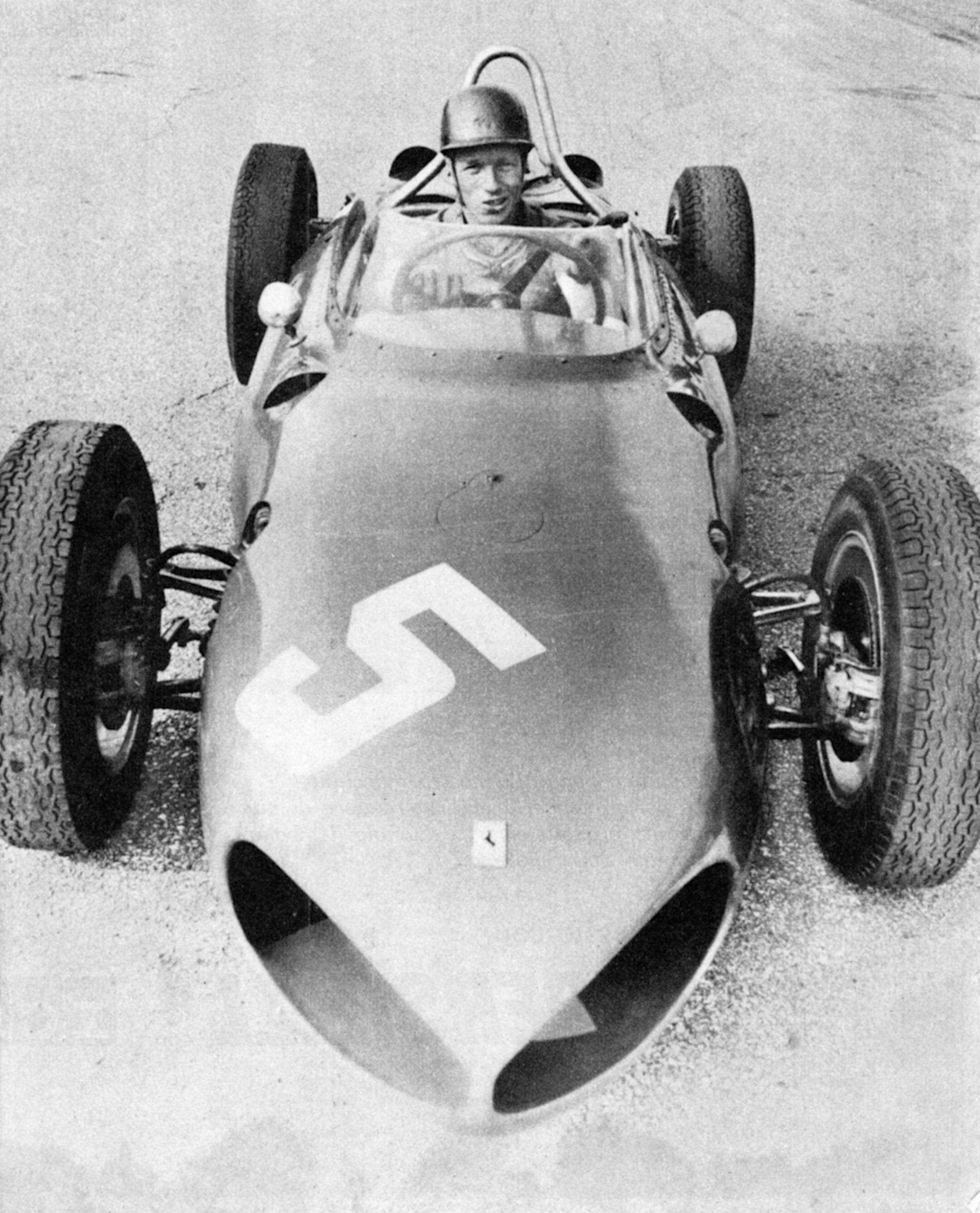
Ginther testing the new Ferrari 156 F1 in Monza prior the 1961 season

Ginther made his F1 debut at the 1960 Monaco Grand Prix driving for Ferrari, which he stayed with through 1961. In the September 1960 Italian Grand Prix in Monza, he placed second to Hill. Ginther led from the start until the 25th lap when Hill passed him and led until the finish.

Following the 1960 season, the Ferrari team gave up 1000 cc in engine size. The 2500 cc engine, permitted the previous year, was replaced by a 1.5-liter rear-engine model, with 110 less horsepower. However, the newer engine was superior in both "profiling" and handling. The conservative Enzo Ferrari was the last major Formula One race car manufacturer to make the transition to cars with engines in the rear. In 1961, Ginther was the No. 3 Ferrari driver, behind No. 1 Wolfgang Von Trips and No. 2 Hill. Giancarlo Baghetti occasionally piloted a fourth car. The team manager was Romulo Tavoni.

On May 14, 1961, Ginther finished second to Stirling Moss at the 1961 Monaco Grand Prix, 3.6 seconds behind, a few hundred feet. He was driving a new rear-engine Ferrari with a 120-degree V-6 which had a lower center of gravity. Ginther had qualified second, just ahead of Hill, with an average speed of 70.7 mph (113.8 km/h), and a qualifying time of 1:39.3. He eclipsed the previous course record of 1:39.6, before Moss took pole position the day after.

In August 1961, Ginther and Baghetti were teammates at the Pescara Grand Prix, a world auto manufacturers' championship event. Their Ferrari was leading on the tenth lap when it stopped on a straight stretch with a flat tire. Ginther averaged more than 133 mph (214 km/h) on the 6.2-mile (10.0 km) Autodromo Nazionale Monza in September 1961, to lead the first day of qualifying for the 1961 Italian Grand Prix. Von Trips qualified first with Ginther taking the third starting position after Ricardo Rodriguez. Ginther retired in the race. Von Trips died in a spectacular crash on the second lap, which also killed eleven spectators, when his Ferrari climbed a 5-foot-high (1.5 m) earth embankment. It brushed a wire fence employed to restrain a portion of the crowd and struck the spectators. Some who were injured eventually succumbed and brought the total to 15 deaths. The Ferrari team ceased competition until January 1, 1962, as a mark of respect to Von Trips.

=== BRM and Honda ===
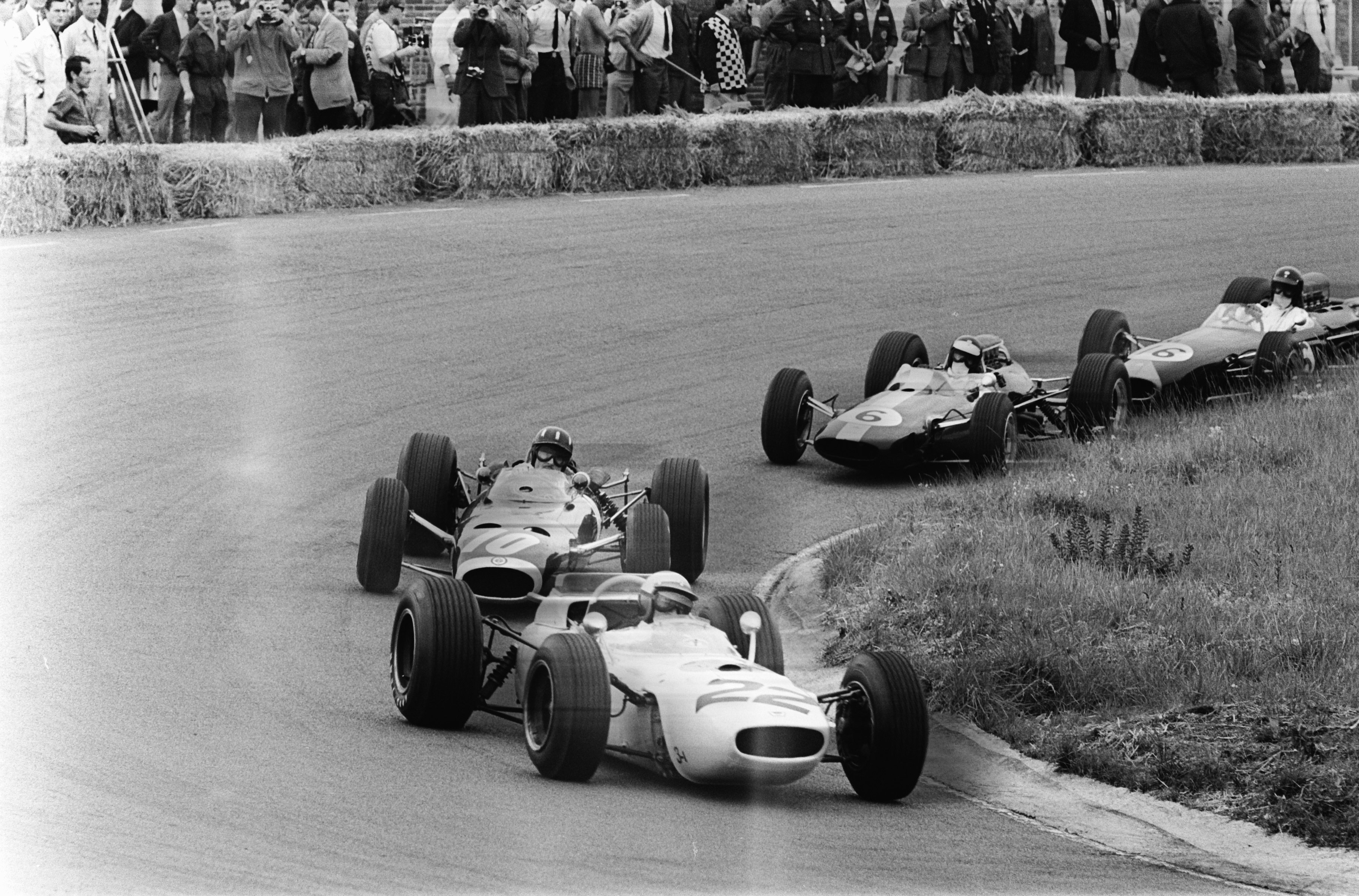
Ginther leading the pack in his Honda RA272 during the 1965 Dutch Grand Prix

In 1962, Ginther switched to the British-based BRM team to race alongside Graham Hill. The highlight of his time at BRM was finishing equal-second (with Hill) in the 1963 World Championship. Ginther scored more points than his British teammate over the whole season, but only a driver's six best scores were counted towards the championship.

Ginther's reputation as a solid "team player" and excellent test and development driver earned him an invitation to join the works Honda F1 team for 1965, for whom he scored his one and only GP win, at the 1965 Mexican Grand Prix. The win was also Honda's first in Formula One. Ginther averaged 151.7 kilometres per hour (94.3 mph) over the curving 5 kilometres (3.1 mi) track in the 65 lap Mexico City event. His speed eclipsed the previous course record of 150.185 km/h (93.321 mph) established by Dan Gurney in 1964. It was the first time Honda had entered the Mexican Grand Prix. Honda reentered international competition in the 1966 Italian Grand Prix. The team was three years old and had encountered difficulty in the preparation of a larger engine. Ginther led in Italy before his car crashed into a retaining wall and he broke his collarbone. He signed with the Eagle F1 team in 1967 and raced in the Race of Champions. His last race entered was the Monaco Grand Prix, but he failed to qualify.

Ginther won one race, achieved 14 podiums, and scored a total of 107 championship points.

Ginther appeared in an uncredited role in the 1966 film Grand Prix as John Hogarth, a driver in the Japanese funded "Yamura" team. He also acted as one of the technical racing advisors for the movie.

While making an attempt to qualify for the 1967 Indianapolis 500, Ginther broke a fuel line in his American Eagle Indy Car. A mix of ethanol and gasoline, was sprayed down his back. This experience, along with the recent fiery death of close friend Lorenzo Bandini, along with other factors, led to his sudden retirement.

Ginther participated in a rally with sixty-five other competitors, including actor James Garner, in June 1969. The California Sports Car Club event was three hours cross country from Los Angeles to Huntington Beach. It benefited students from the Braille Institute. Ginther managed a Porsche 911S with two American drivers during the 39th 24 hours of Le Mans, in June 1971.

== Death ==
Ginther died of a heart attack while on vacation with his family in France, in Touzac, near Bordeaux, on September 20, 1989.

== Awards ==
Ginther was inducted into the Motorsports Hall of Fame of America in 2008.

== Biography ==
In 2020, to mark what would have been Ginther's 90th birthday, a biography was released about Richie's life and career by Richard Jenkins, published by Performance Publishing. "Richie Ginther: Motor Racing's Free Thinker" won the RAC Motoring Book of the Year Award for its depth of research and previously unpublished information

== Racing record ==
=== Formula One World Championship results ===
(key) (Races in italics indicate fastest lap)

Year	Entrant	Chassis	Engine	1	2	3	4	5	6	7	8	9	10	11	WDC	Pts.
1960	Scuderia Ferrari	Ferrari 246P	Ferrari	ARG	MON; 6	500									9th	8
1960	Scuderia Ferrari	Ferrari Dino 246	Ferrari				NED; 6	BEL				ITA; 2	USA		9th	8
1960	Reventlow Automobiles Inc	Scarab F1	Scarab						FRA; DNS	GBR	POR				9th	8
1961	Scuderia Ferrari	Ferrari 156	Ferrari	MON; 2	NED; 5	BEL; 3	FRA; Ret	GBR; 3	GER; 8	ITA; Ret	USA; DNA				5th	16
1962	Owen Racing Organisation	BRM P48/57	BRM	NED; Ret	MON; Ret										8th	10
1962	Owen Racing Organisation	BRM P57	BRM			BEL; 13	FRA; 3	GBR; 13	GER; 8	ITA; 2	USA; Ret	RSA; 7			8th	10
1963	Owen Racing Organisation	BRM P57	BRM	MON; 2	BEL; 4	NED; 5	FRA; Ret	GBR; 4	GER; 3	ITA; 2	USA; 2	MEX; 3	RSA; Ret		**3rd**	**29 (34)**
1964	Owen Racing Organisation	BRM P261	BRM	MON; 2	NED; 11	BEL; 4	FRA; 5	GBR; 8	GER; 7	AUT; 2	ITA; 4	USA; 4	MEX; 8		5th	23
1965	Honda R&D Co	Honda RA272	Honda	RSA	MON; Ret	BEL; 6	FRA; Ret	GBR; Ret	NED; 6	GER	ITA; Ret	USA; 7	MEX; 1		7th	11
1966	Cooper Car Company	Cooper T81	Maserati	MON; Ret	BEL; 5	FRA	GBR	NED	GER						11th	5
1966	Honda R&D Co	Honda RA273	Honda							ITA; Ret	USA; NC	MEX; 4			11th	5
1967	Anglo American Racers	Eagle Mk1	Weslake	RSA	MON; DNQ										NC	0
1967	Advance Muffler/Bruce Bromme	Eagle Mk1	Weslake			NED; DNA	BEL	FRA	GBR	GER	CAN	ITA	USA	MEX	NC	0

=== Non-Championship Formula One results ===
(key)

Year	Entrant	Chassis	Engine	1	2	3	4	5	6	7	8	9	10	11	12	13	14	15	16	17	18	19	20	21
1960	Scuderia Ferrari	Ferrari 246	Ferrari V6	GLV	INT	SIL; 9	LOM	OUL																
1961	Scuderia Ferrari	Ferrari 156	Ferrari	LOM	GLV	PAU	BRX	VIE	AIN	SYR; WD	NAP	LON	SIL	SOL	KAN	DAN	MOD	FLG	OUL	LEW	VAL	RAN	NAT	RSA
1962	Owen Racing Organisation	BRM P578	BRM	CAP	BRX	LOM; WD	LAV	GLV; 10	PAU	AIN; Ret	INT; Ret	NAP	MAL	CLP	RMS; Ret	SOL	KAN	MED	DAN	**OUL**; Ret	MEX	RAN; 15	NAT; 3	
1963	Owen Racing Organisation	BRM P578	BRM	LOM; 5	GLV; Ret	PAU	IMO	SYR	AIN; 4	INT; Ret	ROM	SOL	KAN	MED	AUT	OUL; 2	RAN							
1964	Owen Racing Organisation	BRM P261	BRM	DMT; WD	NWT	SYR	AIN; DNS	INT; WD	SOL	MED	RAN													
1966	Stirling Moss Racing Team	BRP	BRM V8	RSA; Ret	SYR																			
1966	Cooper Car Company	Cooper T81	Maserati			INT; Ret	OUL																	
1967	Anglo American Racers	Eagle Mk1	Weslake	ROC; 10	SPC	INT	SYR	OUL	ESP															

=== Complete British Saloon Car Championship results ===
(key) (Races in bold indicate pole position; races in italics indicate fastest lap.)

Year	Team	Car	Class	1	2	3	4	5	6	7	8	9	10	11	Pos.	Pts	Class
1963	John Willment Automobiles	Ford Cortina GT	B	SNE	OUL	GOO	AIN	SIL; Ret	CRY; 8†	SIL	BRH	BRH	OUL	SIL	29th	6	12th

† Events with 2 races staged for the different classes.

=== 24 Hours of Le Mans results ===
Year	Team	Co-Driver(s)	Car	Class	Laps	Pos.	Class Pos.
1957	(France) Equipe Los Amigos	(France) François Picard	Ferrari 500 TRC	S 2.0	129	DNF	DNF
1960	(Italy) Scuderia Ferrari	(Belgium) Willy Mairesse	Ferrari 250 TRI/60	S 3.0	204	DNF	DNF
1961	(Italy) SEFAC Ferrari	(Germany) Wolfgang von Trips	Ferrari 246 SP	S 2.5	231	DNF	DNF
1962	(United Kingdom) David Brown Racing Dept.	(United Kingdom) Graham Hill	Aston Martin DP212	E +3.0	78	DNF	DNF
1963	(United Kingdom) Owen Racing Organisation	(United Kingdom) Graham Hill	Rover-BRM	Exp.	310	NC	NC
1964	(United States) Ford Motor Company	(United States) Masten Gregory	Ford GT40	P 5.0	63	DNF	DNF
1966	(United States) North American Racing Team	(Mexico) Pedro Rodríguez	Ferrari 330 P3 Spyder	P 5.0	151	DNF	DNF

== Personal life ==
Ginther married his wife, Jacqueline, in 1958. The couple had one child, a son, born in 1962.

== See also ==
- Formula One drivers from the United States
