= Menato Boffa =

Italian racing driver

- Born: 4 January 1930; Benevento, Italy
- Died: 28 September 1996 (aged 66)

Formula One World Championship career
- Nationality: (Italy) Italian
- Active years: 1961
- Team: privateer Cooper
- Entries: 1 (0 starts)
- Championships: 0
- Wins: 0
- Podiums: 0
- Career points: 0
- Pole positions: 0
- Fastest laps: 0
- First entry: 1961 Italian Grand Prix

Menato Boffa (4 January 1930 – 28 September 1996) was an Italian racing driver.

Boffa raced in Formula Junior in 1960, and the following year, he entered four non-championship Formula One races with a Cooper T45. In the poorly attended 1961 Vienna Grand Prix he qualified fourth and was classified fifth, albeit 14 laps down on the winner. At Syracuse he started 17th and finished ninth, seven laps down. However, in Naples he retired on lap five after an accident with Keith Greene, and later in the year he failed to qualify for the Modena Grand Prix where he was 3.5 seconds slower than pole-sitter Stirling Moss. The following week, he was on the entry list for the 1961 Italian Grand Prix but withdrew before the event. After the 1961 season, Boffa moved away from Formula One and did not participate at that level again.

== Complete Formula One World Championship results ==
(key)

Year	Entrant	Chassis	Engine	1	2	3	4	5	6	7	8	WDC	Points
1961	Menato Boffa	Cooper T45	Climax Straight-4	MON	NED	BEL	FRA	GBR	GER	ITA; DNA	USA	NC	0

=== Non-championship Formula One results ===
(key)

Year	Entrant	Chassis	Engine	1	2	3	4	5	6	7	8	9	10	11	12	13	14	15	16	17	18	19	20	21
1961	Menato Boffa	Cooper T45	Climax Straight-4	LOM	GLV	PAU	BRX	VIE; 5	AIN	SYR; 9	NAP; Ret	LON	SIL	SOL	KAN	DAN	MOD; DNQ	FLG	OUL	LEW	VAL	RAN	NAT	RSA
