= Ernesto Prinoth =

Italian racing driver (1923–1981)

- Born: 15 April 1923; Urtijëi, South Tyrol, Italy
- Died: 26 November 1981 (aged 58); Innsbruck, Tyrol, Austria

Formula One World Championship career
- Nationality: (Italy) Italian
- Active years: 1962
- Team: non-works Lotus
- Entries: 1 (0 starts)
- Championships: 0
- Wins: 0
- Podiums: 0
- Career points: 0
- Pole positions: 0
- Fastest laps: 0
- First entry: 1962 Italian Grand Prix

Ernesto Prinoth (15 April 1923 – 26 November 1981) was a racing driver from Italy, and founder of Prinoth AG, manufacturer of snow grooming vehicles and equipment.

Prinoth started in Formula One in 1961 with his Lotus 18, racing in various non-Championship events, securing podium finishes in two relatively minor races. He entered the 1962 Italian Grand Prix with backing from Scuderia Jolly Club but failed to qualify, and this was his only attempt at a World Championship Formula One event. He returned in 1963 for two more Formula One races, all his appearances being at the wheel of the same car.

Prinoth's son Erich was also a racing driver, and competed in the Ferrari Challenge.

== Racing record ==
=== Complete Formula One World Championship results ===
(key)

Year	Entrant	Chassis	Engine	1	2	3	4	5	6	7	8	9	WDC	Points
1961	Scuderia Dolomiti	Lotus 18	Climax Straight-4	MON	NED	BEL	FRA	GBR	GER	ITA; DNA	USA		NC	0
1962	Scuderia Jolly Club	Lotus 18	Climax Straight-4	NED	MON	BEL	FRA	GBR	GER	ITA; DNQ	USA	RSA	NC	0

=== Non-Championship Formula One results ===
(key)

Year	Entrant	Chassis	Engine	1	2	3	4	5	6	7	8	9	10	11	12	13	14	15	16	17	18	19	20	21
1961	Scuderia Dolomiti	Lotus 18	Climax Straight-4	LOM	GLV	PAU	BRX	VIE; 3	AIN	SYR; DNQ	NAP; 9	LON	SIL	SOL	KAN	DAN	MOD; DNA	FLG; Ret	OUL	LEW	VAL; 2	RAN	NAT	RSA
1963	Ernesto Prinoth	Lotus 18	Climax Straight-4	LOM	GLV	PAU	IMO; 8	SYR	AIN	INT	ROM	SOL	KAN	MED										
1963	Scuderia Jolly Club	Lotus 18	Climax Straight-4												AUT; Ret	OUL	RAN							
