= Lorenzo Bandini =

Italian racing driver (1935–1967)

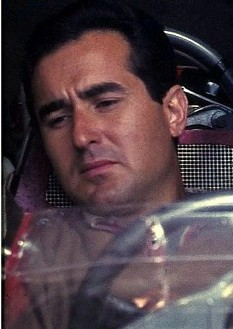
- Bandini in 1966
- Born: 21 December 1935; Barce, Italian Libya
- Died: 10 May 1967 (aged 31); Monte Carlo, Monaco
- Cause of death: Injuries sustained at the 1967 Monaco Grand Prix

Formula One World Championship career
- Nationality: (Italy) Italian
- Active years: 1961–1967
- Team(s): Centro Sud, Ferrari
- Entries: 42
- Championships: 0
- Wins: 1
- Podiums: 8
- Career points: 58
- Pole positions: 1
- Fastest laps: 2
- First entry: 1961 Belgian Grand Prix
- First win: 1964 Austrian Grand Prix
- Last entry: 1967 Monaco Grand Prix

24 Hours of Le Mans career
- Years: 1962–1966
- Teams: Ferrari
- Best finish: 1st (1963)
- Class wins: 1 (1963)

Lorenzo Bandini (21 December 1935 – 10 May 1967) was an Italian racing driver, who competed in Formula One from 1961 to 1967. Bandini won the 1964 Austrian Grand Prix with Ferrari. In endurance racing, Bandini won the 24 Hours of Le Mans in 1963, as well as the 24 Hours of Daytona in 1967, both with Ferrari.

Born in Libya and raised in Florence, Bandini was initially a mechanic before competing in motorcycle racing. His racing career started in 1957, driving a borrowed Fiat 1100, before he achieved a class win at the Mille Miglia one year later. He soon progressed to Formula Junior, where he attracted the attention of Enzo Ferrari. Bandini made his Formula One debut in 1961 with Scuderia Centro Sud, before signing for Ferrari the following year.

On debut for Ferrari at the Monaco Grand Prix, Bandini finished third behind Bruce McLaren and teammate Phil Hill, claiming his maiden podium finish. He competed at seven Grands Prix in 1963 for both teams, amongst winning the 24 Hours of Le Mans and finishing runner-up at the 12 Hours of Sebring, driving the Ferrari 250 P. Bandini retained his seat at Ferrari in 1964, scoring his sole victory at the Austrian Grand Prix—amongst several further podiums—on his way to a career-best fourth in the World Drivers' Championship. He scored several podiums in his 1965 and 1966 campaigns, finishing the seasons in sixth and ninth, respectively.

During the 1967 Monaco Grand Prix, Bandini was fatally injured when his Ferrari 312 overturned and caught fire. The Lorenzo Bandini Trophy was established in memorial of Bandini, honouring individuals and teams for achievements in Formula One since 1992.

== Early life ==
Bandini was born in Barce in Cyrenaica, Libya, then an Italian colony. The family returned to Italy in 1939 and moved near Florence. His father died when he was 15. Bandini left home and found a job as an apprentice mechanic in the Freddi workshop in Milan.

== Racing career ==
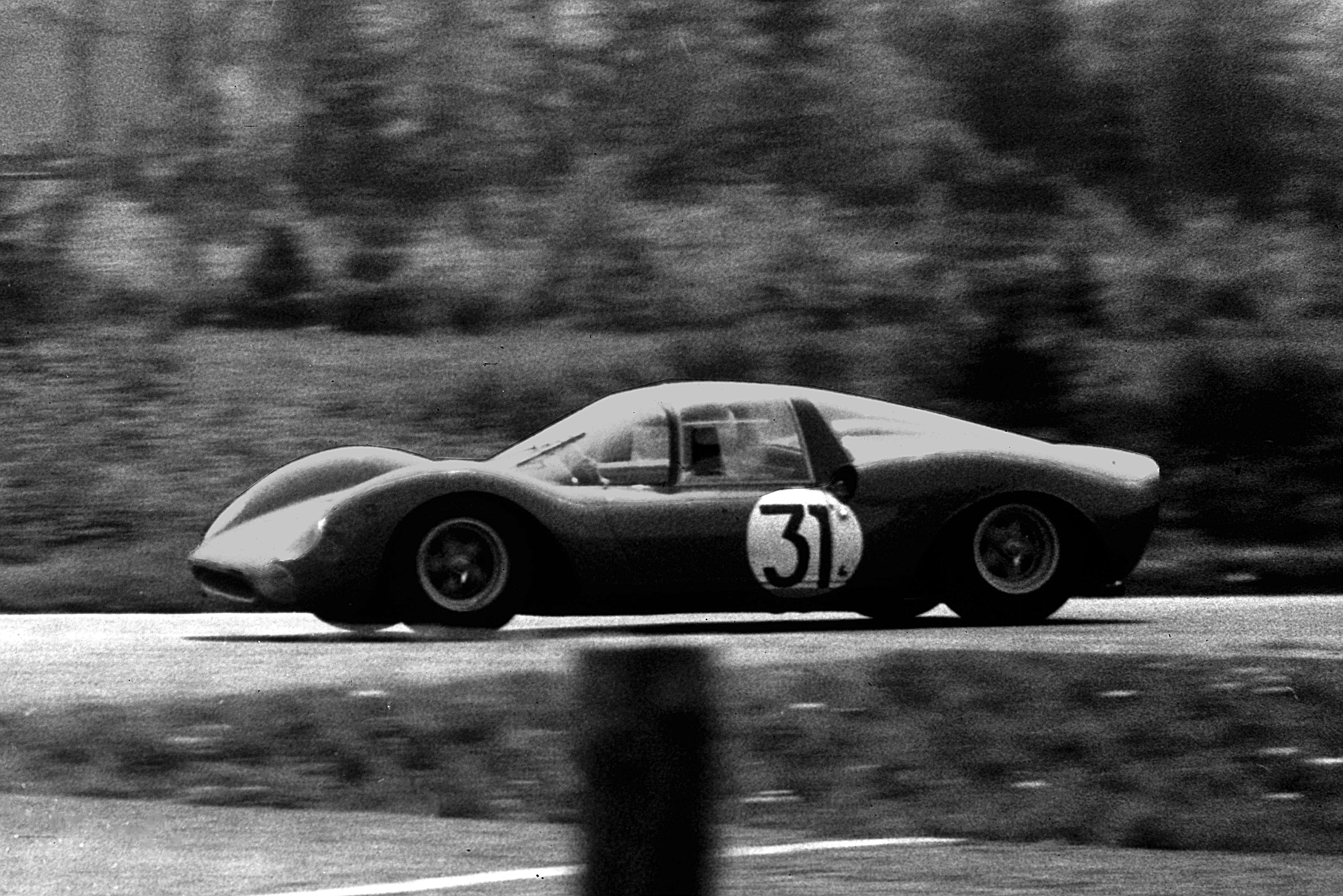
Bandini at 1965 1000km Nürburgring with Dino 166 P

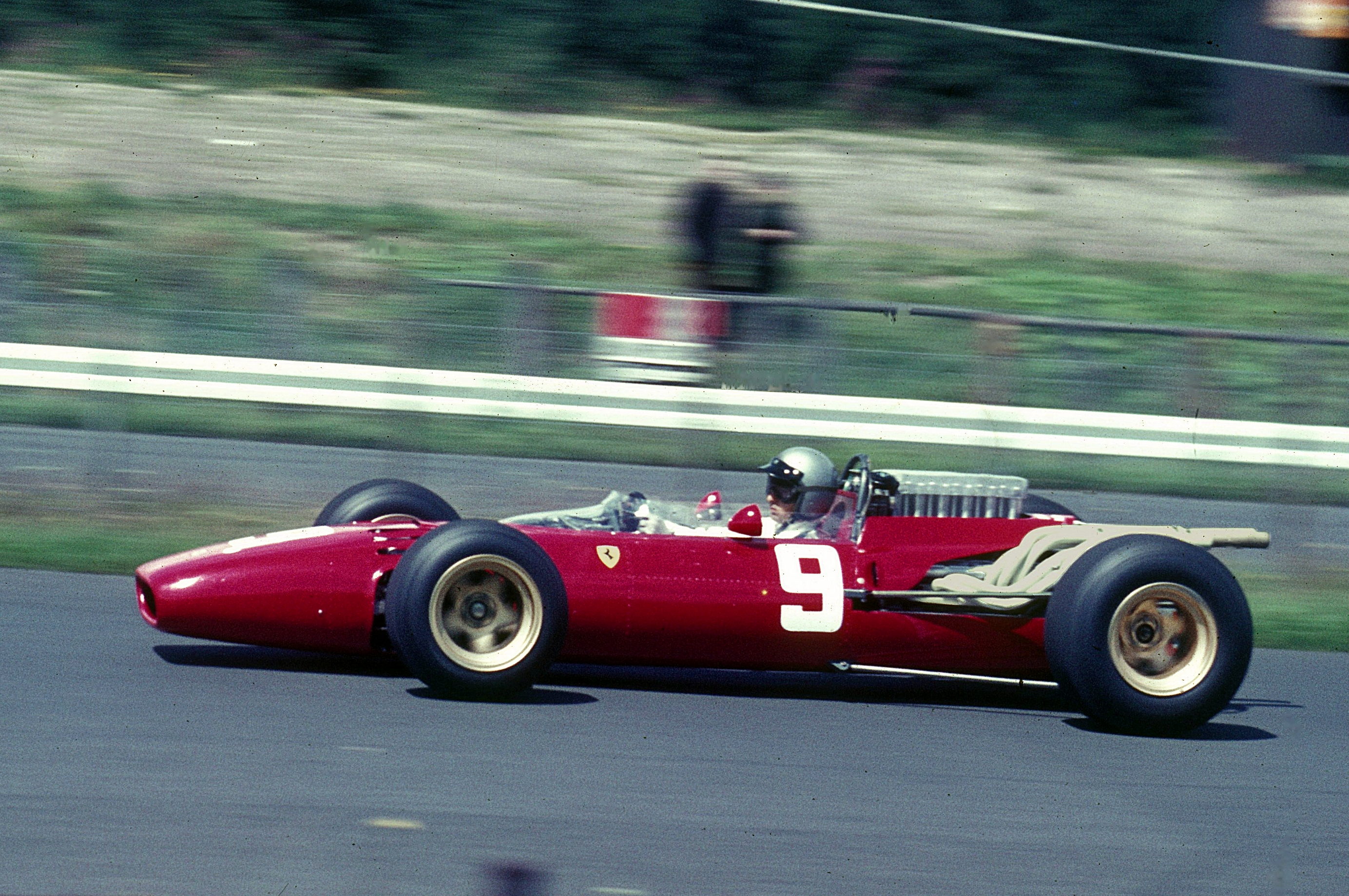
Bandini at 1966 German Grand Prix with Ferrari 312

Bandini made his way into auto racing from competing on motorcycles. He started racing cars in 1957 in a borrowed Fiat 1100. Goliardo Freddi, acknowledging Bandini's talent, decided to support him. Bandini would later marry Freddi's daughter, Margherita, in 1963, and remained involved with the family's garage in Milan.

Bandini achieved a first class victory at the Mille Miglia, in a Lancia Appia Zagato, in 1958, and a class win the same year in the 500cc Berkeley in the 12-hour race at Monza. He then purchased a Volpini Formula Junior car and placed third in his first race in Sicily. In 1959 and 1960 he drove a Formula Junior Stanguellini. In 1960 he placed fourth in the Formula Junior World Championship.

In 1961, Bandini and fellow Italian driver Giancarlo Baghetti were both in contention for a Formula One seat at Scuderia Ferrari. Ferrari opted for Baghetti, and Bandini went to drive for Guglielmo "Mimmo" Dei's Scuderia Centro Sud. At a non-championship race, he finished third at Pau. Bandini drove his first world championship race at Spa later in 1961. He retired with engine failure. During the winter of 1961-1962 he drove in the Tasman races in Australia and New Zealand.

In 1962, Bandini was hired by Ferrari for the 1962 and 1963 seasons, and moved to Maranello, near the team's headquarters. His debut in a works Ferrari at the Monaco Grand Prix, finishing third. For 1963, Bandini was retained by Ferrari for sports car races only. Along with Ludovico Scarfiotti, he won the Le Mans 24 Hours race and placed second in the Targa Florio that year, occasionally racing in Formula One for Scuderia Centro Sud. His string of good results, including a fifth place at the British Grand Prix, convinced Ferrari to retain him as a Formula One driver as well for the rest of the season.

In 1964, Bandini had his best Formula One season. He won the first Austrian Grand Prix at the Zeltweg circuit and scored two more podiums in Germany and Italy. At the Mexican Grand Prix, Bandini was running second when he decided to let his teammate John Surtees pass, enabling him to score enough points to win the World Championship. In 1965, Bandini won the Targa Florio.

In 1966, Surtees left Ferrari in mid-season. Bandini was promoted to team leader. He was unlucky not to win the French and U.S. Grands Prix that year which he dominated before mechanical problems struck while holding a huge lead. Bandini's best finish was a second place at the Monaco Grand Prix in a 2.4 liter V-6 Ferrari behind Jackie Stewart's BRM. Later in the season Bandini helped director John Frankenheimer with his movie Grand Prix. Bandini recommended the location at the harbour chicane for a crash scene in the movie filmed at the Monte Carlo circuit. In "The Making of Grand Prix", actress Eva Marie Saint noted bitterly that this spot would be the site of Bandini's fatal accident in the race one year later. Grand Prix was praised for its realism of racing, to which Bandini played a big role. The movie won 3 Oscars. In 1967, Bandini won the 24 Hours of Daytona and the 1000 km of Monza, both teamed with Chris Amon.

== Accident and death ==
On 7 May 1967, Bandini was racing at the Monaco Grand Prix for Scuderia Ferrari, running second to Denny Hulme. On the entry to the harbour chicane on the 82nd lap he lost control of his open-wheel 312, its left rear wheel hit the guard rail, and sent it into an erratic skid. Impacting a light pole, the car overturned, collided with protective straw bales which lined the harbour, and trapped Bandini beneath it. Either sparks ignited fuel from a ruptured tank, or fuel leaked from it onto a hot brake line or exhaust pipe and it burst into flames. Bandini was pulled out, unconscious; a second fire occurred afterwards, due to reignition.

Bandini, who had only ever had a minor accident in his racing career, during a 1957 Formula Junior race, was gravely injured. Sustaining third degree burns covering more than 70% of his body, a chest wound, and ten chest fractures, he succumbed three days later at the Princess Grace Polyclinic Hospital in Monte Carlo. He was 31 years old. Though concerns were raised about the promptness of his rescue, investigators from the Principality of Monaco ruled on 10 May that the security operation had "functioned properly." Straw bales were immediately banned from all Formula One races, and replaced by an extended guard-rail in Monaco the following year. Bandini's funeral was held in Reggiolo on 13 May. 100,000 people attended. He was later buried in the Lambrate cemetery, in Milan.

== In popular culture ==
Bandini is portrayed by Francesco Bauco in Ford v Ferrari, a 2019 film about the rivalry between Ford and Ferrari at the 1966 24 Hours of Le Mans auto race.

== Racing record ==
=== Complete Formula One results ===
(key) (Races in bold indicate pole position; races in italics indicate fastest lap)

Year	Entrant	Chassis	Engine	1	2	3	4	5	6	7	8	9	10	11	WDC	Pts
1961	Scuderia Centro Sud	Cooper T53	Maserati 6-1500 1.5 L4	MON	NED	BEL; Ret	FRA	GBR; 12	GER; Ret	ITA; 8	USA				NC	0
1962	Scuderia Ferrari SpA SEFAC	Ferrari 156	Ferrari 178 1.5 V6	NED	MON; 3	BEL	FRA	GBR	GER; Ret	ITA; 8	USA	RSA			12th	4
1963	Scuderia Centro Sud	BRM P57	BRM P56 1.5 V8	MON	BEL	NED	FRA; 10	GBR; 5	GER; Ret						10th	6
1963	Scuderia Ferrari SpA SEFAC	Ferrari 156	Ferrari 178 1.5 V6							ITA; Ret	USA; 5	MEX; Ret	RSA; 5		10th	6
1964	Scuderia Ferrari SpA SEFAC	Ferrari 156	Ferrari 178 1.5 V6	MON; 10				GBR; 5	GER; 3	AUT; 1					4th	23
1964	Scuderia Ferrari SpA SEFAC	Ferrari 158	Ferrari 205B 1.5 V8		NED; Ret	BEL; Ret	FRA; 9				ITA; 3				4th	23
1964	North American Racing Team	Ferrari 1512	Ferrari 207 1.5 F12									USA; Ret	MEX; 3		4th	23
1965	Scuderia Ferrari SpA SEFAC	Ferrari 1512	Ferrari 207 1.5 F12	RSA; 15	MON; 2	BEL; 9	FRA; 8				ITA; 4	USA; 4	MEX; 8		6th	13
1965	Scuderia Ferrari SpA SEFAC	Ferrari 158	Ferrari 205B 1.5 V8					GBR; Ret	NED; 9	GER; 6					6th	13
1966	Scuderia Ferrari SpA SEFAC	Ferrari 246	Ferrari 228 2.4 V6	MON; 2	BEL; 3										9th	12
1966	Scuderia Ferrari SpA SEFAC	Ferrari 312/66	Ferrari 218 3.0 V12			**FRA**; NC	GBR	NED; 6	GER; 6	ITA; Ret	USA; Ret	MEX			9th	12
1967	Scuderia Ferrari SpA SEFAC	Ferrari 312/67	Ferrari 242 3.0 V12	RSA	MON; Ret	NED	BEL	FRA	GBR	GER	CAN	ITA	USA	MEX	NC	0

=== Complete Formula One Non-Championship results ===
(key) (Races in bold indicate pole position) (Races in italics indicate fastest lap)

Year	Entrant	Chassis	Engine	1	2	3	4	5	6	7	8	9	10	11	12	13	14	15	16	17	18	19	20	21
1961	Scuderia Centro Sud	Cooper T53	Maserati 6-1500 1.5 L4	LOM	GLV	PAU; 3	BRX	VIE	AIN	SYR; 7	NAP; 3	LON	SIL	SOL	KAN	DAN	MOD; Ret	FLG; DNS						
1961	Scuderia Centro Sud	Cooper T51	Maserati 6-1500 1.5 L4															FLG; NC	OUL	LEW	VAL	RAN	NAT	RSA
1962	Scuderia Ferrari SpA SEFAC	Ferrari 156	Ferrari 178 1.5 V6	CAP	BRX	LOM	LAV	GLV	PAU; 5	AIN	INT	**NAP**; 2	MAL	CLP	RMS	SOL	KAN	**MED**; 1	DAN	OUL	MEX	RAN	NAT	
1963	Scuderia Centro Sud	Cooper T53	Maserati 6-1500 1.5 L4	LOM	GLV	PAU	IMO; Ret	SYR; Ret	AIN															
1963	Scuderia Centro Sud	BRM P57	BRM P56 1.5 V8							INT; DSQ	ROM	SOL; 4	KAN	MED; 3	AUT	OUL								
1963	Scuderia Ferrari SpA SEFAC	Ferrari 156	Ferrari 178 1.5 V6														RAN; 2							
1964	Scuderia Ferrari SpA SEFAC	Ferrari 156	Ferrari 178 1.5 V6	DMT	NWT	**SYR**; 2	AIN	INT	SOL; Ret	MED	RAN													
1965	Scuderia Ferrari SpA SEFAC	Ferrari 1512	Ferrari 207 1.5 F12	ROC	SYR; 3	SMT	INT; 7	MED	RAN															
1966	Scuderia Ferrari SpA SEFAC	Ferrari 246	Ferrari 228 2.4 V6	RSA	SYR; 2	INT	OUL																	
1967	Scuderia Ferrari SpA SEFAC	Ferrari 312/67	Ferrari 242 3.0 V12	ROC; 2	SPC	INT	SYR	OUL	ESP															

=== Complete 24 Hours of Le Mans results ===
Year	Team	Co-Drivers	Car	Class	Laps	Pos.	Class Pos.
1962	(Italy) SEFAC Ferrari	(United Kingdom) Mike Parkes	Ferrari 330 LMB	E+3.0	56	DNF (Radiator)	
1963	(Italy) SpA Ferrari SEFAC	(Italy) Ludovico Scarfiotti	Ferrari 250 P	P3.0	339	**1st**	**1st**
1964	(Italy) SpA Ferrari SEFAC	(United Kingdom) John Surtees	Ferrari 330 P	P4.0	337	**3rd**	**3rd**
1965	(Italy) SpA Ferrari SEFAC	(Italy) Giampiero Biscaldi	Ferrari 275 P2	P4.0	221	DNF (Valves)	
1966	(Italy) SpA Ferrari SEFAC	(France) Jean Guichet	Ferrari 330 P3	P5.0	226	DNF (Engine)	

=== Complete 12 Hours of Sebring results ===
Year	Team	Co-Drivers	Car	Class	Laps	Pos.	Class Pos.
1963	(Italy) S.E.F.A.C. Ferrari	(Belgium) Willy Mairesse (Italy) Nino Vaccarella	Ferrari 250 P	P3.0	208	**2nd**	**2nd**
1963	(Italy) S.E.F.A.C. Ferrari	(United Kingdom) Mike Parkes	Ferrari 330 LMB	P+3.0	72	DNF (Split fuel tank)	
1964	(Italy) S.E.F.A.C. Ferrari	(United Kingdom) John Surtees	Ferrari 330 P	P+3.0	212	**3rd**	**3rd**
1966	(Italy) SpA Ferrari SEFAC	(Italy) Ludovico Scarfiotti	Ferrari Dino 206 S	P2.0	206	5th	**2nd**

=== Complete 24 Hours of Daytona results ===
Year	Team	Co-Drivers	Car	Class	Laps	Pos.	Class Pos.
1967	(Italy) Ferrari SpA	(New Zealand) Chris Amon	Ferrari 330 P3/4	P+2.0	666	**1st**	**1st**

== See also ==
- Formula One drivers from Italy
- Lorenzo Bandini Trophy

Sporting positions
Preceded by Olivier Gendebien; Phil Hill	Winner of the 24 Hours of Le Mans; 1963; With: Ludovico Scarfiotti	Succeeded by Jean Guichet; Nino Vaccarella
Preceded by John Taylor	Formula One fatal accidents 7 May 1967 (Date of accident); 10 May 1967 (Date of death)	Succeeded by Bob Anderson
