= Wolfgang Seidel =

German racing driver (1926–1987)

- Born: 4 July 1926; Dresden, Germany
- Died: 1 March 1987 (aged 60); Munich, Germany

Formula One World Championship career
- Nationality: (West Germany) West German
- Active years: 1953, 1958, 1960–1962
- Team(s): Non-works Lotus, Cooper, Emeryson, Veritas and Maserati
- Entries: 12 (10 starts)
- Championships: 0
- Wins: 0
- Podiums: 0
- Career points: 0
- Pole positions: 0
- Fastest laps: 0
- First entry: 1953 German Grand Prix
- Last entry: 1962 German Grand Prix

Wolfgang Seidel (4 July 1926 – 1 March 1987) was a racing driver from Germany. He participated in 12 Formula One World Championship Grands Prix, debuting on 2 August 1953. He scored no championship points.

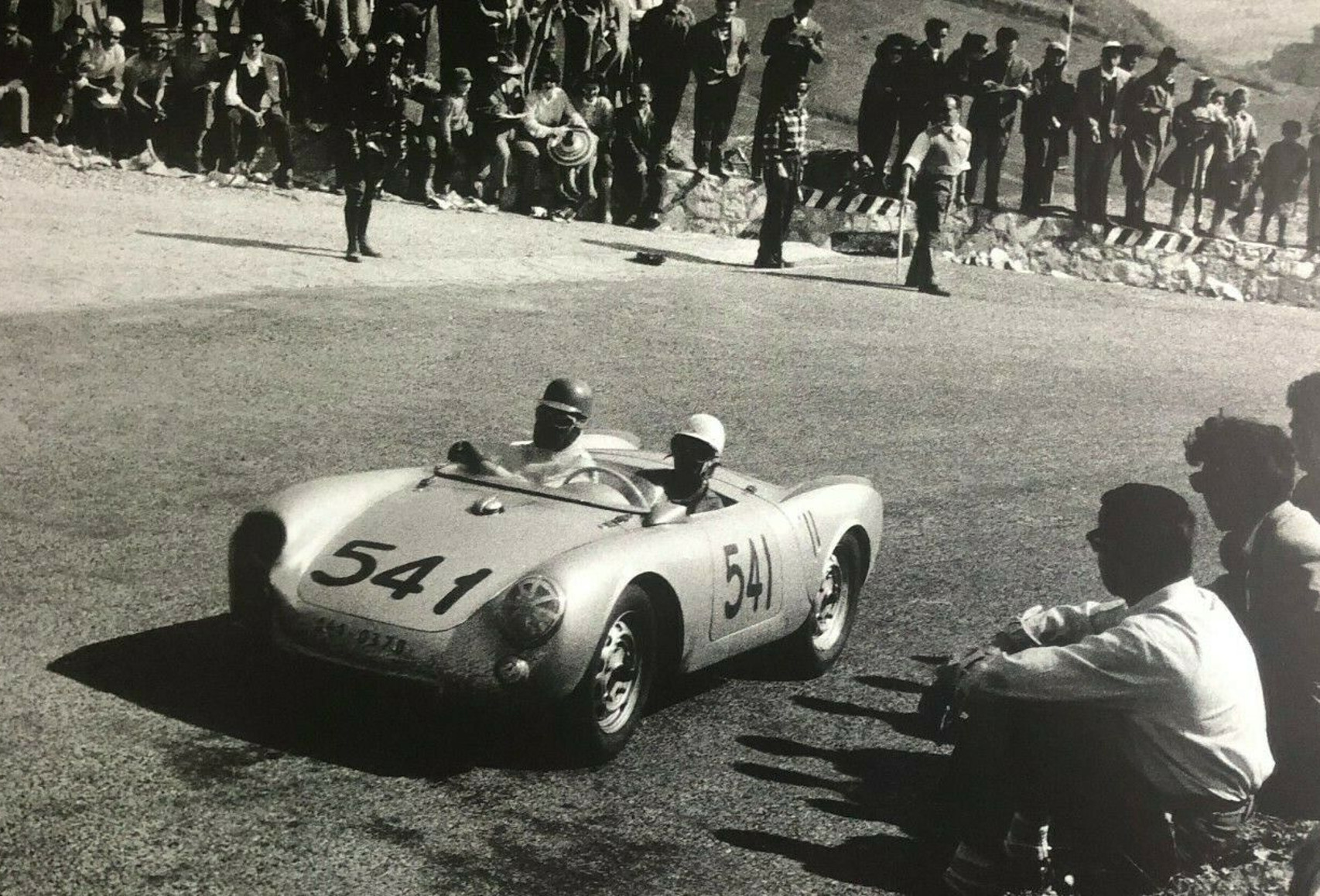
Seidel and Helm Glöckler in Porsche 550-015 at the 1955 Mille Miglia, finishing 8th

Seidel and Edgar Barth won the 1959 Targa Florio, driving a Porsche 718 RSK, giving Porsche its first ever World Sports Car Championship race win.

Seidel often entered cars under his own name, or under the Scuderia Colonia banner. After having been refused a start at the 1962 German Grand Prix due sufficient laps in practice, four at over ten minutes instead of five, a fate shared with several other drivers, Seidel got in an argument with officials from the Automobilclub von Deutschland. Combined with some doubts about the level of preparation of his cars, Dan Gurney had refused to race it in the 1962 Belgian Grand Prix were Porsche remained absent, Seidel's competition licence was withdrawn, and he offered his two cars up for sale. In spite of not having a licence, Seidel competed in the non-championship 1962 Mexican Grand Prix a few months later, to trigger an FIA investigation into his case, for no avail.

Seidel died in 1987 of a heart attack.

== Complete Formula One World Championship results ==
(key)

| Year | Entrant | Chassis | Engine | 1 | 2 | 3 | 4 | 5 | 6 | 7 | 8 | 9 | 10 | 11 | WDC | Points |
|---|---|---|---|---|---|---|---|---|---|---|---|---|---|---|---|---|
| 1953 | Wolfgang Seidel | Veritas RS | Veritas Straight-6 | ARG | 500 | NED | BEL | FRA | GBR | GER; 16 | SUI | ITA | | | NC | 0 |
| 1958 | Scuderia Centro Sud | Maserati 250F | Maserati Straight-6 | ARG | MON | NED | 500 | BEL; Ret | FRA | GBR | | POR | ITA | MOR; Ret | NC | 0 |
| 1958 | RRC Walker Racing Team | Cooper T43 (F2) | Climax Straight-4 | | | | | | | | GER; Ret | | | | NC | 0 |
| 1960 | Wolfgang Seidel | Cooper T45 | Climax Straight-4 | ARG | MON | 500 | NED | BEL | FRA | GBR | POR | ITA; 9 | USA | | NC | 0 |
| 1961 | Scuderia Colonia | Lotus 18 | Climax Straight-4 | MON | NED | BEL; DNS | FRA; DNS | GBR; 17 | GER; Ret | ITA; Ret | USA | | | | NC | 0 |
| 1962 | Ecurie Maarsbergen | Emeryson 1006 | Climax Straight-4 | NED; NC | MON | BEL | FRA | | | | | | | | NC | 0 |
| 1962 | Autosport Team Wolfgang Seidel | Lotus 24 | BRM V8 | | | | | GBR; Ret | GER; DNQ | ITA | USA | RSA | | | NC | 0 |

=== Non-Championship results ===
(key) (Races in bold indicate pole position) (Races in italics indicate fastest lap)

| Year | Entrant | Chassis | Engine | 1 | 2 | 3 | 4 | 5 | 6 | 7 | 8 | 9 | 10 | 11 | 12 | 13 | 14 | 15 | 16 | 17 | 18 | 19 | 20 | 21 |
|---|---|---|---|---|---|---|---|---|---|---|---|---|---|---|---|---|---|---|---|---|---|---|---|---|
| 1958 | Scuderia Centro Sud | Maserati 250F | Maserati Straight-6 | GLV | SYR; Ret | AIN | INT; 17 | CAE | | | | | | | | | | | | | | | | |
| 1961 | Scuderia Colonia | Lotus 18 | Climax Straight-4 | LOM | GLV | PAU; Ret | BRX | VIE; 2 | AIN; WD | SYR; 10 | NAP | LON; 5 | SIL; Ret | SOL; Ret | KAN; WD | DAN | MOD; DNQ | FLG; Ret | OUL; 10 | LEW | VAL | RAN | NAT | RSA |
| 1962 | Autosport Team Wolfgang Seidel | Porsche 718 | Porsche Flat-4 | CAP | BRX; 9 | LOM; 6 | LAV; 7 | GLV; 11 | PAU | AIN; Ret | INT | NAP | MAL | CLP | RMS | | | | | | | | | |
| 1962 | Autosport Team Wolfgang Seidel | Lotus 24 | BRM V8 | | | | | | | | | | | | | SOL; WD | KAN | MED; 8 | DAN; 8 | OUL; EX | MEX; Ret | RAN | NAT | |
