= Shane Summers =

British racing driver

- Born: 23 June 1936; Rossett, Denbighshire, Wales, UK
- Died: 1 June 1961 (aged 24); Brands Hatch, Kent, England, UK

Formula One World Championship career
- Nationality: (United Kingdom) British
- Active years: 1961
- Team: privateer Cooper
- Entries: 7 non-championship races (5 starts)
- Championships: 0
- Wins: 0
- Podiums: 0
- Career points: 0
- Pole positions: 0
- Fastest laps: 0
- First entry: 1961 Lombank Trophy
- Last entry: 1961 Silver City Trophy

Shane Lister Summers (23 June 1936 – 1 June 1961) was a British racing driver, born in Rossett, Denbighshire, Wales. Although he raced in Formula One, he never participated in a World Championship event. He was the son of the Conservative politician Spencer Summers.

In 1960, Summers had a successful season racing a Lotus 15 sports car prepared by Terry Bartram, and for the following season, he and Bartram decided to enter Formula One with a new Cooper T53, chassis number F1-8-61.

At the season opener, the non-Championship Lombank Trophy, 24-year-old Summers qualified tenth of the 14 runners, and finished eighth and last. The following week he crashed out of the Glover Trophy after again qualifying tenth. Travelling to Europe for the next two races, he was refused a start at the 1961 Brussels Grand Prix despite posting the 12th fastest time in qualifying, but started from the front row at the Vienna Grand Prix. From second on the grid, he ran near the front until his suspension failed.

Returning to the UK, Summers entered the Aintree 200, qualifying 13th of 28 starters, and finishing 12th. A month later he achieved his best result, finishing fourth in the London Trophy. However, during practice in the rain for the Silver City Trophy race at Brands Hatch, Summers was killed when he spun at Paddock Hill Bend and crashed into a concrete wall at the pit tunnel entrance.

== Non-championship Formula One results ==
(key)

Year	Entrant	Chassis	Engine	1	2	3	4	5	6	7	8	9	10	11	12	13	14	15	16	17	18	19	20	21
1961	Terry Bartram	Cooper T53	Climax Str-4	LOM; 8	GLV; Ret	PAU	BRX; DNQ	VIE; Ret	AIN; 12	SYR	NAP	LON; 4	SIL; DNS	SOL	KAN	DAN	MOD	FLG	OUL	LEW	VAL	RAN	NAT	RSA
