= 1961 Vienna Grand Prix =

- Non-championship race in the 1961 Formula One season
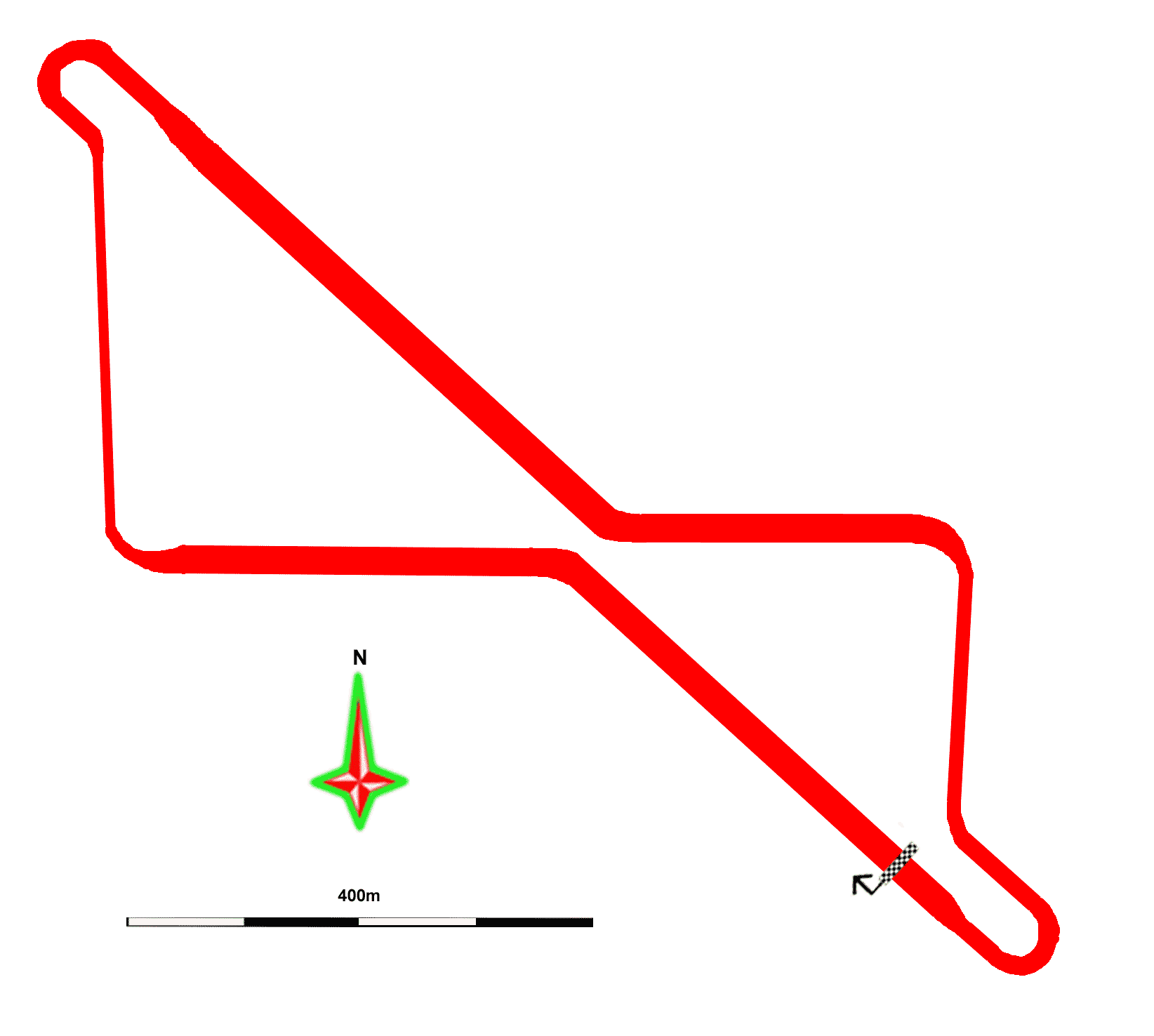

Race details
- Date: 16 April 1961
- Official name: II Grosser Preis von Wien
- Location: Aspern
- Course: Permanent racing facility
- Course length: 2.926 km (1.818 miles)
- Distance: 55 laps, 160.934 km (100 miles)

Pole position
Driver	(United Kingdom) Stirling Moss	Lotus-Climax
- Time: 1:13.6

Fastest lap
Driver	(United Kingdom) Stirling Moss	Lotus-Climax
- Time: 1:12.2

Podium
First	(United Kingdom) Stirling Moss	Lotus-Climax
Second	(Germany) Wolfgang Seidel	Lotus-Climax
Third	(Italy) Ernesto Prinoth	Lotus-Climax

The 2nd Vienna Grand Prix was a motor race, run to Formula One rules, held on 16 April 1961 at Aspern Circuit. The race was run over 55 laps of the circuit, and was won comfortably by British driver Stirling Moss in a Lotus 18.

== Results ==
Pos	Driver	Entrant	Constructor	Time/Retired	Grid
1	(United Kingdom) Stirling Moss	Rob Walker Racing Team	Lotus-Climax	1.10:01.6	1
2	(Germany) Wolfgang Seidel	Scuderia Colonia	Lotus-Climax	+ 51.4 s	6
3	(Italy) Ernesto Prinoth	Scuderia Dolomiti	Lotus-Climax	54 laps	7
4	(France) Bernard Collomb	Bernard Collomb	Cooper-Climax	53 laps	8
5	(Italy) Menato Boffa	Menato Boffa	Cooper-Climax	41 laps	4
6	(United Kingdom) Tim Parnell	Tim Parnell	Lotus-Climax	34 laps	5
7	(United Kingdom) Ronald Wrenn	Team Salvatore Evangelista	Hume-Cooper-Climax	31 laps	9
8	(United Kingdom) Shane Summers	Terry Bartram	Cooper-Climax	23 laps - Suspension	2
Ret	(United Kingdom) Gerry Ashmore	Tim Parnell	Lotus-Climax	Rear brakes	3
WD	(France) Jo Schlesser	Inter-Autocourse	Cooper-Climax	Car not ready	-
WD	(Sweden) Jo Bonnier	Scuderia Colonia	Lotus-Climax	Car not ready	-
WD	(Italy) Giuseppe Maugeri	Giuseppe Maugeri	Cooper-Climax	Car not delivered	-
WD	(Switzerland) "Wal Ever"	"Wal Ever"	Cooper-O.S.C.A.	Car not ready	-

Previous race: 1961 Brussels Grand Prix	Formula One non-championship races 1961 season	Next race: 1961 Aintree 200
Previous race: —	Vienna Grand Prix	Next race: —
