= 1961 Formula One season =

15th season of Formula One motor racing

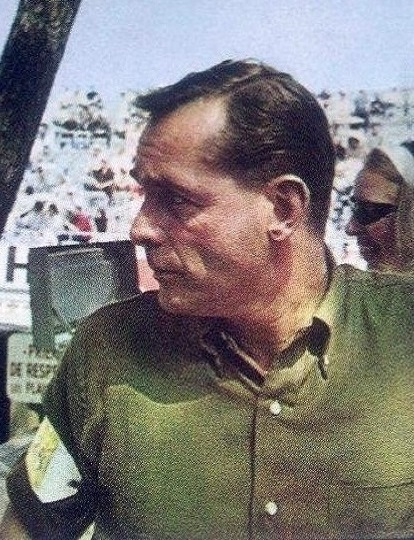
Phil Hill (pictured in 1966) won his first and only championship, driving for Ferrari.

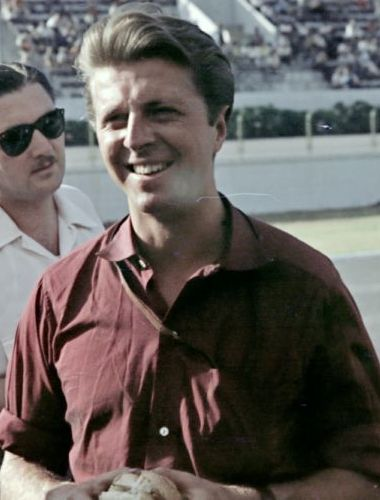
Wolfgang von Trips posthumously finished as runner-up in the World Drivers' Championship, having been killed at the Italian Grand Prix.

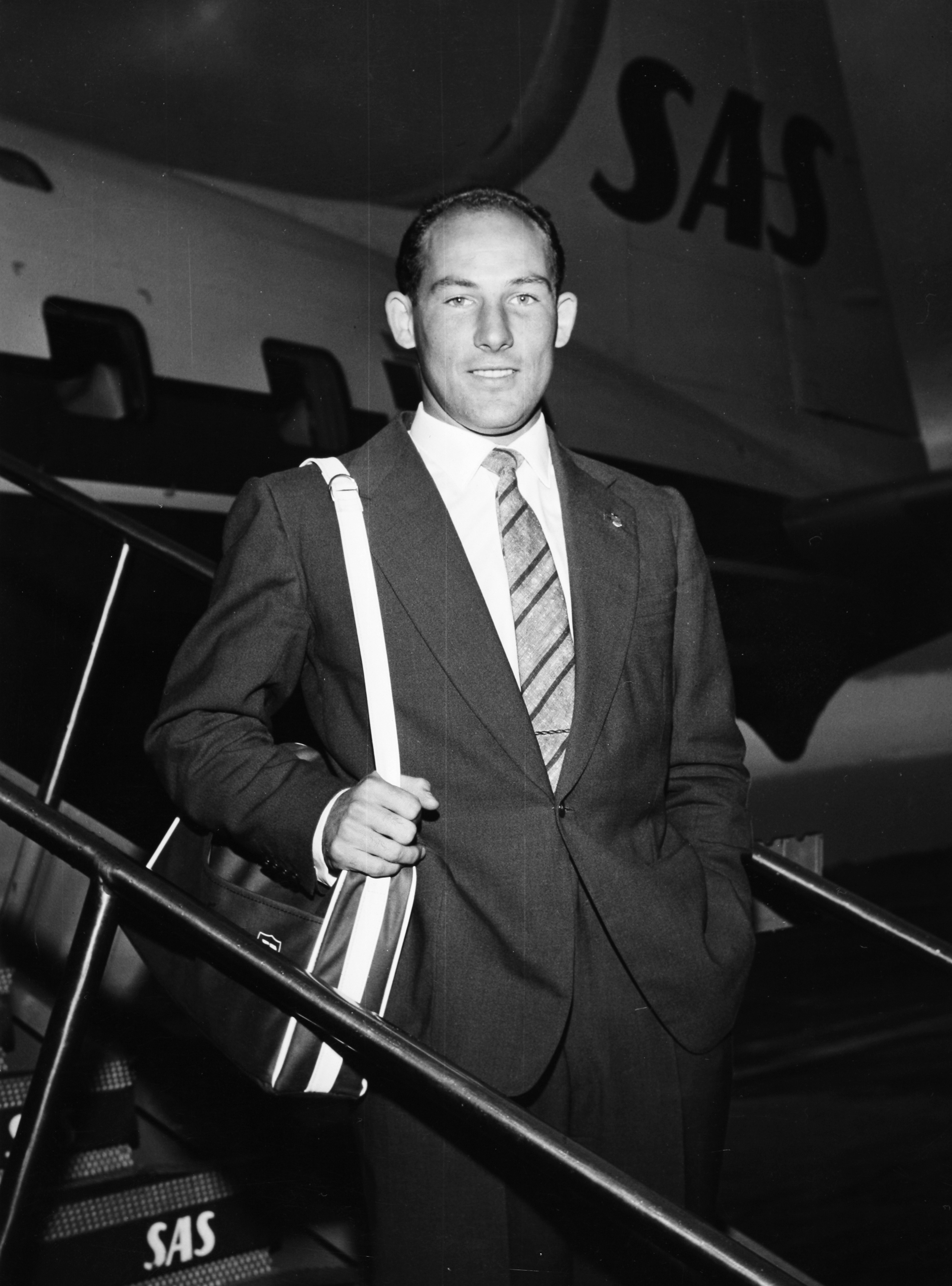
Stirling Moss finished third in his last Formula One season.

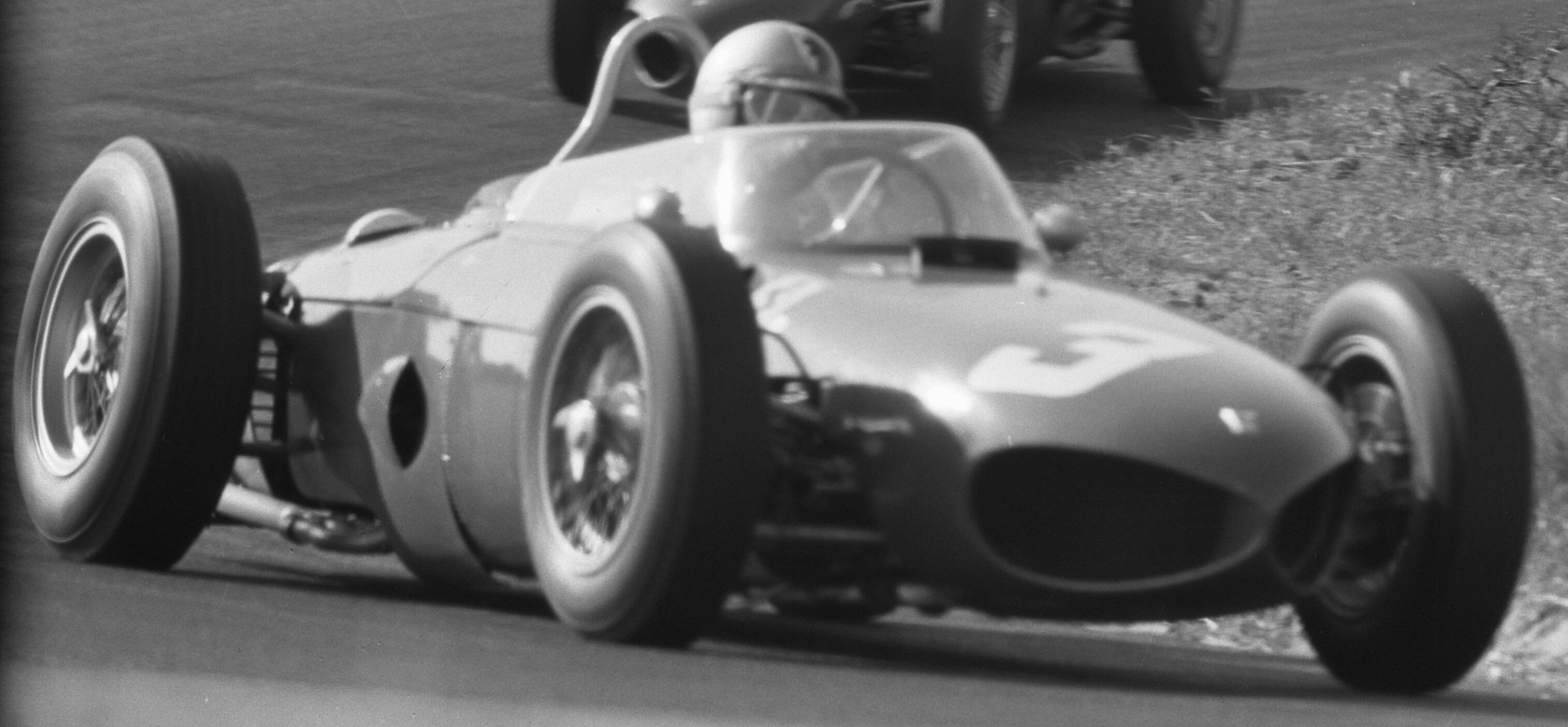
Ferrari won the International Cup for F1 Manufacturers with the Ferrari 156.

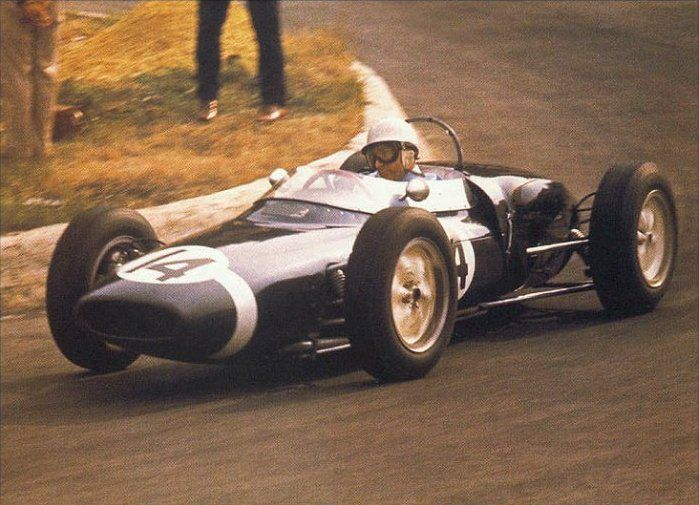
Lotus finished second with the Lotus 18, 18/21 & 21.

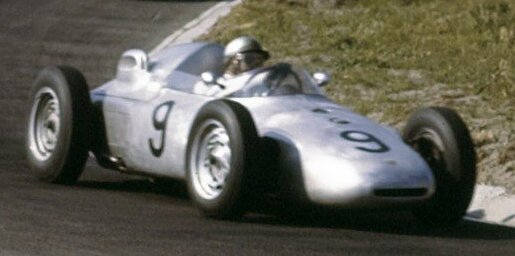
Porsche finished third in the International Cup for F1 Manufacturers with the Porsche 718/2 & 787.

The 1961 Formula One season was the 15th season of FIA Formula One motor racing. It featured the 12th World Championship of Drivers, the 4th International Cup for F1 Manufacturers, and numerous non-championship Formula One races. The World Championship was contested over eight races between 14 May and 8 October 1961.

Phil Hill driving for Ferrari won his first and only Drivers' Championship after his teammate and rival Wolfgang von Trips was killed during the Italian Grand Prix, the penultimate race of the season. Hill was the first American-born champion (and, so far, the only one, because 1978 champion Mario Andretti was born in Italy). Ferrari won its first Manufacturers' Championship.

New regulations only allowed naturally aspirated engines with a maximum capacity of 1,500 cc (92 cu in), effectively adopting the Formula Two engine rules as used from 1957 to 1960. The English teams threatened to boycott, because the change was communicated only shortly before the season started, but the protests subsided. Although Enzo Ferrari was opposed as well, the manufacturer got it right by designing their first mid-engined car, the legendary 156 "Sharknose", and won five out of the eight championship races.

Besides Wolfgang von Trips, two other F1 drivers died this year: Italian Giulio Cabianca during a test at the Aerautodromo di Modena and Briton Shane Summers during the non-championship Silver City Trophy.

== Teams and drivers ==
The following teams and drivers competed in the 1961 FIA World Championship. All teams competed with tyres supplied by Dunlop.

Entrant	Constructor	Chassis	Engine	Driver	Rounds
(West Germany) Porsche System Engineering	Porsche	787; 718/2	Porsche 547/3 1.5 F4	(Sweden) Jo Bonnier	All
(West Germany) Porsche System Engineering	Porsche	787; 718/2	Porsche 547/3 1.5 F4	(United States) Dan Gurney	All
(West Germany) Porsche System Engineering	Porsche	787; 718/2	Porsche 547/3 1.5 F4	(West Germany) Hans Herrmann	1, 6
(West Germany) Scuderia Colonia	Lotus-Climax	18	Climax FPF 1.5 L4	(Switzerland) Michael May	1, 4, 6
(West Germany) Scuderia Colonia	Lotus-Climax	18	Climax FPF 1.5 L4	(West Germany) Wolfgang Seidel	3, 5–7
(Belgium) Equipe Nationale Belge	Emeryson-Maserati	61	Maserati Tipo 6 1.5 L4	(Belgium) Olivier Gendebien	1
(Belgium) Equipe Nationale Belge	Emeryson-Maserati	61	Maserati Tipo 6 1.5 L4	(Belgium) Lucien Bianchi	1
(Belgium) Equipe Nationale Belge	Lotus-Climax	18	Climax FPF 1.5 L4	(Belgium) Lucien Bianchi	3
(Belgium) Equipe Nationale Belge	Lotus-Climax	18	Climax FPF 1.5 L4	(Belgium) Willy Mairesse	3
(Belgium) Equipe Nationale Belge	Emeryson-Climax	61	Climax FPF 1.5 L4	(Belgium) André Pilette	7
(United States) Camoradi International	Cooper-Climax	T53	Climax FPF 1.5 L4	(United States) Masten Gregory	1–5
(United States) Camoradi International	Cooper-Climax	T53	Climax FPF 1.5 L4	(United Kingdom) Ian Burgess	6
(United States) Camoradi International	Lotus-Climax	18	Climax FPF 1.5 L4	(United Kingdom) Ian Burgess	2–5
(United Kingdom) Owen Racing Organisation	BRM-Climax	P48/57	Climax FPF 1.5 L4	(United Kingdom) Tony Brooks	All
(United Kingdom) Owen Racing Organisation	BRM-Climax	P48/57	Climax FPF 1.5 L4	(United Kingdom) Graham Hill	All
(United Kingdom) R.R.C. Walker Racing Team	Lotus-Climax	18; 18/21; 21	Climax FPF 1.5 L4	(United Kingdom) Stirling Moss	All
(United Kingdom) R.R.C. Walker Racing Team	Ferguson-Climax	P99	Climax FPF 1.5 L4	(United Kingdom) Stirling Moss	5
(United Kingdom) R.R.C. Walker Racing Team	Ferguson-Climax	P99	Climax FPF 1.5 L4	(United Kingdom) Jack Fairman	5
(United Kingdom) Yeoman Credit Racing Team	Cooper-Climax	T53	Climax FPF 1.5 L4	(United Kingdom) John Surtees	All
(United Kingdom) Yeoman Credit Racing Team	Cooper-Climax	T53	Climax FPF 1.5 L4	(United Kingdom) Roy Salvadori	4–8
(United Kingdom) Cooper Car Company	Cooper-Climax	T55; T58	Climax FPF 1.5 L4; Climax FWMV 1.5 V8	(Australia) Jack Brabham	All
(United Kingdom) Cooper Car Company	Cooper-Climax	T55; T58	Climax FPF 1.5 L4; Climax FWMV 1.5 V8	(New Zealand) Bruce McLaren	All
(United Kingdom) Team Lotus	Lotus-Climax	21; 18; 18/21	Climax FPF 1.5 L4	(United Kingdom) Jim Clark	All
(United Kingdom) Team Lotus	Lotus-Climax	21; 18; 18/21	Climax FPF 1.5 L4	(United Kingdom) Innes Ireland	1, 3–8
(United Kingdom) Team Lotus	Lotus-Climax	21; 18; 18/21	Climax FPF 1.5 L4	(United Kingdom) Trevor Taylor	2
(United Kingdom) Team Lotus	Lotus-Climax	21; 18; 18/21	Climax FPF 1.5 L4	(Belgium) Willy Mairesse	4
(United Kingdom) UDT Laystall Racing Team	Lotus-Climax	18; 18/21	Climax FPF 1.5 L4	(United Kingdom) Cliff Allison	1, 3
(United Kingdom) UDT Laystall Racing Team	Lotus-Climax	18; 18/21	Climax FPF 1.5 L4	(United Kingdom) Henry Taylor	1, 3–5, 7
(United Kingdom) UDT Laystall Racing Team	Lotus-Climax	18; 18/21	Climax FPF 1.5 L4	(Belgium) Lucien Bianchi	4–5
(United Kingdom) UDT Laystall Racing Team	Lotus-Climax	18; 18/21	Climax FPF 1.5 L4	(Argentina) Juan Manuel Bordeu	4
(United Kingdom) UDT Laystall Racing Team	Lotus-Climax	18; 18/21	Climax FPF 1.5 L4	(United States) Masten Gregory	7–8
(United Kingdom) UDT Laystall Racing Team	Lotus-Climax	18; 18/21	Climax FPF 1.5 L4	(Belgium) Olivier Gendebien	8
(Italy) Scuderia Ferrari SpA SEFAC	Ferrari	156	Ferrari 178 1.5 V6; Ferrari 188 1.5 V6	(United States) Richie Ginther	1–7
(Italy) Scuderia Ferrari SpA SEFAC	Ferrari	156	Ferrari 178 1.5 V6; Ferrari 188 1.5 V6	(United States) Phil Hill	1–7
(Italy) Scuderia Ferrari SpA SEFAC	Ferrari	156	Ferrari 178 1.5 V6; Ferrari 188 1.5 V6	(West Germany) Wolfgang von Trips	1–7
(Italy) Scuderia Ferrari SpA SEFAC	Ferrari	156	Ferrari 178 1.5 V6; Ferrari 188 1.5 V6	(Belgium) Olivier Gendebien	3
(Italy) Scuderia Ferrari SpA SEFAC	Ferrari	156	Ferrari 178 1.5 V6; Ferrari 188 1.5 V6	(Belgium) Willy Mairesse	6
(Italy) Scuderia Ferrari SpA SEFAC	Ferrari	156	Ferrari 178 1.5 V6; Ferrari 188 1.5 V6	(Mexico) Ricardo Rodríguez	7
(Italy) Scuderia Serenissima	Cooper-Maserati	T51	Maserati Tipo 6 1.5 L4	(France) Maurice Trintignant	1, 3–4, 6–7
(Italy) Scuderia Serenissima	De Tomaso-OSCA	F1	OSCA 372 1.5 L4	(Italy) Giorgio Scarlatti	4
(Italy) Scuderia Serenissima	De Tomaso-Alfa Romeo	F1	Alfa Romeo Giulietta 1.5 L4	(Italy) Nino Vaccarella	7
(Netherlands) Ecurie Maarsbergen	Porsche	718	Porsche 547/3 1.5 F4	(Netherlands) Carel Godin de Beaufort	2–7
(Netherlands) Ecurie Maarsbergen	Porsche	718	Porsche 547/3 1.5 F4	(West Germany) Hans Herrmann	2
(United Kingdom) H&L Motors	Cooper-Climax	T53	Climax FPF 1.5 L4	(United Kingdom) Jackie Lewis	3–7
(United Kingdom) Tony Marsh	Lotus-Climax	18	Climax FPF 1.5 L4	(United Kingdom) Tony Marsh	3, 5–6
(Italy) Scuderia Centro Sud	Cooper-Maserati	T53; T51	Maserati Tipo 6 1.5 L4	(Italy) Lorenzo Bandini	3, 5–7
(Italy) Scuderia Centro Sud	Cooper-Maserati	T53; T51	Maserati Tipo 6 1.5 L4	(Italy) Massimo Natili	5, 7
(France) Bernard Collomb	Cooper-Climax	T53	Climax FPF 1.5 L4	(France) Bernard Collomb	4, 6
(United Kingdom) Tim Parnell	Lotus-Climax	18	Climax FPF 1.5 L4	(United Kingdom) Tim Parnell	5, 7
(United Kingdom) Gerry Ashmore	Lotus-Climax	18	Climax FPF 1.5 L4	(United Kingdom) Gerry Ashmore	5–7
(United States) Louise Bryden-Brown	Lotus-Climax	18	Climax FPF 1.5 L4	(South Africa) Tony Maggs	5–6
(United Kingdom) Gilby Engineering	Gilby-Climax	61	Climax FPF 1.5 L4	(United Kingdom) Keith Greene	5
(Italy) FISA	Ferrari	156	Ferrari 178 1.5 V6	(Italy) Giancarlo Baghetti	4
(Italy) Scuderia Sant'Ambroeus	Ferrari	156	Ferrari 178 1.5 V6	(Italy) Giancarlo Baghetti	5, 7
(United Kingdom) J.B. Naylor	JBW-Climax	59	Climax FPF 1.5 L4	(United Kingdom) Brian Naylor	7
(United Kingdom) Fred Tuck Cars	Cooper-Climax	T45	Climax FPF 1.5 L4	(United Kingdom) Jack Fairman	7
(Italy) Scuderia Settecolli	De Tomaso-OSCA	F1	OSCA 372 1.5 L4	(Italy) Roberto Lippi	7
(Italy) Isobele de Tomaso	De Tomaso-Alfa Romeo	F1	Alfa Romeo Giulietta 1.5 L4	(Italy) Roberto Bussinello	7
(Italy) Pescara Racing Team	Cooper-Maserati	T45	Maserati Tipo 6 1.5 L4	(Italy) Renato Pirocchi	7
(Italy) Gaetano Starrabba	Lotus-Maserati	18	Maserati Tipo 6 1.5 L4	(Italy) Gaetano Starrabba	7
(United States) Hap Sharp	Cooper-Climax	T53	Climax FPF 1.5 L4	(United States) Hap Sharp	8
(United States) John M. Wyatt III	Cooper-Climax	T53	Climax FPF 1.5 L4	(United States) Roger Penske	8
(Canada) J. Wheeler Autosport	Lotus-Climax	18/21	Climax FPF 1.5 L4	(Canada) Peter Ryan	8
(United States) Jim Hall	Lotus-Climax	18	Climax FPF 1.5 L4	(United States) Jim Hall	8
(United States) J. Frank Harrison	Lotus-Climax	18	Climax FPF 1.5 L4	(United States) Lloyd Ruby	8
(United States) Momo Corporation	Cooper-Climax	T53	Climax FPF 1.5 L4	(United States) Walt Hansgen	8

=== Team and driver changes ===
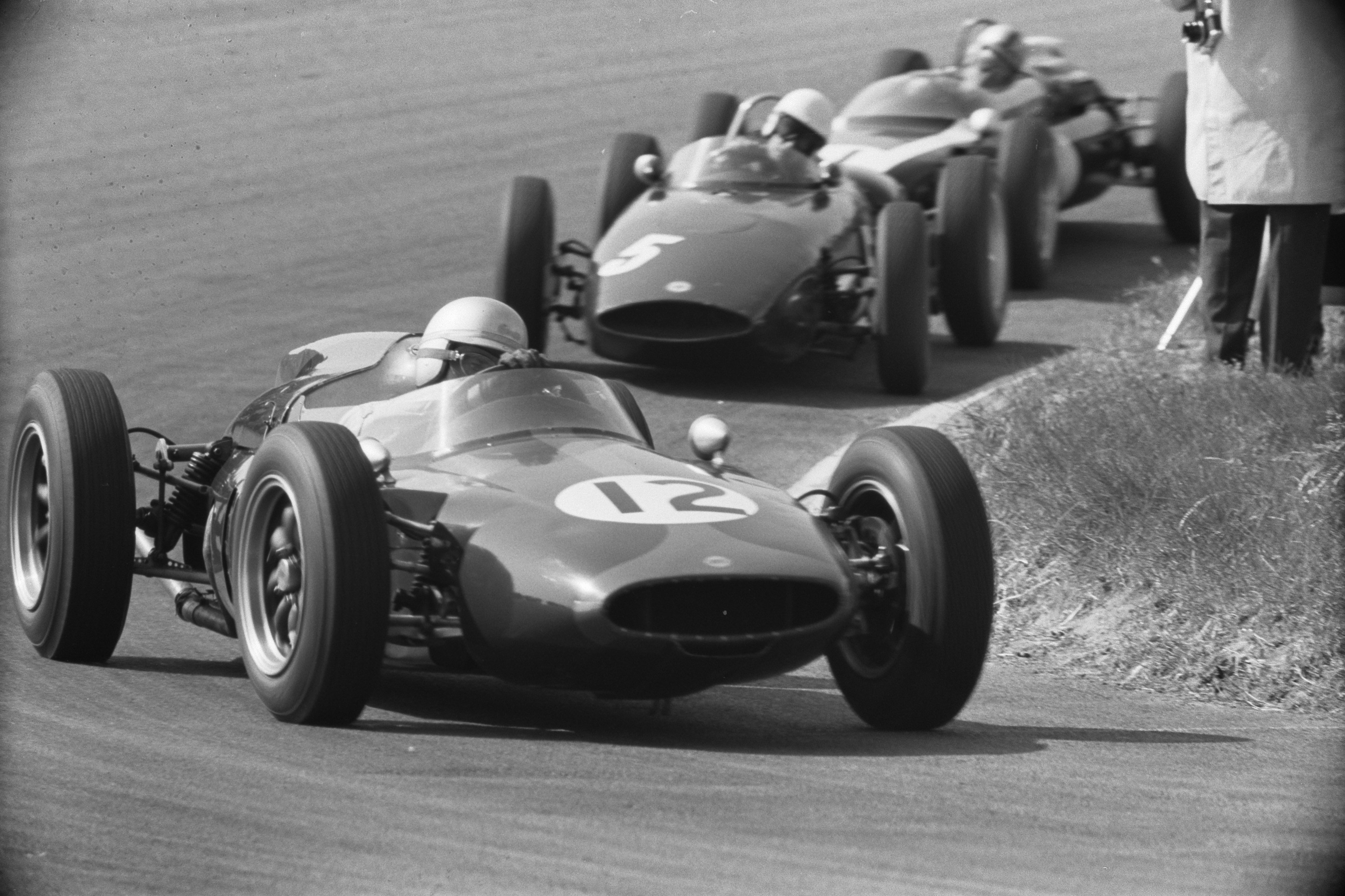
John Surtees (no. 12) replaced Tony Brooks (no. 5) at Reg Parnell Racing.

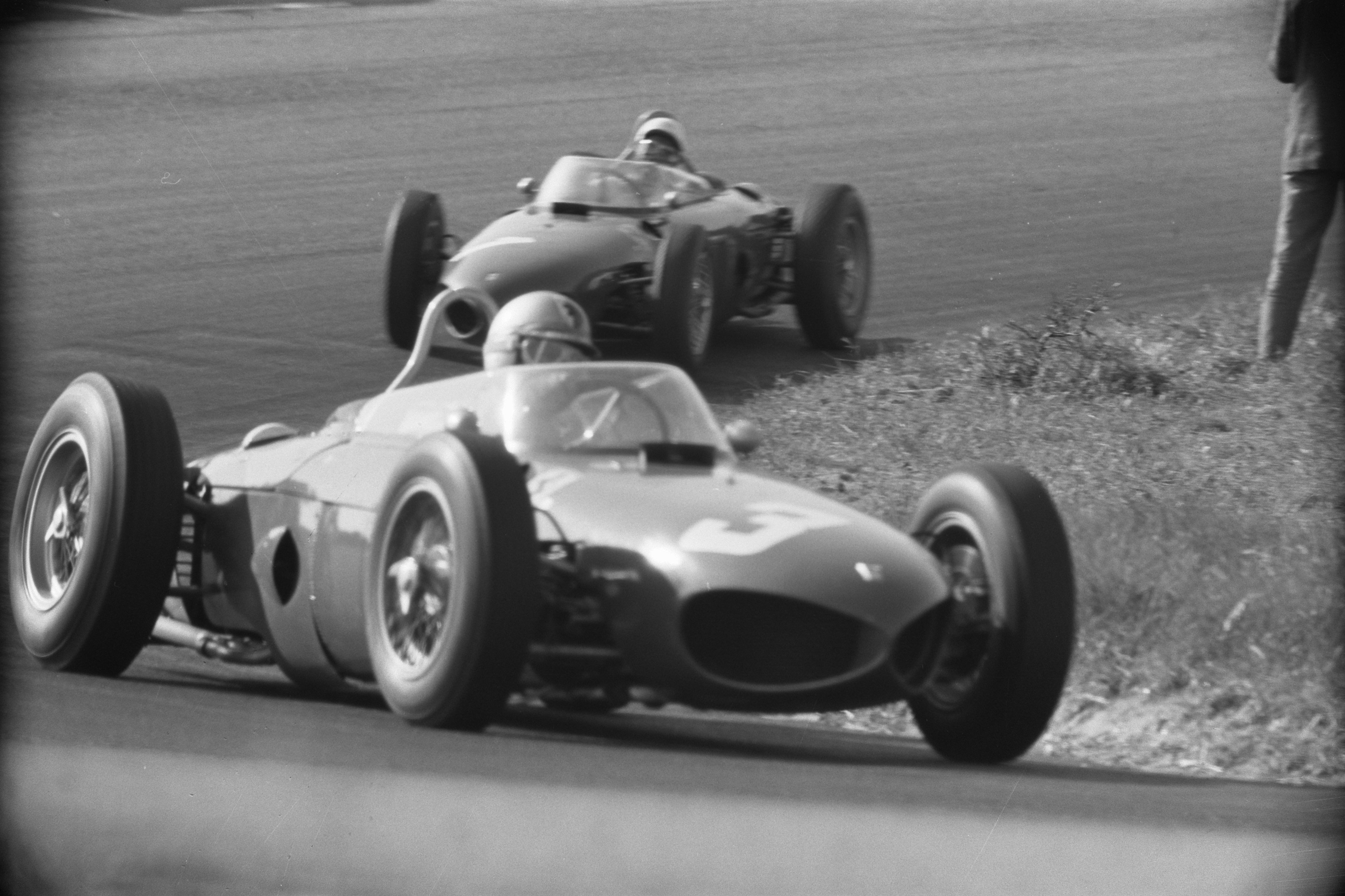
Phil Hill (no. 1) and Wolfgang von Trips (no. 3) were teammates and championship rivals. Von Trips was fatally injured in the penultimate round of the season.

- Porsche made their full-season debut, entering two cars driven by Jo Bonnier and Dan Gurney.
- Both of them had been driving for BRM, so the British signed Tony Brooks to partner future champion Graham Hill. BRM had been building their own engines in previous years but were not prepared for this year's rule changes, so they bought a Coventry Climax unit. It was the same engine as Team Lotus and Cooper were using, but results were merely reasonable.
- John Surtees moved from Lotus's works team to Reg Parnell's private entry to fill the seat of Brooks. Lotus did not replace Surtees and reduced their operations to two cars.
- Both Aston Martin and Vanwall had only competed in one race in 1960 and abandoned their F1 operations before this year.
- Maserati had withdrawn their works team after 1958, but private teams had still been using their legendary 250F chassis from 1948. From this year on, however, Maserati would only be supplying engines.

==== Mid-season changes ====
- Lotus driver Innes Ireland was badly injured in the Monaco Grand Prix, so Trevor Taylor filled in for him during the Dutch Grand Prix. Taylor would be hired instead of Ireland for the 1962 season.
- After getting injured in a crash in last year's Monaco Grand Prix, BRP driver Cliff Allison was taken to hospital again after practice for the Belgian Grand Prix. He broke both his knees and fractured his pelvis when his car careened off the course and overturned in a field. His seat was filled by Lucien Bianchi and Masten Gregory. Their teammate Henry Taylor suffered a serious accident in the British Grand Prix, after which he turned away from single-seater racing and took up rallying. He was replaced by Olivier Gendebien.
- Ferrari driver Wolfgang von Trips collided with Jim Clark during the Italian Grand Prix. His car went off the track, fatally throwing him out and killing fifteen spectators. Ferrari withdrew the team from the final race on the calendar, but still won both championships.

== Calendar ==
Round	Grand Prix	Circuit	Date
1	Monaco Grand Prix	Circuit de Monaco, Monte Carlo	14 May
2	Dutch Grand Prix	(Netherlands) Circuit Zandvoort, Zandvoort	22 May
3	Belgian Grand Prix	(Belgium) Circuit de Spa-Francorchamps, Stavelot	18 June
4	French Grand Prix	(France) Reims-Gueux, Gueux	2 July
5	British Grand Prix	(United Kingdom) Aintree Motor Racing Circuit, Merseyside	15 July
6	German Grand Prix	(West Germany) Nürburgring, Nürburg	6 August
7	Italian Grand Prix	(Italy) Autodromo Nazionale di Monza, Monza	10 September
8	United States Grand Prix	(United States) Watkins Glen International, New York	8 October

=== Calendar changes ===
- The Moroccan Grand Prix was originally scheduled to be held on 29 October as the season finale but was cancelled for the third year in a row due to monetary reasons.
- The Argentine Grand Prix was dropped from the calendar after the Argentinian fan base declined with the retirements of Juan Manuel Fangio in 1958 and José Froilán González in 1960, and the unstable government situation (since the exile of then President of Argentina Juan Peron in 1955) caused safety concerns.
- The Portuguese Grand Prix was dropped from the calendar.
- The British Grand Prix was moved from Silverstone to Aintree, in keeping with the event-sharing arrangement between the two circuits.
- The German Grand Prix returned to the Nürburgring after the 1959 round was run at the AVUS circuit and the 1960 round was run as a Formula Two race.
- Six weeks before the race, it was decided the United States Grand Prix would move from Riverside International Raceway to Watkins Glen because of the lack of spectators attending and prize money being paid by the latter's organisers.
- From this season onwards the Indianapolis 500 which had been included on the calendar since the inaugural World Championship season in 1950 but run to AAA rules was dropped from the official World Championship with the race now solely becoming a domestic American open-wheel championship event.

== Regulation changes ==
=== Technical regulations ===
Formula One effectively adopted the Formula Two engine regulations, as used from 1957 to 1960, by reducing the maximum engine capacity to 1,500 cc (92 cu in) and only allowing naturally aspirated engines. Furthermore:

- The minimum capacity was set at 1,300 cc (79 cu in).
- The minimum weight was originally set at 500 kg (1,100 lb), but later lowered to 450 kg (990 lb).
- It was banned to add lubricants (oil or water) to a car during a race;
- Wheels could not be covered by bodywork.

=== Safety regulations ===
Numerous technical innovations were made mandatory from the aspect of safety:

- Roll bars, which had to be wider than the driver's shoulders but could not extend higher or further forward than the driver's head;
- Automatic starter motors capable of being operated by the driver when seated at the steering wheel;
- An electrical master switch as fire precaution;
- A dual braking system with independent operation on the front wheels, so in case of a brake fail, the front brakes will still slow the car down;
- Seat belt attachments (although wearing the belt remained optional);
- Fuel tank fillers could not stick out of the body panels and had to be wide enough for air to escape during refueling.

=== Sporting regulations ===
The number of championship points awarded to a race winner was increased to nine.

== Championship report ==
=== Pre-season non-championship races ===
Before the 1961 Formula One season was to start in Monaco in mid-May, many non-championship races were held throughout Europe. The first was the Lombank Trophy, a joint Formula One and Intercontinental Formula race, at the fast 2.7-mile Snetterton circuit in eastern England. Most of the top drivers of the day, such as Stirling Moss, Jim Clark, Graham Hill, Phil Hill and Wolfgang von Trips were in the United States competing in the prestigious 12 Hours of Sebring sportscar race. Still, two top drivers—John Surtees and defending champion Jack Brabham—were in attendance. Brabham won the race in an Intercontinental Cooper while Surtees finished third, first of the Formula One entrants.

A week later, the Glover Trophy at the fast Goodwood circuit in southern England was held, with Surtees winning in a privately entered Cooper, ahead of Graham Hill in a works BRM, Surtees's teammate Roy Salvadori in a Cooper and Moss in a Rob Walker-entered Lotus. On the same day, the Pau Grand Prix in southwest France was won by Clark driving a works Lotus. Six days later, the Brussels Grand Prix at Heysel Park was won by Brabham in a works Cooper. Seven days after that, Moss won the Vienna Grand Prix in Austria, held at an aerodrome in Aspern, Vienna. Six days later, on a Friday, the Aintree 200 in Liverpool was won by Brabham in wet conditions, and three days later, the prestigious Syracuse Grand Prix in Sicily was won by Giancarlo Baghetti in a Ferrari – his first ever Formula One race.

=== Race 1: Monaco ===
The 1961 Formula One season did not officially start until May, eight days after the BRDC race in England. Practice saw Clark crash his Lotus heavily at turn one, and Lotus's woes continued when Innes Ireland crashed in the tunnel during the final session, destroying his car and breaking his leg. Moss took pole in his Rob Walker Lotus with Richie Ginther's Ferrari and Clark's Lotus sharing the front row. Graham and Phil Hill shared the second row. This particular Monaco Grand Prix turned out to be a classic, with one of the greatest driving performances in the history of Formula One by Stirling Moss in a privately entered Lotus against three Ferraris with a lot more power but worse handling than the Lotus.

At the start, Ginther took the lead from Clark and Moss, but Clark soon had to pit with fuel pump problems, and so Jo Bonnier and Dan Gurney took third and fourth in their Porsches. On Lap 14, both Moss and Bonnier were able to pass Ginther, and 10 laps later Phil Hill passed both Ginther and Bonnier to move into second but there was no way he was going to catch Moss, who was driving one of the greatest races of his illustrious career. Towards mid-distance Ginther fought back, passing Hill for second and chasing after Moss, closing the gap to just three seconds. Moss responded, driving on the limit the entire way and eventually won the race. Hill finished third and Wolfgang von Trips was classified fourth despite crashing on the last lap.

The 19th Naples Grand Prix in southern Italy, held on the same day as the Monaco Grand Prix, at the Posillipo Park circuit and it was won by Baghetti- who had won two Formula One races from two starts.

=== Race 2: Netherlands ===
There were just eight days between Monaco and the Dutch Grands Prix. The Dutch race was held at the Circuit Zandvoort located in small sand dunes right next to a popular beach 20 miles west of Amsterdam. The injured Innes Ireland was replaced at Team Lotus by Trevor Taylor but otherwise the field was much as it had been at Monaco, with local hero Carel Godin de Beaufort getting a drive in one of the Porsches, entered by his Ecurie Maarsbergen. Ferrari monopolised the front row of the grid with Phil Hill on pole from von Trips and Ginther, while Moss's Walker Lotus and Graham Hill's BRM shared the second row.

At the start, von Trips took the lead with Graham Hill in a works BRM and Phil Hill behind him. Graham Hill soon began to fall back, dropping quickly behind Phil Hill and Clark, who had stormed through the field from the fourth row to run fourth at the end of the first lap. Clark proceeded to battle for second place with the Ferrari and they exchanged places several times before Phil Hill finally asserted himself. Further back Graham Hill battled with Moss and Ginther, but it was von Trips who emerged ahead for most of the race, and won it. On the last lap, however, Ginther went wide when his throttle stuck open and Moss was able to grab fourth.

In the 1961 Dutch Grand Prix, every starter finished the race and no one went into the pits, which has never been achieved since.

The London Trophy was held at the short, tight and twisty Crystal Palace circuit in London the day after the Dutch Grand Prix, and it was won by Salvadori driving a Yeoman Credit Cooper, whilst another English race, the Silver City Trophy at the undulating and twisty Brands Hatch circuit nearby Crystal Palace was held in wet conditions and was won by Moss in a Walker Lotus, but was marred by the death of 24-year-old Welshman Shane Summers in a Cooper, who was killed almost instantly when he spun at the challenging, anti-cambered Paddock Hill Bend, went off and crashed into a concrete wall near an underground tunnel entrance.

=== Race 3: Belgium ===
A year after the traumatic 1960 Belgian Grand Prix, the F1 teams gathered again at the very fast and frighteningly daunting 8.7 mile Spa-Francorchamps public road circuit near Liège with a few changes from the Dutch Grand Prix three weeks previously. Innes Ireland, who had broken his leg at Monaco, was back in action for Team Lotus, which had new Lotus 21s for Ireland and Jim Clark. Ferrari had a fourth car painted up in Belgian racing yellow for Olivier Gendebien, which was being run by Ecurie Nationale Belge, which also had a pair of Emeryson chassis for Lucien Bianchi and Willy Mairesse. These were both damaged in practice and so Bianchi and Mairesse took over the non-qualified Lotus 18's with Tony Marsh and Wolfgang Seidel. British Racing Partnership was also in trouble with only one Lotus 18 to be shared by Cliff Allison and Henry Taylor. The team decided that the fastest driver would race, and as a result Allison went too fast, crashed heavily at Blanchimont, rolled the car and suffered severe leg injuries which would end his F1 career.

Phil Hill took pole with von Trips alongside while Gendebien made the most of his local experience to take third despite using a less powerful engine than the factory Ferraris. Ginther's Ferrari shared the second row with Surtees in Reg Parnell's Cooper-Climax.

Phil Hill took the lead at the start but was then passed by Gendebien while von Trips and Ginther joined in. The four Ferrari cars, well suited to this power circuit thanks to the formidable performance of their 120-degree V6 engines dominated the race and the lead changed several times before Phil Hill took the lead from von Trips and Ginther. Gendebien was fourth giving Ferrari a straight 1-2-3-4 result. Phil Hill fought von Trips all the way and the Phil Hill finished 0.7 seconds ahead of von Trips. Surtees was fifth although he had to battle early in the race with Graham Hill's BRM which eventually went out with electrical trouble. Gurney finished sixth in his Porsche.

=== Race 4: France ===
A fortnight after the Belgian GP the F1 teams gathered at the very fast, straight dominated Reims public road circuit for the French Grand Prix in Champagne country. As the French did not bother with the restrictive invitations it was a large field of cars with a variety of unusual privateers. Ferrari had a fourth car, run in the colors of the Federazione Italiana Scuderie Automobilische and driven by Baghetti who arrived at Reims undefeated. There was a new De Tomaso-Osca which was run by Scuderia Serenissima for Giorgio Scarlatti but it was not competitive. It was an all-Ferrari front row with Phil Hill on pole from Wolfgang Von Trips and Ritchie Ginther with the second row being shared by Stirling Moss in his Rob Walker Lotus 18 and Jim Clark in one of the factory Lotus 21s.

The race weekend was held in extremely hot conditions, and the track began to break up at the track's 2 hairpins. The ambient temperature on Sunday/race day was 102 °F (39 °C), and the race turned out to be yet another classic. Hill led from the start with Ginther and Von Trips giving chase but when Ginther spun Moss was able to take third for a while before the American recovered. Further back, there was an exciting slipstreaming battle between seven cars: the two Porsches of Dan Gurney and Jo Bonnier, the factory Lotuses of Clark and Ireland, Graham Hill's BRM (Tony Brooks went out early in the other car with engine trouble), Bruce McLaren's Cooper and the fourth Ferrari of Baghetti. Eventually Ginther passed Moss and he dropped back into this fight because of brake trouble. Then the Ferrari team faltered. Von Trips, who had taken the lead under team orders, stopped with engine trouble on lap 18. Hill took over but spun on lap 38 and stalled his engine, re-joining a lap behind. Ginther lasted only three laps in the lead before he stopped with an engine problem and suddenly the seething battle for fourth place was a fight for the lead. Gradually the challengers dropped away leaving Gurney's Porsche against Baghetti's Ferrari. They changed places lap after lap and on the final lap Baghetti dived out of Gurney's slipstream to pass the American a couple of hundred yards before the finish line. Baghetti thus became the first and, to date, only man to win his first World Championship event.

=== Race 5: Britain ===
Thirteen days later the British Grand Prix was held at the Aintree circuit in Liverpool, site of England's Grand National horse race. The field at Aintree was not very different from that which had been seen at Reims, although Rob Walker ran a four-wheel-drive Ferguson for Jack Fairman, although this was also driven by Stirling Moss during practice. There were four Ferraris again, with the unbeaten Giancarlo Baghetti joining the works trio. Qualifying saw Phil Hill, Ritchie Ginther, Jo Bonnier (Porsche) and Wolfgang Von Trips all set identical lap times, while Moss was alongside Von Trips on the second row in his Walker Lotus 18.

The race began in heavy rain with Phil Hill, Von Trips and Ginther getting ahead at the start, chased by Moss and Bonnier. Von Trips took the lead after seven laps, passing Hill. Moss moved to third when Ginther ran wide at one point and then managed to get past Hill for second. He chased Von Trips but was never able to pass him. When the rain stopped Moss began to drop back and would retire with brake problems. This allowed the Ferraris to finish 1-2-3 with Von Trips winning over Hill and Ginther. Jack Brabham, Bonnier and Roy Salvadori (Reg Parnell Cooper) completed the top six. The unbeaten Baghetti crashed out early in the race. Moss took over Fairman's Ferguson after he had retired but was eventually called into the pits and disqualified for having received a push-start.

The Solitude Grand Prix in Germany was held a week after the British Grand Prix on the very demanding and dangerous seven mile Solitude circuit near Porsche and Mercedes-Benz's hometown of Stuttgart. This race was won by Briton Innes Ireland in a works Lotus.

=== Race 6: Germany ===
The German Grand Prix, held at the fearsome, twisty, very dangerous and extremely challenging 14.2 mile Nürburgring circuit for the first time since 1958 featured a huge field of cars with Ferrari turning up with four cars, Wolfgang Von Trips, Phil Hill and Ritchie Ginther being joined by Willy Mairesse, although the Belgian had an older engine in his car. Jack Brabham had the new Climax V8 FWMV engine for the first time in his factory Cooper, while Porsche had four cars, Edgar Barth joining Jo Bonnier, Dan Gurney and Hans Herrmann. Qualifying saw Hill record a remarkable lap of 8:55.2 – the first time anyone had lapped the Nordschleife in under nine minutes. This time which was nearly six seconds faster than Brabham's best, with Moss third quickest in his Rob Walker Lotus 18. Bonnier completed the front row in his Porsche. The second row featured Von Trips, Graham Hill in his BRM and Gurney.

The race started in damp conditions and Brabham led the field away only to spin out and crash on that first lap. Phil Hill charged up and took the lead, but Moss passed the American before they reached the finish line to start the second lap. Moss would stay ahead for the rest of the race while Von Trips came up and overtook Hill for second after a long battle. Towards the end of the race it started to rain, but Moss never took off his intermediate tires, and this allowed Moss to extend his lead, and won a superb victory with a Lotus that had superior handling to the Ferrari – essential at the Nürburgring.

There was a three-week break between the German Grand Prix and the Swedish Kanonloppet, a non-championship race near Stockholm, and a week after that, the Danish Grand Prix at Roskilde near Copenhagen and a week after that the Modena Grand Prix near Ferrari's headquarters was held and all three of these races were won by Moss in the Walker Lotus.

=== Race 7: Italy ===
The penultimate race of the 1961 World Championship was to be a showdown between two Ferrari drivers. The team had already won the Constructors' title so it was a straight fight between Wolfgang Von Trips and Phil Hill for the Drivers' title although Moss still had a mathematical chance of victory if he won both races. The advantage lay with Wolfgang Von Trips who had 33 points to Phil Hill's 29. The Ferrari team had a new recruit at the Monza Autodrome near Milan, 19-year old Mexican Ricardo Rodriguez taking over the team's fourth car while Giancarlo Baghetti re-appeared in a private Ferrari. Once again Jack Brabham was the only driver with the new Climax V8 engine. Stirling Moss ran his usual Lotus 18 but was not happy with it and Innes Ireland let him have his factory Lotus 21. The organisers, wanting to give the advantage to the Ferrari team decided to use the combined oval/road course again making this Monza the fastest circuit of the year. This circuit had been boycotted by the British teams last year because of the terrible quality of the extremely rough and bumpy concrete banking, which was of such poor quality and design that it even went as far as to badly affect the structural strength and reliability of the cars, particularly in regards to the cars' chassis and suspension but the British teams relented and they all competed in this year's event. As expected the powerful Ferraris were impressive, Von Trips was on pole with Rodriguez second (becoming the youngest driver ever to start a World Championship Grand Prix) ahead of Ginther and Phil Hill with Graham Hill's BRM sharing the third row with Baghetti.

This Italian Grand Prix was to be marred by one of the worst tragedies in the history of motor racing, and would cast a shadow over the Italian Grand Prix for years. At the start, Phil Hill and Ginther managed to get into first and second places followed by Rodriguez, the fast-starting Jim Clark and Von Trips. Approaching the Parabolica the two cars collided. Clark crashed without injury but the Ferrari went through a spectator fence, went up an embankment on the left and was tossed into a roll, into where spectators were standing. Von Trips was thrown from the car, landed on the track, broke his neck and was killed along with 14 spectators. The race organisers decided not to stop the race and the Ferrari team put on a display until Rodriguez, Baghetti and Ginther all stopped with mechanical trouble. This left Phil Hill to win. Of the rest, Brabham went out with engine trouble while Surtees retired after running to the back of Bonnier who had slowed his Porsche at the site of Von Trips's accident. Moss went out with a broken wheel which left Dan Gurney second for Porsche and Bruce McLaren third for Cooper. Jack Lewis drove a marvellous race in his private Cooper to finish fourth ahead of Tony Brooks (BRM) and Roy Salvadori (Parnell Cooper). Von Trips's fatal retirement meant that Phil Hill became the first American to win the Formula 1 World Championship.

=== Race 8: United States ===
The only non-European championship race of 1961 was the United States GP, which was being held at the 2.3 mile Watkins Glen circuit in upstate New York for the first time 4 weeks after the tragic Italian race. Having won both World Championships Ferrari decided not to bother crossing the Atlantic, denying Phil Hill the chance to race at the Glen. Not counting the famous Indianapolis 500, run to totally different regulations and not included again on the Grand Prix calendar from 1961 onwards, this was the 3rd time the US GP had been held since the international championship started in 1950, with one off-spells at Sebring in Florida and Riverside in southern California failing to achieve any success. Watkins Glen would continuously host the US GP up until 1980.

Both Jack Brabham and Stirling Moss had the new Climax V8 engine on this occasion but Moss decided after practice not to race it. The field was joined by a number of local stars, notably Hap Sharp and Roger Penske in Coopers and Jim Hall and Ken Miles in Lotuses. Brabham took pole position with Graham Hill alongside while Moss shared the second row with Bruce McLaren in the second factory Cooper.

A paid crowd of 28,000 (total around 60,000) on Sunday made the sponsors extremely happy and also boded well for the race's future. At the start, Brabham led the field off the grid and into the first corner, but before the end of the first lap, Moss had moved by into the lead. These two were followed by Ireland (up from eighth), Hill, Dan Gurney, Masten Gregory and McLaren. On lap three, McLaren moved up to third when Ireland spun on oil at the end of the straight. "I nearly went out of the race," he said. "I went into a whirl, a 360-degree spin, cars were whipping past." He recovered and continued in eleventh.

By lap 10, Ireland had already stormed his way back to fourth, behind McLaren's Cooper, as Moss and Brabham continued to draw away at a second a lap, swapping the lead back and forth. At about one-third distance, on lap 34, Brabham's V8 began to leak water and overheat. With puffs of smoke appearing from the left-side exhaust, the Cooper dropped back from Moss and finally entered the pits on lap 45. After taking on water and returning to the race, Brabham completed only seven more laps before retiring.

Leading now by over 40 seconds, Moss seemed on his way to a comfortable victory. Only he knew, however, that his oil pressure was dropping, and on lap 59, the dark blue Lotus peeled off and retired suddenly, handing the lead to Ireland. Hill was right on the tail of the Scot, hounding him for 15 laps, until he, too, suddenly coasted down the pit lane with a loose magneto wire. The next challenger was Roy Salvadori, who began trimming the lead from 20 seconds down to five with only five laps left. But it was Ireland's day. With just over three laps remaining, Salvadori's privately entered Cooper blew its engine, just as his teammate John Surtees' car had done on the first lap.

Ireland came home under the waving chequered flag of Tex Hopkins, less than five seconds ahead of American Dan Gurney, as Britain's Tony Brooks finished the last GP of his career in third. It was a race of milestones: Innes Ireland's only career win, the first win for Team Lotus, and the first American Grand Prix to turn a profit, ensuring its return in 1962. Unfortunately for Stirling Moss, it would be his last World Championship race, as his career was ended by a heavy accident during the 1962 Glover Trophy race at Goodwood the following April.

== Results and standings ==
=== Grands Prix ===
Round	Grand Prix	Pole position	Fastest lap	Winning driver	Winning constructor	Tyre	Report
1	Monaco Grand Prix	(United Kingdom) Stirling Moss	(United States) Richie Ginther (United Kingdom) Stirling Moss	(United Kingdom) Stirling Moss	(United Kingdom) Lotus-Climax	D	Report
2	(Netherlands) Dutch Grand Prix	(United States) Phil Hill	(United Kingdom) Jim Clark	(West Germany) Wolfgang von Trips	(Italy) Ferrari	D	Report
3	(Belgium) Belgian Grand Prix	(United States) Phil Hill	(United States) Richie Ginther	(United States) Phil Hill	(Italy) Ferrari	D	Report
4	(France) French Grand Prix	(United States) Phil Hill	(United States) Phil Hill	(Italy) Giancarlo Baghetti	(Italy) Ferrari	D	Report
5	(United Kingdom) British Grand Prix	(United States) Phil Hill	(United Kingdom) Tony Brooks	(West Germany) Wolfgang von Trips	(Italy) Ferrari	D	Report
6	(West Germany) German Grand Prix	(United States) Phil Hill	(United States) Phil Hill	(United Kingdom) Stirling Moss	(United Kingdom) Lotus-Climax	D	Report
7	(Italy) Italian Grand Prix	(West Germany) Wolfgang von Trips	(Italy) Giancarlo Baghetti	(United States) Phil Hill	(Italy) Ferrari	D	Report
8	United States Grand Prix	(Australia) Jack Brabham	(Australia) Jack Brabham	(United Kingdom) Innes Ireland	(United Kingdom) Lotus-Climax	D	Report

=== Scoring system ===
Points were awarded to the top six classified finishers. Only the best five results counted towards the championship.

The International Cup for F1 Manufacturers only counted the points of the highest-finishing driver for each race. Like the Drivers' Championship, only the best five results counted towards the cup. The points system for the Drivers' Championship was adjusted for the season to award 9 points for a win. The International Cup for F1 Manufacturers remained unchanged, however, at 8 points for a win.

Numbers without parentheses are championship points; numbers in parentheses are total points scored. Points were awarded in the following system:

Position	1st	2nd	3rd	4th	5th	6th
Drivers' Championship points	9	6	4	3	2	1
International Cup for F1 Manufacturers points	8	6	4	3	2	1

=== World Drivers' Championship standings ===
Pos.	Driver	MON (Monaco)	NED (Netherlands)	BEL (Belgium)	FRA (France)	GBR (United Kingdom)	GER (West Germany)	ITA (Italy)	USA (United States)	Pts.
1	(United States) Phil Hill	3	2^{P}	1^{P}	9^{P}^{F}	2^{P}	(3^{P}^{F})	1		34 (38)
2	(West Germany) Wolfgang von Trips	4	1	2	Ret	1	2	Ret^{P}		33
3	(United Kingdom) Stirling Moss	1^{P}^{F}	4	8	Ret	DSQ† / Ret	1	Ret	Ret	21
4	(United States) Dan Gurney	5	10	6	2	7	7	2	2	21
5	(United States) Richie Ginther	2^{F}	5	3^{F}	15	3	8	Ret		16
6	(United Kingdom) Innes Ireland	DNS		Ret	4	10	Ret	Ret	1	12
7	(United Kingdom) Jim Clark	10	3^{F}	12	3	Ret	4	Ret	7	11
8	(New Zealand) Bruce McLaren	6	12	Ret	5	8	6	3	4	11
9	(Italy) Giancarlo Baghetti				1	Ret		Ret^{F}		9
10	(United Kingdom) Tony Brooks	13	9	13	Ret	9^{F}	Ret	5	3	6
11	(Australia) Jack Brabham	Ret	6	Ret	Ret	4	Ret	Ret	Ret^{P}^{F}	4
12	(United Kingdom) John Surtees	11	7	5	Ret	Ret	5	Ret	Ret	4
13	(Belgium) Olivier Gendebien	DNQ		4					11	3
14	(United Kingdom) Jackie Lewis			9	Ret	Ret	9	4		3
15	(Sweden) Jo Bonnier	12	11	7	7	5	Ret	Ret	6	3
16	(United Kingdom) Graham Hill	Ret	8	Ret	6	Ret	Ret	Ret	5	3
17	(United Kingdom) Roy Salvadori				8	6	10	6	Ret	2
—	(France) Maurice Trintignant	7		Ret	13		Ret	9		0
—	(Netherlands) Carel Godin de Beaufort		14	11	Ret	16	14	7		0
—	(Italy) Lorenzo Bandini			Ret		12	Ret	8		0
—	(United Kingdom) Cliff Allison	8		DNS						0
—	(United States) Roger Penske								8	0
—	(West Germany) Hans Herrmann	9	15				13			0
—	(Canada) Peter Ryan								9	0
—	(United States) Masten Gregory	DNQ	DNS	10	12	11		Ret	Ret	0
—	(United Kingdom) Henry Taylor	DNQ		DNS	10	Ret		11		0
—	(United Kingdom) Tim Parnell					Ret		10		0
—	(United States) Hap Sharp								10	0
—	(South Africa) Tony Maggs					13	11			0
—	(Switzerland) Michael May	Ret			11		DNS			0
—	(United Kingdom) Ian Burgess		DNS	DNS	14	14	12			0
—	(Italy) Renato Pirocchi							12		0
—	(United Kingdom) Trevor Taylor		13							0
—	(United Kingdom) Tony Marsh			DNS		Ret	15			0
—	(United Kingdom) Keith Greene					15				0
—	(United Kingdom) Gerry Ashmore					Ret	16	Ret		0
—	(West Germany) Wolfgang Seidel			DNS		17	Ret	Ret		0
—	(France) Bernard Collomb				Ret		NC			0
—	(Belgium) Lucien Bianchi	DNQ		Ret	Ret	Ret				0
—	(Belgium) Willy Mairesse			Ret	Ret		Ret			0
—	(United Kingdom) Jack Fairman					DSQ†		Ret		0
—	(Italy) Giorgio Scarlatti				Ret					0
—	(Italy) Massimo Natili					Ret				0
—	(Mexico) Ricardo Rodríguez							Ret		0
—	(Italy) Gaetano Starrabba							Ret		0
—	(Italy) Nino Vaccarella							Ret		0
—	(Italy) Roberto Bussinello							Ret		0
—	(United Kingdom) Brian Naylor							Ret		0
—	(Italy) Roberto Lippi							Ret		0
—	(United States) Jim Hall								Ret	0
—	(United States) Lloyd Ruby								Ret	0
—	(United States) Walt Hansgen								Ret	0
—	(Belgium) André Pilette							DNQ		0
Pos.	Driver	MON (Monaco)	NED (Netherlands)	BEL (Belgium)	FRA (France)	GBR (United Kingdom)	GER (West Germany)	ITA (Italy)	USA (United States)	Pts

Key
Colour	Result
Gold	Winner
Silver	Second place
Bronze	Third place
Green	Other points position
Blue	Other classified position
Blue	Not classified, finished (NC)
Purple	Not classified, retired (Ret)
Red	Did not qualify (DNQ)
Black	Disqualified (DSQ)
White	Did not start (DNS)
White	Race cancelled (C)
Blank	Did not practice (DNP)
Blank	Excluded (EX)
Blank	Did not arrive (DNA)
Blank	Withdrawn (WD)
Blank	Did not enter (empty cell)
Annotation	Meaning
P	Pole position
F	Fastest lap

- Only the best five results counted towards the championship. Numbers without parentheses are championship points; numbers in parentheses are total points scored.
- ^{F} indicates fastest lap
- ^{P} indicates pole position
- † Position shared between multiple drivers of the same car.

=== International Cup for F1 Manufacturers standings ===
Pos.	Manufacturer	MON (Monaco)	NED (Netherlands)	BEL (Belgium)	FRA (France)	GBR (United Kingdom)	GER (West Germany)	ITA (Italy)	USA (United States)	Pts.
1	(Italy) Ferrari	(2)	1	1	1	1	(2)	1	WD	40 (52)
2	(United Kingdom) Lotus-Climax	1	3	8	3	10	1	10	1	32
3	(West Germany) Porsche	5	10	(6)	2	5	7	2	2	22 (23)
4	(United Kingdom) Cooper-Climax	(6)	(6)	5	5	4	(5)	3	4	14 (18)
5	(United Kingdom) BRM-Climax	13	8	13	6	9	Ret	5	3	7
—	(United Kingdom) Cooper-Maserati	7		Ret	13	12	Ret	8		0
—	(United Kingdom) Gilby-Climax					15				0
—	(United Kingdom) Ferguson-Climax					DSQ				0
—	(Italy) De Tomaso-OSCA				Ret			Ret		0
—	(United Kingdom) Lotus-Maserati							Ret		0
—	(Italy) De Tomaso-Alfa Romeo						WD	Ret		0
—	(United Kingdom) JBW-Climax				WD			Ret		0
—	(United Kingdom) Emeryson-Maserati	DNQ				WD				0
—	(United Kingdom) Emeryson-Climax							DNQ		0
Pos.	Manufacturer	MON (Monaco)	NED (Netherlands)	BEL (Belgium)	FRA (France)	GBR (United Kingdom)	GER (West Germany)	ITA (Italy)	USA (United States)	Pts

- Only the best five results counted towards the championship. Numbers without parentheses are championship points; numbers in parentheses are total points scored.
- Bold results counted to championship totals.

== Non-championship races ==
Other Formula One races also held in 1961, which did not count towards the World Championship.

A pink background indicates an Intercontinental Formula race. A blue background indicates a combined Formula One and Intercontinental Formula race.

Race Name	Circuit	Date	Winning driver	Constructor	Report
(United Kingdom) II Lombank Trophy	Snetterton	26 March	(Australia) Jack Brabham	(United Kingdom) Cooper-Climax	Report
(United Kingdom) IX Glover Trophy	Goodwood	3 April	(United Kingdom) John Surtees	(United Kingdom) Cooper-Climax	Report
(France) XXI Pau Grand Prix	Pau	3 April	(United Kingdom) Jim Clark	(United Kingdom) Lotus-Climax	Report
(United Kingdom) XIII Lavant Cup	Goodwood	3 April	(United Kingdom) Stirling Moss	(United Kingdom) Cooper-Climax	Report
(Belgium) III Brussels Grand Prix	Heysel	9 April	(Australia) Jack Brabham	(United Kingdom) Cooper-Climax	Report
(Austria) II Vienna Grand Prix	Aspern Aerodrome	16 April	(United Kingdom) Stirling Moss	(United Kingdom) Lotus-Climax	Report
(United Kingdom) VI Aintree 200	Aintree	22 April	(Australia) Jack Brabham	(United Kingdom) Cooper-Climax	Report
(Italy) XI Syracuse Grand Prix	Syracuse	25 April	(Italy) Giancarlo Baghetti	(Italy) Ferrari	Report
(United Kingdom) XIII BRDC International Trophy	Silverstone	6 May	(United Kingdom) Stirling Moss	(United Kingdom) Cooper-Climax	Report
(Italy) XIX Naples Grand Prix	Posillipo	14 May	(Italy) Giancarlo Baghetti	(Italy) Ferrari	Report
(United Kingdom) IX London Trophy	Crystal Palace	22 May	(United Kingdom) Roy Salvadori	(United Kingdom) Cooper-Climax	Report
(United Kingdom) VI Silver City Trophy	Brands Hatch	3 June	(United Kingdom) Stirling Moss	(United Kingdom) Lotus-Climax	Report
(United Kingdom) XXIII British Empire Trophy	Silverstone	8 July	(United Kingdom) Stirling Moss	(United Kingdom) Cooper-Climax	Report
(Republic of Ireland) Irish Shell-BP Trophy	Phoenix Park	22 July	(United Kingdom) Gerry Ashmore	(United Kingdom) Lotus-Climax	Report
(West Germany) Solitude Grand Prix	Solitudering	23 July	(United Kingdom) Innes Ireland	(United Kingdom) Lotus-Climax	Report
(United Kingdom) Guards Trophy	Brands Hatch	7 August	(Australia) Jack Brabham	(United Kingdom) Cooper-Climax	Report
(Sweden) VII Kanonloppet	Karlskoga	20 August	(United Kingdom) Stirling Moss	(United Kingdom) Lotus-Climax	Report
(Denmark) II Danish Grand Prix	Roskilde Ring	26–27 August	(United Kingdom) Stirling Moss	(United Kingdom) Lotus-Climax	Report
(Italy) XV Modena Grand Prix	Modena	3 September	(United Kingdom) Stirling Moss	(United Kingdom) Lotus-Climax	Report
(Austria) III Flugplatzrennen	Zeltweg Airfield	17 September	(United Kingdom) Innes Ireland	(United Kingdom) Lotus-Climax	Report
(United Kingdom) VIII Gold Cup	Oulton Park	23 September	(United Kingdom) Stirling Moss	(United Kingdom) Ferguson-Climax	Report
(United Kingdom) V Lewis-Evans Trophy	Brands Hatch	1 October	(United Kingdom) Tony Marsh	(United Kingdom) BRM-Climax	Report
(Italy) I Coppa Italia	Vallelunga	12 October	(Italy) Giancarlo Baghetti	(West Germany) Porsche	Report
(South Africa) V Rand Grand Prix	Kyalami	9 December	(United Kingdom) Jim Clark	(United Kingdom) Lotus-Climax	Report
(South Africa) I Natal Grand Prix	Westmead	17 December	(United Kingdom) Jim Clark	(United Kingdom) Lotus-Climax	Report
(South Africa) VIII South African Grand Prix	East London	26 December	(United Kingdom) Jim Clark	(United Kingdom) Lotus-Climax	Report
