= 1961 Coppa Italia =

- Non-championship race in the 1961 Formula One season

Race details
- Date: 12 October 1961
- Official name: I Coppa Italia
- Location: ACI Vallelunga Circuit
- Course: Permanent racing facility
- Course length: 1.77 km (1.1 miles)
- Distance: 30 x 2 laps, 106.378 km (66.1 miles)

Pole position
Driver	(Italy) Nino Vaccarella	Cooper-Maserati
- Time: 59.1

Fastest lap
Driver	(Italy) Nino Vaccarella	Cooper-Maserati
- Time: 58.1

Podium
First	(Italy) Giancarlo Baghetti	Porsche
Second	(Italy) Ernesto Prinoth	Lotus-Climax
Third	(Italy) Nino Vaccarella	Cooper-Maserati

The 1st Coppa Italia was a motor race, run to Formula One rules, held on 12 October 1961 at Vallelunga Circuit. The race was run over two heats of 30 laps of the circuit, and was won by Italian driver Giancarlo Baghetti in a Porsche 718.

After the Italian Drivers' Championship finished as a tie between Giancarlo Baghetti and Lorenzo Bandini, a deciding race was organised. However, the fairness of this idea is in question since it was well known that Bandini would not be available to take part. Baghetti's team, Scuderia Sant Ambroeus, borrowed the Porsche from Ecurie Nationale Suisse, and their driver won both heats to take the national title.

== Results ==
Pos	Driver	Entrant	Constructor	Time/Retired	Grid	Heat 1/2
1	(Italy) Giancarlo Baghetti	Scuderia Sant Ambroeus	Porsche	1.00:53.9	2	1st / 1st
2	(Italy) Ernesto Prinoth	Scuderia Dolomiti	Lotus-Climax	+ 15.3 s	3	2nd / 2nd
3	(Italy) Nino Vaccarella	Scuderia Serenissima	Cooper-Maserati	59 laps	1	3rd / 3rd
4	(Italy) Roberto Bussinello	Isobele de Tomaso	De Tomaso-Alfa Romeo	58 laps	4	5th / 4th
5	(Italy) Roberto Lippi	Scuderia Settecolli	De Tomaso-O.S.C.A.	58 laps	6	4th / 5th
6	(Italy) Albino Buticchi	Scuderi Sant Ambroeus	Cooper-Climax	57 laps	8	6th / 6th
7	(Italy) Lucien de Sanctis	Scuderi Sant Ambroeus	Cooper-Climax	56 laps	9	7th / 7th
8	(Italy) Gaetano Starrabba	Gaetano Starrabba	Lotus-Maserati	31 laps	5	8th / 8th
9	(Italy) Elio Pandolfo	Scuderia Montegrappa	Elios	22 laps	10	9th / Ret
Ret	(Italy) Rovero Campello	Rovero Campello	de Sanctis-Fiat	Engine	7	Ret / DNS
WD	(Italy) Ludovico Scarfiotti	Pescara Racing Club	De Tomaso-O.S.C.A.	Car not ready	–	– / –
WD	(Italy) Menato Boffa	Menato Boffa	Cooper-Climax	Car not ready	–	– / –

Previous race: 1961 Lewis-Evans Trophy	Formula One non-championship races 1961 season	Next race: 1961 Rand Grand Prix
Previous race: —	Coppa Italia	Next race: —
