= 1961 Brussels Grand Prix =

- Non-championship race in the 1961 Formula One season

Race details
- Date: 9 April 1961
- Official name: III Grand Prix de Bruxelles
- Location: Heysel Park, Belgium
- Course: Street Circuit
- Course length: 4.553 km (2.829 miles)
- Distance: 22 (x3) laps, 300.454 km (186.693 miles)

Fastest lap
Driver	(United Kingdom) Stirling Moss	Lotus-Climax
- Time: 2:04.7

Podium
First	(Australia) Jack Brabham	Cooper-Climax
Second	(New Zealand) Bruce McLaren	Cooper-Climax
Third	(United Kingdom) Tony Marsh	Lotus-Climax

The 1961 Brussels Grand Prix was a motor race set to Formula One rules, held on 9 April 1961 at Heysel Park, Belgium. The race was run in three "heats" of 22 laps each and the times were aggregated. The race was won by Australian driver Jack Brabham in a Cooper T53.

== Results ==
Pos	No	Driver	Constructor	Laps	Time/Retired	Heat 1 / 2 / 3
1	2	(Australia) Jack Brabham	Cooper-Climax	66	2:19'21.8	3rd / 1st / 1st
2	4	(New Zealand) Bruce McLaren	Cooper-Climax	66	+1'06.8	4th / 2nd / 3rd
3	26	(United Kingdom) Tony Marsh	Lotus-Climax	66	+3'08.23	5th / 3rd / 4th
4	36	(Belgium) Lucien Bianchi	Emeryson-Maserati	65	+1 Lap	8th / 5th / 5th
5	14	(United Kingdom) Cliff Allison	Lotus-Climax	64	+2 Laps	7th / 6th / 6th
6	12	(United Kingdom) Ian Burgess	Lotus-Climax	61	+5 Laps	11th / 7th / 7th
7	18	(United Kingdom) Stirling Moss	Lotus-Climax	58	+8 Laps	14th / 8th / 2nd
8	38	(Belgium) Willy Mairesse	Emeryson-Climax	56	+10 Laps	13th / 9th / 8th
9	20	(United Kingdom) Innes Ireland	Lotus-Climax	45	+21 Laps	6th / 4th / Ret
10	44	(United Kingdom) John Campbell-Jones	Cooper-Climax	38	+28 Laps	19th / 10th / Ret
Ret	8	(United Kingdom) Roy Salvadori	Cooper-Climax	33	Engine	2nd / Ret / -
Ret	30	(Sweden) Jo Bonnier	Porsche	32	Accident	1st / Ret / -
Ret	6	(United Kingdom) John Surtees	Cooper-Climax	28	Accident	10th / Ret /-
Ret	34	(Belgium) Olivier Gendebien	Emeryson-Maserati	25	Accident	12th / Ret / -
Ret	16	(United Kingdom) Henry Taylor	Lotus-Climax	17	Wishbone	Ret / - / -
Ret	24	(Belgium) André Pilette	Lotus-Climax	11	Gear selector	Ret / - / -
Ret	28	(Germany) Wolfgang Seidel	Lotus-Climax	6	Engine	Ret / - / -
Ret	32	(United States) Dan Gurney	Porsche	2	Gear linkage	Ret / - / -
Ret	22	(United Kingdom) Jim Clark	Lotus-Climax	2	Gearbox	Ret / - / -
DNS	10	(France) Maurice Trintignant	Lotus-Climax	0	Crown wheel and pinion	Ret / - / -
DNQ	42	(France) Jo Schlesser	Cooper-Climax	0	Excluded	-
DNQ	46	(United Kingdom) Shane Summers	Cooper-Climax	0	Excluded	-
DNQ	48	(United Kingdom) Jackie Lewis	Cooper-Climax	0	Excluded	-

== Notes ==
- Maurice Trintignant had previously entered as the No. 40 Cooper-Climax car, but withdrew.
- Wolfgang von Trips and Mauro Bianchi had also entered, but did not participate.
- Jo Schlesser made his debut in this race.
- Although performing extremely well in the practice and qualifying sessions, Jack Lewis was not admitted to the race, since he had failed to be on the Belgian organizers' list of fame.
- Equipe Nationale Belge had entered two modified Emeryson chassis fitted with the heavy Maserati engine for Olivier Gendebien and Lucien Bianchi, and a standard one with the Coventry Climax engine, for Willy Mairesse.

Previous race: 1961 Lavant Cup	Formula One non-championship races 1961 season	Next race: 1961 Vienna Grand Prix
Previous race: None	Brussels Grand Prix	Next race: 1962 Brussels Grand Prix
