= 1961 Silver City Trophy =

- Non-championship race in the 1961 Formula One season

Race details
- Date: 3 June 1961
- Official name: Silver City Trophy
- Location: Brands Hatch
- Course: Permanent racing facility
- Course length: 4.265 km (2.65 miles)
- Distance: 76 laps, 311.345 km (201.4 miles)

Pole position
Driver	(United Kingdom) Stirling Moss	Lotus-Climax
- Time: 1:42.8

Fastest lap
Driver	(United Kingdom) Stirling Moss	Lotus-Climax
- Time: 1:42.0

Podium
First	(United Kingdom) Stirling Moss	Lotus-Climax
Second	(United Kingdom) Jim Clark	Lotus-Climax
Third	(United Kingdom) Tony Brooks	BRM-Climax

The sixth Silver City Trophy was a motor race, run to Formula One rules, held on 3 June 1961 at Brands Hatch Circuit. The race was run over 76 laps of the circuit, and was won by British driver Stirling Moss in a Lotus 18/21.

The race was overshadowed by a fatal accident during qualifying when Shane Summers crashed his Cooper T53 into the concrete entrance to the paddock road tunnel.

== Results ==
Pos	Driver	Entrant	Constructor	Time/Retired	Grid
1	(United Kingdom) Stirling Moss	UDT-Laystall Racing Team	Lotus-Climax	2.11:40.6	1
2	(United Kingdom) Jim Clark	Team Lotus	Lotus-Climax	+ 10.0 s	3
3	(United Kingdom) Tony Brooks	Owen Racing Organisation	BRM-Climax	+ 1:27.8 s	5
4	(United Kingdom) Roy Salvadori	Yeoman Credit Racing Team	Cooper-Climax	75 laps	6
5	(United States) Dan Gurney	Louise Bryden-Brown	Lotus-Climax	74 laps	12
6	(United Kingdom) Tony Marsh	Tony Marsh	Lotus-Climax	71 laps	13
7	(United Kingdom) Tim Parnell	Tim Parnell	Lotus-Climax	71 laps	19
8	(United Kingdom) Henry Taylor	UDT-Laystall Racing Team	Lotus-Climax	69 laps	10
9	(United Kingdom) Trevor Taylor	Team Lotus	Lotus-Climax	69 laps	11
10	(Italy) Giuseppe Maugeri	Giuseppe Maugeri	Cooper-Climax	60 laps	22
11	(Sweden) Jo Bonnier	UDT-Laystall Racing Team	Lotus-Climax	57 laps	15
12	(United Kingdom) John Campbell-Jones	John Campbell-Jones	Cooper-Climax	57 laps	23
13	(United Kingdom) Graham Hill	Owen Racing Organisation	BRM-Climax	48 laps	4
Ret	(United Kingdom) Graham Eden	Graham Eden	Cooper-Climax	Engine	17
Ret	(United Kingdom) John Surtees	Yeoman Credit Racing Team	Cooper-Climax	Accident damage	2
Ret	(United Kingdom) Keith Greene	Gilby Engineering	Gilby-Climax	Engine	24
Ret	(New Zealand) Bruce McLaren	Cooper Car Company	Cooper-Climax	Accident	7
Ret	(Australia) Jack Brabham	Cooper Car Company	Cooper-Climax	Cam follower	8
Ret	(United Kingdom) Jackie Lewis	H & L Motors	Cooper-Climax	Ignition	9
Ret	(United Kingdom) Alan Trow	Alan Trow (Motor Cycles)	Cooper-Climax	Engine	18
Ret	(Switzerland) Michael May	Scuderia Colonia	Lotus-Climax	Overheating	14
Ret	(United Kingdom) Brian Naylor	JBW Car Co	JBW-Maserati	Overheating	20
Ret	(Germany) Wolfgang Seidel	Scuderia Colonia	Lotus-Climax	Gearbox	16
Ret	(France) Bernard Collomb	Bernard Collomb	Cooper-Climax	Fuel feed	21
DNS	(United Kingdom) Shane Summers	Terry Bartram	Cooper-Climax	Fatal accident in practice	-
WD	(United Kingdom) Cliff Allison	UDT-Laystall Racing Team	Lotus-Climax	Moss drove car	-
WD	(United Kingdom) Bruce Halford	Jim Diggory	Lotus-Climax	Car not ready	-

- Stirling Moss was entered by the Rob Walker Racing Team to drive a Cooper-Climax but he did not race this car.

Previous race: 1961 London Trophy	Formula One non-championship races 1961 season	Next race: 1961 British Empire Trophy
Previous race: 1960 Silver City Trophy	Silver City Trophy	Next race: —
