= 1961 London Trophy =

- Non-championship race in the 1961 Formula One season

Race details
- Date: 22 May 1961
- Official name: IX London Trophy
- Location: Crystal Palace
- Course: Permanent racing facility
- Course length: 2.227 km (1.384 miles)
- Distance: 37 laps, 82.4 km (51.2 miles)

Pole position
Driver	(United Kingdom) Roy Salvadori	Cooper-Climax
- Time: 59.0

Fastest lap
Driver	(United Kingdom) Roy Salvadori / Henry Taylor	Cooper-Climax / Lotus-Climax
- Time: 59.6

Podium
First	(United Kingdom) Roy Salvadori	Cooper-Climax
Second	(United Kingdom) Henry Taylor	Lotus-Climax
Third	(United Kingdom) Tony Marsh	Lotus-Climax

The 9th London Trophy was a motor race, run to Formula One rules, held on 22 May 1961 at Crystal Palace Circuit. The race was run over 37 laps of the circuit, and was won by British driver Roy Salvadori in a Cooper T53.

This race was run on the same day as the World Championship 1961 Dutch Grand Prix, but since entry to that event was by invitation only, many regular Formula One drivers were attracted to Crystal Palace.

== Results ==
Pos	Driver	Entrant	Constructor	Time/Retired	Grid
1	(United Kingdom) Roy Salvadori	Yeoman Credit Racing Team	Cooper-Climax	37:22.8	1
2	(United Kingdom) Henry Taylor	UDT-Laystall Racing Team	Lotus-Climax	+ 8.0 s	2
3	(United Kingdom) Tony Marsh	Tony Marsh	Lotus-Climax	+ 29.8 s	5
4	(United Kingdom) Shane Summers	Terry Bartram	Cooper-Climax	+1 lap	7
5	(Germany) Wolfgang Seidel	Scuderia Colonia	Lotus-Climax	+1 lap	6
6	(United Kingdom) John Campbell-Jones	John Campbell-Jones	Cooper-Climax	+2 laps	9
7	(United Kingdom) Jackie Lewis	H & L Motors	Cooper-Climax	+2 laps	3
8	(United Kingdom) Cliff Allison	UDT-Laystall Racing Team	Lotus-Climax	+2 laps	4
9	(France) Bernard Collomb	Bernard Collomb	Cooper-Climax	+3 laps	13
10	(United Kingdom) Alan Trow	Alan Trow (Motor Cycles)	Cooper-Climax	+3 laps	10
11	(United Kingdom) John Langton	Team Salvatore Evangelista	Hume-Cooper-Climax	+4 laps	11
Ret	(Italy) Giuseppe Maugeri	Giuseppe Maugeri	Cooper-Climax	Accident	12
Ret	(Netherlands) Klaas Twisk	Tulip Stable	Cooper-Climax	Engine	14
DNS	(United Kingdom) Graham Eden	Graham Eden	Cooper-Climax	Engine in practice	(8)
WD	(United Kingdom) George Morgan	Tommy Atkins	Cooper-Climax		-
WD	(Belgium) Mauro Bianchi	Equipe Nationale Belge	Emeryson-Maserati	Car not ready	-
WD	(United Kingdom) Keith Greene	Gilby Engineering	Gilby-Climax	Car not ready	-

Previous race: 1961 Naples Grand Prix	Formula One non-championship races 1961 season	Next race: 1961 Silver City Trophy
Previous race: 1955 London Trophy	London Trophy	Next race: —
