= Oscar Cabalén =

Argentine racing driver

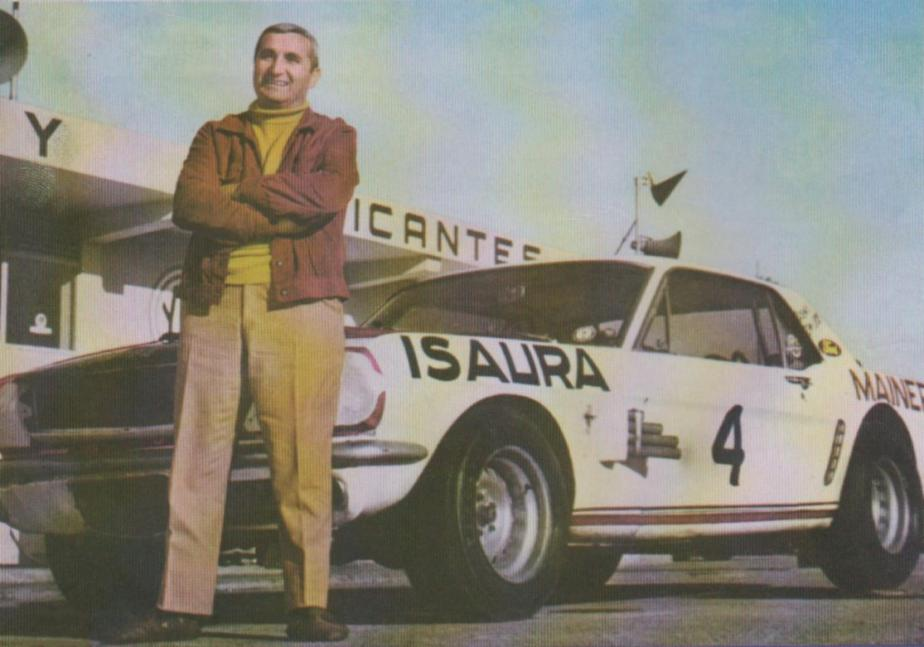
- Oscar Cabalén
- Born: February 4, 1928 Chabás, Santa Fe, Argentina
- Died: August 25, 1967 (aged 39) San Nicolás de los Arroyos, Buenos Aires, Argentina
- Debut season: 1950

Oscar Cabalén (February 4, 1928 – August 25, 1967), was an Argentine racing driver, mainly active in the Turismo Carretera series. He also took part in the Carrera Panamericana and the Mille Miglia, and was a reserve driver for the Formula One Argentine Grand Prix in 1960.

== Career ==
Nicknamed "El Turco", Cabalén bought an HRD motorcycle in 1948. Fifteen days later he won a race in Bell Ville. He competed in four further races before crashing in Calvez and fracturing his tibia and fibula, which took six months to heal. On doctors' advice, he abandoned motorcycle racing and worked for a time at his brothers' lorry company.

Switching to four wheels, Cabalén made his debut in Turismo Carretera on July 1, 1950. In 1953, he and his co-driver Guillermo Ibanda participated in the Carrera Panamericana where he finished 36th, third in the "Turismo Especial" class. The race was marred by the deaths of a number of drivers, including Felice Bonetto. The following year, with Mexican co-driver Genaro Silva, Cabalén finished 33rd and seventh in his class.

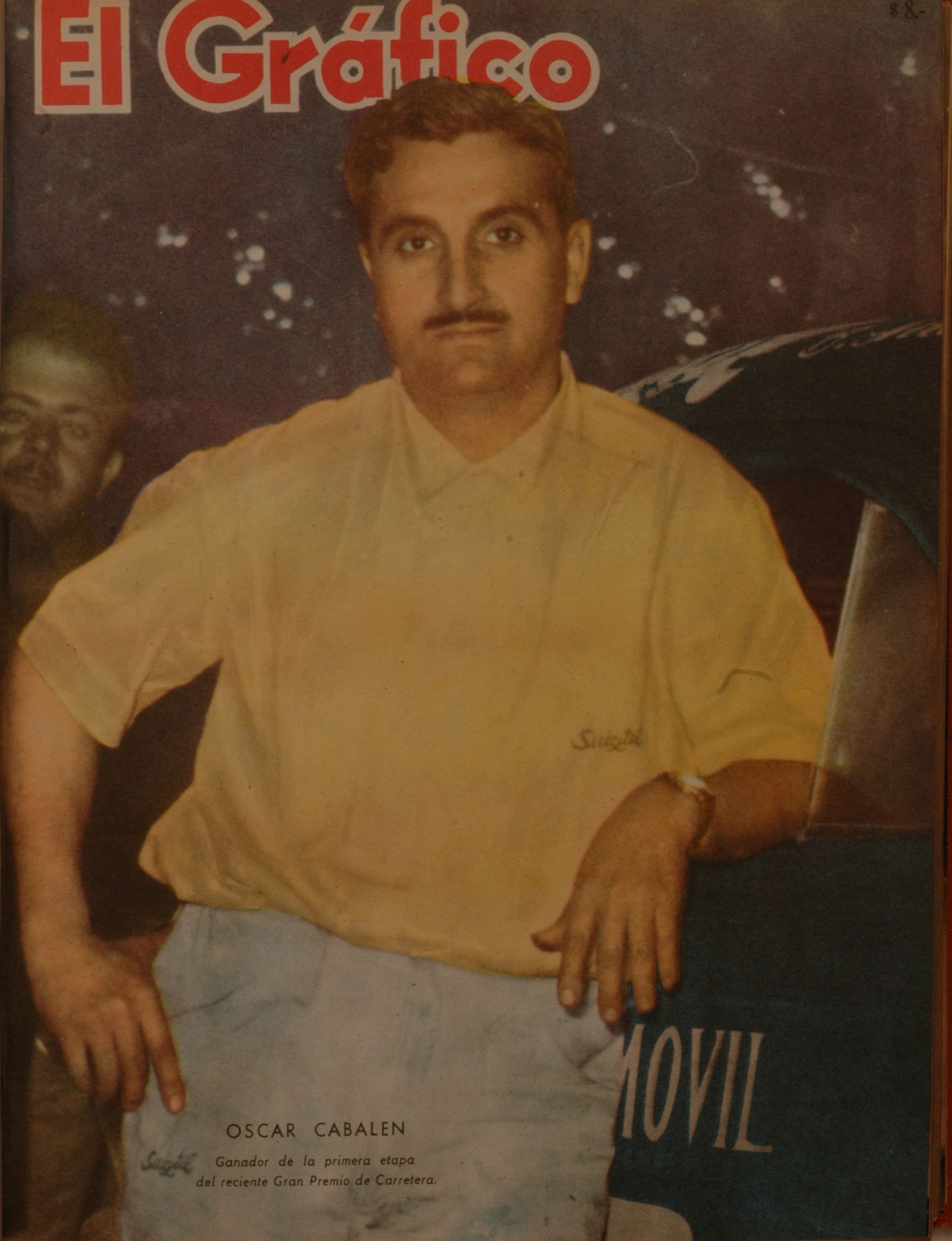
Cabalén in 1959

Following in the footsteps of his mentor and friend Juan Manuel Fangio, Cabalén moved to Europe. At the 1955 Mille Miglia in Italy, with Italian co-driver Ottavio Guarducci, he finished fifth in the Alfa Romeo Giulietta Sprint Veloce category. He later competed in the 10 Hours of Messina, driving a Ferrrai 500 Mondial with Venezuelan Joao Rezende dos Santos, and finished second behind Maurice Trintignant and Eugenio Castellotti, winning his class.

At the 1960 Argentine Grand Prix, Cabalén acted as reserve driver for fellow Argentine Nasif Estéfano, driving a Maserati 250F. Cabalén drove only during the final qualifying session, where he posted a time two-tenths of a second slower than Estéfano, but faster than Ettore Chimeri and Antonio Creus in their 250Fs.

In 1961, Cabalén returned to the Turismo Carretera series. With a Ford V8, Cabalén not only took his first victory (in Villa Carlos Paz), but was also runner-up that year, behind the champion Oscar Alfredo Gálvez.

In 1966, Cabalén won the "Gran Premio de Turismo" driving a Ford Mustang, and in 1967 he was one of the members of the "Team Racing Ford Argentina".

== Death ==
Cabalén died testing a revolutionary Ford Sport Prototype at the temporary "SOMISA de San Nicolás" circuit, in preparation for the "6th Gran Premio de TC General Manuel Savio". On one of his test runs, his car left the road at more than 205 km/h, rolled several times and caught fire, coming to rest 100 metres down the track, on its wheels. One of the team mechanics, Guillermo Luis "Pachacho" Arnáiz, was alongside him in the car, and both were killed. The fibreglass-bodied car burned very quickly together with the high octane fuel, and the occupants were trapped, perishing in the fire.

Cabalén is buried in the Cementerio de San Jerónimo, Córdoba Province. Córdoba's racetrack Autódromo Oscar Cabalén was named after him.
