= Alberto Rodríguez Larreta =

Argentine racing driver (1934–1977)

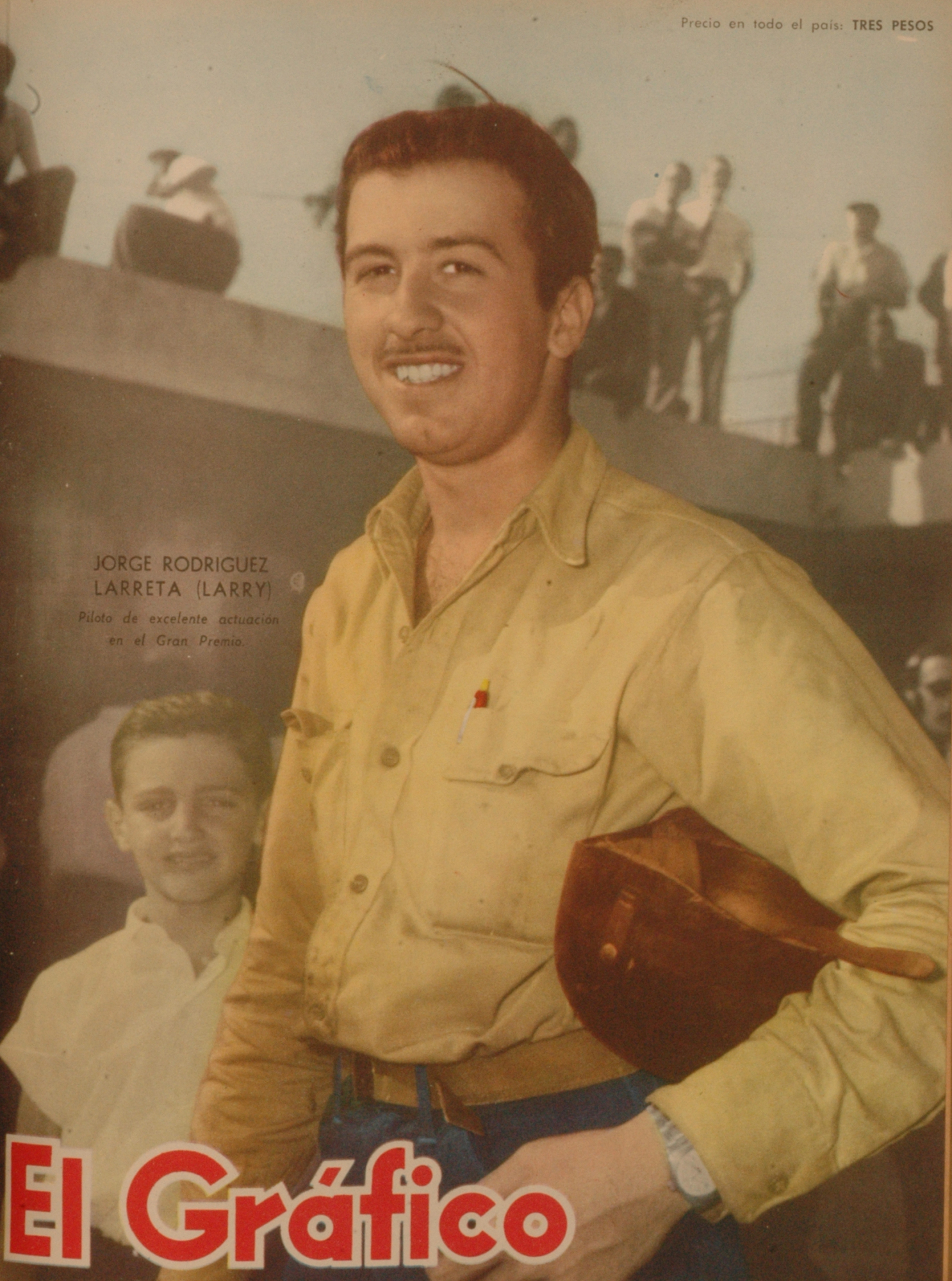
- Rodríguez Larreta, 1958
- Born: 14 January 1934; Buenos Aires, Argentina
- Died: 11 March 1977 (aged 43); Buenos Aires, Argentina

Formula One World Championship career
- Nationality: (Argentina) Argentine
- Active years: 1960
- Team: Lotus
- Entries: 1
- Championships: 0
- Wins: 0
- Podiums: 0
- Career points: 0
- Pole positions: 0
- Fastest laps: 0
- First entry: 1960 Argentine Grand Prix

Alberto Rodríguez Larreta (14 January 1934 – 11 March 1977) was a racing driver from Buenos Aires, Argentina. He participated in one World Championship Formula One Grand Prix, the 1960 Argentine Grand Prix on 7 February 1960. Driving a Lotus 16 for Team Lotus, he qualified 15th and finished in ninth place. Larreta was reportedly offered a drive by Colin Chapman, but turned it down and continued competing in a wide variety of other motorsports until 1970. He died from a heart attack in 1977.

== Complete Formula One World Championship results ==
(key)

Year	Entrant	Chassis	Engine	1	2	3	4	5	6	7	8	9	10	WDC	Points
1960	Team Lotus	Lotus 16	Climax Straight-4	ARG; 9	MON	500	NED	BEL	FRA	GBR	POR	ITA	USA	NC	0
