= Gino Munaron =

Italian racing driver (1928–2009)

- Born: Virginio Lugli Munaron; 2 April 1928; Turin, Piedmont, Kingdom of Italy
- Died: 22 November 2009 (aged 81); Valenza, Piedmont, Italy

Formula One World Championship career
- Nationality: (Italy) Italian
- Active years: 1960
- Team(s): privateer Maserati, non-works Cooper
- Entries: 4
- Championships: 0
- Wins: 0
- Podiums: 0
- Career points: 0
- Pole positions: 0
- Fastest laps: 0
- First entry: 1960 Argentine Grand Prix
- Last entry: 1960 Italian Grand Prix

Virginio "Gino" Lugli Munaron (born 2 April 1928 – died 22 November 2009) was an Italian racing driver. He participated in four Formula One World Championship Grands Prix, debuting on 7 February 1960. He scored no championship points.

== Complete Formula One World Championship results ==
(key)

Year	Entrant	Chassis	Engine	1	2	3	4	5	6	7	8	9	10	WDC	Points
1960	Gino Munaron	Maserati 250F	Maserati Straight-6	ARG; 13										NC	0
1960	Scuderia Eugenio Castellotti	Cooper T51	Ferrari Straight-4		MON	500	NED	BEL	FRA; Ret	GBR; 15	POR	ITA; Ret	USA	NC	0
