= 1954 Carrera Panamericana =

Sports car racing event

The 1954 Carrera Panamericana was the fifth and final running of the Carrera Panamericana Mexican sports car racing event, run from November 19–23, 1954. It was the sixth and final race of the 1954 World Sportscar Championship. The race was run from Tuxtla Gutiérrez, Chiapas, to Ciudad Juárez, Chihuahua, over 8 stages and 3,070 kilometres (1,910 mi). 150 cars started the race, and 85 finished all 8 stages. The race was won by Umberto Maglioli in an Erwin Goldschmidt-entered Ferrari 375 Plus. He finished the race in 17 hours, 40 minutes, and 26 seconds, averaging 173.69 kilometres per hour (107.93 mph).

== Pre-race ==
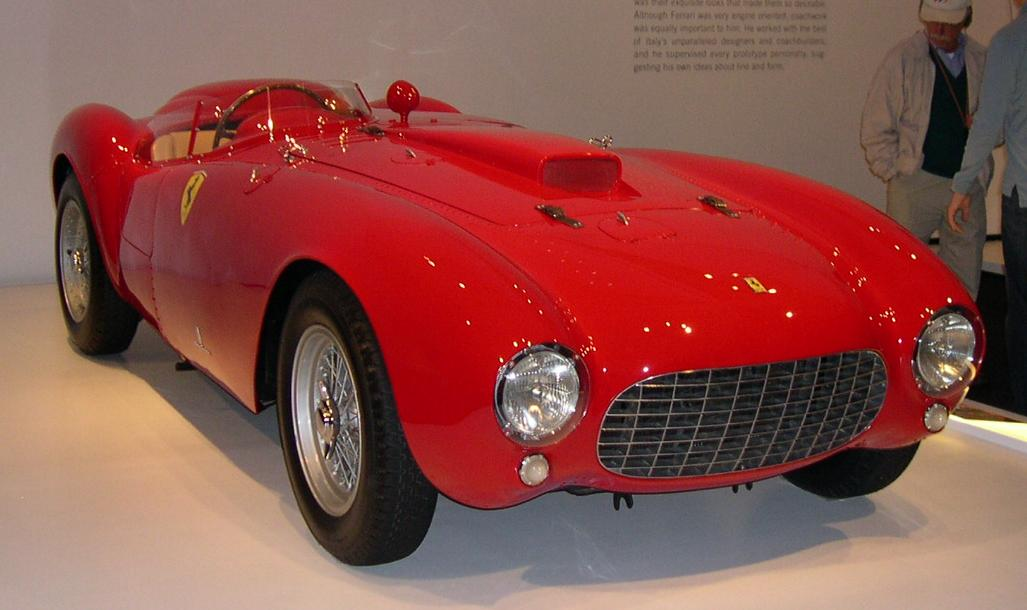
The 1954 Carrera Panamericana was won by a Ferrari 375 Plus

For 1954, the Touring classes were divided into three classes, over 3,500 cc (213.6 cu in), between 3,499 and 1,900 cc (213.5 and 115.9 cu in), and under 1,900 cc (115.9 cu in). The Sports classes were divided as before, over and under 1,500 cc (91.5 cu in). This was in order to accommodate the huge number of participants and the diverse breeds of cars within the race.

Going into the race, Ferrari had already won the championship, but victory would ensure the marque would score maximum points for the season. Although no works entries were sent from Italy, there was a number of top quality entrants from both Mexico and the United States, hoping the get that victory on behalf of the Maranello concern.

Heading into the event, pressure was mounting on Mexican government, as the annual death toll from the event caused the country to be shown in a negative light. This wasn't the kind of attention the locals wanted. It had been abundantly clear the days were numbered for the Carrera Panamericana. 1954 would be the last time the event was run in this format, although it did return as a revival event in 1988.

== Race ==
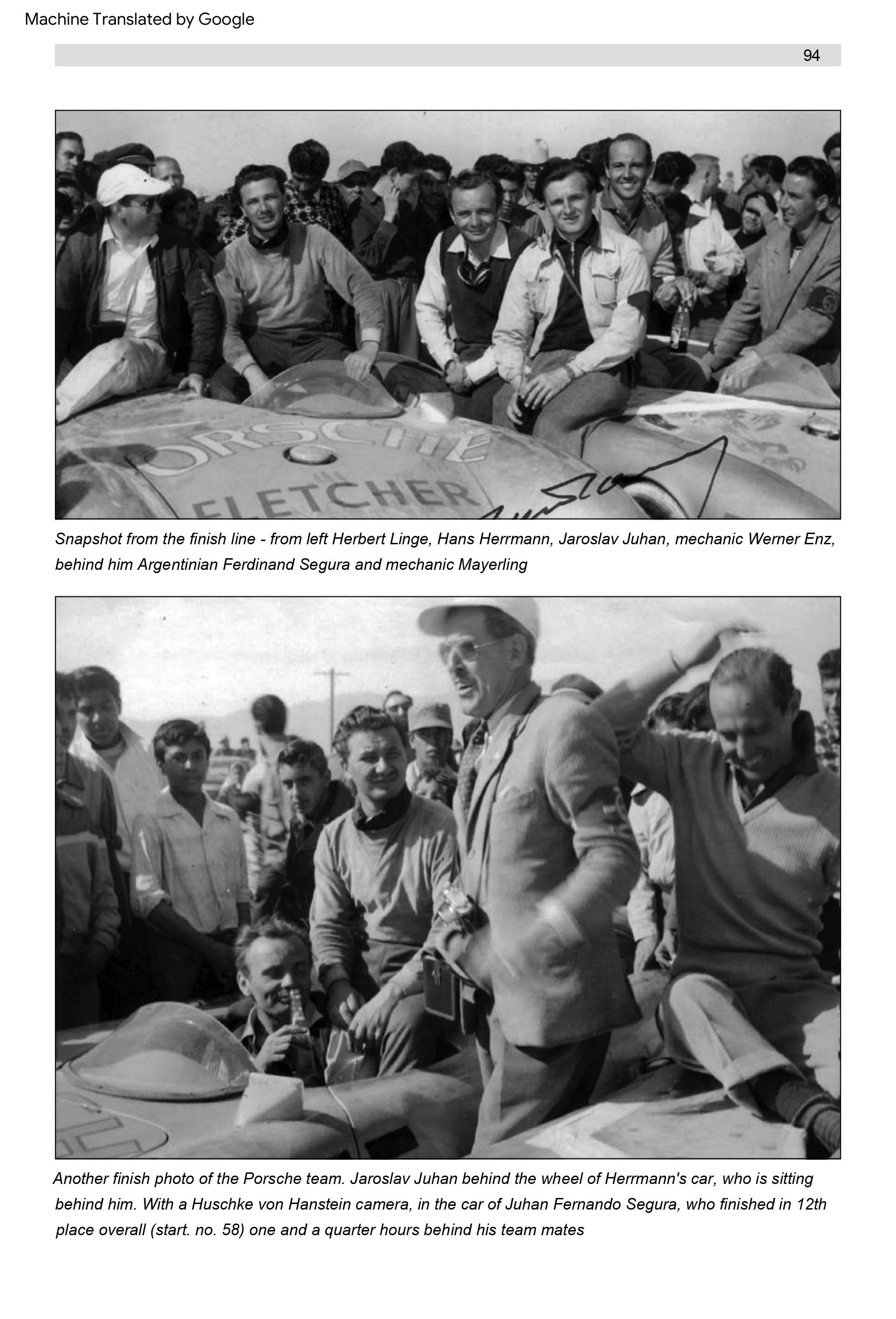
1954 Class Winners for Porsche

The race was held in eight stages over a total distance of 3,070 km (1,910 miles). The race was won overall by Umberto Maglioli in a Ferrari 375 Plus. Maglioli finished the race in 17h 40' 26", his average speed of 173.7 kilometres per hour (107.93 mph) reflected the level of professionalism and technology that led the field: the inaugural 1950 event had been won in an average speed of 111 kilometres per hour (69 mph)- and the winner had taken 10 hours longer to complete the race distance. Phil Hill and Richie Ginther took second place in another Ferrari, over 24 minutes behind. The under-1500 sports car class winner Hans Herrmann finished third in his Porsche 550, closely followed by Jaroslav Juhan in his Porsche 550 Spyder, a further 87 minutes behind the Americans. Ray Crawford and Enrique Iglesias won the over-3500 stock car class in a Lincoln, the European stock car class was won by Consalvo Sanesi and Giuseppe Cagna in an Alfa Romeo, and the small U.S. stock car class was won by Tommy Drisdale and Walter Krause, Jr. in a Dodge.

A number of the sedans from the US failed to make it through the first stage of the race. The Austin-Healey 100S of Englishman, Lance Macklin struggled from ignition troubles and retired before completing the first stage. The Ferrari 375 Plus of Jack McAfee and Ford Robinson had an accident that provided the first fatality, with the death of Robinson. Sadly, there would be fatality, when Leopoldo Olvera Zabado died following an accident on the fifth stage.

The Californian pairing of Hill and Ginther continued to look impressive, making it through the second stage in their Allen Guiberson-entered Ferrari 375 MM without incident and remaining close to the front of the overall standing. However, another American was not going so well: Carroll Shelby suffered an accident while driving his Austin-Healey 100S. Frustrated with his team-mate, Ray Jackson-Moore's slow pace, Shelby supposedly removed Jackson-Moore’s seat and took off on his own.

As the event progressed, the list of cars remaining grew shorter and shorter. Many of the strong competitors were either out of the race, or behind the leading Ferraris of Maglioli and Hill/Ginther. The two Americans continued to chase hard to rein in solo-driving Maglioli. It was a 375 MM spyder chasing after a 375 Plus, with still a long way to go before anyone could celebrate. After 1,900 miles (3,100 km) there was very little time separating the two cars.

Despite feeling the pressure, Maglioli strengthened his grip and did not make any mistakes in the closing stages of the race, finishing nearly 25 minutes ahead of Hill and Ginther.

Californian hot rodder Ak Miller became famous by finishing seventh overall, in his Oldsmobile-powered 1927 Ford.

Only months after its introduction in Mexico, the local distributor entered seven Volkswagen Beetles in order to prove their reliability and to make the car known. To maintain the given time bracket, they were required to keep an average speed of 50 miles per hour (80 km/h), but had achieved 61 miles per hour (98 km/h) during the reconnaissance runs, so expectations to finish inside the time limits were high. As they were using standard Volkswagen engines, the cars were driving bumper-to-bumper in order reduce air resistance as available power was limited. By the time the event got to Ciudad Juárez, all seven Beetles were still within the given time limit, none was disqualified, with Alfonso de Hohenlohe and Alberto Álvarez coming home in 78th place overall (7th in class), albeit, the Beetles filled seven of the last eight finishing positions.

== Official Classification ==
=== Results ===
Class winners are marked in bold.

Pos	Class	No.	Entrant	Driver(s)	Car	Stages	Time
1	**S+1.5**	**19**	**Erwin Goldschmidt**	**(Italy) Umberto Maglioli**	**Ferrari 375 Plus**	**8**	**17:40:26**
2	S+1.5	20	Allen Guiberson	(United States) Phil Hill (United States) Richie Ginther	Ferrari 375 MM Vignale	8	18:04:50
3	**S1.5**	**55**	**Dist. VW Central, S.A.**	**(Germany) Hans Herrmann**	**Porsche 550 Spyder**	**8**	**19:32:33**
4	S1.5	56	Jaroslav Juhan	(Guatemala) Jaroslav Juhan	Porsche 550 Spyder	8	19:33:09
5	S+1.5	22	Prado Américas	(Italy) Franco Cornacchia (Argentina) Enrico Peruchini	Ferrari 250 Monza Scaglietti	8	19:45:06
6	S+1.5	24	John Shakespeare	(United States) Luigi Chinetti (United States) John Shakespeare	Ferrari 375 MM Pinin Farina	8	20:10:28
7	S+1.5	11	Akton Miller	(United States) Ak Miller (United States) Douglas Harrison	Caballo de Hiero Oldsmobile	8	20:21:09
8	S1.5	54	Monte Carlo Auto Sport	(France) Louis Chiron (France) Robert Delpech	Osca MT4 1500 Morelli	8	20:34:56
9	**T+3.5**	**149**	**Lincoln**	**(United States) Ray Crawford** **(Mexico) Enrique Iglesias**	**Lincoln Capri**	**8**	**20:40:19**
10	T+3.5	103	Lincoln	(United States) Walt Faulkner (United States) Francis W. Hainley	Lincoln Capri	8	20:42:07
11	T+3.5	127	Barry Motor Sales	(United States) Keith Andrews (United States) Blue Plemond	Cadillac Series 62	8	20:43:14
12	S1.5	58	Dist. VW Central, S.A.	(Argentina) Fernando Segura (Germany) Herbert Linge	Porsche 550 Spyder	8	20:46:23
13	S+1.5	9	Jean Trévoux	(France) Jean Trévoux (Mexico) Armando González	Packard Motto Special	8	20:48:31
14	T+3.5	110	Adolph Otterstein	(United States) Edward A. Stringer (United States) Truman C. Wood	Cadillac Series 62	8	21:15:13
15	**TE1.9**	**251**	**Alfa Romeo Finmeccanica**	**(Italy) Consalvo Sanesi** **(Italy) Giuseppe Cagna**	**Alfa Romeo 1900 TI**	**8**	**21:50:42**
16	T+3.5	111	Coca-Cola Mexico	(Mexico) Luis Leal Solares (Mexico) Alfredo García Avila	Buick Century	8	21:51:17
17	T+3.5	113	Coca-Cola Mexico	(Mexico) Ricardo Ramírez (Mexico) Joséfat Larios Zuniga	Buick Century	8	21:59:34
18	TE1.9	256	Alfa Romeo Finmeccanica	(Italy) Sergio Mantovani (Italy) Bruno Chiappa	Alfa Romeo 1900 TI	8	22:06:25
19	TE1.9	267	Alfa Romeo Finmeccanica	(Italy) Mario Della Favera (Italy) Egidio Campigotto	Alfa Romeo 1900 TI	8	22:06:50
20	TE1.9	255	Alfa Romeo Finmeccanica	(Italy) Piero Carini (Italy) Giuseppe Sambrotta	Alfa Romeo 1900 TI	8	22:19:04
21	T+3.5	119	Pacheco y Cia	(United States) Douglas Ehlinger (Mexico) Luis Solorio	Packard Clipper	8	22:23:34
22	T+3.5	115	Coca-Cola Mexico	(Mexico) Julio Mariscal (Mexico) Luis Pombo Rivadeneyra	Buick Century	8	22:30:39
23	**TS**	**226**	**Tommy Drisdale**	**(United States) Tommy Drisdale** **(United States) Walter Krause, Jr.**	**Dodge V-8**	8	**22:35:53**
24	TS	217	Dickshire	(United States) C. D. Evans (Mexico) Armando Velázquez	Dodge V-8	8	22:50:44
25	T+3.5	133	Abraham Yunes	(Mexico) Raymundo Corona (Mexico) Enrique Ortega Aguillar	Packard	8	22:51:20
26	T+3.5	124	Baja California	(Mexico) Francisco Ramírez Fonseca (Mexico) Alberto Maya Juarez	Lincoln Capri	8	22:52:16
27	TS	231	Ray C. Elliot	(United States) Ray Elliott (United States) Edward B. Stark	Dodge V-8	8	22:52:16
28	S1.5	51	Calzado Canadá S.A.	(Mexico) Salvador López Chávez	Porsche 550 Spyder	8	22:57:31
29	TS	211	Álvarez Tostado	(Mexico) Arturo Álvarez Tostado (Mexico) Alfredo Cabrero Porras	Dodge V-8	8	23:00:18
30	TE1.9	252	Atoyac	(Mexico) Adolfo Velázquez (Mexico) Horacio Ruíz	Alfa Romeo 1900 TI	8	23:00:57
31	TS	238	Scott F. Yantis	(United States) Scott F. Yantis	Studebaker Commander	8	23:02:04
32	TS	208	Dehler	(Mexico) Moisés Solana (Mexico) Enrique Doblado	Dodge V-8	8	23:08:40
33	TS	209	Oscar Cabalen	(Argentina) Oscar Cabalén (Mexico) Genaro Silva	Ford V-8	8	23:08:55
34	TS	331	Floyd Clymer	(Italy) Piero Taruffi (United States) Bob Feurchelm	Ford 6	8	23:15:51
35	TS	237	Ferreteria del Sol	(Mexico) Ramiro Aguilar, Jr. (Mexico) Alfonso L. Franco	Dodge	8	23:18:45
36	TS	201	Refrescos Jarrito	(Mexico) Octavio Anza Esquivel (United States) Johnny Mantz (Mexico) L. Constancio Ruíz	Ford	8	23:19:06
37	T+3.5	117	Tony de Rosa	(Argentina) Tony de Rosa (Argentina) Alfonso Bustos	Lincoln Capri	8	23:27:31
38	TS	219	Malcolm Eckart	(United States) Malcolm Eckart (United States) Carroll Hamplemann	Hudson Wasp	8	23:28:09
39	TS	218	Puebla	(Mexico) Francisco Rodríguez Sánchez (Mexico) Roberto Vargas	Dodge Royal	8	23:37:47
40	TS	220	Manuel Luz Meneses	(Mexico) Manuel Luz Meneses	Studebaker Commander	8	23:47:42
41	TS	232	Félix Alberto Peduzzi	(Argentina) Félix Alberto Peduzzi (Argentina) Eduardo del Molino	Ford	8	23:56:10
42	TS	326	Raimundo Caparrós	(Argentina) Raimundo Caparrós (Argentina) Heldi Paladino	Chevrolet Bel Air	8	24:01:33
43	TS	243	Osvaldo José Mantega	(Argentina) Osvaldo José Mantega (Argentina) Ernesto Nuñez	Chevrolet Bel Air	8	24:07:51
44	TS	213	Abelardo Matamoros	(Mexico) Abelardo Matamoros Acosta (Mexico) Raúl Blancas	Studebaker Commander	8	24:12:47
45	TS	320	Vincente Tirabasso	(Argentina) Vincente Tirabasso (Argentina) Ruben Giscoman	Chevrolet Bel Air	8	24:13:16
46	TS	216	Jorge Descote	(Argentina) Jorge Descote (Argentina) Mantolin Sánchez Marín	Chevrolet Bel Air	8	24:13:17
47	TS	340	Tadeo Taddia	(Argentina) Tadeo Taddia (Argentina) Sebastián Messino	Chevrolet Bel Air	8	24:16:41
48	TS	342	Baltazar Alaimo	(Argentina) Baltazar Alaimo (Argentina) Eliseo Rodríguez	Chevrolet Bel Air	8	24:18:18
49	TS	229	Marcos Ciani	(Argentina) Marcos Ciani (Argentina) Juan Munguin	Chevrolet Bel Air	8	24:20:28
50	TS	227	Enrique Paredes	(Mexico) Enrique Paredes (Mexico) Luis Herrastri	Ford	8	24:22:58
51	TS	245	Raúl Jaras	(Chile) Raúl Jaras (Chile) Tomás L. Bravo	Chevrolet Bel Air	8	24:28:47
52	TS	205	Union de Choferes	(Mexico) Roberto Belmar (Mexico) Félix San Roman	Studebaker Commander	8	24:32:28
53	TS	330	Robert C. Lilienthal	(United States) Robert C. Lilienthal (United States) Wendell Anderson	Ford	8	24:37:27
54	T+3.5	130	Guillermo Suhr Contreras	(Guatemala) Guillermo Suhr Contreras (Guatemala) Óscar Alfonso Aguilar	Oldsmobile Super 88	8	24:42:00
55	TS	221	Rafael Larocca	(Argentina) Rafael Larocca (Argentina) Virginio Aguilar	Chevrolet Bel Air	8	24:43:48
56	TS	301	Jorge Zorzi Olazábel	(Argentina) Jorge Zorzi Olazábel (Argentina) Oreste Botta	Chevrolet Bel Air	8	24:49:46
57	TS	310	Ernesto Beronio	(Argentina) Ernesto Beronio	Ford	8	24:54:46
58	TS	247	Hernán Videla	(Chile) Hernán Videla (Chile) Domingo Venturelli	Chevrolet Bel Air	8	24:58:20
59	TS	240	Salvador Torisse	(Argentina) Salvador Torisse (Argentina) Enrique Torrente	Chevrolet Bel Air	8	25:03:34
60	TS	303	Ángel de la Rosa	(Argentina) Ángel de la Rosa (Argentina) Ángel Antenone	Chevrolet Bel Air	8	25:11:40
61	T+3.5	107	Manuel Acosta Muñoz	(Mexico) Manuel Acosta Muñoz (Mexico) Fernando Najera	Buick Century	8	25:15:09
62	TS	241	Pablo Gulle	(Argentina) Pablo Gulle (Argentina) Domingo Reyes	Chevrolet Bel Air	8	25:33:21
63	TS	233	Andrés Ferreno Barreiro	(Argentina) Andrés Ferreno Barreiro (Argentina) Luis María Martorani	Ford	8	25:43:39
64	TS	314	Daniel Musso	(Argentina) Daniel Musso (Argentina) Alejandro Navarro	Ford	8	25:52:59
65	TS	321	Melvin H. Stickney	(United States) Melvin H. Stickney (Argentina) Walter E. von Schoenfeld	Ford	8	25:53:38
66	TS	325	Luis Egidio Parnisari	(Argentina) Luis Egidio Parnisari (Argentina) Mario A. Alfaro	Ford V-8	8	26:01:04
67	S1.5	59	Otto Becker Estrada	(Mexico) Otto Becker Estrada	Porsche 356 1500 Super	8	26:07:59
68	TS	323	Joaquin Salas Ferrer	(Chile) Joaquin Salas Ferrer (Mexico) Carlos Buenaventura Pérez	Ford	8	26:13:38
69	TS	305	Alberto Loguló	(Argentina) Alberto Loguló (Argentina) Ismael Cañas	Ford	8	26:16:22
70	S1.5	53	Ernst-Joachin Hirz	(Germany) Ernst-Joachin Hirz	Porsche 356 1500 Super	8	26:22:24
71	TS	332	Carlos Pfeffer	(Argentina) Carlos Pfeffer	Ford	8	26:31:25
72	TS	334	César Óscar Vidales	(Argentina) César Óscar Vinales	Ford	8	26:40:32
73	TS	312	Óscar Cremer	(Chile) Óscar Cremer (Chile) Marcos Pliego	Ford	8	26:56:19
74	TE1.9	253	Carl Borgward	(Germany) Adolf Brudes (Germany) Erick Bock	Borgward Isabella	8	27:02:36
75	TS	316	Pedro Petinari	(Argentina) Pedro Petinari	Ford	8	28:15:48
76	TS	242	Antonio Pingeon	(Argentina) Antonio Pingeon (Argentina) Manuel José Galandrino	Ford	8	28:18:23
77	TS	313	Americo Guzzini	(Argentina) Americo Guzzini (Argentina) Bernardo Guzzini	Ford Crestline Custom 2 Door Coupe	8	29:02:01
78	TE1.9	261	Alfonso de Hohenlohe	(Mexico) Alfonso de Hohenlohe (Mexico) Alberto Álvarez	Volkswagen 1200 De Luxe	8	30:14:12
79	TE1.9	263	Alfonso de Hohenlohe	(Mexico) Manuel Hinke	Volkswagen 1200 De Luxe	8	30:15:54
80	TE1.9	262	Alfonso de Hohenlohe	(Netherlands) Jan Wyers (Netherlands) Rene Wyers	Volkswagen 1200 De Luxe	8	30:17:56
81	TS	246	Bartollo Abello	(Argentina) Bartollo Abello (Argentina) Adolfo Cañas	Ford	8	31:01:04
82	TE1.9	270	Alfonso de la Peña Cardona	(Mexico) Alfonso de la Peña Cardona	Volkswagen 1200 De Luxe	8	31:01:43
83	TE1.9	271	Alfonso de Hohenlohe	(Mexico) Axel Wars	Volkswagen 1200 De Luxe	8	31:04:41
84	TE1.9	272	Ara Arakelian	(Mexico) Ara Arakelian	Volkswagen 1200 De Luxe	8	31:11:07
85	TE1.9	269	Juan de Aguinaco	(Mexico) Juan de Aguinaco	Volkswagen 1200 De Luxe	8	31:15:59
86 DISQ	S1.5	100	Jacqueline Evans de López	(United Kingdom) Jacqueline Evans	Porsche 356 SL	8	Over time limit
87 DNF	T+3.5	106	Philips Radio Mexico	(Mexico) Félix Cerda Loza (Mexico) Raúl Aguilar	Lincoln Capri	7	DNF
88 DNF	T+3.5	112	Coca-Cola Mexico	(Mexico) Fernando Razo Maciel (Mexico) Sergio Campos Yanez	Buick Century	7	Accident
89 DNF	T+3.5	122	Pat Zoccano	(United States) Pat Zoccano	Buick	6	DNF
90 DNF	TS	212	Dan Morgan	(United States) Dan Morgan (United States) Frank Valchucks	Ford	6	Accident
91 DNF	T+3.5	116	Super Diesel	(Mexico) Alfonso César Franco (Mexico) José Hernández	Buick Riviera	5	DNF
92 DNF	TS	203	Leonel M. Garza	(Mexico) Leonel M. Garza (Mexico) Leobardo Elizondo	Chevrolet Bel Air	5	DNF
93 DNF	TS	210	Hollywood Deeptone	(United States) 'Flash' Gordon (Mexico) Roberto Castañeda	Ford	5	DNF
94 DNF	TS	215	Productos Automotrices	(Mexico) Carlos Díaz Garcilazo (Mexico) Federico Carazín	Studebaker Champion	5	Accident
95 DNF	TE1.9	268	Alfa Romeo Finmeccanica	(Italy) Bruno Bonini (Italy) Piero Zanavoni	Alfa Romeo 1900 TI	5	Accident damage
96 DNF	TS	315	Victorio Menghi	(Argentina) Victorio Menghi (Argentina) Leopoldo Olvera Zabado	Chevrolet Bel Air	5	Fatal accident (Zabado)
97 DNF	TS	319	Santos Martín	(Argentina) Santos Martín (Argentina) Horacio Zumelzu	Ford	5	DNF
98 DNF	TS	328	Carlos Battilana Olazábal	(Argentina) Carlos Battilana Olazábal (Argentina) Óscar Martorani	Ford	5	DNF
99 DNF	S+1.5	13	Javier Velázquez	(Mexico) Francisco Ibarra (Mexico) Fernando Pinal	Jaguar C-Type	4	Oil leak
100 DNF	S+1.5	16	Óscar Fano Bush	(Mexico) Óscar Fano Bush (Mexico) Roberto Barajas	Jaguar XK120	4	Mechanical
101 DNF	TS	207	Lineas Union del Sur	(Mexico) Olegario Pérez Pliego (Mexico) Asención Morales	Ford	4	Mechanical
102 DNF	TS	222	Bujias MexiCanas	(Mexico) Héctor Ortiz Palacios (Mexico) Vicente Solar	Dodge Royal	4	Accident
103 DNF	TS	230	Plinio Larocca	(Argentina) Plinio Larocca (Argentina) Rogelio Cruz	Ford	4	Mechanical
104 DNF	TS	250	Patricio Achura	(Argentina) Patricio Achurra Sánchez (Chile) Jean Safont	Ford	4	Accident
105 DNF	S+1.5	10	Allen Guiberson	(Spain) Joaquin Palacio Power (Spain) Celso Fernández	Pegaso Z-102 BS Touring	3	Accident
106 DNF	S+1.5	32	Cabero	(Mexico) Alberto del Campo (Mexico) Jorge Mejía Martínez	Cabero Special Ford	3	Accident
107 DNF	S1.5	60	Carl Borgward	(Germany) Karl-Günther Bechem (Germany) Rudolf Herzog	Borgward Rennsport 55	3	Accident
108 DNF	T+3.5	105	Gas Atlas	(Mexico) Miguel García Bastida (Mexico) Pedro Gómez	Lincoln Capri	3	Wheel
109 DNF	TS	204	Mickey Thompson	(United States) Mickey Thompson (United States) Rodger Flores	Ford	3	Accident
110 DISQ	TS	225	Frank Davis	(United States) Frank Davis (United States) Dennis Cannon	Dodge	3	Accident
111 DNF	TS	234	Eduardo d'Alessandro	(Argentina) Eduardo D'Alessandro (Argentina) Francisco Vega Monroy	Chevrolet Bel Air	3	Over time limit
112 DNF	TS	249	Eugenio Guerrero	(Argentina) Eugenio Guerrero (Argentina) Ricardo Varela	Dodge	3	Mechanical
113 DNF	TE1.9	257	Alfa Romeo Finmeccanica	(Mexico) José Antonio Solana (Mexico) Luis Leguizamo	Alfa Romeo 1900 TI	3	DNF
114 DNF	TS	311	Bartolomé Ortiz	(Chile) Bartolomé Ortiz (Mexico) Aurelio Lara	Ford	3	Engine
115 DNF	TS	341	Eugenio Modica	(Argentina) Eugenio Modica (Argentina) Ignacio Espina	Chevrolet Bel Air	3	Accident
116 DNF	S1.5	52	Escuderia Espaňa	(Argentina) Roberto Mieres	Osca MT4 1500	2	Engine
117 DNF	T+3.5	101	Ángel Acar	(Mexico) Ángel Acar Valle (Mexico) Heriberto Angulo	Lincoln Capri	2	DNF
118 DNF	TE1.9	265	David Cerezo	(Guatemala) David Cerezo (Guatemala) Carlos A. Palacios	Alfa Romeo 1900T	2	Accident
119 DNF	TS	318	Antonio Gómez	(Argentina) Antonio Gómez	Ford	2	DNF
120 DNF	S+1.5	8	Donald Healey	(United States) Carroll Shelby (United Kingdom) Ray Jackson-Moore	Austin-Healey 100S	1	Accident
121 DNF	S1.5	61	Carl Borgward	(Switzerland) Franz Hammernick (Germany) Fritz Jüttner	Borgward Rennsport 55	1	Accident
122 DNF	S1.5	62	Manfredo Lippmann	(Guatemala) Manfredo Lippmann	Osca MT4 2AD 1500 Morelli Super	1	Mechanical
123 DNF	T+3.5	108	Lincoln	(United States) Bill Vukovich (United States) Vern Houle	Lincoln Capri	1	Accident
124 DNF	T+3.5	114	Coca-Cola Mexico	(Mexico) Héctor Riva Palacio (Mexico) Roberto García	Buick Century	1	DNF
125 DNF	T+3.5	123	Luis Rafael Garzón	(Colombia) Luis Rafael Garzón (Colombia) Luis Alfonso Murcia	Lincoln Capri	1	Accident
126 DNF	TS	206	Pedro Ovies Sánchez	(Cuba) Pedro Ovies Sánchez (Cuba) Federico Tomeu	Ford	1	DNF
127 DNF	TS	228	Pepe Russo	(Argentina) Pepe Russo (Argentina) Pedro González	Ford	1	DNF
128 DNF	TE1.9	258	Pedro J. Llano	(Argentina) Pedro J. Llano	Alfa Romeo 1900T	1	DNF
129 DNF	TE1.9	260	Guillermo Airaldi	(Argentina) Guillermo G. Airaldi	Alfa Romeo 1900T	1	DNF
130 DNF	S+1.5	1	John Edgar	(United States) Jack McAfee (United States) Ford Robinson	Ferrari 375 Plus	0	Fatal accident (Robinson)
131 DNF	S+1.5	2	Scuderia Espana	(Spain) Alfonso de Portago	Ferrari 750 Monza Scaglietti	0	Oil pipe
132 DISQ	S+1.5	3	Dominicana	(Dominican Republic) Porfirio Rubirosa (United States) Ernie McAfee	Ferrari 500 Mondial Scaglietti	0	Over time limit
133 DISQ	S+1.5	4	Erwin Goldschmidt	(Argentina) Roberto Bonomi (Argentina) Carlos Peyloubet	Ferrari 375 MM	0	Over time limit
134 DNF	S+1.5	6	Jack Ensley	(United States) Robert Christie	Kurtis-Nash 500M	0	Engine
135 DNF	S+1.5	7	Donald Healey	(United Kingdom) Lance Macklin (United Kingdom) Donald Healey	Austin-Healey 100S	0	Ignition
136 DNF	S+1.5	12	Bill von Esser	(United States) Bill von Esser (United States) Ernest Pultz	Chevrolet Corvette	0	Engine
137 DISQ	S+1.5	14	Hotel del Prado	(Italy) Giovanni Bracco (Italy) Riccardo Livocchi	Ferrari 750 Monza Scaglietti	0	Over time limit
138 DISQ	S+1.5	17	Duane Carter	(United States) Duane Carter	Kurtis-Oldsmobile 500S	0	Over time limit
139 DNF	S1.5	99	Cruz Blanca	(United States) Jim Cassidy	Cassidy Special MG	0	Mechanical
140 DNF	T+3.5	102	Lincoln	(United States) Chuck Stevenson (United States) Chuck Daigh	Lincoln Capri	0	Engine
141 DNF	T+3.5	104	Lincoln	(United States) Johnny Mantz	Lincoln Capri	0	Engine
142 DNF	T+3.5	109	Lincoln	(United States) Jack McGrath (United States) Manny Ayulo	Lincoln Capri	0	Accident
143 DNF	T+3.5	118	Lincoln	(Mexico) Ferdinando de Leeuw Murphy (Mexico) Victor Becerra	Lincoln Capri	0	Engine
144 DNF	T+3.5	120	Ronald R. Ferguson	(United States) Leonard D. Sutton (United States) Ronald R. Ferguson	Lincoln Capri	0	Mechanical
145 DNF	T+3.5	128	Ernest C. Hall	(United States) Ernest C. Hall (United States) Louis Unser	Buick	0	Mechanical
146 DNF	T+3.5	167	Converse Motors	(United States) Bob Korf (United States) Walter A. Judge	Chrysler	0	Mechanical
147 DNF	TS	202	Refrescos Jarrito	(Mexico) Ricardo Anza (Mexico) Ricardo López Ramírez	Ford 6	0	Accident
148 DNF	TE1.9	254	Anaconda Nacional	(Italy) Guido Mancini (Mexico) Francisco Mijares	Alfe Romeo 1900 T	0	Mechanical
149 DNF	TS	302	Jean-Manuel Bordeu	(Argentina) Juan Manuel Bordeu (Argentina) Raúl Bujeiro	Chevrolet Bel Air	0	Mechanical
150 DNF	TS	324	Humberto Maneglia	(Argentina) Humberto Maneglia (Mexico) Ramón Leal Contreras	Dodge Royal	0	Mechanical

=== Class Winners ===
Class	Winners		
Sport deste 1500 cc	19	Ferrari 375 Plus Pinin Farina	Maglioli
Sport hasta 1500 cc	55	Porsche 550 Spyder	Herrmann
Tourismo deste 3500 cc	194	Lincoln Capri	Crawford / Iglesias
Tourismo Especial	226	Dodge V-8	Drisdale / Krause, Jr.
Tourismo Europeo	251	Alfa Romeo 1900 TI	Sanesi / Cagna

== Standings after the race ==
Pos	Championship	Points
1	(Italy) Ferrari	32 (38)
2	(Italy) Lancia	20
3	(United Kingdom) Jaguar	10
4	(Italy) O.S.C.A.	8
5	(Italy) Maserati	7

Note:
- Only the top five positions are included in this set of standings.
- Championship points were awarded for the first six places in each race in the order of 8-6-4-3-2-1.
- Manufacturers were awarded points only for their highest finishing car with no points awarded for positions filled by additional cars.
- Only the best 4 results out of the 6 races could be retained by each manufacturer. Total points earned are listed within brackets in the above table.

World Sportscar Championship
Previous race: RAC Tourist Trophy	1954 season	Next race: 1000km Buenos Aires (1955)
