= Roberto Bonomi =

Argentine racing driver (1919–1992)

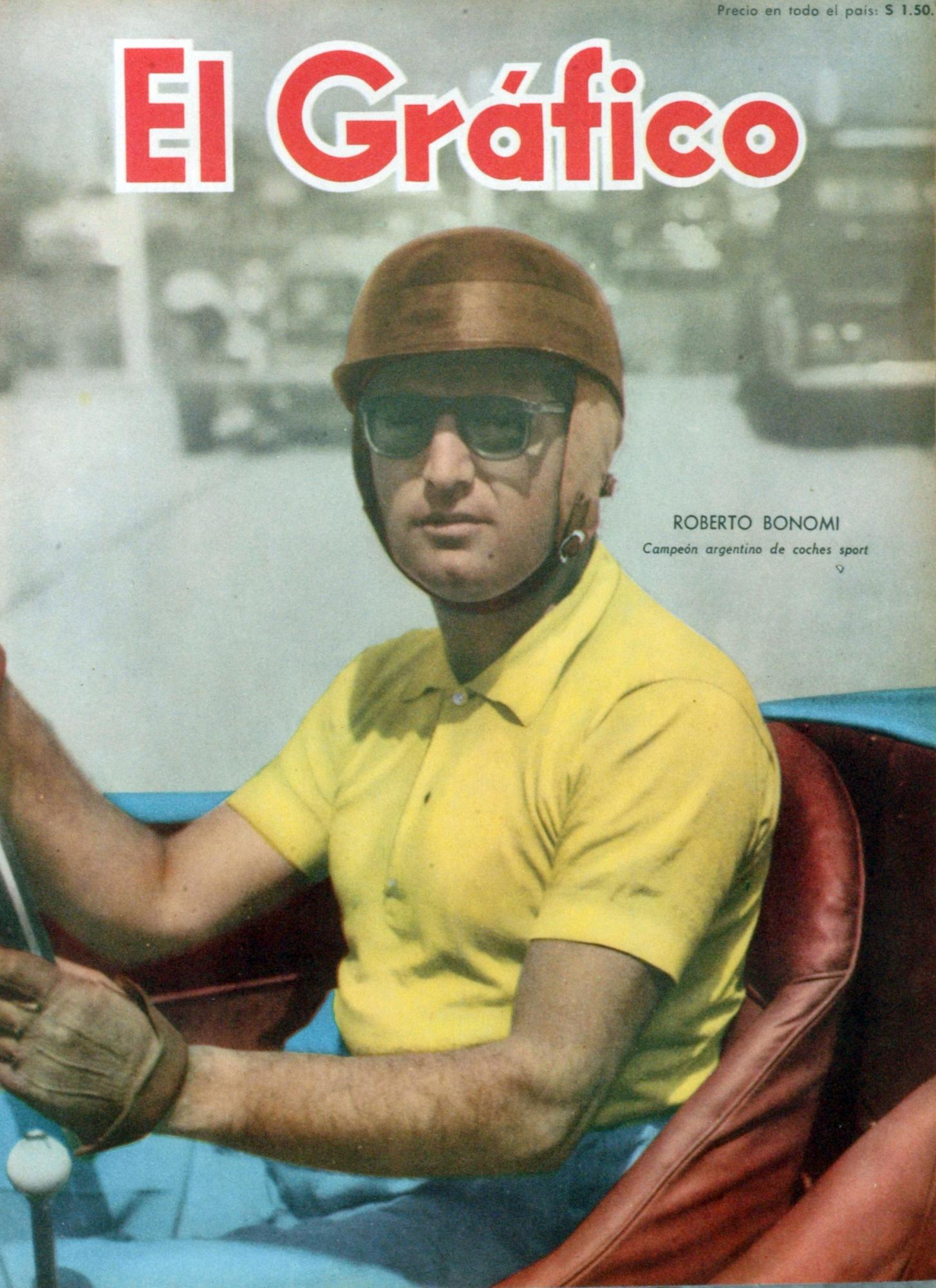
- Born: Roberto Wenceslao Bonomi Oliva; 30 September 1919; Buenos Aires, Argentina
- Died: 10 January 1992 (aged 72); Buenos Aires, Argentina

Formula One World Championship career
- Nationality: (Argentina) Argentine
- Active years: 1960
- Team: Scuderia Centro Sud
- Entries: 1
- Championships: 0
- Wins: 0
- Podiums: 0
- Career points: 0
- Pole positions: 0
- Fastest laps: 0
- First entry: 1960 Argentine Grand Prix

Roberto Wenceslao Bonomi Oliva (30 September 1919 in Buenos Aires, Argentina – 10 January 1992) was a racing driver who took part in one Formula One World Championship Grand Prix driving a Cooper for the Scuderia Centro Sud team. Before he participated in Formula One he was a sports car champion in 1952 and 1953, as well as a member of the Argentine team to race in Europe. Bonomi worked as a local politician and landowner.

== Complete Formula One World Championship results ==
(key)

Year	Entrant	Chassis	Engine	1	2	3	4	5	6	7	8	9	10	WDC	Points
1960	Scuderia Centro Sud	Cooper T51	Maserati Straight-4	ARG; 11	MON	500	NED	BEL	FRA	GBR	POR	ITA	USA	NC	0
