= Ettore Chimeri =

Venezuelan racing driver (1921–1960)

- Born: 4 June 1921; Lodi, Italy
- Died: 27 February 1960 (aged 38); Havana, Cuba

Formula One World Championship career
- Nationality: (Venezuela) Venezuelan
- Active years: 1960
- Team: privateer Maserati
- Entries: 1
- Championships: 0
- Wins: 0
- Podiums: 0
- Career points: 0
- Pole positions: 0
- Fastest laps: 0
- First entry: 1960 Argentine Grand Prix

Ettore Muro Chimeri (4 June 1921 – 27 February 1960) was a racing driver from Venezuela. He was born in Lodi, near Milan, Italy, but his family later settled in Venezuela. He was the first Venezuelan ever to compete in a Formula One Grand Prix.

== Biography ==
Chimeri became a popular gentleman racing driver and competed with success in many local races in Venezuela. He raced in the Venezuelan Grand Prix held in Los Proceres, Caracas. His success and skill in car racing, gave him the enthusiasm for keep going forward, and he started an international professional promotion, racing sport cars and one-seater cars.

Chimeri participated in one Formula One World Championship Grand Prix, the 1960 Argentine Grand Prix on 7 February 1960, in his Maserati 250F (a car he owned, previously raced by Juan Manuel Fangio and Francisco Godia, prepared in Venezuela and sold to an Italian buyer sometime after his death). Chimeri qualified 14th, but failed to finish the race having experienced electrical problems, and retired after 37 of 95 laps. He scored no championship points, but he wished to keep going in the Formula One calendar that year.

Two weeks later, while practicing for the Gran Premio Libertad sports car race at the Camp Freedom military airfield on the edge of Havana, Chimeri's Ferrari 250TR crashed through barriers and plunged 150 feet (46 m) into a ravine. Chimeri was flown to hospital, where he died later that day.

== Complete Formula One World Championship results ==
(key)

Year	Entrant	Chassis	Engine	1	2	3	4	5	6	7	8	9	10	WDC	Points
1959	Ettore Chimeri	Maserati 250F	Maserati Straight-6	MON	500	NED	FRA	GBR	GER	POR	ITA	USA; DNA		NC	0
1960	Ettore Chimeri	Maserati 250F	Maserati Straight-6	ARG; Ret	MON	500	NED	BEL	FRA	GBR	POR	ITA	USA	NC	0
