= 1960 Formula One season =

14th season of the FIA's Formula One motor racing

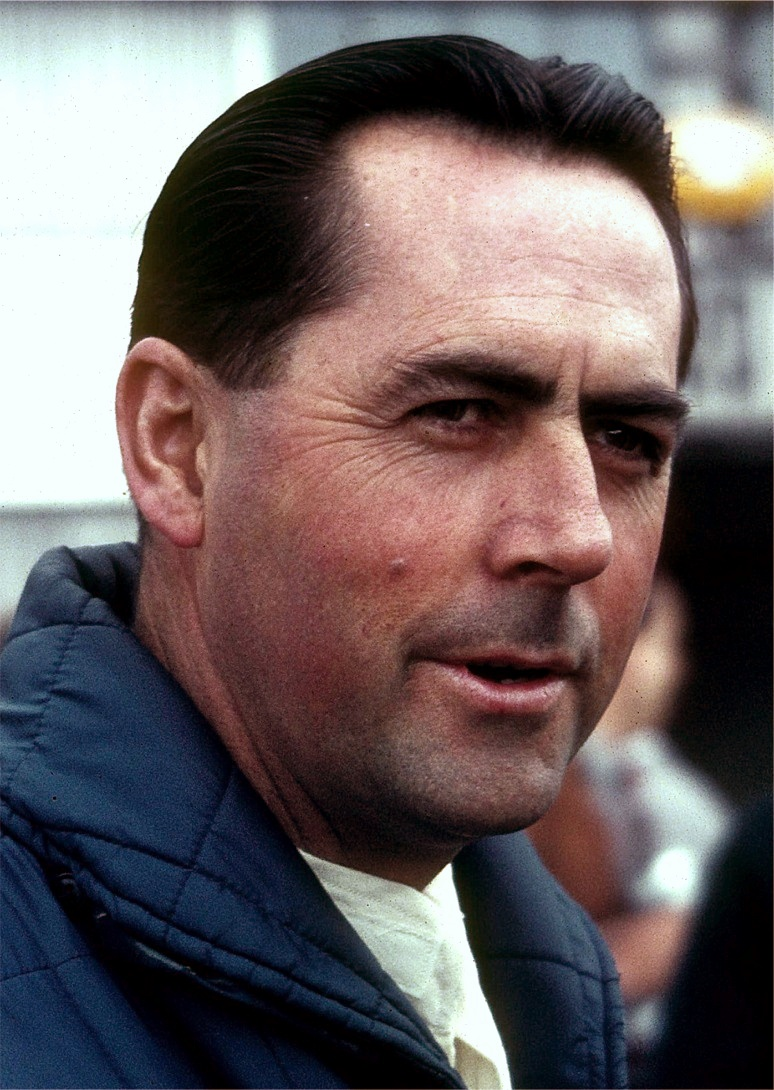
Australian Jack Brabham (pictured in 1966) won the second of his three Drivers' Championships, driving a Cooper-Climax.

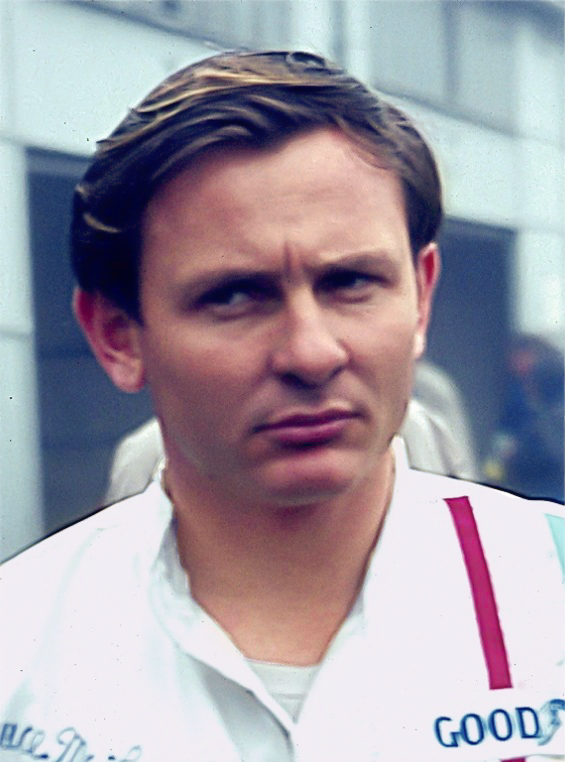
Bruce McLaren finished as runner-up in the World Drivers' Championship.

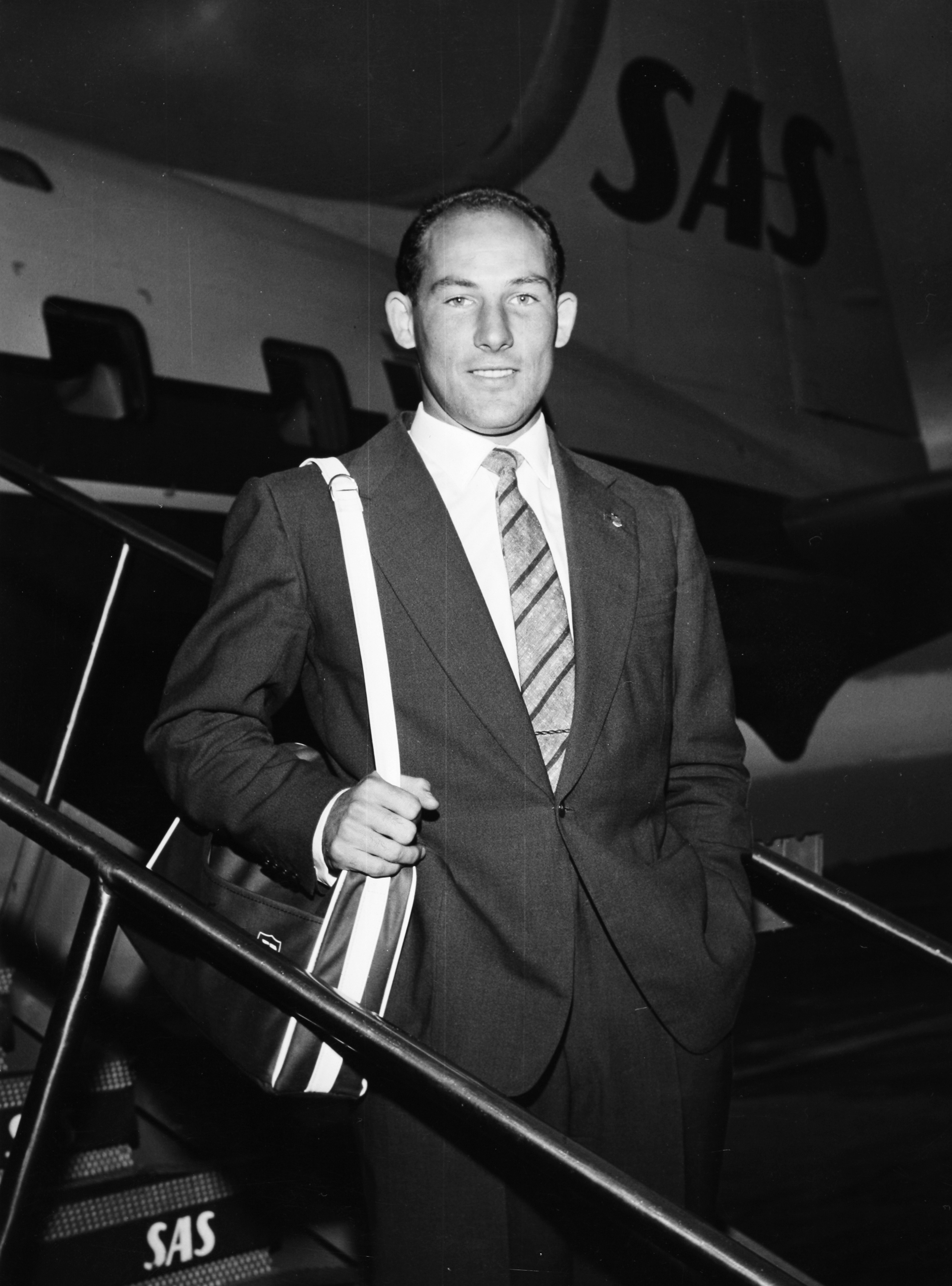
Stirling Moss finished third in the World Drivers' Championship.

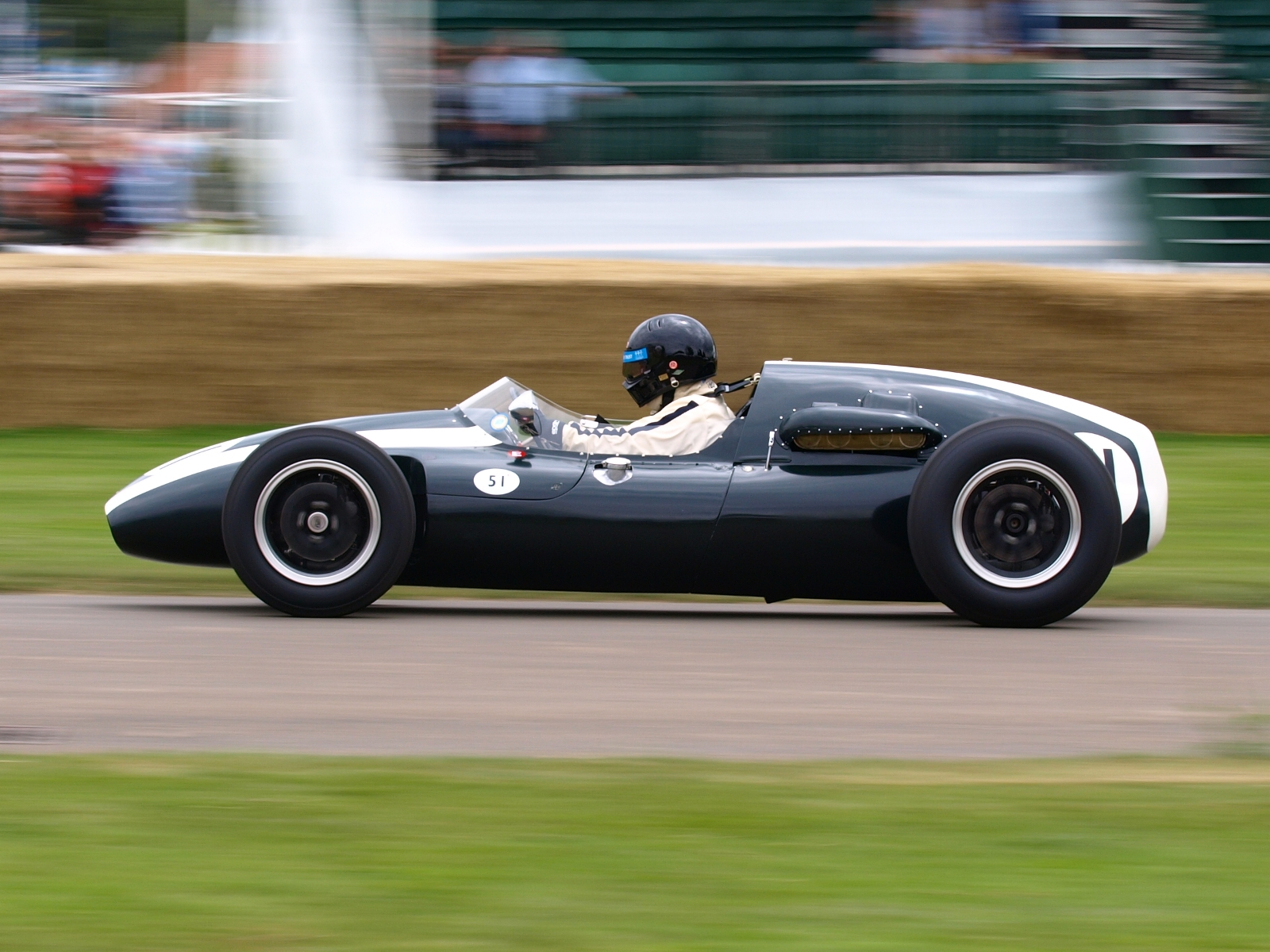
Cooper-Climax won the International Cup for F1 Manufacturers with the Cooper T51 & T53.

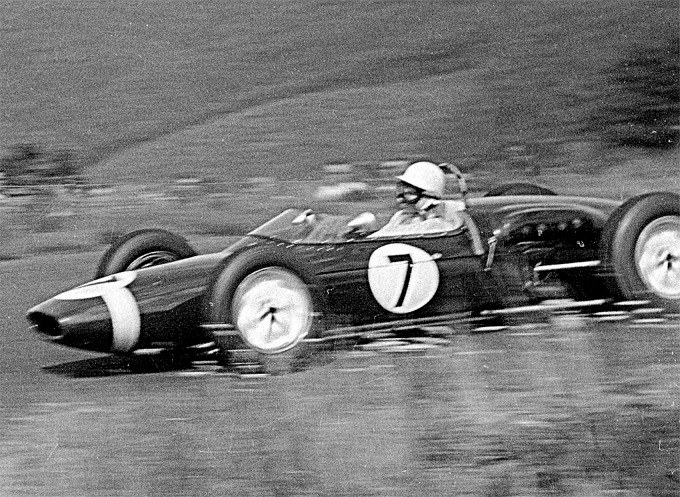
Lotus-Climax finished runner-up in the International Cup for F1 Manufacturers with the Lotus 16 & 18.

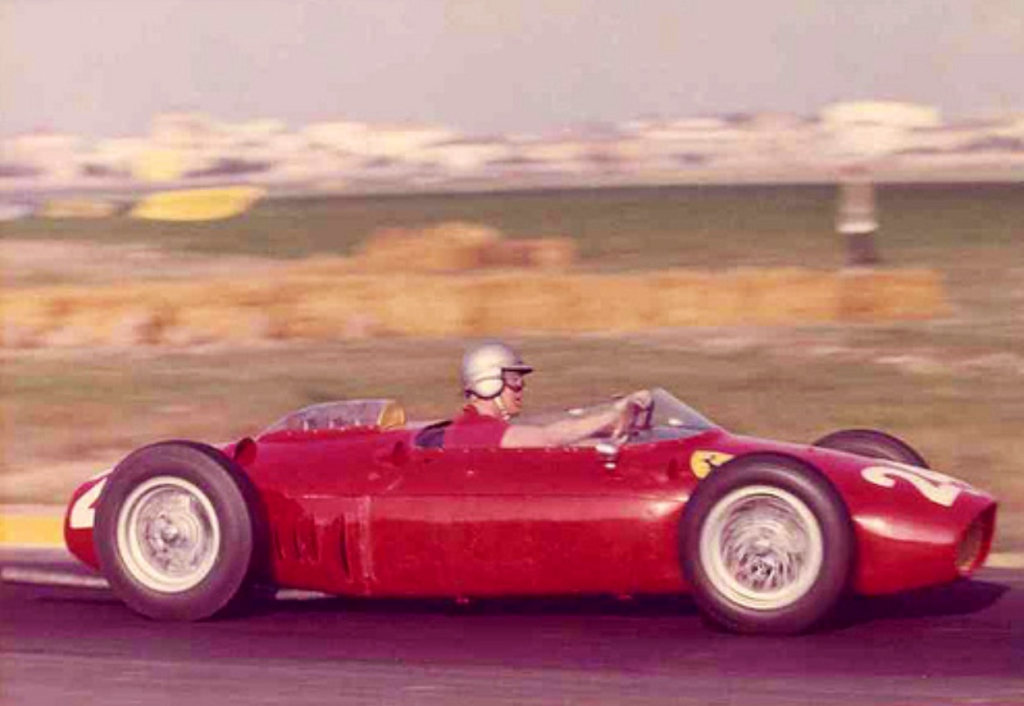
Ferrari finished third in the International Cup for F1 Manufacturers with the Ferrari 246 & 246 P.

The 1960 Formula One season was the 14th season of FIA Formula One motor racing. It featured the 11th World Championship of Drivers, the third International Cup for F1 Manufacturers and five non-championship Formula One races. The World Championship was contested over ten races between 7 February and 20 November 1960.

Jack Brabham driving for Cooper won his second consecutive Drivers' Championship. Cooper secured their second consecutive Manufacturers' title.

It was the last year of the 2.5 litre formula, the FIA mandating 1.5 litre engines from 1961 on. Rear-engined cars (from Cooper, Lotus, Porsche and BRM) were distinctly more successful than the front-engined designs (from Ferrari, Scarab and Aston Martin). Ferrari did win their home race when the British teams boycotted the event, opposing the organisers' decision to use the banked circuit. It was the last victory for a front-engined car in a World Championship race.

It was also the last season to include the Indianapolis 500.

Three drivers died in racing accidents: American Harry Schell during practice for the 1960 BRDC International Trophy, and Britons Chris Bristow and Alan Stacey, both killed at the Belgian Grand Prix at Spa-Francorchamps.

== Teams and drivers ==
The following teams and drivers competed in the 1960 FIA World Championship. All teams competed with tyres supplied by Dunlop.

| Entrant | Constructor | Chassis | Engine | Driver | Rounds |
|---|---|---|---|---|---|
| (United States) Camoradi International | Behra-Porsche-Porsche | RSK | Porsche 547/3 1.5 F4 | (United States) Masten Gregory | 1 |
| (United States) Camoradi International | Behra-Porsche-Porsche | RSK | Porsche 547/3 1.5 F4 | (United States) Fred Gamble | 9 |
| (Italy) Scuderia Centro Sud | Cooper-Maserati | T51 | Maserati 250S 2.5 L4 | (Argentina) Roberto Bonomi | 1 |
| (Italy) Scuderia Centro Sud | Cooper-Maserati | T51 | Maserati 250S 2.5 L4 | (Argentina) Carlos Menditeguy | 1 |
| (Italy) Scuderia Centro Sud | Cooper-Maserati | T51 | Maserati 250S 2.5 L4 | (United States) Masten Gregory | 2, 4, 6–8 |
| (Italy) Scuderia Centro Sud | Cooper-Maserati | T51 | Maserati 250S 2.5 L4 | (United Kingdom) Ian Burgess | 2, 6–7, 10 |
| (Italy) Scuderia Centro Sud | Cooper-Maserati | T51 | Maserati 250S 2.5 L4 | (France) Maurice Trintignant | 2, 4, 6, 10 |
| (Italy) Scuderia Centro Sud | Cooper-Maserati | T51 | Maserati 250S 2.5 L4 | (Portugal) Mário de Araújo Cabral | 8 |
| (Italy) Scuderia Centro Sud | Cooper-Maserati | T51 | Maserati 250S 2.5 L4 | (United States) Alfonso Thiele | 9 |
| (Italy) Scuderia Centro Sud | Cooper-Maserati | T51 | Maserati 250S 2.5 L4 | (West Germany) Wolfgang von Trips | 10 |
| (Italy) Giorgio Scarlatti | Maserati | 250F | Maserati 250F1 2.5 L6 | (Italy) Giorgio Scarlatti | 1 |
| (Argentina) Nasif Estéfano | Maserati | 250F | Maserati 250F1 2.5 L6 | (Argentina) Nasif Estéfano | 1 |
| (Spain) Antonio Creus | Maserati | 250F | Maserati 250F1 2.5 L6 | (Spain) Antonio Creus | 1 |
| (Italy) Gino Munaron | Maserati | 250F | Maserati 250F1 2.5 L6 | (Italy) Gino Munaron | 1 |
| (United Kingdom) Cooper Car Company | Cooper-Climax | T51; T53 | Climax FPF 2.5 L4 | (New Zealand) Bruce McLaren | 1–2, 4–8, 10 |
| (United Kingdom) Cooper Car Company | Cooper-Climax | T51; T53 | Climax FPF 2.5 L4 | (Australia) Jack Brabham | 1–2, 4–8, 10 |
| (United Kingdom) Cooper Car Company | Cooper-Climax | T51; T53 | Climax FPF 2.5 L4 | (United States) Chuck Daigh | 7 |
| (United Kingdom) Cooper Car Company | Cooper-Climax | T51; T53 | Climax FPF 2.5 L4 | (United Kingdom) Ron Flockhart | 10 |
| (United Kingdom) Team Lotus | Lotus-Climax | 18; 16 | Climax FPF 2.5 L4 | (United Kingdom) Innes Ireland | 1–2, 4–8, 10 |
| (United Kingdom) Team Lotus | Lotus-Climax | 18; 16 | Climax FPF 2.5 L4 | (United Kingdom) Alan Stacey | 1–2, 4–5 |
| (United Kingdom) Team Lotus | Lotus-Climax | 18; 16 | Climax FPF 2.5 L4 | (Argentina) Alberto Rodríguez Larreta | 1 |
| (United Kingdom) Team Lotus | Lotus-Climax | 18; 16 | Climax FPF 2.5 L4 | (United Kingdom) John Surtees | 2, 7–8, 10 |
| (United Kingdom) Team Lotus | Lotus-Climax | 18; 16 | Climax FPF 2.5 L4 | (United Kingdom) Jim Clark | 4–8, 10 |
| (United Kingdom) Team Lotus | Lotus-Climax | 18; 16 | Climax FPF 2.5 L4 | (United Kingdom) Ron Flockhart | 6 |
| (Italy) Scuderia Ferrari | Ferrari | 246 | Ferrari 155 2.4 V6 | (United Kingdom) Cliff Allison | 1–2 |
| (Italy) Scuderia Ferrari | Ferrari | 246 | Ferrari 155 2.4 V6 | (United States) Phil Hill | 1–2, 4–9 |
| (Italy) Scuderia Ferrari | Ferrari | 246 | Ferrari 155 2.4 V6 | (West Germany) Wolfgang von Trips | 1–2, 4–8 |
| (Italy) Scuderia Ferrari | Ferrari | 246 | Ferrari 155 2.4 V6 | (Argentina) José Froilán González | 1 |
| (Italy) Scuderia Ferrari | Ferrari | 246 | Ferrari 155 2.4 V6 | (United States) Richie Ginther | 4, 9 |
| (Italy) Scuderia Ferrari | Ferrari | 246 | Ferrari 155 2.4 V6 | (Belgium) Willy Mairesse | 5–6, 9 |
| (Italy) Scuderia Ferrari | Ferrari | 246 P | Ferrari 171 2.4 V6 | (United States) Richie Ginther | 2 |
| (Italy) Scuderia Ferrari | Ferrari | 246 P | Ferrari 1.5 V6 | (West Germany) Wolfgang von Trips | 9 |
| (France) Ecurie Bleue | Cooper-Climax | T51 | Climax FPF 2.2 L4 | (United States) Harry Schell | 1 |
| (United Kingdom) R.R.C. Walker Racing Team | Lotus-Climax | 18 | Climax FPF 2.5 L4 | (United Kingdom) Stirling Moss | 2, 4–5, 8, 10 |
| (United Kingdom) R.R.C. Walker Racing Team | Cooper-Climax | T51 | Climax FPF 2.5 L4 | (United Kingdom) Stirling Moss | 1 |
| (United Kingdom) R.R.C. Walker Racing Team | Cooper-Climax | T51 | Climax FPF 2.5 L4 | (France) Maurice Trintignant | 1 |
| (United Kingdom) R.R.C. Walker Racing Team | Cooper-Climax | T51 | Climax FPF 2.5 L4 | (United States) Lance Reventlow | 7 |
| (United Kingdom) Owen Racing Organisation | BRM | P25; P48 | BRM P25 2.5 L4 | (Sweden) Jo Bonnier | 1–2, 4–8, 10 |
| (United Kingdom) Owen Racing Organisation | BRM | P25; P48 | BRM P25 2.5 L4 | (United Kingdom) Graham Hill | 1–2, 4–8, 10 |
| (United Kingdom) Owen Racing Organisation | BRM | P25; P48 | BRM P25 2.5 L4 | (United States) Dan Gurney | 2, 4–8, 10 |
| (Venezuela) Ettore Chimeri | Maserati | 250F | Maserati 250F1 2.5 L6 | (Venezuela) Ettore Chimeri | 1 |
| (United Kingdom) Fred Tuck Cars | Cooper-Climax | T51 | Climax FPF 2.5 L4 | (United Kingdom) Bruce Halford | 2 |
| (United Kingdom) Fred Tuck Cars | Cooper-Climax | T51 | Climax FPF 2.5 L4 | (Belgium) Lucien Bianchi | 6–7 |
| (United Kingdom) High Efficiency Motors (United Kingdom) C.T. Atkins | Cooper-Climax | T51 | Climax FPF 2.5 L4 | (United Kingdom) Roy Salvadori | 2, 10 |
| (United Kingdom) High Efficiency Motors (United Kingdom) C.T. Atkins | Cooper-Climax | T51 | Climax FPF 2.5 L4 | (United Kingdom) Jack Fairman | 7 |
| (United Kingdom) Yeoman Credit Racing Team | Cooper-Climax | T51 | Climax FPF 2.5 L4 | (United Kingdom) Chris Bristow | 2, 4–5 |
| (United Kingdom) Yeoman Credit Racing Team | Cooper-Climax | T51 | Climax FPF 2.5 L4 | (United Kingdom) Tony Brooks | 2, 4–5, 7–8, 10 |
| (United Kingdom) Yeoman Credit Racing Team | Cooper-Climax | T51 | Climax FPF 2.5 L4 | (United Kingdom) Henry Taylor | 4, 6–8, 10 |
| (United Kingdom) Yeoman Credit Racing Team | Cooper-Climax | T51 | Climax FPF 2.5 L4 | (Belgium) Olivier Gendebien | 5–8, 10 |
| (United Kingdom) Yeoman Credit Racing Team | Cooper-Climax | T51 | Climax FPF 2.5 L4 | (United Kingdom) Bruce Halford | 6 |
| (United Kingdom) Yeoman Credit Racing Team | Cooper-Climax | T51 | Climax FPF 2.5 L4 | (United States) Phil Hill | 10 |
| (United Kingdom) J.B. Naylor | JBW-Maserati | 59 | Maserati 250S 2.5 L4 | (United Kingdom) Brian Naylor | 2, 7, 9–10 |
| (Italy) Scuderia Eugenio Castellotti | Cooper-Castellotti | T51 | Castellotti 2.5 L4 | (Italy) Gino Munaron | 6–7, 9 |
| (Italy) Scuderia Eugenio Castellotti | Cooper-Castellotti | T51 | Castellotti 2.5 L4 | (Italy) Giorgio Scarlatti | 2, 9 |
| (Italy) Scuderia Eugenio Castellotti | Cooper-Castellotti | T51 | Castellotti 2.5 L4 | (Italy) Giulio Cabianca | 9 |
| (United States) Reventlow Automobiles Inc. | Scarab | F1 | Scarab 2.5 L4 | (United States) Chuck Daigh | 2, 4–6, 10 |
| (United States) Reventlow Automobiles Inc. | Scarab | F1 | Scarab 2.5 L4 | (United States) Lance Reventlow | 2, 4–5 |
| (United States) Reventlow Automobiles Inc. | Scarab | F1 | Scarab 2.5 L4 | (United States) Richie Ginther | 6 |
| (United Kingdom) David Brown Corporation | Aston Martin | DBR4; DBR5 | Aston Martin RB6 2.5 L6 | (United Kingdom) Roy Salvadori | 4, 7 |
| (United Kingdom) David Brown Corporation | Aston Martin | DBR4; DBR5 | Aston Martin RB6 2.5 L6 | (France) Maurice Trintignant | 7 |
| (Netherlands) Ecurie Maarsbergen | Cooper-Climax | T51 | Climax FPF 1.5 L4 | (Netherlands) Carel Godin de Beaufort | 4 |
| (United Kingdom) Taylor-Crawley Racing Team | Lotus-Climax | 18 | Climax FPF 2.5 L4 | (United Kingdom) Mike Taylor | 5 |
| (Belgium) Equipe Nationale Belge | Cooper-Climax | T45 | Climax FPF 2.5 L4 | (Belgium) Lucien Bianchi | 5 |
| (United Kingdom) Vandervell Products | Vanwall | VW 11 | Vanwall 254 2.5 L4 | (United Kingdom) Tony Brooks | 6 |
| (United Kingdom) Robert Bodle Ltd | Lotus-Climax | 16 | Climax FPF 2.5 L4 | (United Kingdom) David Piper | 6–7 |
| (United Kingdom) Gilby Engineering | Cooper-Maserati | T45 | Maserati 250S 2.5 L4 | (United Kingdom) Keith Greene | 7 |
| (United Kingdom) Arthur Owen | Cooper-Climax | T45 | Climax FPF 2.2 L4 | (United Kingdom) Arthur Owen | 9 |
| (West Germany) Wolfgang Seidel | Cooper-Climax | T45 | Climax FPF 1.5 L4 | (West Germany) Wolfgang Seidel | 9 |
| (West Germany) Scuderia Colonia | Cooper-Climax | T43 | Climax FPF 1.5 L4 | (Italy) Piero Drogo | 9 |
| (United Kingdom) H.H. Gould | Maserati | 250F | Maserati 250F1 2.5 L6 | (United Kingdom) Horace Gould | 9 |
| (West Germany) Dr Ing F. Porsche KG (West Germany) Porsche System Engineering | Porsche | 718/2 | Porsche 547/3 1.5 F4 | (West Germany) Edgar Barth | 9 |
| (West Germany) Dr Ing F. Porsche KG (West Germany) Porsche System Engineering | Porsche | 718/2 | Porsche 547/3 1.5 F4 | (West Germany) Hans Herrmann | 9 |
| (United Kingdom) Equipe Prideaux/Dick Gibson | Cooper-Climax | T43 | Climax FPF 1.5 L4 | (United Kingdom) Vic Wilson | 9 |
| (United States) Joe Lubin | Maserati | 250F | Maserati 250S 2.5 L4 | (United States) Bob Drake | 10 |
| (United States) Jim Hall | Lotus-Climax | 18 | Climax FPF 2.5 L4 | (United States) Jim Hall | 10 |
| (United States) Fred Armbruster | Cooper-Ferrari | T51 | Ferrari 107 2.5 L4 | (United States) Pete Lovely | 10 |

- Note: The above table does not include drivers who only contested the World Championship race at Indianapolis and does not include teams that only contested that race.

=== Team and driver changes ===
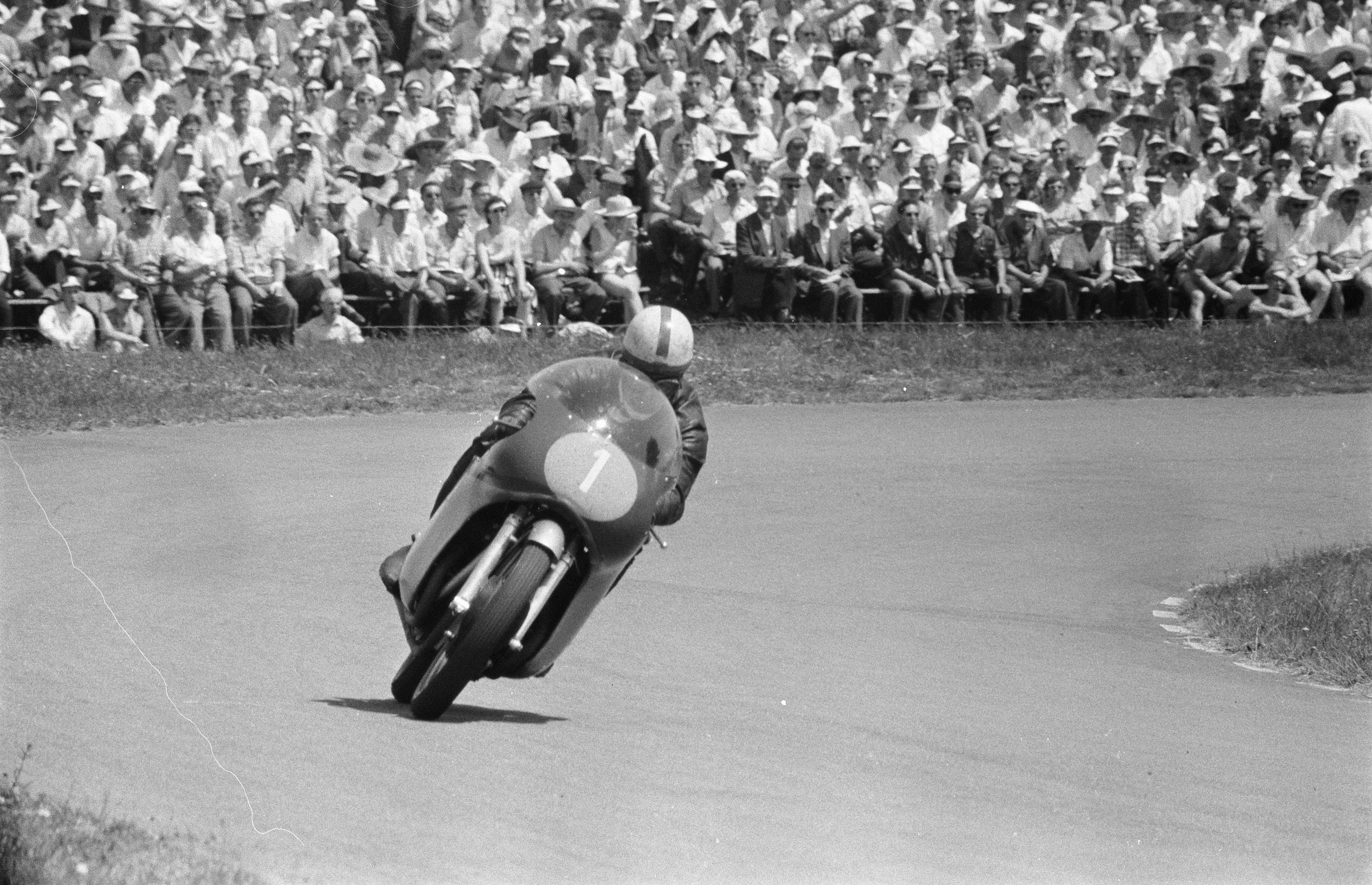
Successful motorcycle racing driver and future F1 champion John Surtees made his debut with Lotus.

- Ferrari's Dan Gurney moved to BRM and Tony Brooks moved to BRP (racing under Yeoman Credit Racing). Wolfgang von Trips was hired as their full-time driver for 1960.
- At BRP, Brooks would be partnered by Harry Schell from the second round on, were it not for the American's fatal accident during the 1960 BRDC International Trophy.
- Graham Hill moved from Lotus to BRM, so Colin Chapman hired John Surtees. The Brit was a very successful motorcycle racing driver, just switching to racing cars for the first time, but he would become a Formula One champion within five years.
- Carroll Shelby had driven for Aston Martin in Formula One and had won the 1959 24 Hours of Le Mans with largely the same team, but retired from driving in 1960. He opened a high-performance driving school and, later, the Shelby American company to create the famous AC Cobra sports car.
- Lance Reventlow brought a new constructor to the grid: Scarab. Chuck Daigh and Reventlow himself were the drivers. The front-engined cars turned out to be unreliable and off the pace compared to their rear-engined rivals, and 1960 would be their only season.

==== Mid-season changes ====
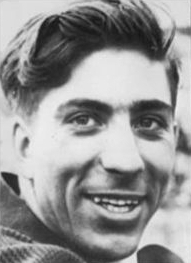
Alan Stacey died during the Belgian Grand Prix.

- Ferrari driver Cliff Allison suffered a major crash while practising for the Monaco Grand Prix, and it took him almost the rest of the year to recover from his injuries. He had slammed into a straw barrier and sustained a broken left arm, rib fractures, facial cuts, and a concussion. Later in the year, Belgian Willy Mairesse made his debut with the team.
- Alongside Innes Ireland and Alan Stacey, John Surtees made his debut with Lotus, but because of his commitments in the Isle of Man TT, their Formula Junior driver Jim Clark was promoted to the third F1 seat. When Surtees returned, both Clark and he became permanent drivers, since Stacey had suffered a tragic fatal accident earlier, in the Belgian Grand Prix.
- Chris Bristow was also killed in the Belgian Grand Prix. His seat at BRP was taken up by Henry Taylor and Olivier Gendebien. Together, they had already shared the second and third cars in the team. Taylor would later injure his arm in a heavy crash during practice for the Portuguese Grand Prix.
- Mike Taylor crashed during practice for the Belgian Grand Prix. The steering column weld failed and the car went off track. He was thrown out of the car and actually cut down a tree with his body. He broke several bones and was paralysed but was able to regain the ability to walk through therapy. He later successfully sued Lotus for supplying the faulty chassis.
- Finally, Stirling Moss was injured as well during practice for the Belgian Grand Prix. He missed three races during his recovery.

== Calendar ==
| Round | Grand Prix | Circuit | Date |
|---|---|---|---|
| 1 | Argentine Grand Prix | (Argentina) Autódromo Oscar Alfredo Gálvez, Buenos Aires | 7 February |
| 2 | Monaco Grand Prix | Circuit de Monaco, Monte Carlo | 29 May |
| 3 | Indianapolis 500 | (United States) Indianapolis Motor Speedway, Speedway | 30 May (Note: The Indianapolis 500 also counted towards the 1960 USAC Championship Car season, and was run for USAC Championship cars, but did not count towards the International Cup for F1 Manufacturers.) |
| 4 | Dutch Grand Prix | (Netherlands) Circuit Zandvoort, Zandvoort | 6 June |
| 5 | Belgian Grand Prix | (Belgium) Circuit de Spa-Francorchamps, Stavelot | 19 June |
| 6 | French Grand Prix | (France) Reims-Gueux, Gueux | 3 July |
| 7 | British Grand Prix | (United Kingdom) Silverstone Circuit, Silverstone | 16 July |
| 8 | Portuguese Grand Prix | (Portugal) Circuito da Boavista, Porto | 14 August |
| 9 | Italian Grand Prix | (Italy) Autodromo Nazionale di Monza, Monza | 4 September |
| 10 | United States Grand Prix | (United States) Riverside International Raceway, California | 20 November |

=== Calendar changes ===
- The Argentine Grand Prix returned to the calendar. The 1959 race was cancelled after local heroes Juan Manuel Fangio and José Froilán González had retired and local interest faded.
- The Belgian Grand Prix returned to the calendar, after the 1959 race had been cancelled because of a dispute over start money.
- The British Grand Prix was moved from Aintree to Silverstone, in keeping with the event-sharing arrangement between the two circuits. Likewise, the Portuguese Grand Prix was moved from Circuito de Monsanto to Circuito da Boavista.
- The United States Grand Prix was moved from Sebring to Riverside due to the promoters at Sebring barely breaking even in profits.
- The German Grand Prix was supposed to be held on the AVUS circuit in Berlin but was run as a Formula Two race at the Nürburgring, instead, due to safety concerns at AVUS.
- The Moroccan Grand Prix was originally scheduled for 1 October but it was cancelled due to monetary reasons.

== Regulation changes ==
The points-scoring system was changed, with the point for the fastest lap being dropped and a point given for sixth place. The best six scores counted towards the championship, increased from five from the previous season.

== Championship report ==
=== Race 1: Argentina ===
The teams came down to Argentina from Europe in February to start the 1960 season, having competed at the last round of the 1959 championship in Sebring, Florida, in the United States only two months previously. Stirling Moss was on pole position in Buenos Aires in his Rob Walker Cooper-Climax with Team Lotus driver Innes Ireland alongside, although he had been 1.6 seconds slower in qualifying. Completing the four-person front row were the BRMs of Hill and Jo Bonnier. The Lotus team had come out with an all-new mid-engined car, the 18, and were expected to be competitive.

At the start, Ireland made a fantastic start and had a good lead at the end of the first lap over Bonnier, Graham Hill, and Phil Hill (no relation to Graham), who had started from the second row in his Ferrari Dino 246. Moss made a poor start and was eighth at the end of the first lap. On the second lap, Ireland spun, and as he was doing this, Moss was driving a blinding lap, passing the Cooper of Carlos Menditeguy, Froilan Gonzalez's Ferrari, Jack Brabham's Cooper, Phil Hill's Ferrari, and Ireland's Lotus to run third behind Graham Hill and Bonnier. Moss passed Hill on lap ten and took the lead from Bonnier five laps later. The recovering Ireland also made dramatic progress, passing Brabham and Graham Hill to run third on lap 18. Bonnier attacked Moss for the lead and retook it on lap 21, but 15 laps later, Stirling was back ahead. On lap 42. he went out with a broken suspension. Bonnier was left nearly a lap ahead of everyone. Ireland was promoted to second, but both Graham Hill and Brabham retired, so Bruce McLaren was third. With 12 laps to go, Bonnier suffered engine trouble, and Ireland went into the lead only to have his gear-linkage jam, so he too slipped back, leaving McLaren to win. Cliff Allison was second for Ferrari, while Moss took over Maurice Trintignant's car to take third.

=== Race 2: Monaco ===
There had been a non-championship round at the Goodwood circuit near the southern English coast, the Glover Trophy, won by Innes Ireland in a Lotus. During this time, most drivers were competing in sportscar races, such as the 12 Hours of Sebring in March; and the Targa Florio and the Nurburgring 1000km in May.

Moss took pole by a second with Jack Brabham's Cooper and Chris Bristow's BRP Cooper alongside, while Jo Bonnier shared the second row with Tony Brooks's BRP Cooper. Bonnier took the lead at the start, with Brabham second and Moss third ahead of Brooks and Bristow in the BRP Coopers. Moss took Brabham on lap 5 and then shadowed Bonnier until lap 17, when he took the lead. Further back Bristow went out with gearbox trouble. Brabham passed Bonnier on lap 20, but the Swede fought back and, on lap 27, retook the position. The pattern of the race was turned upside-down when rain came. Brabham passed Bonnier and Moss to take the lead while Brooks spun back down the order, leaving McLaren in fourth place, battling with Phil Hill. After six laps in the lead, Brabham spun into the wall at Sainte Dévote, and Moss was back in the lead but had to pit to replace a plug-lead, so Bonnier was back ahead until Moss caught him. Bonnier went out with a broken suspension soon after, and G Hill crashed. This meant that McLaren finished second, with Phil Hill third and Brooks the only other survivor. Moss went on to win his 2nd Monaco Grand Prix from McLaren and Phil Hill.

=== Race 3: Indianapolis 500 ===
The Indy 500, on the World Championship calendar for the final time in 1960, was the only race not run to FIA regulations. Jim Rathmann won this race, which took place on a holiday-day Monday, in an Offenhauser-powered Watson chassis after a thrilling battle for the lead with Rodger Ward.

=== Race 4: Netherlands ===
Although there were disputes over prize money and several teams withdrew after qualifying, there was still a decent field for the race with Stirling Moss on pole position in his Walker Lotus-Climax. Jack Brabham was alongside in his Cooper-Climax, and Innes Ireland was on the outside of the front row in his factory Lotus 18. The BRMs of Jo Bonnier and Graham Hill shared the second row. Brabham made the best start and led Moss and Ireland with Team Lotus's Alan Stacey up from the third row on the grid and Phil Hill sixth in his Ferrari from the fourth row. Stacey passed Ireland on the second lap, but Innes soon took back the place while Bruce McLaren moved ahead of Phil Hill in his Cooper. He would retire early with a driveshaft problem. Dan Gurney moved into fifth in his BRM, but he crashed at the hairpin after a brake failure. A spectator in a prohibited area was killed. Jim Clark had made rapid progress in the early laps and took Gurney's fifth place behind his Lotus teammates Ireland and Stacey. On lap 17, Brabham's car threw up part of a curb, which hit Moss's car and caused a puncture and damage to the wheel hub. Moss had to pit for repairs. He drove a storming comeback. Up front, the order remained static until Graham Hill passed Clark, who retired soon afterwards with gearbox failure. Stacey would disappear with a similar problem, leaving Hill to finish third, just ahead of the charging Moss. The Ferraris of Phil Hill and Ritchie Ginther were fifth and sixth but were a lap behind the leaders.

=== Race 5: Belgium ===
The Belgian Grand Prix of 1960 was one of the most disastrous races in Formula 1 history, with the weekend claiming two drivers and two others suffering serious injuries in practice. This race, which took place at the second-fastest and perhaps the most dangerous circuit of the year, the Spa-Francorchamps circuit in the southern part of Belgium, saw two significant accidents on Friday, with Moss suffering an axle failure at the super-fast Burnenville corner and being thrown from the car in the ensuing crash. He broke both his legs. Formula 1 debutante Mike Taylor suffered a steering failure in his Lotus at the Holowell corner and crashed into trees beside the track suffering multiple injuries, which ended his career. Jack Brabham took pole position for Cooper, two and a half seconds faster than the older BRP-run Cooper of Tony Brooks, with Phil Hill's Ferrari sharing the front row. Behind them were the BRP Cooper of local hero Olivier Gendebien and Graham Hill's BRM. On race day, Brabham took the lead at the start, and he would lead from start to finish. Gendebien made an excellent start to be second but then faded, while Team Lotus's Innes Ireland moved up into second place, although he would disappear soon afterwards with clutch trouble. On lap 20, British BRP Cooper driver Chris Bristow, fighting for sixth with the Ferrari of Willy Mairesse, lost control at Malmedy and crashed. He was thrown from the car, landed in some barbed-wire fencing, and was decapitated. Within five laps, Briton Alan Stacey of Team Lotus was also dead, having been hit in the face by a bird near the Masta kink. He crashed, his car was launched off an embankment, landed in a field some 25 feet lower than the track, and burst into flames, with Stacey still in the car, where he burned to death. Brabham won the race while Bruce McLaren in the second works Cooper emerged to finish second, giving the company a 1–2 finish with Graham Hill third, but celebrations were muted. It would remain the blackest weekend in World Championship history until the 1994 San Marino Grand Prix.

=== Race 6: France ===
Three weeks after the disastrous Belgian Grand Prix, the World Championship contenders gathered at the super-fast straights of Reims. Stirling Moss was out of action. Tony Brooks had switched from the BRP Cooper team to try the new Vanwall VW11, while Team Lotus had hired Ron Flockhart to replace Alan Stacey. BRP had two new drivers in, Henry Taylor and Bruce Halford. In practice, both Scarabs blew their engines, so neither Lance Reventlow nor Chuck Daigh was able to race. Jack Brabham was on pole position by 1.4 seconds, with Phil Hill's Ferrari and Graham Hill's BRM sharing the front row. Behind them were Innes Ireland's factory Lotus 18 and the Ferrari of Willy Mairesse. At the start, Graham Hill was caught unprepared, and as he tried to get the BRM off the line, he was hit from behind by the Scuderia Centro Sud Cooper of Maurice Trintignant. There was also a collision between Brooks and Lucien Bianchi's outdated Cooper. The battle for the lead involved Brabham and Phil Hill, and the pair switched places lap after lap until Hill began to fade with transmission trouble. A similar problem took out third-placed Ferrari driver Wolfgang Von Trips, so Brabham was left out in front alone. Mairesse retired with a similar problem, and Ireland had to stop with a broken front suspension. Also retiring were the two surviving BRMS of Dan Gurney and Jo Bonnier disappeared with engine trouble. This left Gendebien in the BRP Cooper to take second, with Bruce McLaren third in the second factory Cooper and Taylor finishing fourth in his BRP Cooper; the company could boast a 1–2–3–4 finish. The Lotuses of Jim Clark and Flockhart finished fifth and sixth.

=== Race 7: Britain ===
Although there was only a fortnight between the French and British GPs, several changes occurred when the F1 circus arrived at Silverstone. The Vanwall VW11 did not re-appear: Tony Brooks went back to his BRP Cooper, and with both Scarabs having blown up at Reims, they were not present, although Chuck Daigh and Lance Reventlow shared a third factory Cooper, Daigh being faster and thus getting to race. Aston Martin showed up with DBR5s for Roy Salvadori and Maurice Trintignant. At the same time, motorcycle ace John Surtees re-appeared in a works Lotus, and there was the usual crop of British privateers, including Keith Greene in the Gilby Engineering Cooper-Maserati and Brian Naylor in his JBW-Maserati. Qualifying resulted in pole position for Jack Brabham, a second faster than Graham Hill's BRM, with Bruce McLaren's Cooper and Jo Bonnier's BRM making it a balanced front row. The start saw three cars stall: Graham Hill (his second race running) and the two BRP Coopers of Brooks and Henry Taylor. McLaren was second on the first lap but soon dropped behind Bonnier and the factory Lotus of Innes Ireland. Ireland then passed Bonnier to take second place. Graham Hill drove a storming race from the back of the field and worked his way back, passing Ireland for second after 37 laps and setting off after Brabham. To the crowd's delight, he caught him and, on lap 55, took the lead. Further back, Surtees displaced Ireland in third place. Hill had been suffering brake problems for some time, and on lap 72, he spun at Copse Corner and was out. Brabham took the lead and, five laps later, took the chequered flag with Surtees and Ireland second and third for Team Lotus.

=== Race 8: Portugal ===
With the German Grand Prix being cancelled after safety concerns and complaints about the general quality of the AVUS track in Berlin, there was a month between the British and Portuguese GPs. At the challenging and dangerous Boavista street circuit in Porto, Stirling Moss made his F1 comeback after being out of action since the disastrous Belgian GP in June. The only other change of note was that local hero Mario Cabral was found a drive in the second Scuderia Centro Sud Cooper-Maserati. In practice, Henry Taylor crashed his BRP Cooper heavily and injured his arm, while Jim Clark smashed up his Lotus in a rare crash. Despite the accident, pole position went to Team Lotus driver John Surtees, who edged out Dan Gurney's BRM by a few hundredths of a second. Jack Brabham was third quickest in his normally-dominant works Cooper. Moss put his Walker Lotus on the second row alongside Graham Hill's BRM. Brabham took the lead at the start, but Gurney quickly found a way ahead, and then Brabham went wide at one corner and dropped to sixth place. Moss emerged second, with Surtees and Phil Hill in his Ferrari fighting with him. After ten laps, Gurney dropped back with an oil leak, so Surtees took the lead with Moss in pursuit but had to stop because of spark plug problems and dropped to the back of the field. He was later disqualified for driving against the direction of the race while trying to get going after a spin. Brabham had a lively fight with Phil Hill until the American crashed, and this became the lead on lap 36 when Surtees went off because oil had leaked onto his pedals. Bruce McLaren came through to finish second to give Cooper another 1–2 result, with Clark finishing third in his cobbled-together Lotus. But this was to be the last Portuguese Grand Prix for 24 years – the race would not return until 1984.

=== Race 9: Italy ===
With the World Championship settled in favour of Jack Brabham and the Italian authorities deciding that the Italian Grand Prix would be held on the combined road and oval course at the Monza Autodrome near Milan (making it the fastest circuit of the year), all the big British teams boycotted the event, citing the fragility, extreme roughness and poor construction of the concrete banking and the field consisted of the works Ferraris, the Coopers of Scuderia Eugenio Castellotti and Scuderia Centro Sud and a few privateers. To increase the size of the field, Formula 2 cars were allowed, with Porsche turning up with a pair of 718s for Hans Herrmann and Edgar Barth.

The powerful Ferraris dominated, with Phil Hill sharing the front row with fellow American Ritchie Ginther and Willy Mairesse with a couple of Coopers on the second row. In the race, Ginther and Hill led while Mairesse was slowed by team orders to help tow a fourth Ferrari – an F2 car driven by Wolfgang Von Trips – away from the two Porsches. This allowed Giulio Cabianca to run third in his Castellotti Cooper. Mairesse eventually returned to third place while Hill passed early leader Ginther to win the race. Ferrari finished 1–2–3, but it was an irrelevant result given the competition.

Jack Brabham won his 2nd consecutive drivers' championship with one race to go as even if Bruce McLaren won at Riverside with Brabham out of the points, McLaren's 4th at Silverstone would be dropped and McLaren would be on 38 if that happened, 2 points behind Brabham.

=== Race 10: USA ===
The final World Championship event of the year took place in the United States 10 weeks after the penultimate event. Ferrari did not travel to the Riverside circuit just east of Los Angeles, California, but Phil Hill found a ride in a fourth BRP Cooper at his home circuit, and Wolfgang Von Trips found a ride in a Cooper-Maserati run by Scuderia Centro Sud. In the sunny and pleasant southern California weather, Ron Flockhart turned up in the third factory Cooper and Jim Hall made his F1 debut in a private Lotus 18 and Chuck Daigh re-appeared in one of Lance Reventlow's Scarabs. Moss, by then recovered from his early season injuries, took pole by 0.6 seconds from World Champion Jack Brabham and Dan Gurney in his BRM. Jo Bonnier's BRM shared the second row with Jim Clark's Lotus. Brabham made the best start and led Moss for the first four laps, but then he heard an explosion at the car's back end and pitted. He made two stops to try to solve the problem, which was traced to overflow petrol hitting the hot exhausts of the Climax engine. Moss moved into the lead when Brabham pitted, and he stayed ahead all the way to the chequered flag. Early on, he was chased by Gurney, but he went out with plug problems, and Bonnier followed, retiring from second with engine trouble. This left Innes Ireland to finish second for Team Lotus, with the second factory Cooper of Bruce McLaren third. Brabham finished fourth, a lap behind at the finish. Jim Hall drove an excellent race to run fourth, but he dropped to seventh at the end when his transmission failed, and he had to push the car to the finish line. This was the only Grand Prix ever held at the Riverside circuit; 12 Hours of Sebring promoter Alec Ulmann had again broken even on this event, just as he had at the previous year's American Grand Prix at Sebring. The US Grand Prix was moved to the Watkins Glen circuit in upstate New York on the other side of the country.

== Results and standings ==
=== Grands Prix ===
| Round | Grand Prix | Pole position | Fastest lap | Winning driver | Winning constructor | Tyre | Report |
|---|---|---|---|---|---|---|---|
| 1 | (Argentina) Argentine Grand Prix | (United Kingdom) Stirling Moss | (United Kingdom) Stirling Moss | (New Zealand) Bruce McLaren | (United Kingdom) Cooper-Climax | D | Report |
| 2 | Monaco Grand Prix | (United Kingdom) Stirling Moss | (New Zealand) Bruce McLaren | (United Kingdom) Stirling Moss | (United Kingdom) Lotus-Climax | D | Report |
| 3 | (United States) Indianapolis 500 | (United States) Eddie Sachs | (United States) Jim Rathmann | (United States) Jim Rathmann | (United States) Watson-Offenhauser | F | Report |
| 4 | (Netherlands) Dutch Grand Prix | (United Kingdom) Stirling Moss | (United Kingdom) Stirling Moss | (Australia) Jack Brabham | (United Kingdom) Cooper-Climax | D | Report |
| 5 | (Belgium) Belgian Grand Prix | (Australia) Jack Brabham | (Australia) Jack Brabham (United Kingdom) Innes Ireland (United States) Phil Hill | (Australia) Jack Brabham | (United Kingdom) Cooper-Climax | D | Report |
| 6 | (France) French Grand Prix | (Australia) Jack Brabham | (Australia) Jack Brabham | (Australia) Jack Brabham | (United Kingdom) Cooper-Climax | D | Report |
| 7 | (United Kingdom) British Grand Prix | (Australia) Jack Brabham | (United Kingdom) Graham Hill | (Australia) Jack Brabham | (United Kingdom) Cooper-Climax | D | Report |
| 8 | (Portugal) Portuguese Grand Prix | (United Kingdom) John Surtees | (United Kingdom) John Surtees | (Australia) Jack Brabham | (United Kingdom) Cooper-Climax | D | Report |
| 9 | (Italy) Italian Grand Prix | (United States) Phil Hill | (United States) Phil Hill | (United States) Phil Hill | (Italy) Ferrari | D | Report |
| 10 | United States Grand Prix | (United Kingdom) Stirling Moss | (Australia) Jack Brabham | (United Kingdom) Stirling Moss | (United Kingdom) Lotus-Climax | D | Report |

=== Scoring system ===
Points were awarded to the top six classified finishers. Only the best six results counted towards the championship. This was the first season in which points for fastest laps were not awarded. No points were awarded for shared drives.

The International Cup for F1 Manufacturers only counted the points of the highest-finishing driver for each race. Indy 500 results did not count towards the cup. Additionally, like the Drivers' Championship, only the best six results counted towards the cup.

Numbers without parentheses are championship points; numbers in parentheses are total points scored. Points were awarded in the following system:

| Position | 1st | 2nd | 3rd | 4th | 5th | 6th |
|---|---|---|---|---|---|---|
| Race | 8 | 6 | 4 | 3 | 2 | 1 |

=== World Drivers' Championship standings ===
| Pos. | Driver | ARG (Argentina) | MON (Monaco) | 500 (United States) | NED (Netherlands) | BEL (Belgium) | FRA (France) | GBR (United Kingdom) | POR (Portugal) | ITA (Italy) | USA (United States) | Pts. (Note: Only the best 6 results counted towards the championship. Numbers without parentheses are championship points; numbers in parentheses are total points scored.) |
|---|---|---|---|---|---|---|---|---|---|---|---|---|
| 1 | (Australia) Jack Brabham | Ret | DSQ | | 1 | 1^{P}^{F} | 1^{P}^{F} | 1^{P} | 1 | | 4^{F} | 43 |
| 2 | (New Zealand) Bruce McLaren | 1 | 2^{F} | | Ret | 2 | 3 | (4) | 2 | | 3 | 34 (37) |
| 3 | (United Kingdom) Stirling Moss | 3† / NC^{P}^{F} | 1^{P} | | 4^{P}^{F} | DNS | | | DSQ | | 1^{P} | 19 |
| 4 | (United Kingdom) Innes Ireland | 6 | 9 | | 2 | Ret^{F} | 7 | 3 | 6 | | 2 | 18 |
| 5 | (United States) Phil Hill | 8 | 3 | | Ret | 4^{F} | 12 | 7 | Ret | 1^{P}^{F} | 6 | 16 |
| 6 | (Belgium) Olivier Gendebien | | | | | 3 | 2 | 9 | 7 | | 12 | 10 |
| 7 | (West Germany) Wolfgang von Trips | 5 | 8 | | 5 | Ret | 11 | 6 | 4 | 5 | 9 | 10 |
| 8 | (United States) Jim Rathmann | | | 1^{F} | | | | | | | | 8 |
| 9 | (United States) Richie Ginther | | 6 | | 6 | | DNS | | | 2 | | 8 |
| 10 | (United Kingdom) Jim Clark | | | | Ret | 5 | 5 | 16 | 3 | | 16 | 8 |
| 11 | (United Kingdom) Tony Brooks | | 4 | | Ret | Ret | Ret | 5 | 5 | | Ret | 7 |
| 12 | (United Kingdom) John Surtees | | Ret | | | | | 2 | Ret^{P}^{F} | | Ret | 6 |
| 13 | (United Kingdom) Cliff Allison | 2 | DNQ | | | | | | | | | 6 |
| 14 | (United States) Rodger Ward | | | 2 | | | | | | | | 6 |
| 15 | (United Kingdom) Graham Hill | Ret | 7 | | 3 | Ret | Ret | Ret^{F} | Ret | | Ret | 4 |
| 16 | (Belgium) Willy Mairesse | | | | | Ret | Ret | | | 3 | | 4 |
| 17 | (United States) Paul Goldsmith | | | 3 | | | | | | | | 4 |
| 18 | (Sweden) Jo Bonnier | 7 | 5 | | Ret | Ret | Ret | Ret | Ret | | 5 | 4 |
| 19 | (United Kingdom) Henry Taylor | | | | 7 | | 4 | 8 | DNS | | 14 | 3 |
| 20 | (Argentina) Carlos Menditeguy | 4 | | | | | | | | | | 3 |
| 21 | (United States) Don Branson | | | 4 | | | | | | | | 3 |
| 22 | (Italy) Giulio Cabianca | | | | | | | | | 4 | | 3 |
| 23 | (United States) Johnny Thomson | | | 5 | | | | | | | | 2 |
| 24 | (Belgium) Lucien Bianchi | | | | | 6 | Ret | Ret | | | | 1 |
| 25 | (United Kingdom) Ron Flockhart | | | | | | 6 | | | | Ret | 1 |
| 26 | (United States) Eddie Johnson | | | 6 | | | | | | | | 1 |
| 27 | (West Germany) Hans Herrmann | | | | | | | | | 6 | | 1 |
| — | (France) Maurice Trintignant | 3† | Ret | | Ret | | Ret | 11 | | | 15 | 0 |
| — | (United States) Lloyd Ruby | | | 7 | | | | | | | | 0 |
| — | (West Germany) Edgar Barth | | | | | | | | | 7 | | 0 |
| — | (United States) Jim Hall | | | | | | | | | | 7 | 0 |
| — | (United Kingdom) Roy Salvadori | | Ret | | DNS | | | Ret | | | 8 | 0 |
| — | (United Kingdom) Bruce Halford | | DNQ | | | | 8 | | | | | 0 |
| — | (United States) Bob Veith | | | 8 | | | | | | | | 0 |
| — | (Netherlands) Carel Godin de Beaufort | | | | 8 | | | | | | | 0 |
| — | (Italy) Piero Drogo | | | | | | | | | 8 | | 0 |
| — | (United States) Masten Gregory | 12 | DNQ | | DNS | | 9 | 14 | Ret | | | 0 |
| — | (Argentina) Alberto Rodríguez Larreta | 9 | | | | | | | | | | 0 |
| — | (United States) Bud Tingelstad | | | 9 | | | | | | | | 0 |
| — | (West Germany) Wolfgang Seidel | | | | | | | | | 9 | | 0 |
| — | (United States) Dan Gurney | | NC | | Ret | Ret | Ret | 10 | Ret | | Ret | 0 |
| — | (United States) Chuck Daigh | | DNQ | | DNS | Ret | DNS | Ret | | | 10 | 0 |
| — | (United Kingdom) Ian Burgess | | DNQ | | | | 10 | Ret | | | Ret | 0 |
| — | (Argentina) José Froilán González | 10 | | | | | | | | | | 0 |
| — | (United States) Bob Christie | | | 10 | | | | | | | | 0 |
| — | (United States) Fred Gamble | | | | | | | | | 10 | | 0 |
| — | (Argentina) Roberto Bonomi | 11 | | | | | | | | | | 0 |
| — | (United States) Red Amick | | | 11 | | | | | | | | 0 |
| — | (United States) Pete Lovely | | | | | | | | | | 11 | 0 |
| — | (United Kingdom) David Piper | | | | | | Ret | 12 | | | | 0 |
| — | (United States) Duane Carter | | | 12 | | | | | | | | 0 |
| — | (Italy) Gino Munaron | 13 | | | | | Ret | 15 | | Ret | | 0 |
| — | (United Kingdom) Brian Naylor | | DNQ | | | | | 13 | | Ret | Ret | 0 |
| — | (United States) Bill Homeier | | | 13 | | | | | | | | 0 |
| — | (United States) Bob Drake | | | | | | | | | | 13 | 0 |
| — | (Argentina) Nasif Estéfano | 14 | | | | | | | | | | 0 |
| — | (United States) Gene Hartley | | | 14 | | | | | | | | 0 |
| — | (United States) Chuck Stevenson | | | 15 | | | | | | | | 0 |
| — | (United States) Bobby Grim | | | 16 | | | | | | | | 0 |
| — | (United Kingdom) Alan Stacey | Ret | Ret | | Ret | Ret | | | | | | 0 |
| — | (United Kingdom) Chris Bristow | | Ret | | Ret | Ret | | | | | | 0 |
| — | (Italy) Giorgio Scarlatti | Ret | DNQ | | | | | | | Ret | | 0 |
| — | (United States) Lance Reventlow | | DNQ | | DNS | Ret | | DNS | | | | 0 |
| — | (United States) Harry Schell | Ret | | | | | | | | | | 0 |
| — | (Venezuela) Ettore Chimeri | Ret | | | | | | | | | | 0 |
| — | (Spain) Antonio Creus | Ret | | | | | | | | | | 0 |
| — | (United States) Shorty Templeman | | | Ret | | | | | | | | 0 |
| — | (United States) Jim Hurtubise | | | Ret | | | | | | | | 0 |
| — | (United States) Jimmy Bryan | | | Ret | | | | | | | | 0 |
| — | (United States) Troy Ruttman | | | Ret | | | | | | | | 0 |
| — | (United States) Eddie Sachs | | | Ret^{P} | | | | | | | | 0 |
| — | (United States) Don Freeland | | | Ret | | | | | | | | 0 |
| — | (United States) Tony Bettenhausen | | | Ret | | | | | | | | 0 |
| — | (United States) Wayne Weiler | | | Ret | | | | | | | | 0 |
| — | (United States) A. J. Foyt | | | Ret | | | | | | | | 0 |
| — | (United States) Eddie Russo | | | Ret | | | | | | | | 0 |
| — | (United States) Johnny Boyd | | | Ret | | | | | | | | 0 |
| — | (United States) Gene Force | | | Ret | | | | | | | | 0 |
| — | (United States) Jim McWithey | | | Ret | | | | | | | | 0 |
| — | (United States) Len Sutton | | | Ret | | | | | | | | 0 |
| — | (United States) Dick Rathmann | | | Ret | | | | | | | | 0 |
| — | (United States) Al Herman | | | Ret | | | | | | | | 0 |
| — | (United States) Dempsey Wilson | | | Ret | | | | | | | | 0 |
| — | (United Kingdom) Jack Fairman | | | | | | | Ret | | | | 0 |
| — | (United Kingdom) Keith Greene | | | | | | | Ret | | | | 0 |
| — | (Portugal) Mario de Araujo Cabral | | | | | | | | Ret | | | 0 |
| — | (United States) Alfonso Thiele | | | | | | | | | Ret | | 0 |
| — | (United Kingdom) Vic Wilson | | | | | | | | | Ret | | 0 |
| — | (United Kingdom) Arthur Owen | | | | | | | | | Ret | | 0 |
| — | (United Kingdom) Mike Taylor | | | | | DNS | | | | | | 0 |
| — | (United Kingdom) Horace Gould | | | | | | | | | DNS | | 0 |
| Pos. | Driver | ARG (Argentina) | MON (Monaco) | 500 (United States) | NED (Netherlands) | BEL (Belgium) | FRA (France) | GBR (United Kingdom) | POR (Portugal) | ITA (Italy) | USA (United States) | Pts. |

Key
| Colour | Result |
|---|---|
| Gold | Winner |
| Silver | Second place |
| Bronze | Third place |
| Green | Other points position |
| Blue | Other classified position |
| Blue | Not classified, finished (NC) |
| Purple | Not classified, retired (Ret) |
| Red | Did not qualify (DNQ) |
| Black | Disqualified (DSQ) |
| White | Did not start (DNS) |
| White | Race cancelled (C) |
| Blank | Did not practice (DNP) |
| Blank | Excluded (EX) |
| Blank | Did not arrive (DNA) |
| Blank | Withdrawn (WD) |
| Blank | Did not enter (empty cell) |
| Annotation | Meaning |
| P | Pole position |
| F | Fastest lap |

- † Position shared between more drivers of the same car – no points awarded

=== International Cup for F1 Manufacturers standings ===
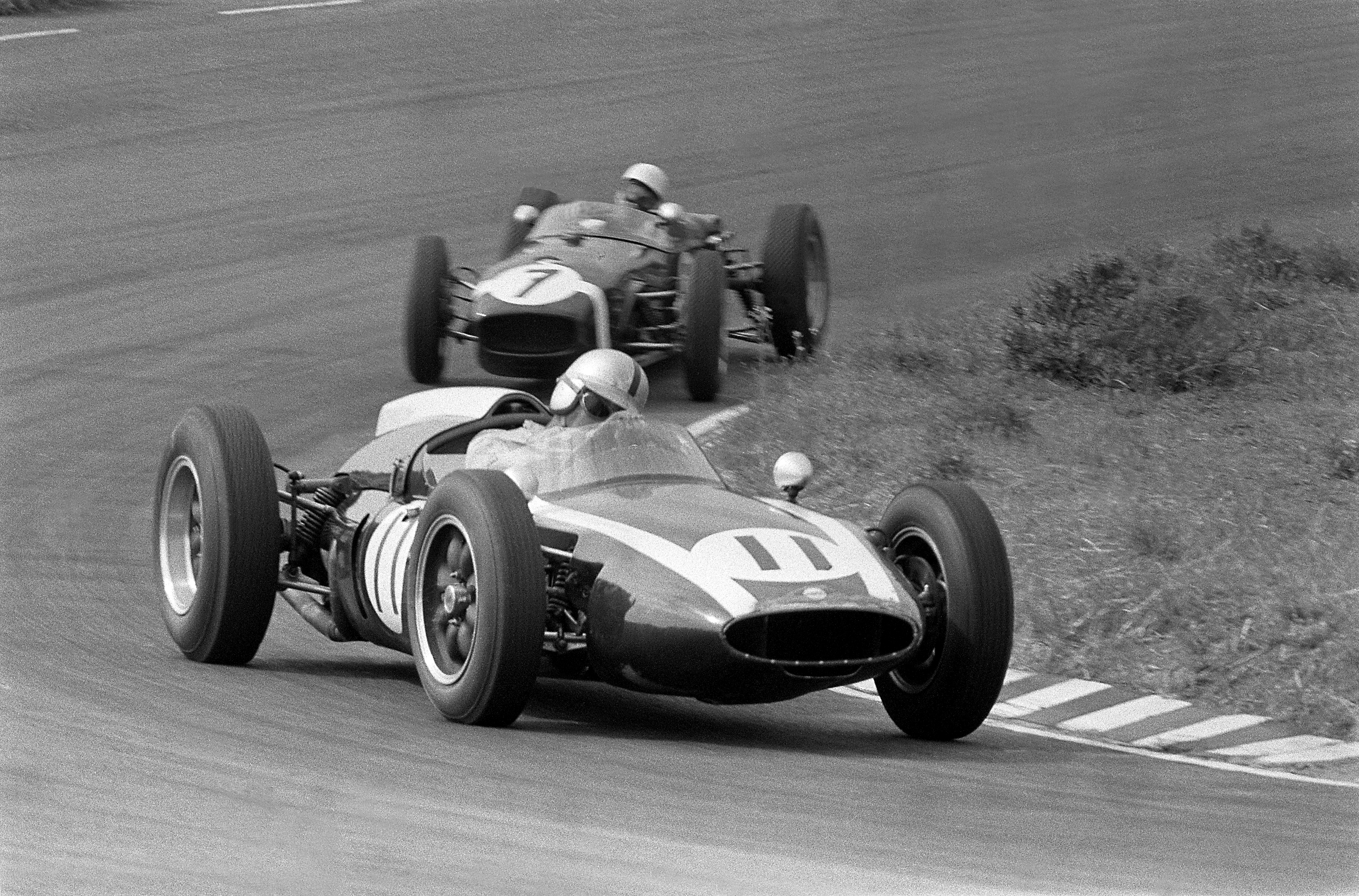
The International Cup for F1 Manufacturers was awarded to Cooper-Climax

| Pos. | Manufacturer | ARG (Argentina) | MON (Monaco) | NED (Netherlands) | BEL (Belgium) | FRA (France) | GBR (United Kingdom) | POR (Portugal) | ITA (Italy) | USA (United States) | Pts. |
|---|---|---|---|---|---|---|---|---|---|---|---|
| 1 | (United Kingdom) Cooper-Climax | 1 | (2) | 1 | 1 | 1 | 1 | 1 | 8 | (3) | 48 (58) |
| 2 | (United Kingdom) Lotus-Climax | (6) | 1 | 2 | 5 | (5) | 2 | 3 | | 1 | 34 (37) |
| 3 | (Italy) Ferrari | 2 | 3 | 5 | 4 | 11 | (6) | 4 | 1 | | 26 (27) |
| 4 | (United Kingdom) BRM | 7 | 5 | 3 | Ret | Ret | 10 | Ret | | 5 | 8 |
| 5 | (United Kingdom) Cooper-Maserati | 4 | Ret | Ret | | 9 | 14 | Ret | Ret | 9 | 3 |
| 6 | (United Kingdom) Cooper-Castellotti | | DNQ | | | Ret | 15 | | 4 | | 3 |
| 7 | (West Germany) Porsche | | | | | | | | 6 | | 1 |
| — | (France) Behra-Porsche-Porsche | 12 | | | | | | | 10 | | 0 |
| — | (United States) Scarab | WD | DNQ | DNS | Ret | DNS | | | | 10 | 0 |
| — | (United Kingdom) Aston Martin | | | DNS | | | 11 | | | | 0 |
| — | (United Kingdom) Cooper-Ferrari | | | | | | | | | 11 | 0 |
| — | (Italy) Maserati | 13 | | | | | | | DNS | 13 | 0 |
| — | (United Kingdom) JBW-Maserati | | DNQ | | | | 13 | | Ret | Ret | 0 |
| — | (United Kingdom) Vanwall | | | | | Ret | | | | | 0 |
| Pos. | Manufacturer | ARG (Argentina) | MON (Monaco) | NED (Netherlands) | BEL (Belgium) | FRA (France) | GBR (United Kingdom) | POR (Portugal) | ITA (Italy) | USA (United States) | Pts. |

- Bold results counted to championship totals.

== Non-championship races ==
Other Formula One races were held in 1960, which did not count towards the World Championship.

| Race Name | Circuit | Date | Winning driver | Constructor | Report |
|---|---|---|---|---|---|
| (United Kingdom) VIII Glover Trophy | Goodwood | 18 April | (United Kingdom) Innes Ireland | (United Kingdom) Lotus-Climax | Report |
| (United Kingdom) XII BRDC International Trophy | Silverstone | 14 May | (United Kingdom) Innes Ireland | (United Kingdom) Lotus-Climax | Report |
| (United Kingdom) V Silver City Trophy | Brands Hatch | 1 August | (Australia) Jack Brabham | (United Kingdom) Cooper-Climax | Report |
| (United Kingdom) I Lombank Trophy | Snetterton | 17 September | (United Kingdom) Innes Ireland | (United Kingdom) Lotus-Climax | Report |
| (United Kingdom) VII International Gold Cup | Oulton Park | 24 September | (United Kingdom) Stirling Moss | (United Kingdom) Lotus-Climax | Report |
