= Antonio Creus =

Spanish motorcycle racer (1924–1996)

- Born: Antonio Creus Rubín de Celis; 28 October 1924; Madrid, Spain
- Died: 19 February 1996 (aged 71); Madrid, Spain

Formula One World Championship career
- Nationality: (Spain) Spanish
- Active years: 1960
- Team: privateer Maserati
- Entries: 1
- Championships: 0
- Wins: 0
- Podiums: 0
- Career points: 0
- Pole positions: 0
- Fastest laps: 0
- First entry: 1960 Argentine Grand Prix

Antonio Creus i Rubín de Celis (28 October 1924 – 19 February 1996) was a motorcycle racer and racing driver from Spain. He participated in one Formula One World Championship Grand Prix, the 1960 Argentine Grand Prix on 7 February 1960, driving a privately entered Maserati 250F. He retired with electrical problems and exhaustion, and scored no championship points.

Creus died in his native Madrid in 1996.

== Complete Formula One World Championship results ==
(key)

Year	Entrant	Chassis	Engine	1	2	3	4	5	6	7	8	9	10	WDC	Points
1960	Antonio Creus	Maserati 250F	Maserati Straight-6	ARG; Ret	MON	500	NED	BEL	FRA	GBR	POR	ITA	USA	NC	0
