= 1960 Argentine Grand Prix =

← Previous race	Next race →
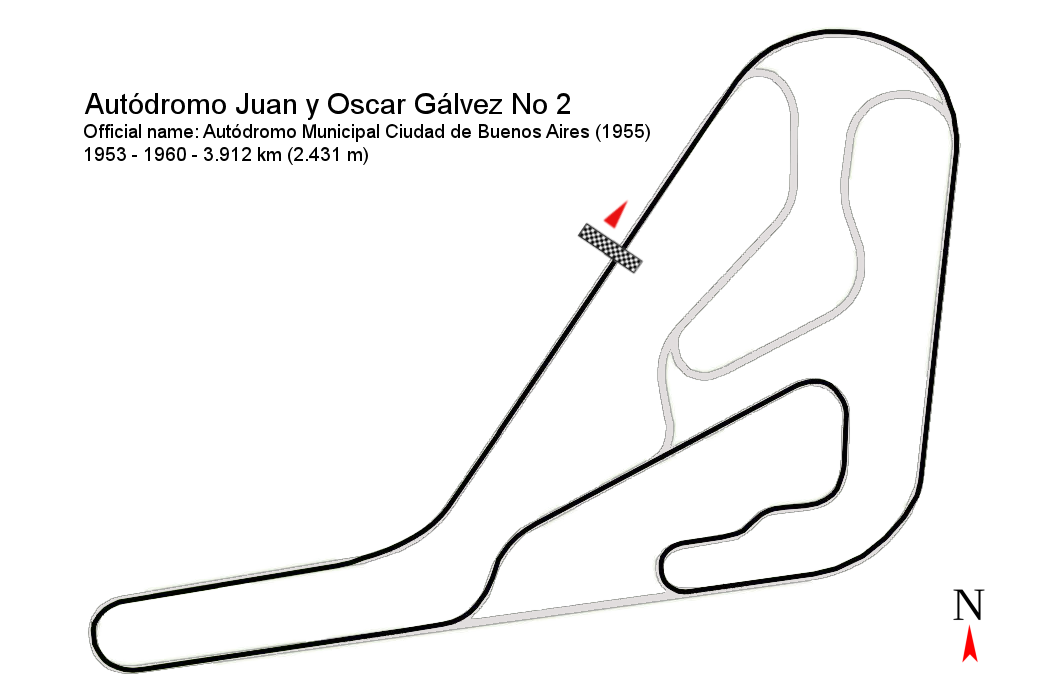

Race details
- Date: 7 February 1960
- Location: Autodromo Municipal Ciudad de Buenos Aires, Buenos Aires
- Course: Permanent racing facility
- Course length: 3.912 km (2.431 miles)
- Distance: 80 laps, 312.960 km (194.464 miles)
- Weather: Dry

Pole position
Driver	(United Kingdom) Stirling Moss	Cooper-Climax
- Time: 1:36.9

Fastest lap
Driver	(United Kingdom) Stirling Moss	Cooper-Climax
- Time: 1:38.9 on lap 37

Podium
First	(New Zealand) Bruce McLaren	Cooper-Climax
Second	(United Kingdom) Cliff Allison	Ferrari
Third	(France) Maurice Trintignant (United Kingdom) Stirling Moss	Cooper-Climax

The 1960 Argentine Grand Prix was a Formula One motor race held at Buenos Aires on 7 February 1960. It was race 1 of 10 in the 1960 World Championship of Drivers and race 1 of 9 in the 1960 International Cup for Formula One Manufacturers. This was the last Argentine Grand Prix until 1972, and the last to be held on the No. 4 configuration of the circuit.

The race was won by Bruce McLaren, his second consecutive victory, having won his first at Sebring at the end of the 1959 season. Stirling Moss suffered a suspension failure while leading, and took over Maurice Trintignant's Cooper, but was not awarded points for third place as a result of the shared drive, a rule that had been in place since 1958.

Venezuelan driver Ettore Chimeri participated in his only grand prix. He was killed two weeks later driving a Ferrari 250 TR in Havana. He was the first driver from his country in Formula One, and the last until Johnny Cecotto in 1983. It was the only grand prix appearances for Antonio Creus, Alberto Rodríguez Larreta and Roberto Bonomi. It was also the last grand prix appearances for the driver who scored Ferrari's first World Championship race victory, José Froilán González, and experienced American driver Harry Schell, who would be killed during practice for a non-championship race at Silverstone.

Three other local drivers took part in the practice sessions for the race. The Scuderia Centro Sud Maserati (No. 10) was driven in the first practice session by Pedro Llano, as well as by eventual race driver Nasif Estéfano and Rodriguez Larreta. In the second practice session, Julio Pola shared Chimeri's No. 44 Maserati. Also, Oscar Cabalén shared Estéfano's car in the qualifying session as a reserve driver.

== Classification ==
=== Qualifying ===
Pos	No	Driver	Constructor	Time	Gap
1	36	(United Kingdom) Stirling Moss	Cooper-Climax	1:36.9	—
2	20	(United Kingdom) Innes Ireland	Lotus-Climax	1:38.5	+1.6
3	42	(United Kingdom) Graham Hill	BRM	1:38.9	+2.0
4	40	(Sweden) Jo Bonnier	BRM	1:38.9	+2.0
5	30	(Germany) Wolfgang von Trips	Ferrari	1:39.2	+2.3
6	26	(United States) Phil Hill	Ferrari	1:39.3	+2.4
7	24	(United Kingdom) Cliff Allison	Ferrari	1:39.7	+2.8
8	38	(France) Maurice Trintignant	Cooper-Climax	1:39.9	+3.0
9	34	(United States) Harry Schell	Cooper-Climax	1:40.3	+3.4
10	18	(Australia) Jack Brabham	Cooper-Climax	1:40.6	+3.7
11	32	(Argentina) José Froilán González	Ferrari	1:41.0	+4.1
12	6	(Argentina) Carlos Menditeguy	Cooper-Maserati	1:41.8	+4.9
13	16	(New Zealand) Bruce McLaren	Cooper-Climax	1:41.8	+4.9
14	22	(United Kingdom) Alan Stacey	Lotus-Climax	1:43.6	+6.7
15	46	(Argentina) Alberto Rodríguez Larreta	Lotus-Climax	1:45.0	+8.1
16	2	(United States) Masten Gregory	Behra-Porsche-Porsche	1:45.5	+8.6
17	4	(Argentina) Roberto Bonomi	Cooper-Maserati	1:46.1	+9.2
18	8	(Italy) Giorgio Scarlatti	Maserati	1:46.1	+9.2
19	14	(Italy) Gino Munaron	Maserati	1:49.0	+12.1
20	10	(Argentina) Nasif Estéfano	Maserati	1:50.1	+13.2
21	44	(Venezuela) Ettore Chimeri	Maserati	1:50.5	+13.6
22	12	(Spain) Antonio Creus	Maserati	1:52.8	+15.9

=== Race ===
Pos	No	Driver	Constructor	Laps	Time/Retired	Grid	Points
1	16	(New Zealand) Bruce McLaren	Cooper-Climax	80	2:17:49.5	13	8
2	24	(United Kingdom) Cliff Allison	Ferrari	80	+ 26.3	7	6
3	38	(France) Maurice Trintignant (United Kingdom) Stirling Moss	Cooper-Climax	80	+ 36.9	8	0^{1}
4	6	(Argentina) Carlos Menditeguy	Cooper-Maserati	80	+ 53.3	12	3
5	30	(Germany) Wolfgang von Trips	Ferrari	79	+ 1 Lap	5	2
6	20	(United Kingdom) Innes Ireland	Lotus-Climax	79	+ 1 Lap	2	1
7	40	(Sweden) Jo Bonnier	BRM	79	+ 1 Lap	4	
8	26	(United States) Phil Hill	Ferrari	77	+ 3 Laps	6	
9	46	(Argentina) Alberto Rodríguez Larreta	Lotus-Climax	77	+ 3 Laps	15	
10	32	(Argentina) José Froilán González	Ferrari	77	+ 3 Laps	11	
11	4	(Argentina) Roberto Bonomi	Cooper-Maserati	76	+ 4 Laps	17	
12	2	(United States) Masten Gregory	Behra-Porsche-Porsche	76	+ 4 Laps	16	
13	14	(Italy) Gino Munaron	Maserati	72	+ 8 Laps	19	
14	10	(Argentina) Nasif Estéfano	Maserati	70	+ 10 Laps	20	
Ret	34	(United States) Harry Schell	Cooper-Climax	63	Fuel pump	9	
Ret	18	(Australia) Jack Brabham	Cooper-Climax	42	Gearbox	10	
Ret	36	(United Kingdom) Stirling Moss	Cooper-Climax	40	Suspension	1	
Ret	42	(United Kingdom) Graham Hill	BRM	37	Overheating	3	
Ret	22	(United Kingdom) Alan Stacey	Lotus-Climax	24	Physical	14	
Ret	44	(Venezuela) Ettore Chimeri	Maserati	23	Physical	21	
Ret	12	(Spain) Antonio Creus	Maserati	16	Physical	22	
Ret	8	(Italy) Giorgio Scarlatti	Maserati	11	Overheating	18	
DNS	10	(Argentina) Oscar Cabalén	Maserati			–	
DNS	10	(Argentina) Pedro Llano	Maserati			–	
DNS	44	(Argentina) Julio Pola	Maserati			–	

Notes

- ^1 – Trintignant and Moss received no points for the shared drive

== Championship standings after the race ==
Drivers' Championship standings

Pos	Driver	Points
1	(New Zealand) Bruce McLaren	8
2	(United Kingdom) Cliff Allison	6
3	(Argentina) Carlos Menditeguy	3
4	(Germany) Wolfgang von Trips	2
5	(United Kingdom) Innes Ireland	1

Constructors' Championship standings

Pos	Constructor	Points
1	(United Kingdom) Cooper-Climax	8
2	(Italy) Ferrari	6
3	(United Kingdom) Cooper-Maserati	3
4	(United Kingdom) Lotus-Climax	1

- Notes: Only the top five positions are included for both sets of standings.

Previous race: 1959 United States Grand Prix	FIA Formula One World Championship; 1960 season	Next race: 1960 Monaco Grand Prix
Previous race: 1958 Argentine Grand Prix	Argentine Grand Prix	Next race: 1971 Argentine Grand Prix
