= 1960 Monaco Grand Prix =

Coordinates: 43°44′4.74″N 7°25′16.8″E

← Previous race	Next race →

Race details
- Date: 29 May 1960
- Official name: XVIII Grand Prix Automobile de Monaco
- Location: Circuit de Monaco, Monte Carlo, Monaco
- Course: Street Circuit
- Course length: 3.145 km (1.954 miles)
- Distance: 100 laps, 314.500 km (195.400 miles)

Pole position
Driver	(United Kingdom) Stirling Moss	Lotus-Climax
- Time: 1:36.3

Fastest lap
Driver	(New Zealand) Bruce McLaren	Cooper-Climax
- Time: 1:36.2

Podium
First	(United Kingdom) Stirling Moss	Lotus-Climax
Second	(New Zealand) Bruce McLaren	Cooper-Climax
Third	(United States) Phil Hill	Ferrari

The 1960 Monaco Grand Prix was a Formula One motor race held at Monaco on 29 May 1960. It was race 2 of 10 in the 1960 World Championship of Drivers and race 2 of 9 in the 1960 International Cup for Formula One Manufacturers.

The race was won by Stirling Moss in a Lotus 18 entered by the R.R.C Walker Racing Team. It was the first World Championship F1 victory and pole position for the marque.

== Classification ==
=== Qualifying ===
Pos	No	Driver	Constructor	Time	Gap
1	28	(United Kingdom) Stirling Moss	Lotus-Climax	1:36.3	—
2	8	(Australia) Jack Brabham	Cooper-Climax	1:37.3	+1.0
3	18	(United Kingdom) Tony Brooks	Cooper-Climax	1:37.7	+1.4
4	16	(United Kingdom) Chris Bristow	Cooper-Climax	1:37.7	+1.4
5	2	(Sweden) Jo Bonnier	BRM	1:37.7	+1.4
6	6	(United Kingdom) Graham Hill	BRM	1:38.0	+1.7
7	22	(United Kingdom) Innes Ireland	Lotus-Climax	1:38.2	+1.9
8	38	(Germany) Wolfgang von Trips	Ferrari	1:38.3	+2.0
9	34	(United States) Richie Ginther	Ferrari	1:38.6	+2.3
10	36	(United States) Phil Hill	Ferrari	1:38.6	+2.3
11	10	(New Zealand) Bruce McLaren	Cooper-Climax	1:38.6	+2.3
12	14	(United Kingdom) Roy Salvadori	Cooper-Climax	1:38.7	+2.4
13	24	(United Kingdom) Alan Stacey	Lotus-Climax	1:38.9	+2.6
14	4	(United States) Dan Gurney	BRM	1:38.9	+2.6
15	26	(United Kingdom) John Surtees	Lotus-Climax	1:39.0	+2.7
16	44	(France) Maurice Trintignant	Cooper-Maserati	1:39.1	+2.8
DNQ	12	(United Kingdom) Bruce Halford	Cooper-Climax	1:39.6	+3.3
DNQ	32	(United Kingdom) Cliff Allison	Ferrari	1:39.7	+3.4
DNQ	20	(United Kingdom) Brian Naylor	JBW-Maserati	1:40.3	+4.0
DNQ	40	(United States) Masten Gregory	Cooper-Maserati	1:41.6	+5.3
DNQ	46	(United States) Chuck Daigh	Scarab	1:47.0	+10.7
DNQ	30	(Italy) Giorgio Scarlatti	Cooper-Castellotti	1:47.4	+11.1
DNQ	48	(United States) Lance Reventlow	Scarab	1:48.5	+12.2
DNQ	42	(United Kingdom) Ian Burgess	Cooper-Maserati	1:49.1	+12.8

=== Race ===
Pos	No	Driver	Constructor	Laps	Time/Retired	Grid	Points
1	28	(United Kingdom) Stirling Moss	Lotus-Climax	100	2:53:45.5	1	8
2	10	(New Zealand) Bruce McLaren	Cooper-Climax	100	+ 52.1	11	6
3	36	(United States) Phil Hill	Ferrari	100	+ 1:01.9	10	4
4	18	(United Kingdom) Tony Brooks	Cooper-Climax	99	+ 1 Lap	3	3
5	2	(Sweden) Jo Bonnier	BRM	83	+ 17 Laps	5	2
6	34	(United States) Richie Ginther	Ferrari	70	+ 30 Laps	9	1
7	6	(United Kingdom) Graham Hill	BRM	66	Spun Off	6	
8	38	(Germany) Wolfgang von Trips	Ferrari	61	Clutch	8	
9	22	(United Kingdom) Innes Ireland	Lotus-Climax	56	+ 44 Laps	7	
Ret	4	(United States) Dan Gurney	BRM	44	Suspension	14	
DSQ	8	(Australia) Jack Brabham	Cooper-Climax	40	Outside assistance	2	
Ret	14	(United Kingdom) Roy Salvadori	Cooper-Climax	29	Overheating	12	
Ret	24	(United Kingdom) Alan Stacey	Lotus-Climax	23	Chassis	13	
Ret	16	(United Kingdom) Chris Bristow	Cooper-Climax	17	Gearbox	4	
Ret	26	(United Kingdom) John Surtees	Lotus-Climax	17	Transmission	15	
Ret	44	(France) Maurice Trintignant	Cooper-Maserati	4	Gearbox	16	
DNQ	12	(United Kingdom) Bruce Halford	Cooper-Climax				
DNQ	32	(United Kingdom) Cliff Allison	Ferrari				
DNQ	20	(United Kingdom) Brian Naylor	JBW-Maserati				
DNQ	40	(United States) Masten Gregory	Cooper-Maserati				
DNQ	46	(United States) Chuck Daigh	Scarab				
DNQ	30	(Italy) Giorgio Scarlatti	Cooper-Castellotti				
DNQ	48	(United States) Lance Reventlow	Scarab				
DNQ	42	(United Kingdom) Ian Burgess	Cooper-Maserati				

== Notes ==
- This was the Formula One World Championship debut race for Lance Reventlow, future Formula One Grand Prix winner Richie Ginther and seven-time Grand Prix motorcycle World Champion and future Formula One World Champion John Surtees.
- It was also the first Formula One World Championship pole position and Grand Prix win for Lotus. Secondly, Scarab made its debut in Formula One in this race as both a constructor and engine supplier.
- Italian engine supplier Castellotti made its debut as well in the Formula One World Championship.
- This was the third Monaco Grand Prix win for a Coventry Climax-powered car. It therefore broke the previous record set by Maserati at the 1957 Monaco Grand Prix.

== Championship standings after the race ==
Drivers' Championship standings

	Pos	Driver	Points
	1	(New Zealand) Bruce McLaren	14
4	2	(United Kingdom) Stirling Moss	8
1	3	(United Kingdom) Cliff Allison	6
5	4	(United States) Phil Hill	4
2	5	(Argentina) Carlos Menditeguy	3

Constructors' Championship standings

	Pos	Constructor	Points
	1	(United Kingdom) Cooper-Climax	14
	2	(Italy) Ferrari	10
1	3	(United Kingdom) Lotus-Climax	9
1	4	(United Kingdom) Cooper-Maserati	3
	5	(United Kingdom) BRM	2

- Notes: Only the top five positions are included for both sets of standings.

Previous race: 1960 Argentine Grand Prix	FIA Formula One World Championship; 1960 season	Next race: 1960 Indianapolis 500
Previous race: 1959 Monaco Grand Prix	Monaco Grand Prix	Next race: 1961 Monaco Grand Prix
