= Bologna-Raticosa Hill Climb =

Bologna-Raticosa Hill Climb Cronoscalata Bologna-Raticosa
- Venue: Italy
- First race: 1926 (100 years ago)
- Last race: 2026
- Distance: 43.20 km (long); 32.72 km (short)
- Laps: One

Circuit information
- Turns: 603

The Bologna-Raticosa Hill Climb, one of the most challenging hill climbs in Italy and Europe, is the longest-running uphill automobile race in the world. The event is reserved for categories Turismo, Gran Turismo, Sport and Sport Prototypes.

The first race took place on a shorter 27 km route and was run on 3 October 1926 on the Rastignano-Loiano route. Antonio Testi won in a Diatto car with an average speed of 67.254 km/h.

The second race took place on a longer route of 43.501 km, on 7 May 1939, on the Rastignano-Passo della Raticosa section (elimination race of the “Volante Argento”). Enzo Seragnoli won in a Lancia Aprilia with an average speed of 84.082 km/h.

The third race took place on the longest route 47,600 km from San Ruffillo (Ponte sul Savena) - Passo della Raticosa, a route that will never be repeated so long, Giovanni Bracco win in a Ferrari 166 S with an average speed of 94,334 km/h in 27'28"3.

After the first three editions, from 1951 the route became 43.20 km route started from Via Toscana near the San Ruffillo bridge, on the outskirts of Bologna, to the Raticosa Pass made the race the second-longest hill climb in Europe after the Parma-Poggio di Berceto. From 1955 onwards, the hill climb was suspended for seven years, replaced between 1956 and 1958 by the shortest competition ever held in Italy, the 2,080 km Bologna-San Luca. The race resumed in 1962 with the 32.72 km short route with the start in front of the Bar Posta in Pianoro Vecchio. On 22 June 1969 was the last time the race was held.

Since 2001, historic cars have resumed racing on the Pianoro Vecchio – Livergnano stretch of 6.2 km until 2015. While since 2019, the race is a part of the Campionato di Velocità Salita Autostoriche (CIVSA). In 2025, the race was canceled due to bad weather. In 2026, the event, now in its 36th edition, will be confirmed as part of the Campionato di Velocità Salita Autostoriche (CIVSA) and will mark the 100th anniversary of the first edition.

Number	Edition	Date	Year	Drivers	Car	Manufacturers
1	–	3 October 1926	1926	(Italy) Antonio Testi	Diatto	(Italy) Diatto
2	–	7 May 1939	1939	(Italy) Enzo Seragnoli	Lancia Aprilia	(Italy) Lancia

== Bologna-Raticosa Hill Climb winners ==
Number	Edition	Year	Drivers	Car	Manufacturers
3	1	1950	(Italy) Giovanni Bracco	Ferrari 166 S	(Italy) Ferrari
4	2	1951	(Italy) Giulio Cabianca	OSCA MT4 (1,100 cc)	(Italy) Osca
5	3	1952	(Italy) Pietro Palmieri	Ferrari 225 Sport Spyder "Tuboscocca" by Vignale	(Italy) Ferrari
6	4	1953	(Italy) Felice Bonetto	Lancia D24	(Italy) Lancia
7	5	1954	(Italy) Eugenio Castellotti	Lancia D25	(Italy) Lancia

Number	Edition	Year	Drivers	Car	Manufacturers
8	6	1962	(Italy) Odoardo Govoni	Maserati	(Italy) Maserati
9	7	1963	(Germany) Hans Herrmann	Abarth	(Italy) Abarth
10	8	1964	(Italy) Odoardo Govoni	Maserati	(Italy) Maserati
11	9	1965	(Germany) Hans Herrmann	Abarth	(Italy) Abarth
12	10	1966	(Italy) Giacomo Moioli, 'Noris'	Porsche	(Germany) Porsche
13	11	1967	(Austria) Johannes Ortner	Abarth	(Italy) Abarth
14	12	1968	(Austria) Johannes Ortner	Abarth	(Italy) Abarth
15	13	1969	(Italy) Vittorio Venturi	Tecno F3	(Italy) Tecno

== Classic Car winners ==
Number	Edition	Year	Drivers	Car	Manufacturers
16	14	2001	(Italy) Renzo Raimondi	De Tomaso Pantera	(Italy) De Tomaso
17	15	2002	(Italy) Daniele Grazzini	Lotus 23 Sport	(United Kingdom) Lotus
18	16	2003	(Italy) Giuliano Giuliani	BMW 2002	(Germany) BMW
19	17	2004	(Italy) David Baldi	McNamara Sport	(Germany) McNamara
20	18	2005	(Italy) Roberto Benelli	Chevron B19	(United Kingdom) Chevron
21	19	2006	(Italy) David Baldi	Osella PA9	(Italy) Osella
22	20	2007	(Italy) Daniele Grazzini	Osella PA7/9	(Italy) Osella
23	21	2008	(Italy) Marco Naldini	Osella PA9	(Italy) Osella
24	22	2009	(Italy) Umberto Bonucci	Osella PA9	(Italy) Osella
25	23	2010	(Italy) Denis Zardo	Osella PA9	(Italy) Osella
26	24	2011	(Italy) Umberto Bonucci	Osella PA9	(Italy) Osella
27	25	2012	(Italy) Umberto Bonucci	Osella PA9	(Italy) Osella
28	–	2013	–	–	–
29	29	2014	(Italy) Stefano di Fulvio	Osella PA9/90	(Italy) Osella
30	30	2015	(Italy) Salvatore Riolo	Osella Stenger	(Italy) Osella
31	31	2019	(Italy) Stefano Peroni	Martini MK32	(France) Martini
32	32	2020	(Italy) Stefano Peroni	Martini MK32	(France) Martini
33	33	2021	(Italy) Stefano Peroni	Martini MK32	(France) Martini
34	34	2022	(Italy) Stefano Peroni	Martini MK32	(France) Martini
35	35	2024	(Italy) Stefano Peroni	Martini MK32	(France) Martini
36	36	2026	(Italy) Giuliano Peroni	Osella PA8/9	(Italy) Osella
