= Morelli (company) =

Italian automotive components company

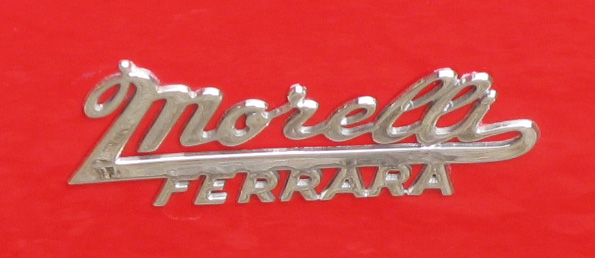
- Industry: Automotive
- Founded: Ferrara, Italy
- Founder: Gino Morelli, Nino Morelli, Rolando Morelli
- Headquarters: Via Otello Putinati 16, Ferrara, Italy
- Services: automotive design, coachbuilding
- Website: bulloneriamorelli.it

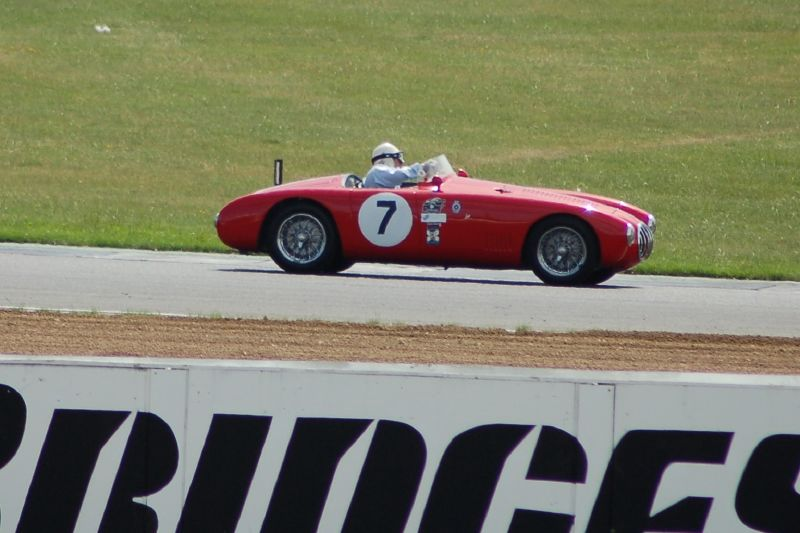
Sir Stirling Moss racing an OSCA MT4 Spider Morelli at Silverstone.

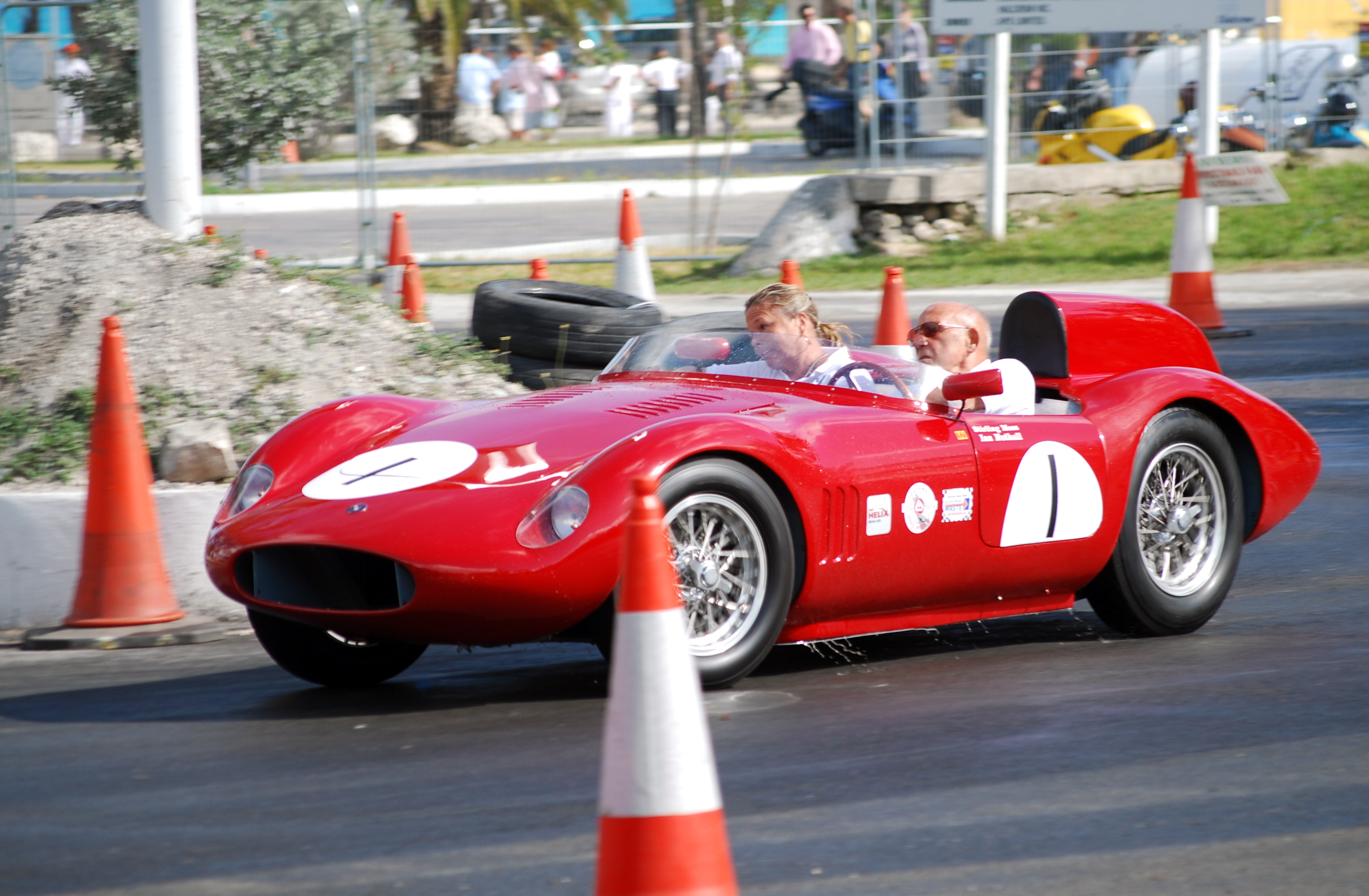
OSCA FS 372 Spider Morelli at the 2011 Bahamas Speed Week

Morelli was an Italian coachbuilder based in Ferrara. Founded by brothers Gino and Nino Morelli, the company was active in the 1950s and the 1960s, building primarily Aluminum bodies for OSCA. Of the 200 cars produced by OSCA, about 80 were MT4 models. Of the MT4 models, 40 Spiders were built by Morelli. All five OSCA FS 372 Spiders (an updated version of the MT4) were also bodied by Morelli.

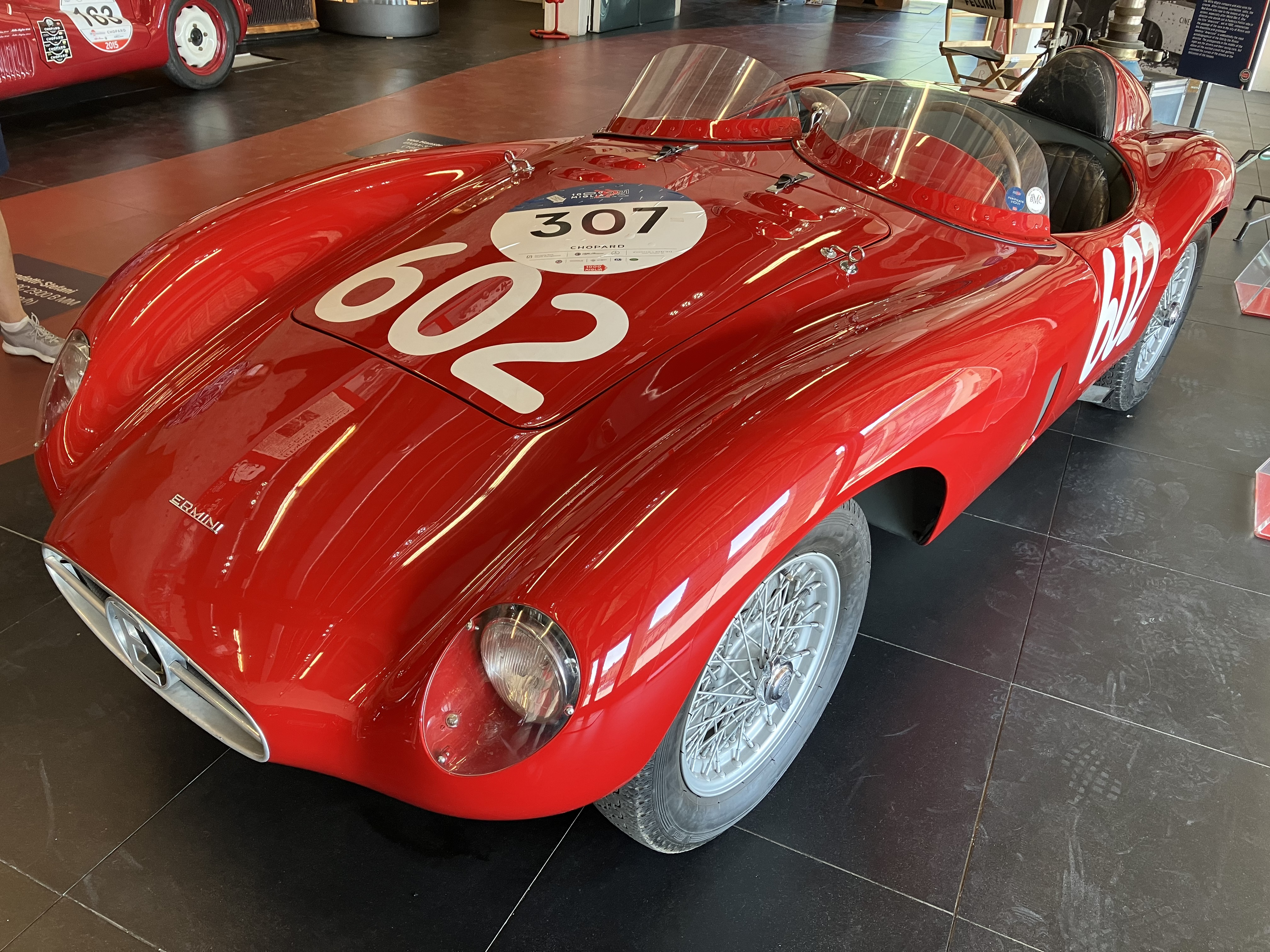
Morelli-bodied Ermini 357 Sport at the Museo Mille Miglia

Following the Maserati's brothers retirement, the company ceased its coachbuilding activity. It was then taken over by the Morelli's cousin Rolando, and today manufactures joints, bolts and other mechanical components for the car industry.

== Cars ==
- 1948 Turolla Fiat 500 A testa Siata Coupé Morelli
- 1949 CI-MA Fiat 500 Siluro carrozzato chiuso Morelli
- 1950 Turolla Fiat 750 Berlinetta Morelli
- 1953 Nardi-Danese Marco Spider Morelli
- 1953 Ferrari 250 MM Spider Morelli - (s/n 0276MM)
- 1953–1955 OSCA MT4 2AD 1500 Spider Morelli
- 1953–1954 Ermini 357 Sport
- 1957 OSCA MT4 TN 1500 S Spider Morelli
- 1957 OSCA S 750 Spider Morelli
- 1957-1958 OSCA FS 372 Spider Morelli
- 1960 OSCA 2000 Desmodromico

== Racing Sport Cars result ==
| Year | Date | Race | Car | S/N | No | Team | Drivers | Result |
|---|---|---|---|---|---|---|---|---|
| 1953 | 29 June 1953 | 1000km Monza | Ferrari 250 MM Spider Morelli | 0276 MM | 22 | Scuderia Guastalla | (Italy) Luigi Piotti | 6 |
| 1953 | 27 September 1953 | VI Cronoscalata Bologna-Passo della Raticosa | Ferrari 250 MM Spider Morelli | 0276 MM | 262 | | (Italy) Luigi Piotti | |
| 1954 | 30 April 1954 - 1 May 1954 | Mille Miglia | Ferrari 250 MM Spider Morelli | 0276 MM | 601 | Clemente Biondetti | (Italy) Clemente Biondetti | 4 |
| 1954 | 27 June 1954 | II. Grand Prix Supercortemaggiore Monza | Ferrari 250 MM Spider Morelli | 0276 MM | 68 | Scuderia Guastalla | (Italy) Clemente Biondetti (Italy) Emilio Nocentini | 4 |
