= 1954 1000 km Buenos Aires =

The 1954 1000 km Buenos Aires was a motor race for sports cars which was held on January 24 at the Autódromo Municipal-Avenida Paz, (Buenos Aires, Argentina). It was the opening race of the 1954 World Sportscar Championship and was also the inaugural 1000 km Buenos Aires. The race was won by Giuseppe Farina and Umberto Maglioli, driving a Ferrari 375 MM

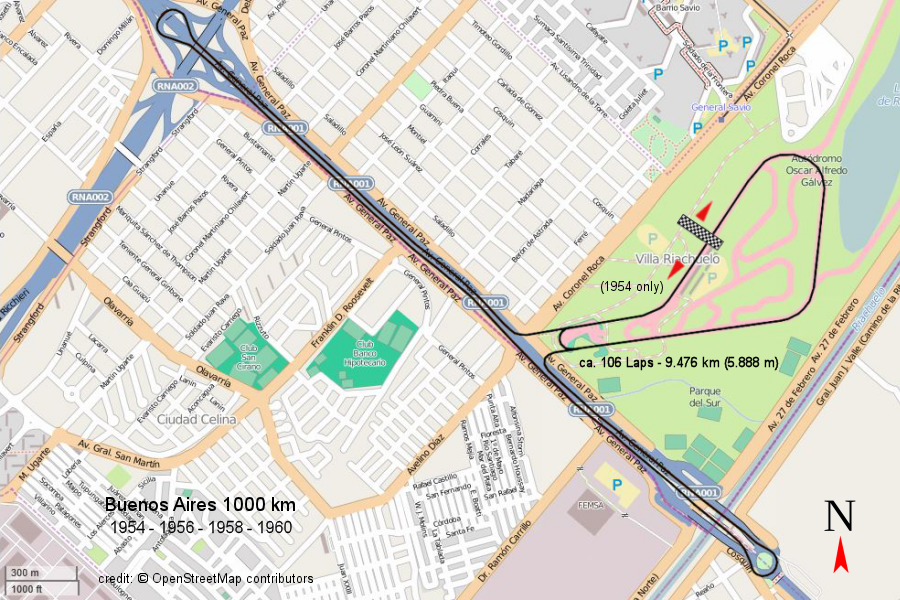
Autódromo Municipal-Avenida Paz - Buenos Aires 1000km (1954)

== Report ==
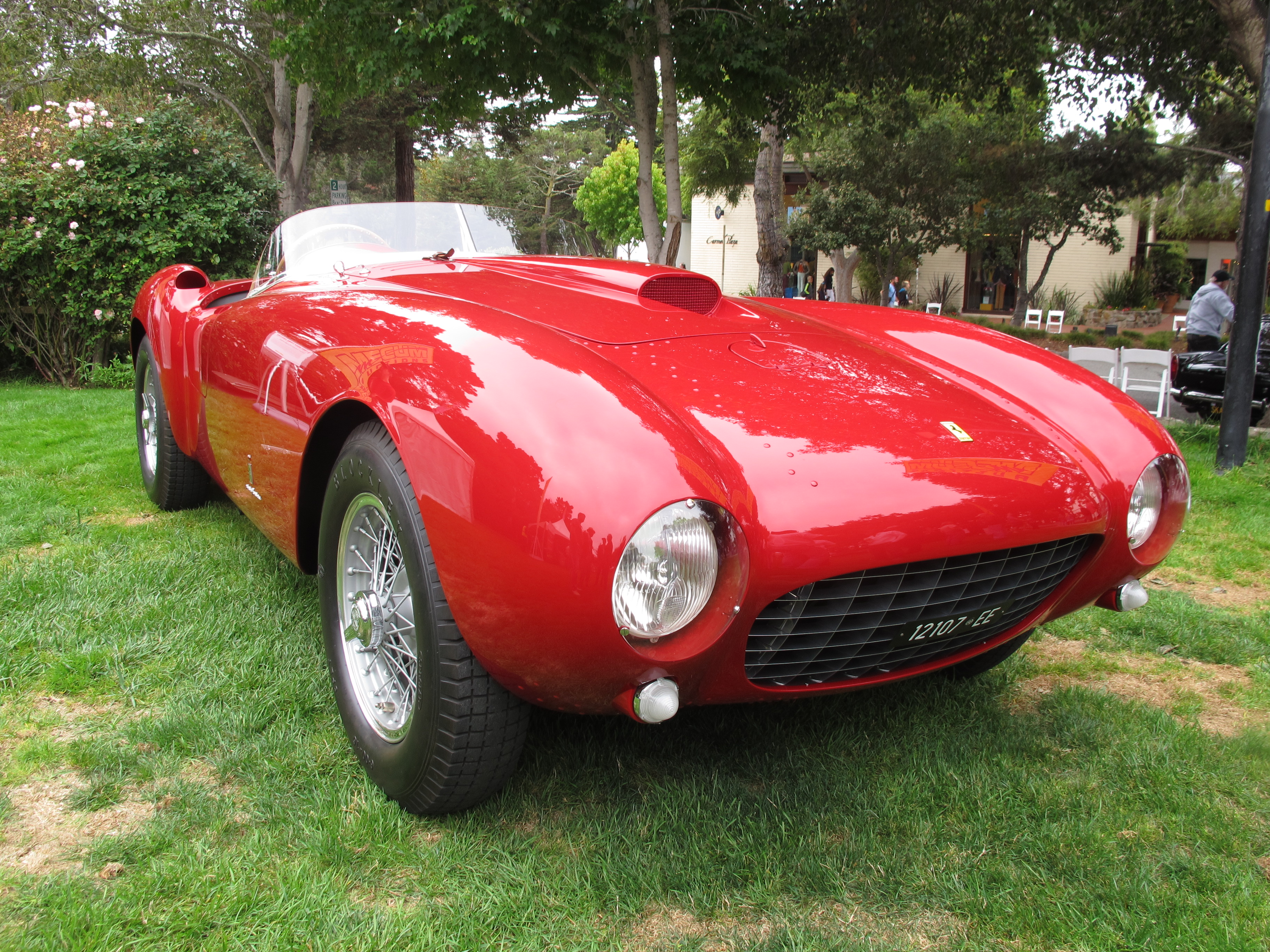
The 1954 1000 km Buenos Aires was won by a Ferrari 375 MM

=== Entry ===
A grand total 38 racing cars were registered for this event, of which only 36 arrived for practice and qualifying. This being the first major sports car races of the year, the race was supported by the work of teams of Ferrari and Maserati . Both teams were represented by one car in the race. Ferrari with a 375 MM, which was piloted by Giuseppe Farina and the young Umberto Maglioli. The factory Maserati was piloted Emilio Giletti and Luigi Musso. With Osca came another factory teams from Italy. France was represented by Gordini, and from the UK came Aston Martin’s entered by David Brown with Jaguar prepared and raced by Ecurie Ecosse. Also, the German works team of Borgward took the long journey to Buenos Aires.

=== Qualifying ===
Carroll Shelby took pole position for the privateer entry from Roy Cherryhomes team, in their Allard-Cadillac J2X.

=== Race ===
The race was held over 106 laps of the 5.888 miles Autódromo Municipal-Avenida Paz, giving a distance of 624.162 miles (1,000 km). In the race, the factory Ferrari won ahead of the privately entered Ferrari 250 MM of Alfonso de Portago and Harry Schell, as well as the Aston Martin DB3S by Peter Collins and Pat Griffith. At the lap 14, car number 42 (private Aston Martin DB3 chassis number one) driven by Greene and Stabile) got under fire and caused death of Eric Forrest Greene. Car number 10, driven by Farina and Maglioli took an impressive victory, winning in a time of 6hrs 41:50.8 mins., averaging a speed of 93.197mph. Second place went to de Portago and Schell, albeit three laps adrift. The podium was complete by the winner of the 1953 RAC Tourist Trophy, Collins and Griffiths who in turn were a further lap down.

== Official Classification ==
Class Winners are in Bold text.

| Pos | No | Class | Driver | | Entrant | Chassis | Laps | Reason Out |
|---|---|---|---|---|---|---|---|---|
| 1st | **10** | **S+3.0** | (Italy) **Giuseppe Farina** | (Italy) **Umberto Maglioli** | **Scuderia Ferrari** | **Ferrari 375 MM** | **6hr 41:50.8, 106** | |
| 2nd | **30** | **S3.0** | (United States) **Harry Schell** | (Spain) **Alfonso de Portago** | **Alfonso de Portago** | **Ferrari 250 MM Vignale Spyder** | **103** | |
| 3rd | 40 | S3.0 | (United Kingdom) Peter Collins | (United Kingdom) Pat Griffith | David Brown | Aston Martin DB3S | 102 | |
| 4th | 22 | S+3.0 | (United Kingdom) James Scott Douglas | (United Kingdom) Ninian Sanderson | Ecurie Ecosse | Jaguar C-Type | 100 | |
| 5th | 34 | S3.0 | (Argentina) Luis Milán | (Argentina) Elpidio Tortone | | Ferrari 625 TF | 99 | |
| 6th | 54 | S3.0 | (Italy) Emilio Giletti | (Italy) Luigi Musso | Officine Alfieri Maserati | Maserati A6GCS | 97 | |
| 7th | 12 | S+3.0 | (France) Louis Rosier | (France) Maurice Trintignant | Equipe Louis Rosier | Ferrari 375 GP | 96 | |
| DNF | 32 | S+3.0 | (Argentina) Roberto Bonomi | (Argentina) Carlos Menditéguy | | Ferrari 625 TF | 91 | Gearbox |
| 8th | 50 | S3.0 | (Argentina) Angel Maiocchi | (Argentina) Lucio Bollaert | | Ferrari 225 S Vignale Spyder | 87 | |
| 9th | **58** | **S1.5** | (Guatemala) **Jaroslav Juhan** | (Guatemala) **Antonio Asturias Hall** | **Jaroslav Juhan** | **Porsche 550 Spyder** | **87** | |
| 10th | 6 | S+3.0 | (United States) Carroll Shelby | (United States) Dale Duncan | Roy Cherryhomes | Allard-Cadillac J2X | 86 | |
| 11th | 74 | S1.5 | (France) Michel Collange | (Argentina) David Aperoni | Osca | Osca MT4 1100 Coupé | 85 | |
| 12th | 64 | S1.5 | (Argentina) Oscar J. Gonzalez | (Argentina) Pedro Escudero | | Porsche 356 | 79 | |
| 13th | 68 | S1.5 | (Guatemala) José Sala Herrarte Ariano | | | Porsche 550 Spyder | 79 | |
| 14th | 18 | S+3.0 | (United States) Masten Gregory | | Masten Gregory | Jaguar C-Type | 79 | |
| 15th | 70 | S1.5 | (Argentina) Jorge Chaves | (Argentina) Alberto Rodríguez Larreta | | Porsche 550 | 72 | |
| 16th | 66 | S1.5 | (Argentina) Juan Antonio Gatti | (Argentina) Julio Angel Gatti | | Porsche 550 | 70 | |
| DNF | 38 | S3.0 | (United Kingdom) Reg Parnell | (United Kingdom) Roy Salvadori | David Brown | Aston Martin DB3S | 65 | Distributor drive shaft |
| DNF | 60 | S1.5 | (West Germany) Hans-Hugo Hartmann | (West Germany) Adolf Brudes | Borgward | Borgward Hansa 1500 RS | 44 | Oil system |
| DNF | 28 | S+3.0 | (Argentina) F. Molina Zubiria | (Argentina) German Pesce | | Jaguar XK120 | 38 | DNF |
| DNF | 26 | S+3.0 | (Argentina) José M. Millet | (Argentina) Nicolas Dellepiane | | Jaguar C-Type | 27 | DNF |
| DNF | 24 | S+3.0 | (Argentina) Adolfo Schwelm Cruz | (Argentina) Miguel Schroeder | Ecurie Ecosse | Jaguar C-Type | 26 | DNF |
| DNF | 44 | S3.0 | (Argentina) Roberto Mieres | (Argentina) Carlo Tomasi | David Brown | Aston Martin DB3S | 24 | Final drive |
| DNF | 20 | S+3.0 | (United Kingdom) Ian Stewart | (United Kingdom) Jimmy Stewart | Ecurie Ecosse | Jaguar C-Type | 16 | Accident |
| DNF | 36 | S3.0 | (France) Jean Behra | (Italy) Franco Bordoni | Automobiles Gordini | Gordini T24S | 16 | Accident |
| DNF | 42 | S3.0 | (Argentina) Eric Forrest-Greene | (Argentina) Carlos Stabile | E.F. Greene | Aston Martin DB3 | 14 | Fatal Accident (Forrest-Greene) |
| DNF | 16 | S+3.0 | (United States) Phil Hill | (United States) Dave Sykes | Allen Guiberson | Ferrari 340 Mexico Vignale | 13 | Clutch |
| DNF | 14 | S+3.0 | (Argentina) José-Maria Ibanez | (Argentina) Ignacio Jancies | José-Maria Ibanez | Ferrari 375 MM Spyder | 11 | Accident |
| DNF | 48 | S3.0 | (Argentina) Pedro J. Llano | (Argentina) Ernesto Tornquist | | Ferrari 225 S | 9 | DNF |
| DNF | 46 | S3.0 | (Argentina) Nicolas Dellepiane | (Argentina) Martin Berasategui | | Ferrari 225 S | 5 | DNF |
| DNF | 72 | S1.5 | (United States) Bob Said | (United States) George Moffett | Jack Frierson | Osca MT4 1350 | 5 | Gearbox |
| DNF | 62 | S1.5 | (Argentina) Tomas Mayol | (Argentina) Juan Mayol | | Porsche 550 | 2 | DNF |
| DNF | 8 | S+3.0 | (Argentina) Carlos Najurieta | (Argentina) Alberto Gomez | | Ford-Maserati V8 | 0 | DNF |
| DNF | 53 | S3.0 | (France) Élie Bayol | (France) Roger Loyer | Automobiles Gordini | Gordini T15S | | Lost wheel / Accident |
| DNS | 2 | S+3.0 | (Argentina) Enrique Saenz Valiente | (Argentina) Jorge Camano | Boliari | Arauz-Cadillac | | |

- Fastest Lap: Giuseppe Farina, 3:34.6secs (98.779 mph)

=== Class Winners ===
| Class | Winners | | |
|---|---|---|---|
| Sports +3000 | 10 | Ferrari 375 MM | Farina / Maglioli |
| Sports 3000 | 30 | Ferrari 250 MM Vignale Spyder | Schell / de Portago |
| Sports 1500 | 58 | Porsche 550 Spyder | Juhan / Asturias Hall |

== Standings after the race ==
| Pos | Championship | Points |
|---|---|---|
| 1 | (Italy) Ferrari | 8 |
| 2 | (United Kingdom) Aston Martin | 4 |
| 3 | (United Kingdom) Jaguar | 3 |
| 4 | (Italy) Maserati | 1 |

- Note: Only the top five positions are included in this set of standings.

Championship points were awarded for the first six places in each race in the order of 8-6-4-3-2-1. Manufacturers were only awarded points for their highest finishing car with no points awarded for positions filled by additional cars. Only the best 4 results out of the 6 races could be retained by each manufacturer.

World Sportscar Championship
| Previous race: 1953 Carrera Panamericana | 1954 season | Next race: 12 Hours of Sebring |
