= 1954 World Sportscar Championship =

Racing tournament

Seasons
- ← 1953 1955 →

The 1954 World Sportscar Championship was a motor racing competition for Sportscars. It was the second FIA World Sportscar Championship. It featured a series of six endurance races, contested from 24 January to 23 November 1954. The championship was won by Ferrari.

== Season summary ==
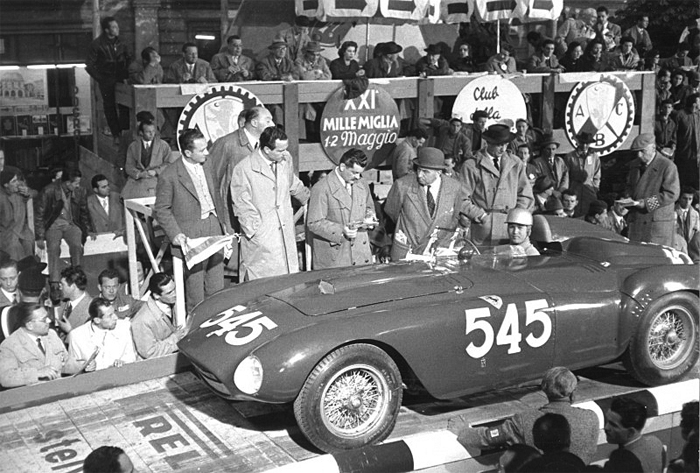
Ferrari won the championship with its Ferrari 375 Plus (pictured), 375 MM and 750 Monza models.

The 1954 World Sports Car Championship was contested over a six race series. With legendary races such as the Mille Miglia and the Carrera Panamericana now part of the international race calendar, they were accompanied by the 24 Hours of Le Mans, 12 Hours of Sebring and the RAC Tourist Trophy. The championship started in January in Argentina with a new race to the calendar, the 1000 km Buenos Aires, but the 24 Hours of Spa was omitted. The 1000 km Nürburgring was originally scheduled for the 29th of August, however once it became clear that the Mercedes 300 SLRs would not be ready in time, the race was cancelled with organisers fearing another poor attendance.

The Championship remained as a competition for manufacturers, and works teams including Scuderia Ferrari, Lancia, Aston Martin and Jaguar lead the way. The majority of the fields were made up of amateur or gentlemen drivers in privately entered cars, often up against professional racing drivers with experience in Formula One.

All races included Sportscar classes defined according to engine displacement. The Millie Miglia also defined classes for Grand Touring and Special Touring cars and the Carrera Panamericana included additional Stock car and Touring car classes. Championship points were however only awarded for outright placings. Ferrari continued to be the dominant force in 1954, winning four of the six races, a result of Enzo Ferrari’s determination to bring prestige to his marque. The other two races were also won by Italian marques, Lancia and O.S.C.A.

== Season results ==
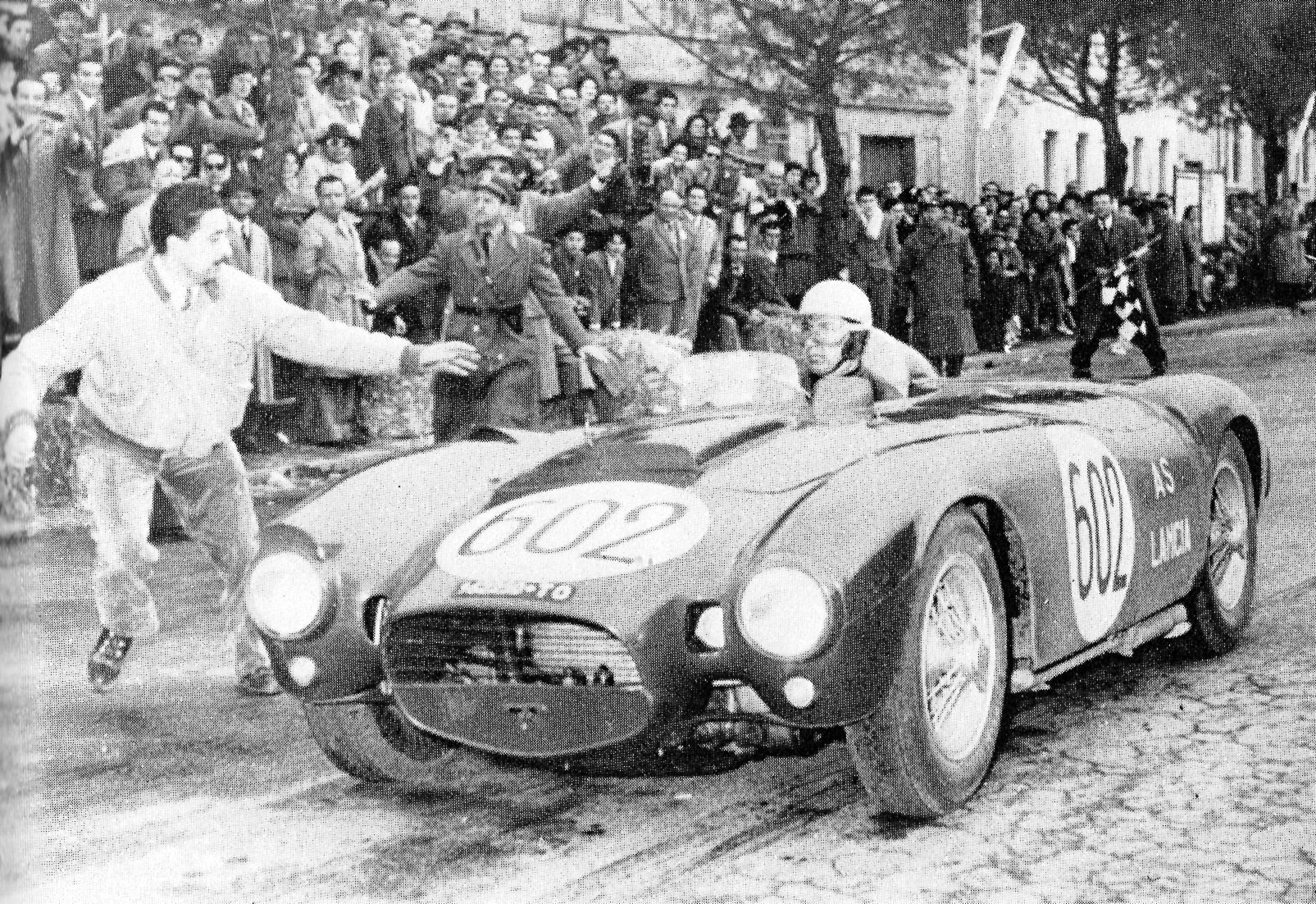
Lancia placed second with its Lancia D24

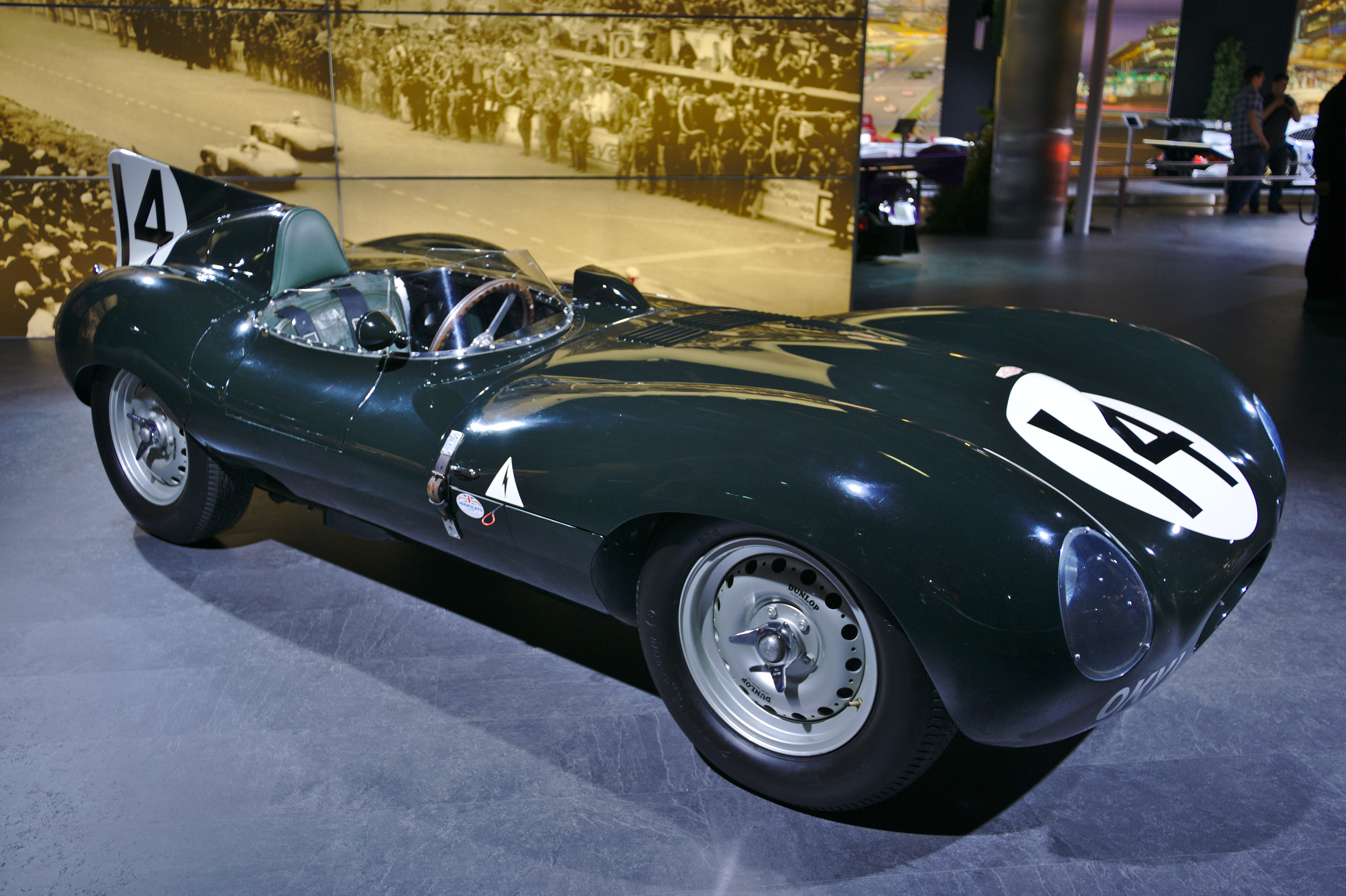
Jaguar placed third with its Jaguar C-Type and D-Type (pictured) models

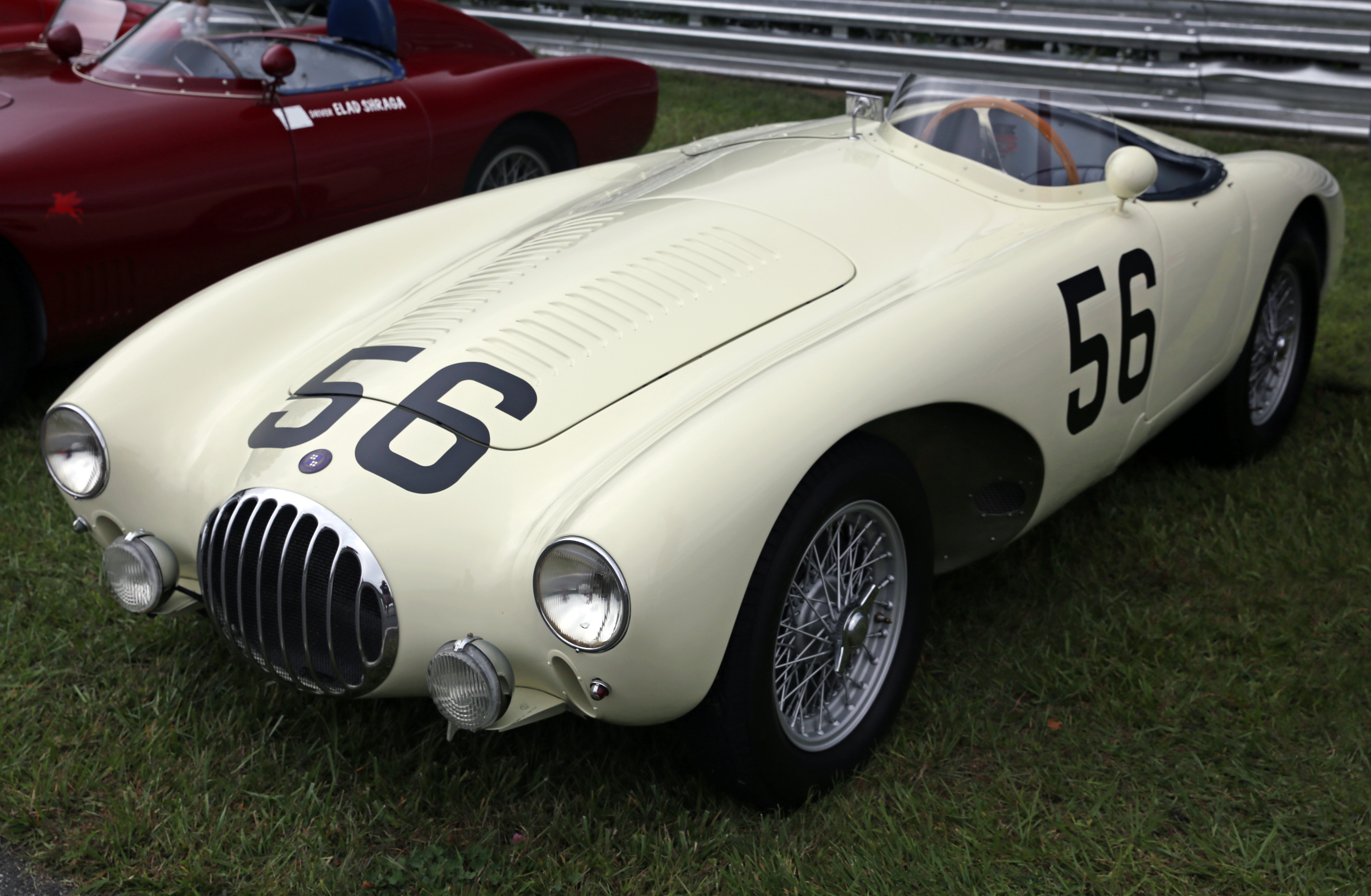
O.S.C.A. placed fourth after a win at Sebring with its MT4

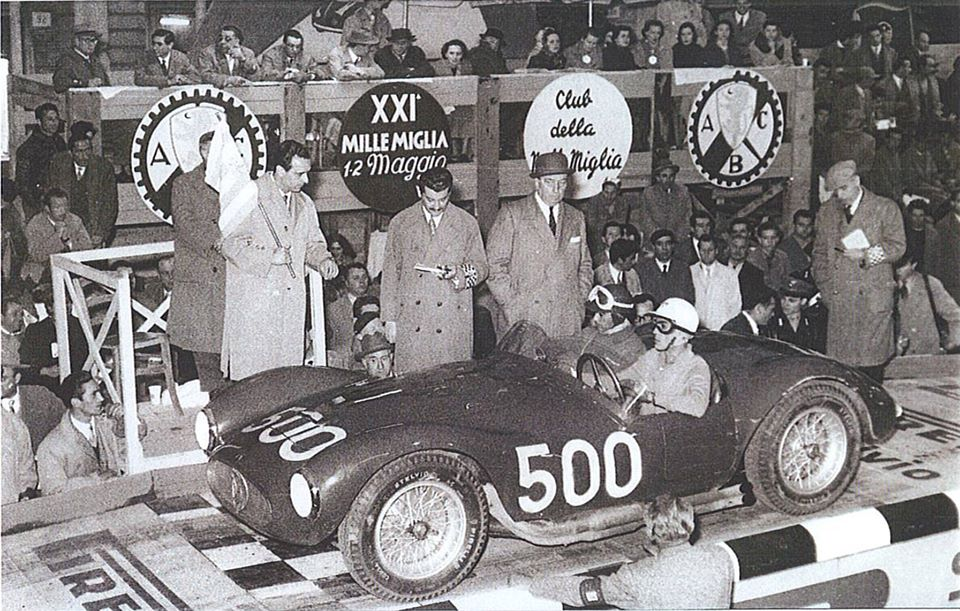
Maserati placed fifth with its A6GCS model

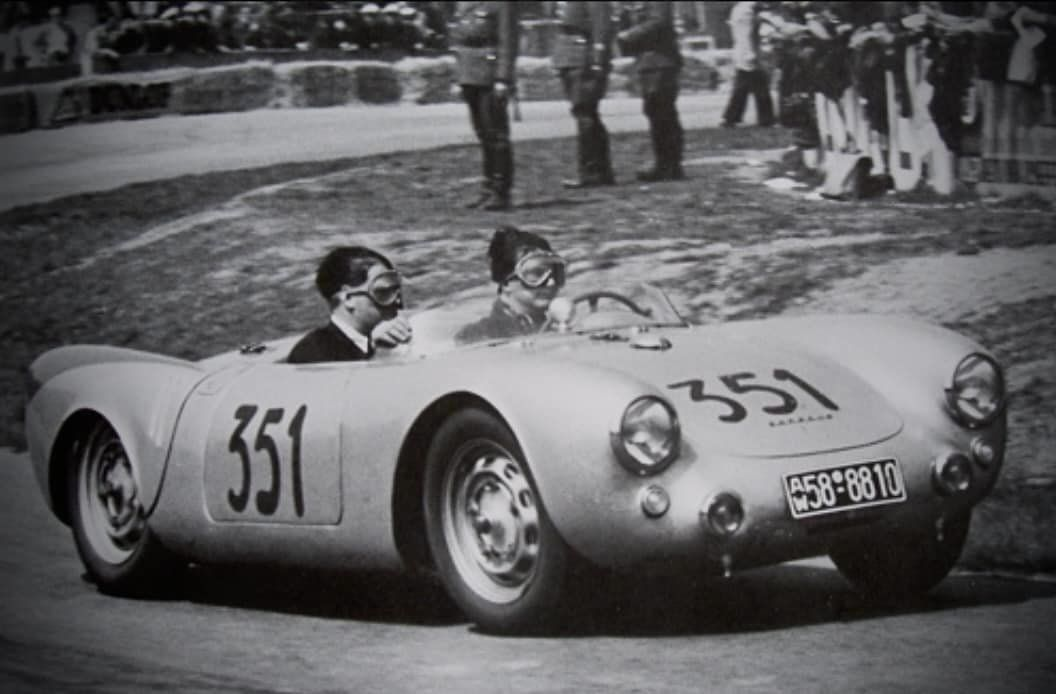
Porsche placed sixth with its 550 model.

=== Results ===
Date	Rd.	Event	Circuit or Location	Winning driver	Winning team	Winning car	Results
24/01	1	(Argentina) 1000km of Buenos Aires	Autódromo Municipal Avenida Paz	(Italy) Giuseppe Farina (Italy) Umberto Maglioli	(Italy) Scuderia Ferrari	(Italy) Ferrari 375 MM	Results
07/03	2	(United States) 12 Hours of Sebring	Sebring International Raceway	(United States) Bill Lloyd (United Kingdom) Stirling Moss	(United States) Briggs Cunningham	(Italy) Osca MT4 1500	Results
01/05 - 02/05	3	(Italy) Mille Miglia	Brescia-Rome-Brescia	(Italy) Alberto Ascari	(Italy) Scuderia Lancia	(Italy) Lancia D24	Results
12/06 - 13/06	4	(France) 24 Hours of Le Mans	Circuit de la Sarthe	(Argentina) José Froilán González (France) Maurice Trintignant	(Italy) Scuderia Ferrari	(Italy) Ferrari 375 Plus	Results
~~29/08~~	~~5~~	(West Germany) ~~ADAC 1000km~~	Nürburgring	—	—	—	cancelled
11/09	5	(United Kingdom) RAC Tourist Trophy	Dundrod	(United Kingdom) Mike Hawthorn (France) Maurice Trintignant	(Italy) Scuderia Ferrari	(Italy) Ferrari 750 Monza	Results
19/11 - 23/11	6	(Mexico) Carrera Panamericana	Tuxtla Gutiérrez - Ciudad Juárez	(Italy) Umberto Maglioli	(United States) Erwin Goldschmidt	(Italy) Ferrari 375 Plus	Results

Note: The Tourist Trophy was awarded to the DB of Paul Armagnac and Gerard Laureau, which was the winner of the Dundrod race on handicap. World Championship points were awarded on the overall race results rather than the handicap results.

=== Championship ===
Championship points were awarded for the first six places in each race in the order of 8-6-4-3-2-1. Manufacturers were only awarded points for their highest finishing car with no points awarded for positions filled by additional cars. Only the best 4 results out of the 6 races could be retained by each manufacturer. Points earned but not counted towards the championship totals are listed within brackets in the table below.

Pos	Manufacturer	(Argentina) BUE	(United States) SEB	(Italy) MMI	(France) LMS	(United Kingdom) TTR	(Mexico) PAN	Pts
1	(Italy) Ferrari	8		(6)	8	8	8	32 (38)
2	(Italy) Lancia		6	8		6		20
3	(United Kingdom) Jaguar	3			6	1		10
4	(Italy) O.S.C.A.		8					8
5	(Italy) Maserati	1		4		2		7
6	(West Germany) Porsche			1			4	5
7=	(United States) Cunningham				4			4
7=	(United Kingdom) Austin-Healey		4					4
7=	(United Kingdom) Aston Martin	4						4
10	(United Kingdom) HWM					3		3
11=	(United Kingdom) Kieft		1					1
11=	(France) Gordini				1			1

== The cars ==
The following models contributed to the nett championship pointscores of their respective manufacturers.

- Ferrari 375 MM, Ferrari 375 Plus and Ferrari 750 Monza
- Lancia D24
- Jaguar C-type and Jaguar D-type
- Osca MT4 1500
- Maserati A6GCS
- Porsche 550 Spyder
- Cunningham-Chrysler C-4R
- Austin-Healey 100
- Aston Martin DB3S
- HWM Jaguar
- Kieft-Bristol Sport
- Gordini T15S
