= 1954 12 Hours of Sebring =

Sports car endurance race

Sebring International Raceway in 1952-1966

The 1954 12 Hours of Sebring (officially the Florida International 12-Hour Grand Prix of Endurance) was a motor race for sports cars, staged on 7 March 1954 at the Sebring International Raceway, Florida, United States. It was the second race of the 1954 World Sportscar Championship and was the fourth 12 Hours of Sebring. The race was won by Bill Lloyd and Stirling Moss driving an Osca MT4 1450.

== Report ==
=== Entry ===
A grand total 89 sports cars were entered for this event, of which only 63 arrived for practice. Entries included the work teams of Lancia, running four cars, Aston Martin, running three cars and Austin-Healey with one car. The three work's Lancia D24's, entered for Juan Manuel Fangio and Eugenio Castellotti, Piero Taruffi and Robert Manzon and Alberto Ascari and Luigi Villoresi, were in a class of their own.

The factory Ferrari entries did not materialize, in order to defend their championship lead, but the private entries of Bill Spear and Briggs Cunningham were on hand. Likewise, there was no Jaguar factory team, but eight Jaguars were listed on the entry.

Some of the race participants who also were noted in other fields of endeavor included ex-US congressman Jim Simpson, "international playboy" Porfirio Rubirosa, and, fresh from finishing second in the Buenos Aires 1000km, Marquis de Portago – well known equestrian at the time and also a high ranking Spanish nobility.

=== Practice ===
It became obvious during Friday practice sessions that the race would be between the Ferraris and Lancias. The Lancia D24s lapped the 5.2 mile circuit in three minutes 38 seconds and on the Saturday, Cunningham's Ferrari 375 MM made it in 3m 31sec. Another of Cunningham cars, an Osca MT4 1450 piloted by young English driver, Stirling Moss with his partnered Bill Lloyd, turned in lap on Friday of, 3m 56 secs, although this small engined car, no one considered this car a real threat the Lancias.

=== Race ===
The race was held over 12 hours on the 5.2 miles Sebring International Raceway. The early morning rain cleared to leave a cold, windy but dry day. However, throughout the race, the strong wind blowing directly out of the north created a nasty crosswind on the fast back stretch.

With the race starting promptly at 10am, 59 cars scrambled for positions. Cunningham in his own Cunningham C-4R was the first across the line, but was soon headed by Erwin Goldschmidt in his Allard-Cadillac J2R. However, before the end of lap one, the three Lancias, of Fangio, Ascari and Taruffi had sorted themselves out and headed the field, running one, two and three with Spear's Ferrari close behind. The Cunningham Ferrari of Phil Walters, stopped for a replacement spark plug and lost several minutes. Moss was keeping the bigger cars on their toes holding down 4th.

Around mid-distance, trouble hits Spear's Ferrari, crippled by a broken oil seal. Last year's winner's, John Fitch and Walters, in their Ferrari had been marking up time, and with Spear's retirement, the only threat to the flying Lancias. Fitch and Walters had been pushing the car hard, and this too would not finish, going out late afternoon with a bad connecting rod bearing.

As darkness fell on the former Hendricks Army Airfield, the Lancias of Ascari and Villoresi, and Fangio and Castellotti had retired due to brakes and gearbox issues respectively, leaving the burden on the shoulders of Taruffi and Manzon. This D24, was still lapping swiftly on the now night-blackened circuit, at an average speed of 82 mph – more than seven mph faster than the 1953 record-breaking Cunningham C-4R – albeit with only one headlight. As Taruffi and Manzon streaked out of sight, chief race steward, Alec Ulmann announced that the Lancia would be black-flagged if it continued to race with just one light. The team's race director, Attilio Pasquarelli put out a red flag, and leaned far out onto the course to block the car's path. When the car finally pitted, Manzon protested: "The car wouldn't go any faster – oil pressure was off." He thought the red flag was a pit signal that their lead was in danger.

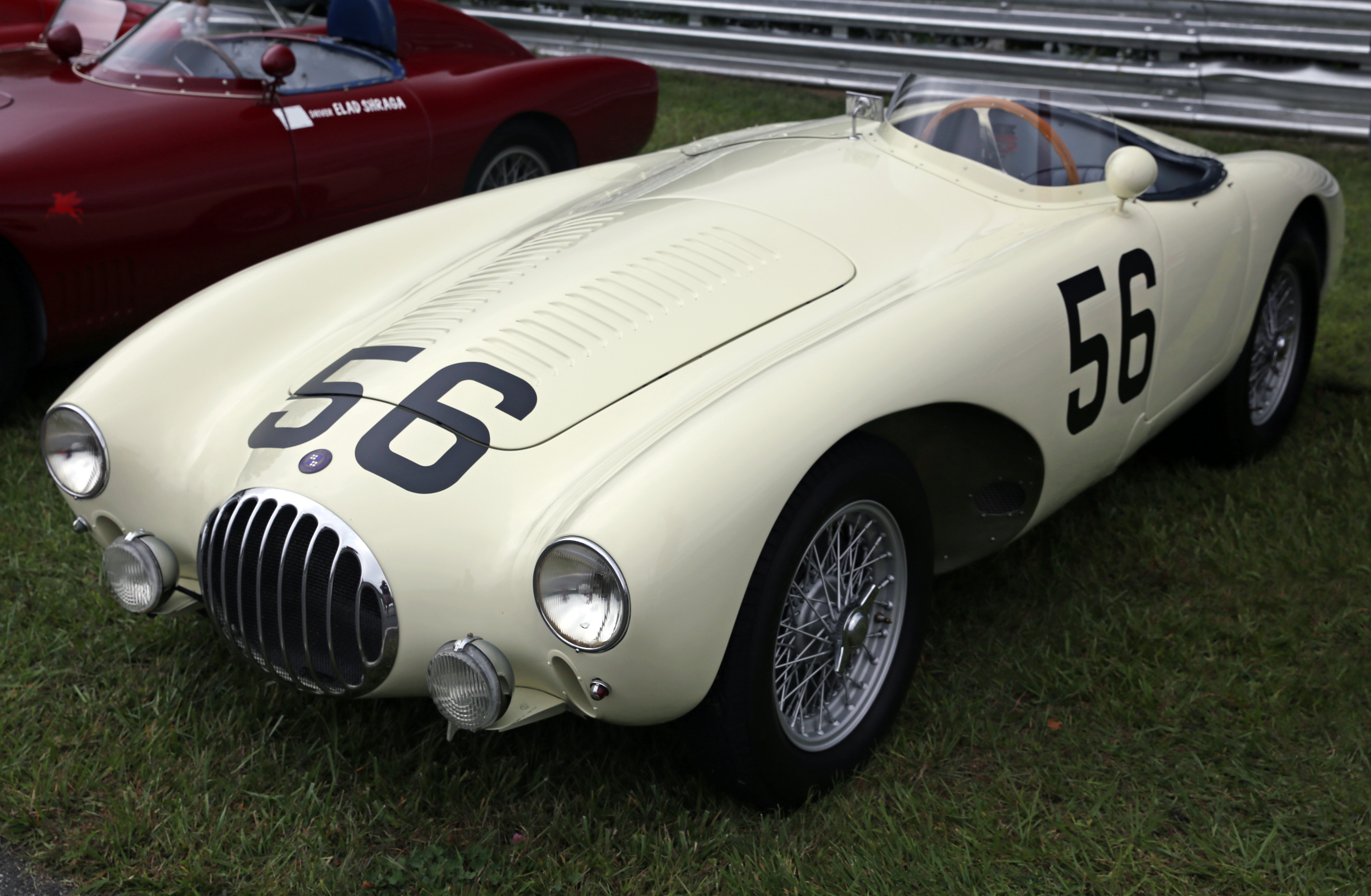
Moss and Lloyd's race winning Osca MT4

Despite, as Moss said, the Lancias were "wiping the floor with the rest of us", Lloyd and Moss soon took advantage of the Osca's beautiful handling, by throwing the car sideways, into the corners to scrub off as much speed as they started to countering the high brake wear.

The three Aston Martins had retired quite early and the leading Lancia D24 being driven by Manzon, stopped on the circuit with engine trouble an hour from the end of the race. Manzon returned to the pits on foot, but co-driver Taruffi acted to push the car for the mile and a half back to the pits. The Lancia was finally pushed across the finish line but was disqualified and the Osca, driven by Moss and Lloyd, won the race. The Osca survived a slightly suspect clutch and a tremendous rain storm to take a totally unexpected win. They covered 168 laps (873.6 miles), averaging a speed of 72.800 mph. Second place went to the Lancia D24 of Porfirio Rubirosa and Gino Valenzano, albeit five laps adrift. Third place was awarded to the Austin-Healey 100 entered by Donald Healey and driven by Lance Macklin and George Huntoon.

Although there were no fatalities during the race, James Brundage, died in Fort Lauderdale, Florida on his way home when the Allard he was driving hit a tree.

== Official Classification ==
Class Winners are in Bold text.

Pos	No	Class	Driver		Entrant	Car	Laps	Reason Out
1st	**56**	**S1.5**	(United States) **Bill Lloyd**	(United Kingdom) **Stirling Moss**	**B. S. Cunningham**	**Osca MT4 1450**	**12hr 00:00.0, 168**	
2nd	**39**	**S5.0**	(Dominican Republic) **Porfirio Rubirosa**	(Italy) **Gino Valenzano**	**Scuderia Lancia Co.**	**Lancia D24**	**163**	
3rd	**29**	**S3.0**	**(United Kingdom) Lance Macklin**	**(United States) George Huntoon**	**Donald Healey Ltd.**	**Austin-Healey 100**	**163**	
4th	91	S1.5	(United States) James Simpson	(United States) George Colby	James Simpson	Osca MT4 1450	163	
5th	61	S1.5	(United States) Otto Linton	(United States) Harry Beck	Speedcraft Enterprises	Osca MT4 1350	161	
DISQ	38	S5.0	(Italy) Piero Taruffi	(France) Robert Manzon	Scuderia Lancia Co.	Lancia D24	161	Pushed
6th	**97**	**S2.0**	(United States) **Bill Carpenter**	(United States) **John van Driel**	**W. K. Carpenter**	**Kieft-Bristol Sport**	**158**	
7th	41	S2.0	(United States) Richard Cicurel	(United States) Jim Pauley	Richard Cicurel	Siata 208s	155	
8th	**65**	**S1.1**	(United States) **Rees Makins**	(United States) **Frank Bott**	**Rees Makins**	**Osca MT4 1100**	**152**	
9th	15	S5.0	(United States) Jake Kaplan	(United States) Russ Boss	Jacob Kaplan	Jaguar XK120	151	
10th	49	S1.5	(Argentina) Fernando Segura	(Argentina) Daimo Bojanich	Fernando Segura	Porsche 550	144	
11th	54	S1.5	(United States) Fred Allen	(United States) Gus Ehrman	Fred Allen	Kieft-MG Sport	144	
12th	62	S1.5	(United States) Richard Toland	(United States) Charles Devaney	Richard Toland	Denzel-VW 1300 Super	142	
13th	9	S5.0	(United States) Austin Young	(United States) Jack Morton	A. F. Young Jr.	Jaguar XK120	142	
14th	18	S5.0	(United States) Fred Dagavar	(United States) Henry Fanelli	Fred Dagavar	Jaguar XK120	141	
15th	50	S1.5	(United States) Hubert L. Brundage	(United States) William Simpson	H. L. Brunsdage	Porsche 356 America Roadster	141	
16th	**62**	**S8.0**	(United States) **Walt Gray**	(United States) **Chuck Hall**	**Walter S. Gray**	**Allard-Oldsmobile J2**	**141**	
17th	32	S3.0	(United States) Jim Feld	(United States) Robert Gary	Brooks Stevens	Excalibur-Willys J	141	
18th	46	S1.5	(United States) Howard Hanna	(United States) Evans Hunt	Howard Hanna	Porsche 550	136	
DNF	19	S5.0	(United States) Al Garz	(United States) Len Lesko	Fred Dagavar	Jaguar XK120	134	Brakes
19th	**74**	**S750**	(United States) **Ken Heavlin**	(United States) **C. J. Davis**	**C. J. Davis**	**DB HBR Panhard**	**127**	
20th	67	S1.1	(United States) John Bentley	(United States) Guy Atkins	John Bentley	Siata-Fiat 300BC	127	
21st	66	S1.1	(United States) Austin Conley	(United States) Horman Christianson	Austin Conley	Siata-Fiat 300BC	126	
22nd	64	S5.0	(United States) D. Carleton Wilson	(United States) Bob Kennedy	D. Carleton Wilson	Jaguar XK120	124	
DISQ	10	S5.0	(United States) John Gordon Bennett	(United States) Traver McKenna	Frank Miller	Jaguar C-type	113	Disqualified
NC	12	S5.0	(United States) Charles Schott	(United States) David Michaels	Chas. Schott	Jaguar XK120	111	Accident
DNF	5	S5.0	(United States) Phil Walters	(United States) John Fitch	B. S. Cunningham	Ferrari 375 MM	104	Engine
DNF	1	S8.0	(United States) Briggs Cunningham	(United States) Sherwood Johnston	B. S. Cunningham Company	Cunningham C-4R	104	Engine
NC	35	S2.0	(United States) Alan Patterson	(United States) Ernesto Tornquist	Alan Patterson	Triumph TR2	103	
NC	57	S1.5	(United States) George Moffett	(United States) Bob Sand	George Moffett	Osca MT4 1450	102	
DNF	99	S1.5	(United States) Victor Herzog	(United States) Steve Lansing	A.E. Goldschmidt	Kieft-MG Sport	88	
DNF	37	S5.0	(Italy) Alberto Ascari	(Italy) Luigi Villoresi	Scuderia Lancia Co.	Lancia D24	87	Brakes
DNF	17	S3.0	(United States) John Schmidt	(United States) John German	John Ellwood	Jaguar XK120	82	Off course
DNF	25	S3.0	(United States) Charles Wallace	(United States) Carroll Shelby	Aston Martin Ltd.	Aston Martin DB3S	77	Rear end
DNF	42	S2.0	(United States) Don McKnought	(United States) William Eager	Don McKnought	Maserati A6GCS	67	Accident
DNF	100	S1.5	(United States) Gleb Derujinsky	(United States) Don Underwood	Gleb Derujinsky	Kieft-MG Sport	65	
DNF	14	S5.0	(United States) Conrad Janis	(United States) James Daly	Conrad Janis	Jaguar XK120	65	
DNF	7	S5.0	(United States) William Spear	(United States) Phil Hill	Bill Spear	Ferrari 375 MM	60	Rear end
DNF	48	S1.5	(United States) James Graham	(United States) J. Stimpson	James Graham	Porsche 550	57	Fuel system
DNF	36	S5.0	(Argentina) Juan Manuel Fangio	(Italy) Eugenio Castellotti	Scuderia Lancia Co.	Lancia D24	51	Real axle
DNF	44	S2.0	(United States) Larry Kulok	(United States) Harry Grey	Geo. B. McClellan	Fraser Nash Le Mans Replica	50	Engine
DNF	58	S1.5	(United States) William Brewster	(United States) Henry Rudkin	Wm. Brewster	Osca MT4 1450	47	Transmission
DNF	40	S2.0	(Italy) Luigi Musso	(Italy) Ferdinando Gatta	Maserati Co.	Maserati A6GCS	47	Brakes
DNF	30	S3.0	(United States) James L. Brundage	(United States) James Orr	H. L. Brundage	Austin-Healey 100	36	Engine
DNF	11	S5.0	(United States) Watt Hansgen	(United States) Paul Timmins	Walt Hansgen	Jaguar C-Type	28	Engine
DNF	59	S1.5	(United States) William Franklin	(United States) Ned Curtis	Howard Hanna	MG Magnette	27	
DNF	22	S3.0	(United States) Harry Schell	(Spain) Alfonso de Portago	Harry Schell	Ferrari 250 MM Vignale	26	Axle
DNF	24	S3.0	(United Kingdom) Peter Collins	(United Kingdom) Pat Griffiths	Aston Martin Ltd.	Aston Martin DB3S	25	Brakes
DNF	8	S5.0	(United States) Peter Sparacino	(United States) Raymond Osborne	A. F. Young, Jr,	Jaguar XK120	25	
DNF	23	S3.0	(United Kingdom) Reg Parnell	(United Kingdom) Roy Salvadori	Aston Martin Ltd.	Aston Martin DB3S	24	Engine
DNF	70	S750	(United States) Bret Hannaway	(United States) Miles Collier	Miles Collier	Bandini S 750	21	Engine
DNF	26	S3.0	(United States) William Wellenberg, Jr.	(United States) William Wonder	Wm. Wellenberg	Austin-Healey 100	20	Engine
DNF	33	S3.0	(United States) Mike Rothschild	(United States) George Hunt	Michel Rothschild	Healey-Riley Silverstone	17	
DNF	69	S750	(United States) Roger Wing	(United States) Karl Brocken	Isabelle Haskell	Siata-Crosley 300BC	17	
DNF	72	S750	(United States) Phil Stiles	(United States) George Schrafft	Geo. Schrafft	Palm Beach-Crosley Special	16	Rear end
DNF	31	S3.0	(United States) Hal Ullrich	(United States) Ham Reidy	Brooks Stevens	Excalibur-Willys J	10	Fuel leak
DNF	98	S8.0	(United States) Erwin Goldschmidt	(United States) Johnny Rocco	A. E. Goldschmidt	Allard-Cadillac JR	9	Engine
DNF	27	S3.0	(United States) Joe Giubardo	(Canada) Phil Smyth	Joseph Giubardo	Austin-Healey 100	3	
DNF	28	S3.0	(United States) Dick Irish	(United States) Ralph Knudson	Brooks Stevens	Excalibur-Willys J	1	Engine
DNS	20	S3.0	(United States) F. Randolph Pearsall	(United States) George Tilp	George Tilp	Aston Martin-Offenhuaser DB2		Transmission
DNS	51	S1.5	(United States) John Schmidt	(United States) John German	John Ellwood	Porsche 550		raced car #17
DNS	63	S1.5	(United States) Dickson Yates	(United States) Duncan Black	Dickson Yates	Excalibur-Willys J		Oil pressure
DNS	75	S350	(United States) Bill Wood	(United States) John Moncur	Wm. W. Wood	Rex Mercury Marine		Failed scrutineering

- Fastest Lap: Alberto Ascari, 3:32.0secs (88.302 mph)

=== Class Winners ===
Class	Winners		
Sports 8000	2	Allard-Oldsmobile J2	Gray / Hall
Sports 5000	39	Lancia D24	Rubirosa / Valenzano
Sports 3000	29	Austin-Healey 100	Macklin / Huntoon
Sports 2000	97	Kieft-Bristol Sport	Carpenter / van Driel
Sports 1500	56	Osca MT4 1450	Lloyd / Moss
Sports 1100	65	Osca MT4 1100	Makins / Bott
Sports 750	74	DB HBR Panhard	Heavlin / Davis

== Standings after the race ==
Pos	Championship	Points
1=	(Italy) Ferrari	8
	(Italy) Osca	8
3	(Italy) Lancia	6
4=	(United Kingdom) Aston Martin	4
	(United Kingdom) Austin-Healey	4

- Note: Only the top five positions are included in this set of standings.
Championship points were awarded for the first six places in each race in the order of 8-6-4-3-2-1. Manufacturers were only awarded points for their highest finishing car with no points awarded for positions filled by additional cars. Only the best 4 results out of the 6 races could be retained by each manufacturer.

World Sportscar Championship
Previous race: 1000 km Buenos Aires	1954 season	Next race: Mille Miglia
