= International Council on Clean Transportation =

NGO advice body for clean transportation

- Established: 2001; 25 years ago
- Founded at: Triangolo lariano
- Type: Global public policy think tank and research institute
- Legal status: Section 501(c)(3) nonprofit organization
- Purpose: Transportation policy, environmental policy, and energy policy
- Headquarters: 1500 K St NW, Washington, D.C. 20005
- Locations: Washington, D.C.: San Francisco, California; São Paulo, Brazil; Berlin, Germany; New Delhi, India; Beijing, China
- President and CEO: Drew Kodjak
- Subsidiaries: ICCT Brasil – Conselho Internacional de Transporte Limpo; ICCT Europe – International Council on Clean Transportation Europe gemeinnützige GmbH
- Website: https://theicct.org/

The International Council on Clean Transportation (ICCT) is an international nonprofit public policy think tank and research institute that provides technical, scientific, and policy analysis to environmental regulators on issues related to environmental, energy, and transportation policy. It is headquartered on K Street in Washington, D.C. and has a regional office in San Francisco, California. International offices are located in São Paulo, Brazil; Berlin, Germany; and Beijing, China.

The ICCT, founded in 2001, is an independent nonprofit organization incorporated under Section 501(c)(3) of the United States tax code and is funded by the ClimateWorks Foundation, the William and Flora Hewlett Foundation, the Energy Foundation, and the David and Lucile Packard Foundation. The ICCT operates in Europe as "ICCT Europe – International Council on Clean Transportation Europe gemeinnützige GmbH" and in Latin America as "Conselho Internacional de Transporte Limpo – ICCT Brasil" with additional operations in the Americas, Africa, Middle East, Asia, and Asia-Pacific.

== Volkswagen emissions scandal ==
The ICCT commissioned researchers at West Virginia University to test Volkswagen diesel car emissions in 2013. In May 2014, the ICCT alerted the U.S. Environmental Protection Agency (EPA) and the California Air Resources Board that the models displayed much higher levels of nitrogen oxide emissions than permitted by law. In September 2015, the EPA said Volkswagen could be liable for up to $18 billion in penalties for using software on almost 500,000 VW and Audi diesel cars sold between 2009 and 2015 that circumvented emissions regulations, unleashing a controversy that led to multiple regulatory probes worldwide.

In 2015 an Allgemeiner Deutscher Automobil-Club study (ordered by ICCT) of 32 Euro6 cars showed that few complied with on-road emission limits. In 2016 the ICCT measured 19 new cars and found that real emissions were 40% higher than they were approved with, primarily due to the lax methods of New European Driving Cycle testing.

== See also ==
- Volkswagen emissions violations
- John German
- International Committee of Clean Technologies
