= Tecno F3 =

Tecno F3 cars
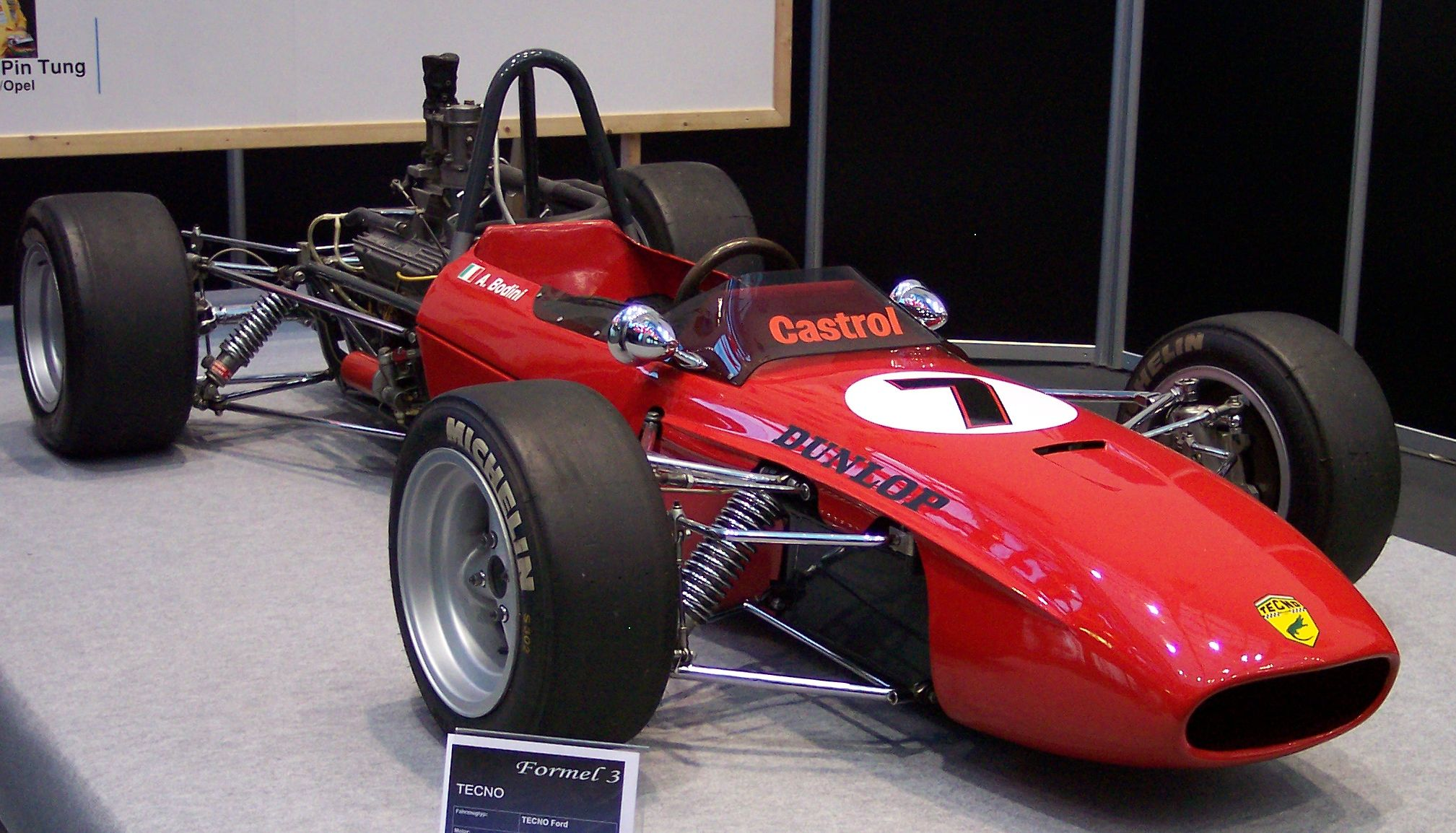
- Category: Formula Three
- Constructor: Tecno

Technical specifications
- Chassis: Aluminum monocoque with rear sub-frame
- Engine: Mid-engine, longitudinally mounted, Ford-Cosworth MAE, 1.0 L (61.0 cu in), I4, NA; Mid-engine, longitudinally mounted, Ford Novamotor, 1.6 L (97.6 cu in), I4, NA
- Transmission: Hewland FT200 5-speed manual
- Power: ~ 100–140 hp (75–104 kW)

Competition history
- Debut: 1966

The Tecno F3 line is a series of open wheel Formula Three race cars, designed, developed and produced by Italian manufacturer Tecno between 1966 and 1976, starting with the TF/66.

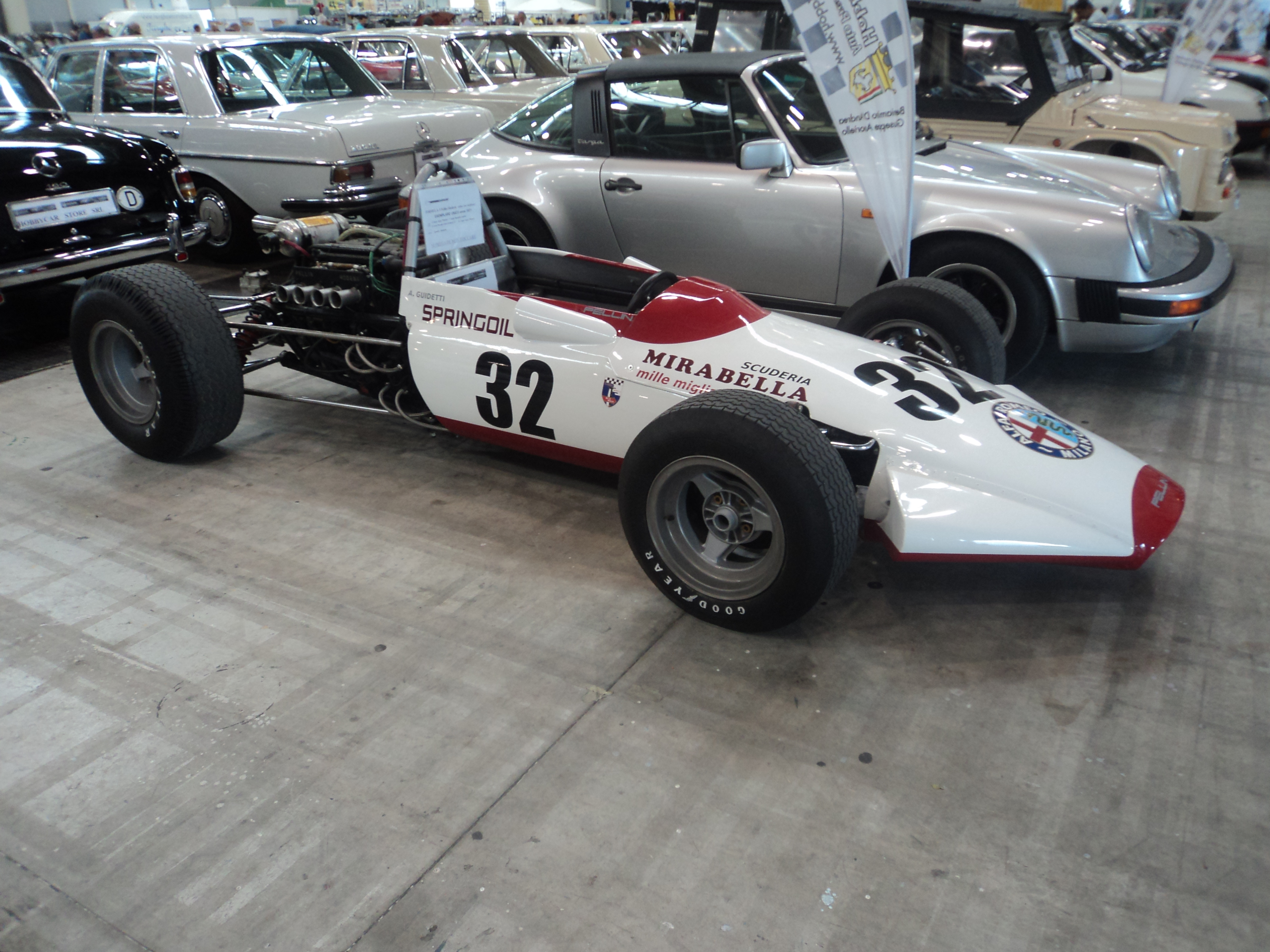
Tecno F3 car on display in 2014.
