= John German =

American engineer

John German is an American physicist who is the US co-lead of the International Council on Clean Transportation (ICCT). In that role, his research helped uncover the Volkswagen emissions scandal of 2015. German was investigating what he thought (Note: The original idea came from Peter Mock, a colleague of German in Europe.) would be relatively clean diesel emissions in US cars, where standards are more strict than in Europe. The hope was to eventually improve the diesel emissions of European vehicles. After the results were published, which showed VW nitric oxide emissions were exceeding US standards by as much as 35 times, (Note: Nitric oxide emissions contribute to smog, asthma attacks, and respiratory disease.) further work uncovered a VW defeat device. In light of the discovery and scandal, German recommends that other car manufacturers be investigated for installing potential defeat devices. German has a degree in physics from the University of Michigan, is married, and makes what The Guardian called a "modest salary" in his role at the ICCT.
