= Osella PA9 =

The Osella PA9 was a 2-liter, Group 6 (Sports 2000), sports car prototype, developed in 1981 by the Turin racing car manufacturer Osella and used by the factory in sports car and hill climb races until 1988.

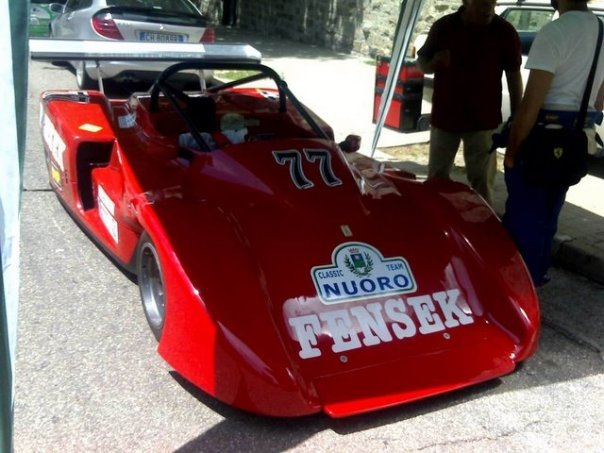

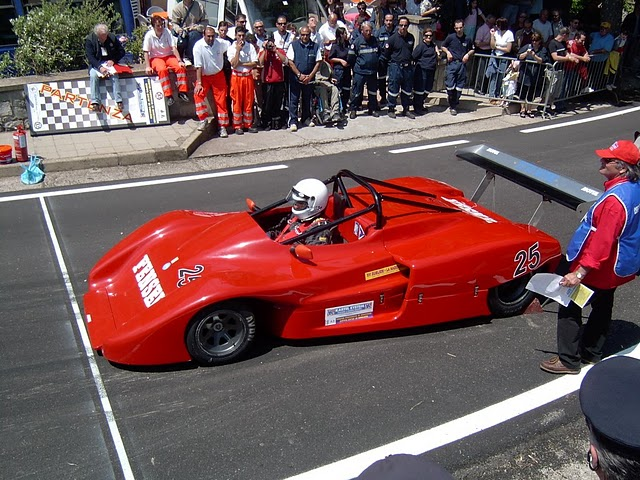

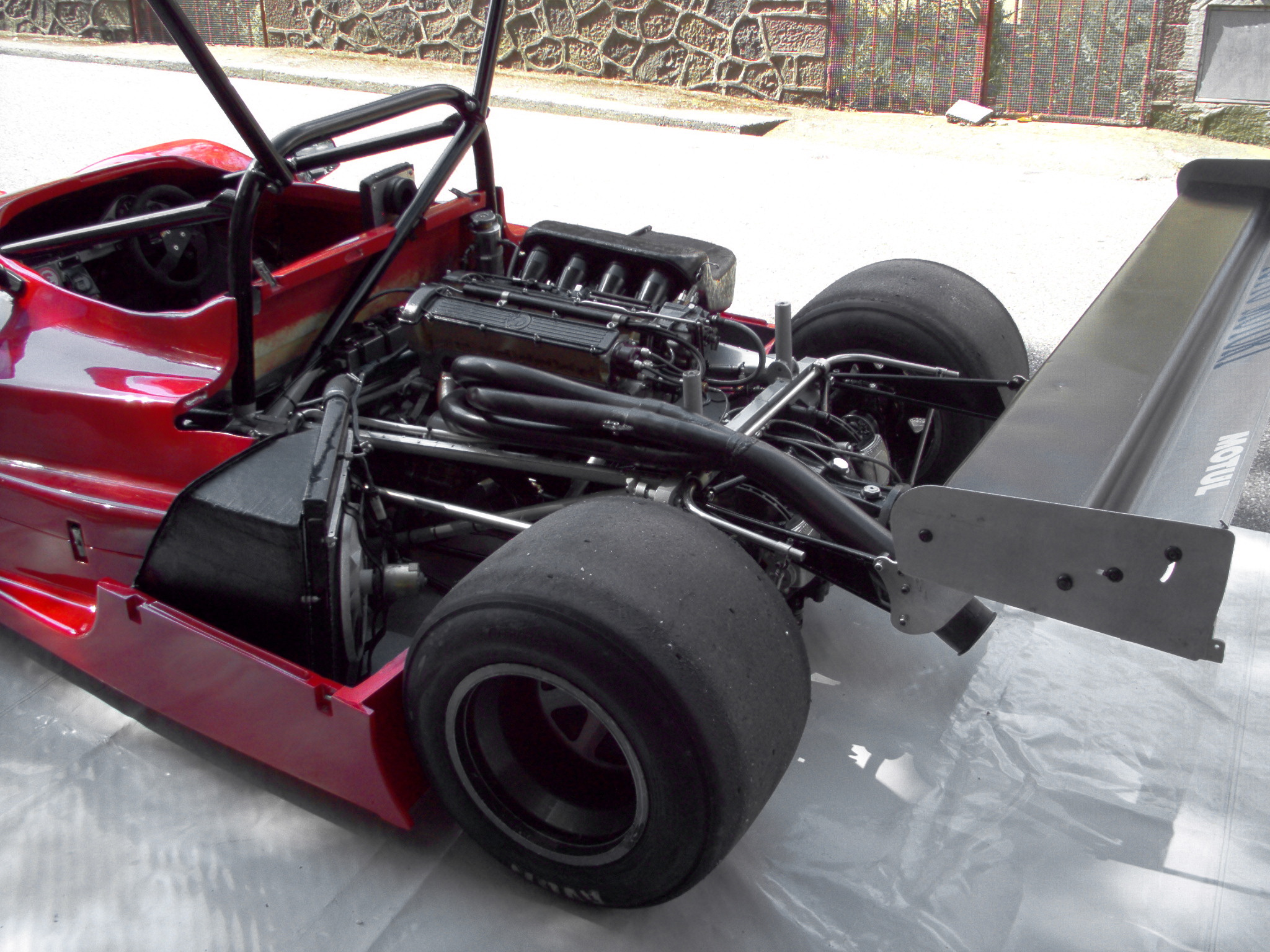

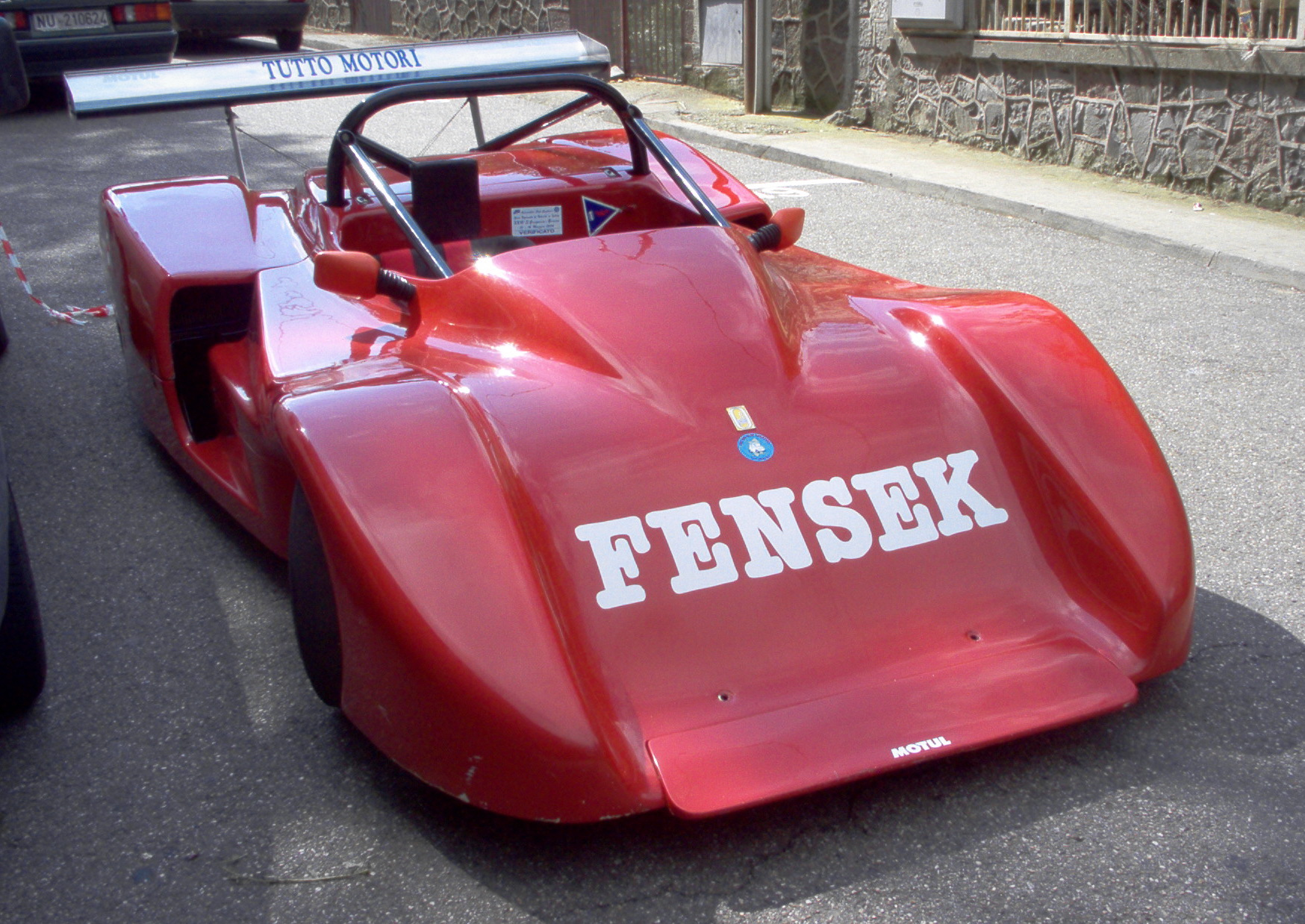

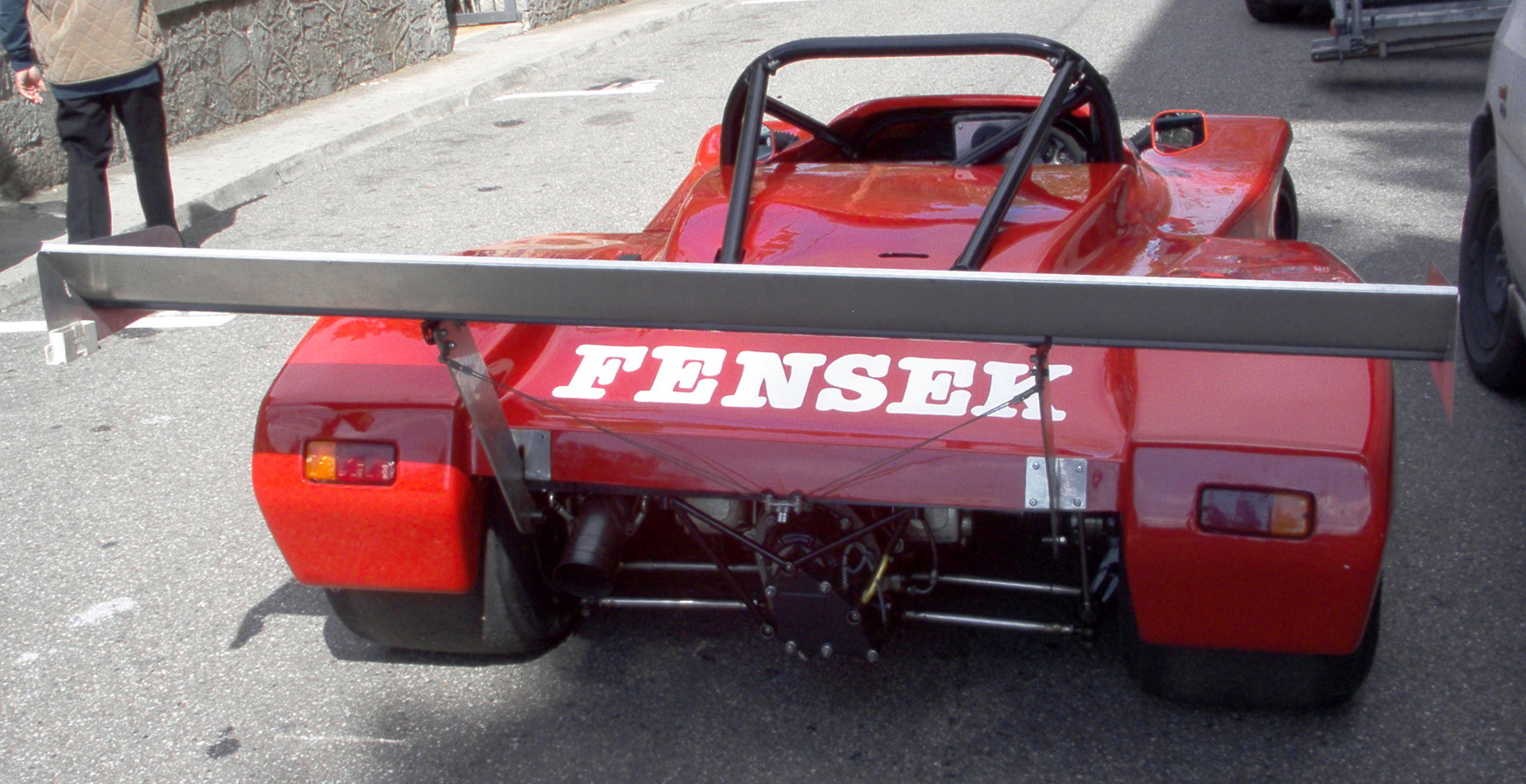

== Development Background ==
Osella's roots lie in the Abarth racing team in Turin . When its owner Carlo Abarth sold his company in 1969, Enzo Osella took over the racing department. Osella has been active as a producer of racing vehicles for sports car racing since the early 1970s; the first models still had technical references to Abarth vehicles. The PA9 was the logical further development of the PA8, with all PA sports car types based on the body shape of the PA3 and having a more or less similarly designed monocoque. A key feature of the PA9 was the 2-liter BMW engine from Formula 2.

== Race History ==
Osella used the PA9 on their own factory team, the Osella Squadra Corse. In addition, numerous private drivers drove a PA9 over the years.

During the years of use, PA9s were registered 59 times in sports car races. In this phase, eight overall and nine class victories were achieved with this racing car type. 21 podium finishes were retracted.

=== 1981 ===
In 1981, the PA9s were registered as works in both the World Sportscar Championship and the Italian Group 6 Championship. The vehicle - chassis 103 and 104 - had its first racing use on April 5, 1981, in the Group 6 race at the Autodromo Riccardo Paletti in Varano de' Melegari; at the wheel were Mauro Nesti and Carlo Franchi, who raced under the pseudonym Gimax. Franchi finished the race in third place and thus achieved a podium finish in the first race; After almost half an hour of racing and one lap down on the winner Pasquale Barberio, Nesti finished 14th overall.

Already at the second race, there was a victory that was surprising for the experts, and this at a race for the sports car world championship. The Osella works drivers Giorgio Francia and Lella Lombardi, who had been active in the Formula 1 World Championship in the 1970s, won the Mugello 6-hour race well ahead of the privately entered Porsche 935K3 of John Cooper and Dudley Wood, as well the BMW 320i driven by Anton Fischhaber and Mario Ketterer. In the 1000 km race of Monzathe two factory cars – chassis 107 and 104 – finished second and third. Lella Lombardi/Giorgio Francia and Carlo Franchi and Luigi Moreschi only had to admit defeat to the Porsche 935K3 of Edgar Dören, Jürgen Lässig and Gerhard Holup. The two Osella works teams also finished second and third overall in the Pergusa 6-hour race; this time behind the Lola T600 by Emilio de Villota and Guy Edwards.

The season ended for the factory team with victories by Francia in the national Group 6 race in Vallelunga and starting under the pseudonym Bloody Black Tiger Italians in a race without championship status in Magione. Because Osella did not take part in the races of the sports car world championship, which are part of the manufacturers' world championship, the team did not have any points despite the good placings.

=== 1982 ===
Osella had already entered the Formula 1 World Championship in 1980 and in 1981 had exhausted the team's resources in all areas to the limit by participating in Formula 1 and sports car races. The duplication was an enormous burden, especially financially. The great successes at the appearances in the 1981 World Cup could not be repeated everywhere in 1982. However, the team recovered part of the development and deployment costs by selling chassis to private Italian teams.

At the 1000 km race in Monza, the factory PA9, driven by Diulio Truffo and Luigi Moreschi, failed after 158 laps due to gearbox damage. The 6-hour race at Silverstone and the 1000 km races at Spa and Mugello were far more successful for the works team. At Silverstone, Francia and Truffo finished fourth, and at Spa and Mugello, Francia and Moreschi finished sixth and fourth respectively. Class wins were not possible for Osella this year, as the much more powerful Lancia LC1 also started in Group 6.

In addition to chassis 113, which the Italian Jolly Club team unsuccessfully used in the World Sportscar Championship, a converted PA9 (originally a PA8 ) made its way to North America and was used there by Jacques Villeneuve senior in the Canadian-American Challenge Cup, better known as Can-Am series, driven.

=== 1983-1988 ===
After the end of the 1982 racing season, Osella withdrew completely from sports car racing as a team. The remaining chassis were sold. One was bought by the Swiss racing driver Alfred Baer, who started with the car in the Interseries, among other places. The last significant result with a PA9 was Tony LaRosa with second place at the CanAm race at Summit Point in 1986.

However, this type of racing car remained successful in hillclimbing. Mauro Nesti won the title of European Hill Climb Champion in the racing car class six times in a row with his PA9, between 1983 and 1988.
