= O.S.C.A. =

Defunct Italian automobile producer

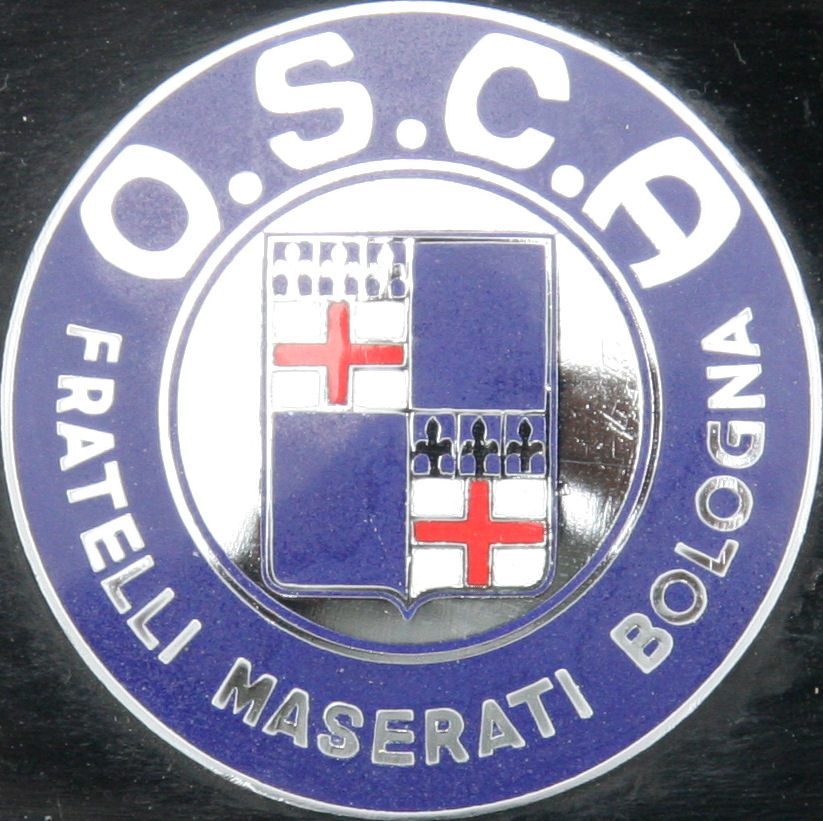
- Industry: Automotive
- Founded: 1947
- Defunct: 1967, re-established as brand in 2026
- Fate: Ceased production
- Headquarters: San Lazzaro di Savena, Bologna, Italy
- Key people: Ettore, Ernesto and Bindo Maserati
- Products: Automobiles
- Owner: DR Automobiles

O.S.C.A. (Officine Specializzate Costruzione Automobili—Fratelli Maserati S.p.A.) was an Italian manufacturer of racing and sports cars established 1947 in San Lazzaro di Savena, Bologna, by the Maserati brothers, and closed down in 1967. The brand was revived in 2026 by DR Automobiles. The company name is usually written OSCA or Osca.

== History ==
OSCA was founded in 1947 by Ernesto Maserati (engineering manager) and his two brothers Ettore, and Bindo (operations managers) who had all left Maserati after their ten-year contract with Adolfo Orsi terminated. Ten years earlier, in 1937, the remaining Maserati brothers had sold their shares in the Bologna-based company to the Orsi family, who relocated the company headquarters to their hometown of Modena in 1940. The Maserati company remains there to this day, but the Maserati brothers once again chose Bologna to be the home for their new company.

The OSCA factory was located in San Lazzaro di Savena outside Bologna, where Maserati were originally made from 1926 to 1940. Their basic business goal was to develop an automobile to compete in the popular Italian 1,100 cc racing class.

OSCA's first automobile was the MT4, for Maserati Tipo 4 cilindri. The 1,092 cc engine, which produced 55 PS (40 kW; 54 hp) at 6,000 rpm originally, had a in-house designed block, alloy head, and the bodywork was built as a two-seater, cycle-fendered roadster. The MT4 first raced in 1948 at the Pescara Circuit and the Grand Prix of Naples, where it was driven to a win by Luigi Villoresi. The engine was modified to 1,342 cc capacity in 1949, and then enlarged to 1,453 cc in 1953. A further enlargement, this time to 1,491 cc, followed in 1954 and was given twin spark ignition in 1955 for the OSCA MT4 TN (for Tipo Nuovo, "new model"). This version is often referred to as the 1500 TN.

The all new tipo 372 DS engine has desmodromic valves and was developed from the final MT4 engine in 1957 and built exclusively for F2 or sports car racing. This car received the new name F2/S or FS 372 (depending on its intended field of competition), and five were built until 1959. One of these belonged to Sir Stirling Moss, who raced it in historic races across the globe until his retirement in 2011. Versions of this engine went on to be used in coupé and convertible models of regular Fiats from 1959 to 1966.

The 1954 12 Hours of Sebring was won by drivers Stirling Moss and Bill Lloyd in an OSCA MT4 as part of the Briggs Cunningham Team. In 1955, a 1500 TN engined MT4 chassis with a streamliner body called the "Simpson Special" beat a number of records at the Bonneville Salt Flats. Afterwards, the car was sold to Harry Allen Chapman, heir to the Mobil fortune, who went on to take a minor share of OSCA and also replaced Edgar Fronteras as the company's US distributor.

From 1951 to 1962, automobiles or engines made by OSCA also were entered in some Formula One and Formula Two events although they mainly built small sports cars of which some were designed by Pietro Frua. In the World Sportscar Championship OSCA ranked 10th (1953), 4th (1954), 6th (1957), 5th (1958) and 4th (1961).

The 750 cc 70 hp (51 kW) type S 187 was introduced in 1956. Weighing 430 kg (948 lb), this car had a top speed of 110 mph (180 km/h). The name "187" refers to the displacement in cubic centimetres of each cylinder of the engine. In 1959 Jim Eichenlaub won the American H-Mod Title with his OSCA S 187. Operating on a shoestring budget, Eichenlaub often slept in his tow car because there was no money for a motel. However he won his first race at Pensacola in April 1959.

The Formula Junior (FJ) used a Fiat engine of 1089 cc, and saw wins by Colin Davis and Berardo Taraschi in 1959.

In 1963 the brothers sold the company to Count Domenico Agusta, owner of MV Agusta. They did design work for Agusta until 1966. One of their final designs was a desmodromic four-cylinder engine. OSCA ended operations in 1967.

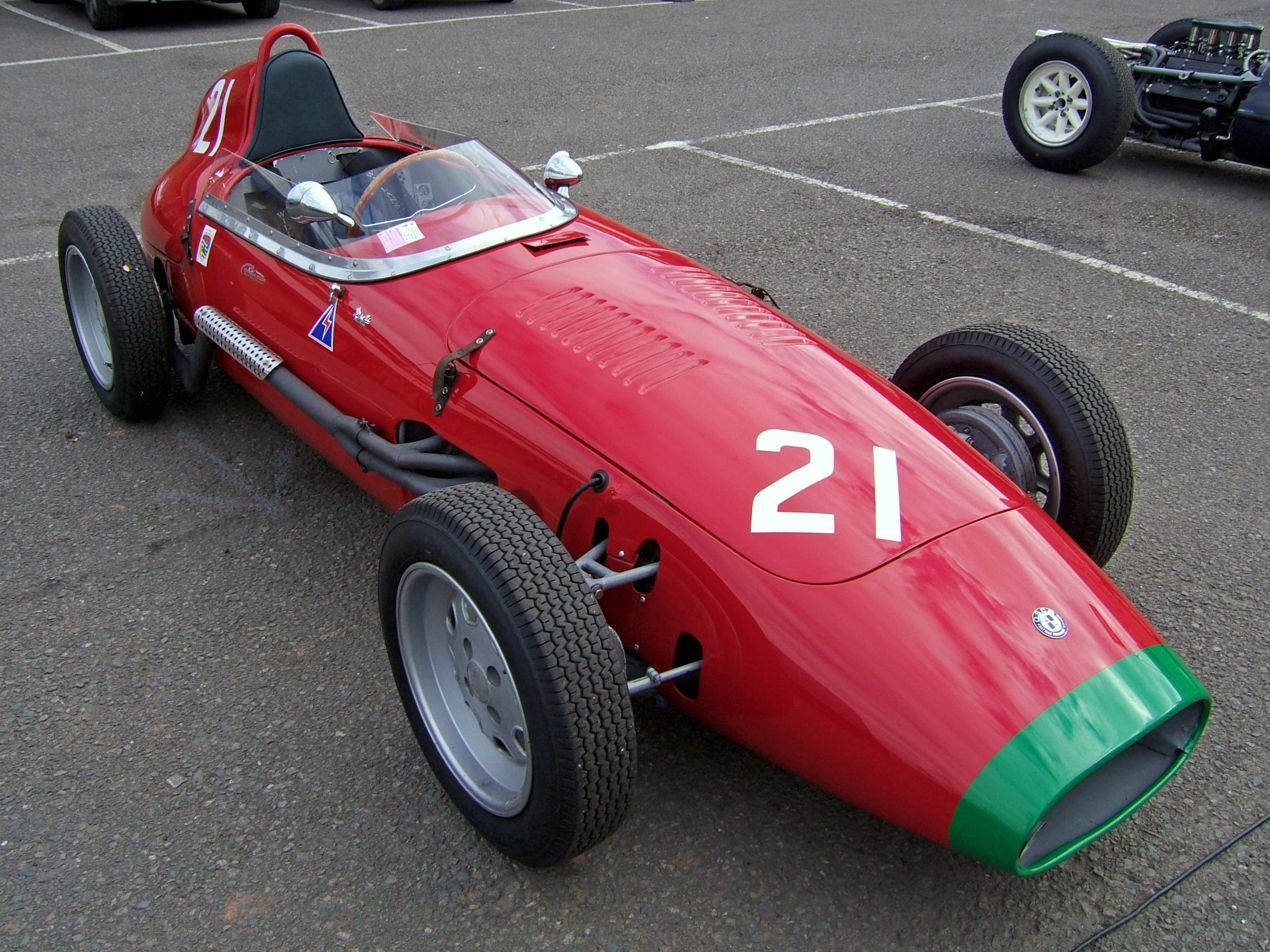
1959 FJ 1100 at Donington Park (2007).

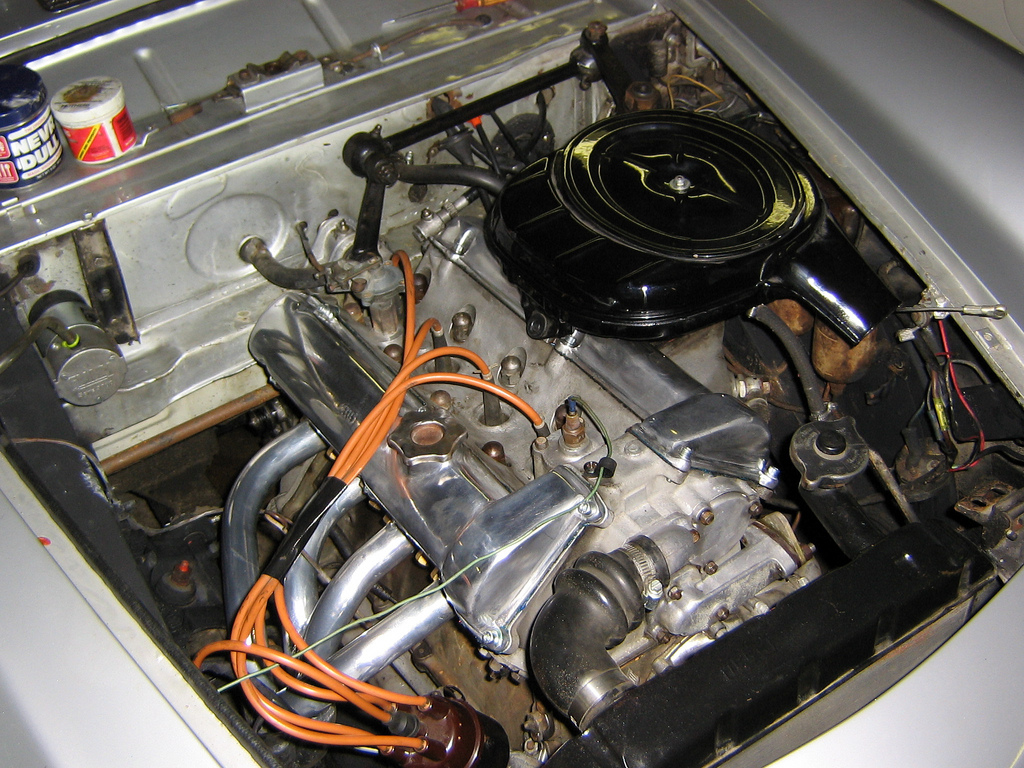
The OSCA twin cam engine of the Fiat 1500 S

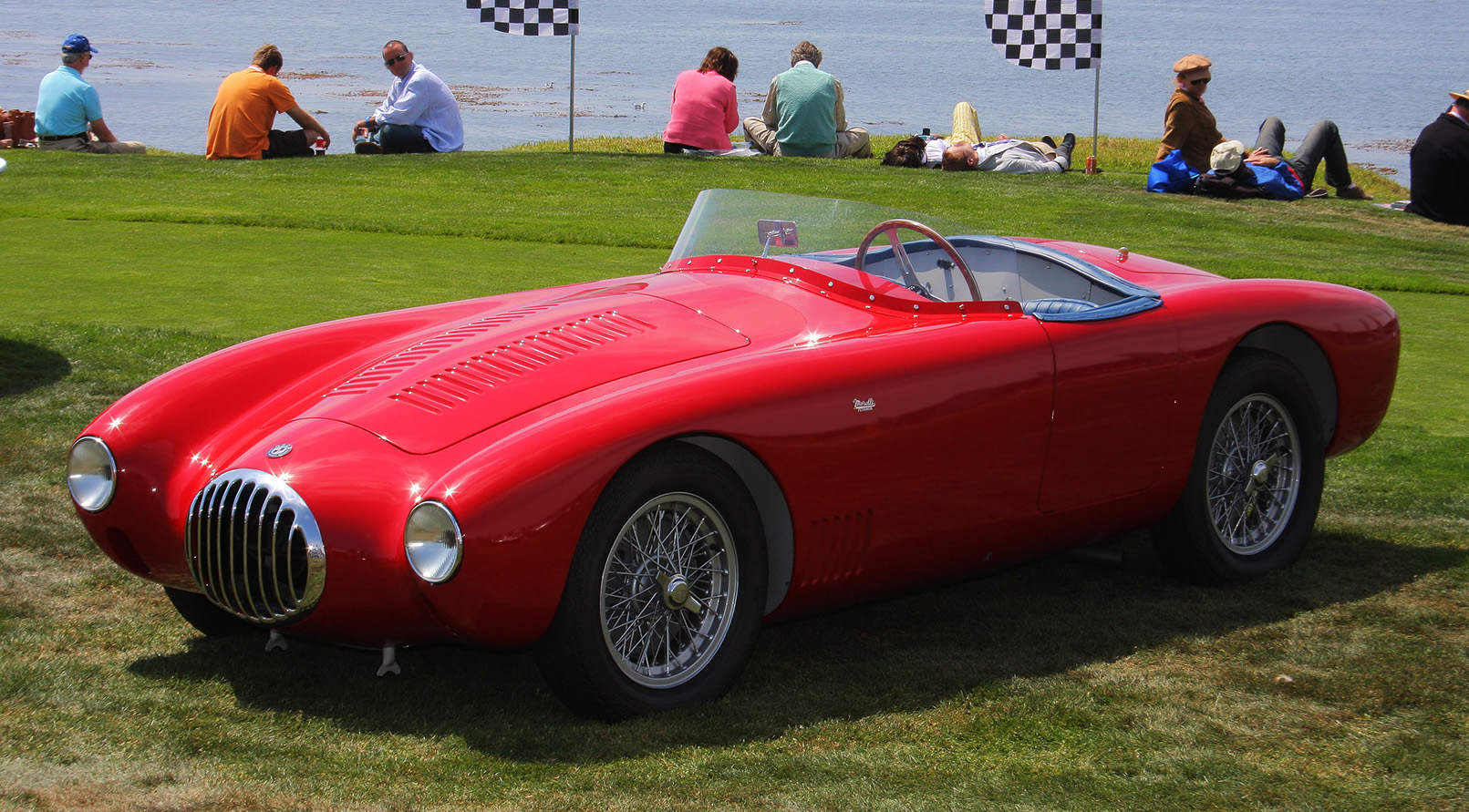
1955 OSCA MT4 Spider by Morelli

=== OSCA Fiats ===
The 1500S Coupé and Convertible were available with OSCA's twin cam 1491 cc engine as the 1200 were produced with a Fiat engine. These 90 PS SAE (66 kW) 1500S models, DIN-rated at 80 PS (59 kW), went on sale in November 1959 with Pininfarina bodywork. The engine was uprated to 1568 cc and 100 PS SAE (74 kW), 90 PS (66 kW) DIN in the summer of 1962 (1600 S, tipo 118SB) thanks to a 2 mm bore increase. The shell underwent a facelift as the original Fiat 1200 was replaced by the 1300/1500 in 1963. The 1600 S continued in production until replaced by the Fiat 124 coupé/spider, which used Fiat's own twin cam engine, in late 1966. In total, 3,089 OSCA-engined Fiat Coupés and Convertibles were built.

=== OSCA 1600 GT ===
OSCA also offered their own cars powered by the 1.6-liter derivative of Aurelio Lampredi's four-cylinder twin-cam engine, as installed in the Fiat 1600 S. Called 1600 GT or GTS, these featured a tubular chassis with independent suspension at the front and rear. Of 128 OSCA 1600 cars built between 1960 and 1963, 98 were bodied by Zagato while the remaining cars were bodied by other coachbuilders such as Fissore and Touring. The Zagato cars (sometimes called 1600 GTZ) feature lightweight alloy coachwork with the company's signature "double-bubble" roof.

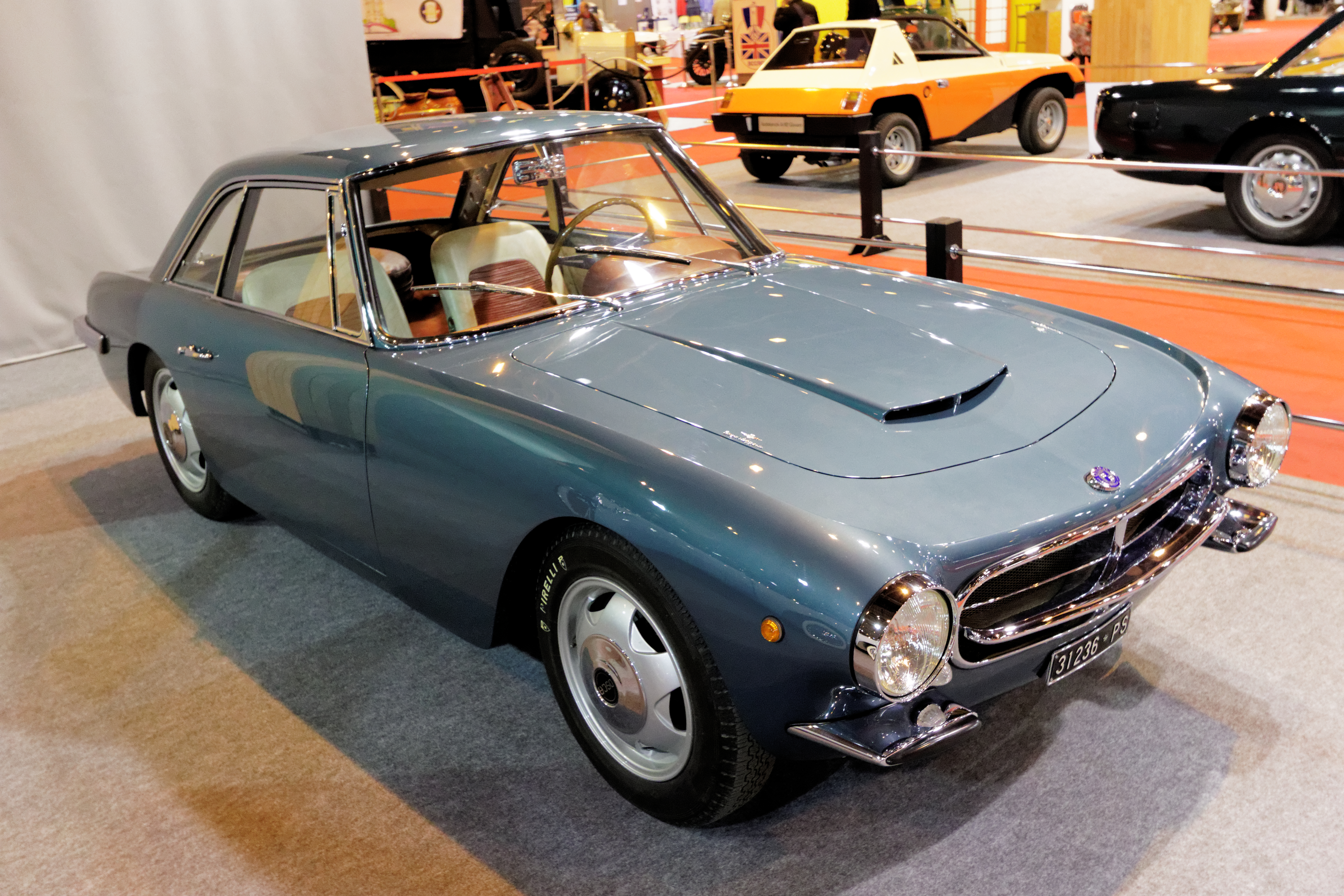
1961 OSCA 1600 GT Touring

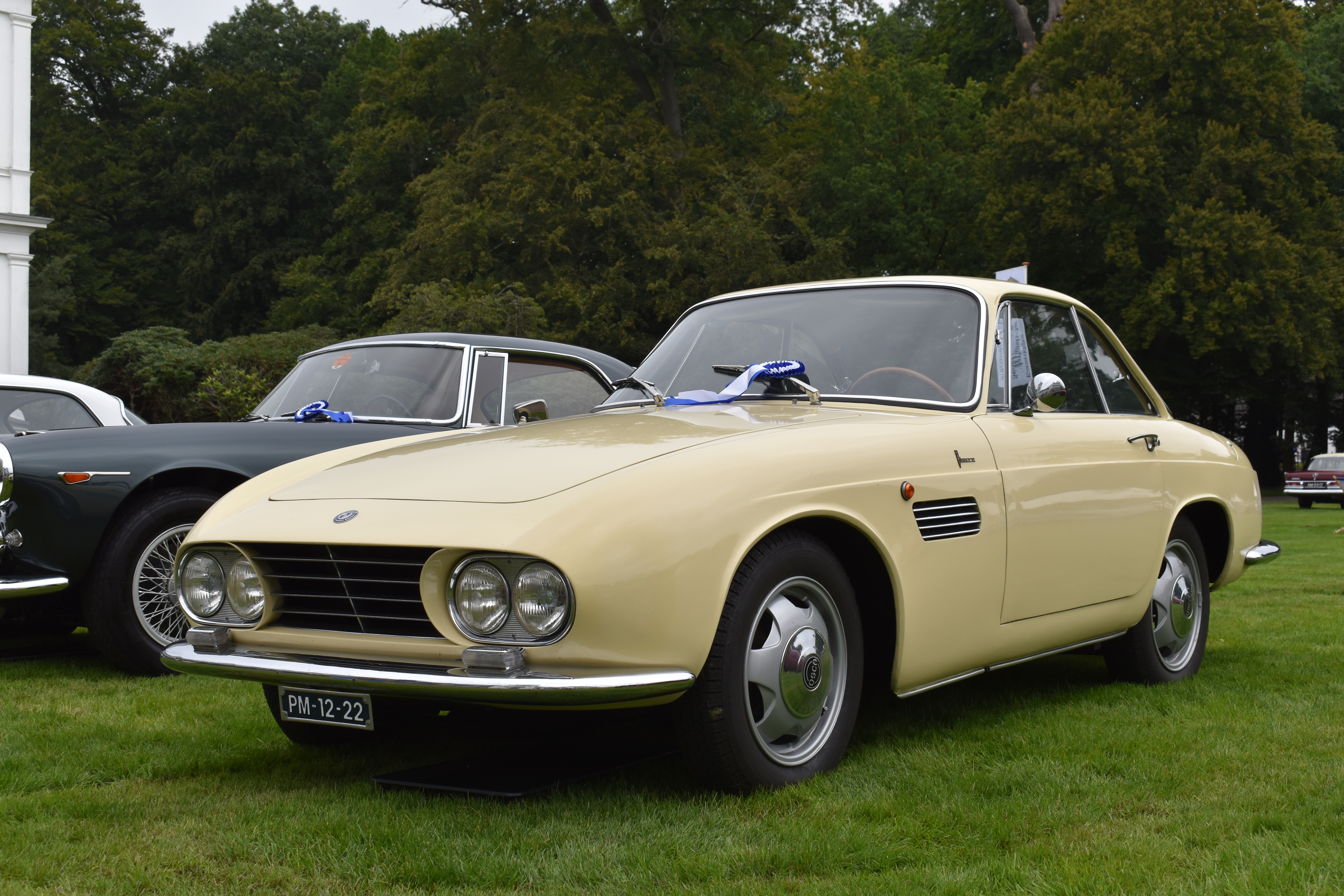
1961 OSCA 1600 GT2 with Fissore bodywork

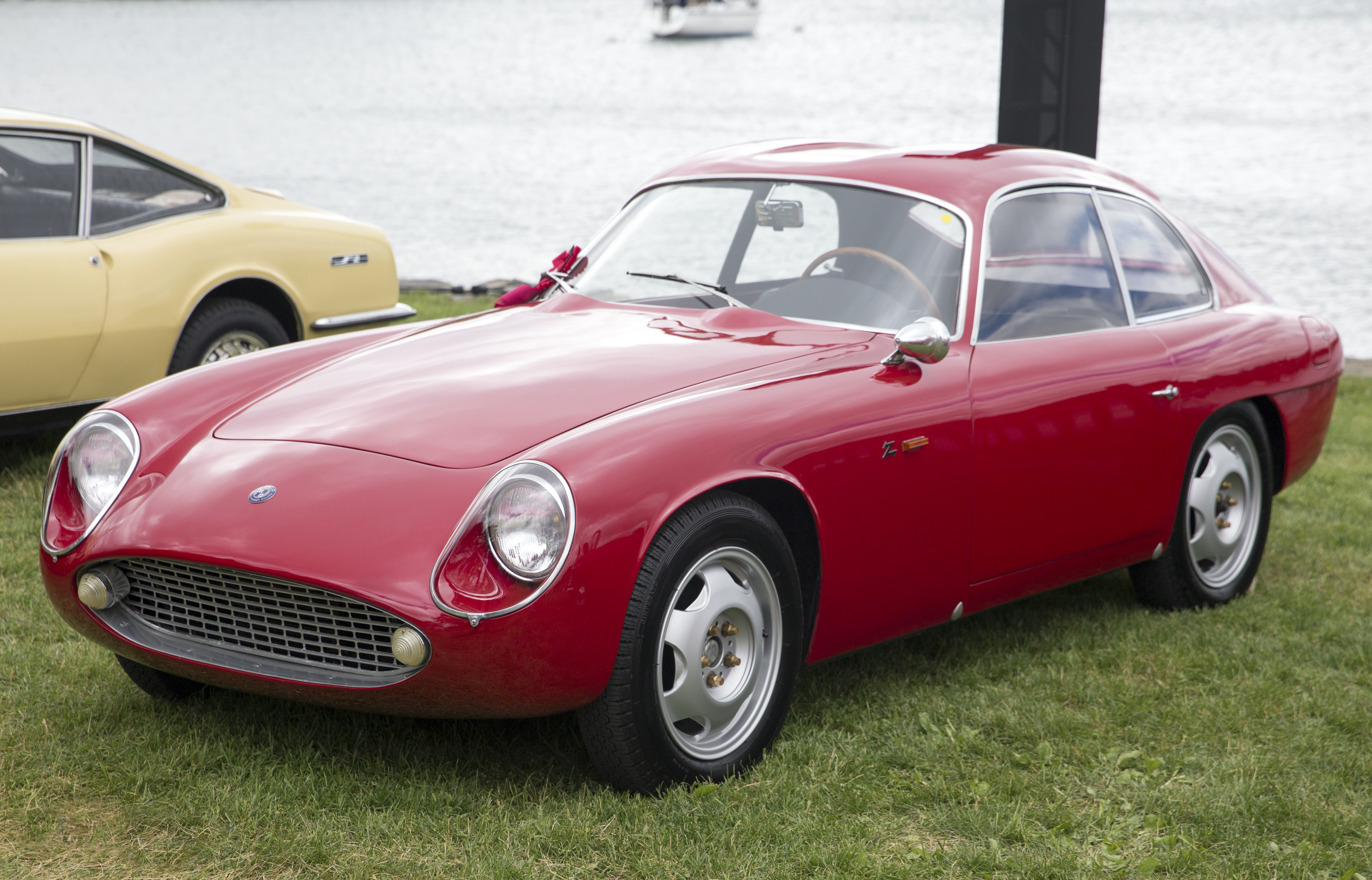
1962 OSCA 1600 GTS by Zagato, with covered headlights

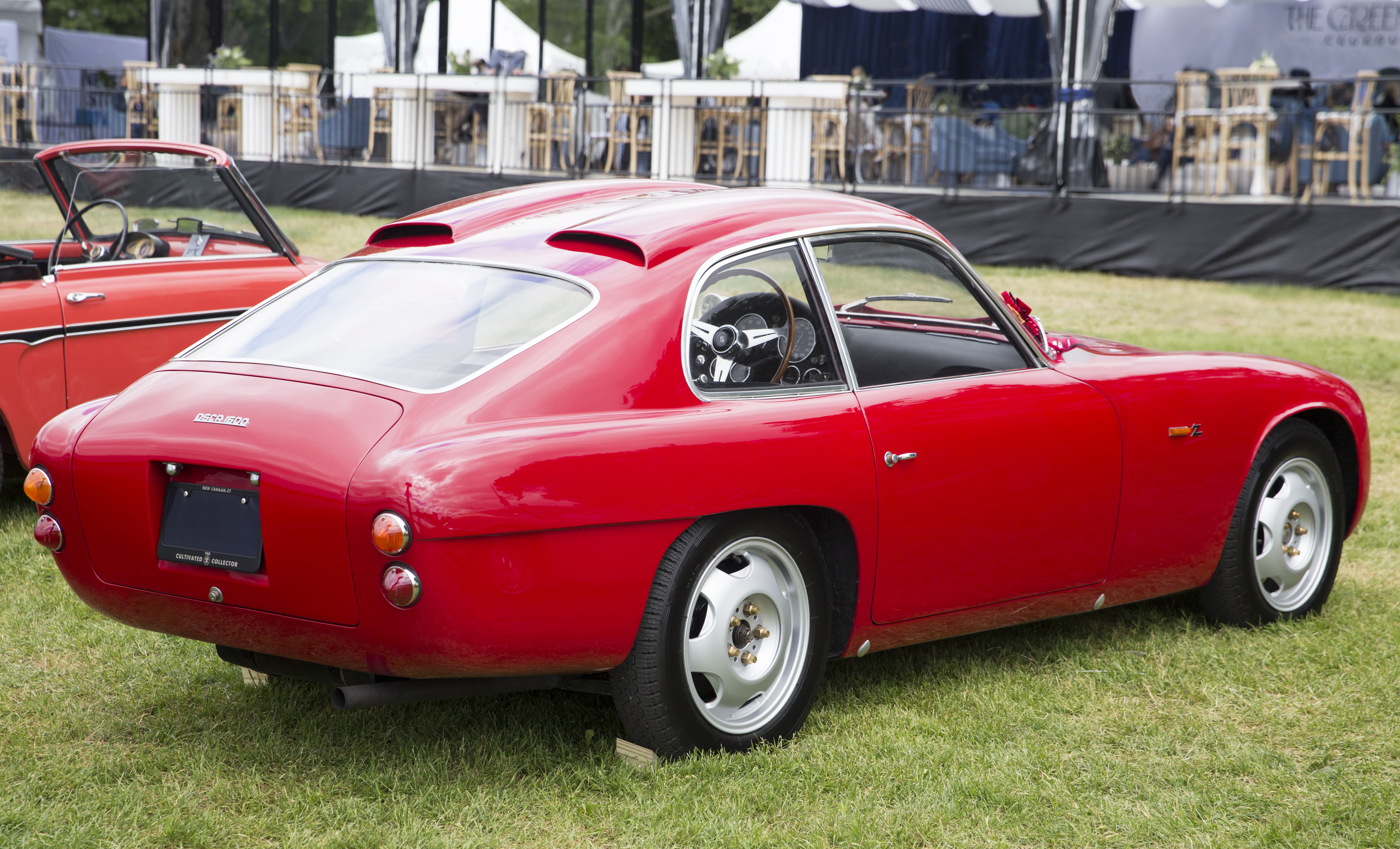
1962 OSCA 1600 GTS by Zagato; rear view

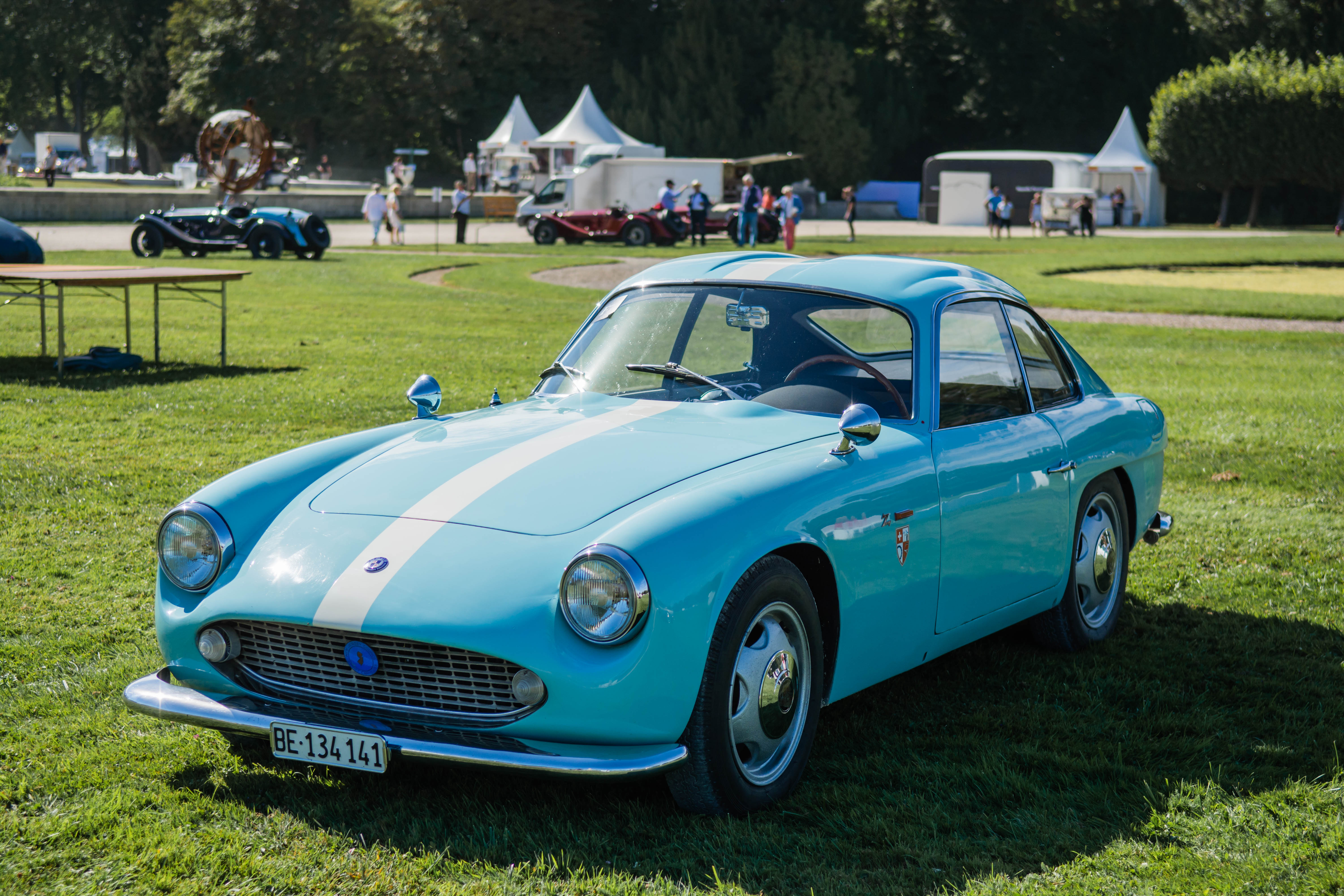
1965 OSCA 1600 GT by Zagato

=== OSCA 2500GT Dromos (1998) ===
In 1998, a partnership was formed between Andrea Zagato (grandson of Ugo Zagato) and Japanese investor Shozo Fujita, with the intent of reviving historical Italian car brands. In 1999, the OSCA 2500GT Dromos was revealed. Designed by Ercole Spada, the car was constructed by Touring Superleggera and was built on a tubular frame chassis, with a DOHC Subaru boxer engine producing 187-horsepower. The project never progressed beyond the prototype stage.

== Vehicles ==
Name and year of introduction:

- OSCA MT4 (1947)
- OSCA S187 (1956)
- OSCA 750S (1957)
- OSCA 1050 Spider
- OSCA 1100 FJ (for Formula Junior)
- OSCA 1100 (1960)
- OSCA 2000 Desmodromico (Morelli, 1959/60)
- OSCA 1600 GT/GT2/GTS (1962)
- OSCA 1600 SP (1963)
- OSCA 2500GT Dromos (1998)

== Complete Formula One World Championship results ==
OSCA as a Formula One chassis constructor
Formula One World Championship career
- Engines: OSCA
- Entrants: OSCA, Élie Bayol, Louis Chiron
- First entry: 1951 Italian Grand Prix
- Last entry: 1958 Monaco Grand Prix
- Races entered: 7 (4 starts)
- Race victories: 0
- Constructors' Championships: 0
- Drivers' Championships: 0
- Points: 0
- Pole positions: 0
- Fastest laps: 0

OSCA as a Formula One engine manufacturer
Formula One World Championship career
- First entry: 1951 Italian Grand Prix
- Last entry: 1962 Italian Grand Prix
- Races entered: 12 (8 starts)
- Chassis: OSCA, Maserati, Cooper, De Tomaso
- Constructors' Championships: 0
- Drivers' Championships: 0
- Race victories: 0
- Podiums: 0
- Points: 0
- Pole positions: 0
- Fastest laps: 0

=== As a constructor ===
(key) (results in bold indicate pole position; results in italics indicate fastest lap)

Year	Entrant	Chassis	Engine	Tyres	Driver	1	2	3	4	5	6	7	8	9	10	11	WCC	Points
1951	OSCA Automobili	4500G	4500 4.5 V12	P		SUI	500	BEL	FRA	GBR	GER	ITA	ESP				—N/a^{1}	
1951	OSCA Automobili	4500G	4500 4.5 V12	P	(Italy) Franco Rol							9					—N/a^{1}	
1952	Élie Bayol	20	2000 2.0 L6	P		SUI	500	BEL	FRA	GBR	GER	NED	ITA				—N/a^{1}	
1952	Élie Bayol	20	2000 2.0 L6	P	(France) Élie Bayol								Ret				—N/a^{1}	
1953	Louis Chiron	20	2000 2.0 L6	P		ARG	500	NED	BEL	FRA	GBR	GER	SUI	ITA			—N/a^{1}	
1953	Louis Chiron	20	2000 2.0 L6	P	(Monaco) Louis Chiron					15	DNS		DNS	10			—N/a^{1}	
1953	Élie Bayol	20	2000 2.0 L6	P	(France) Élie Bayol					Ret			DNS	Ret			—N/a^{1}	
1958	OSCA Automobili	F2/S	372 1.5 L4	P		ARG	MON	NED	500	BEL	FRA	GBR	GER	POR	ITA	MOR	NC	0
1958	OSCA Automobili	F2/S	372 1.5 L4	P	(Italy) Giulio Cabianca		DNQ										NC	0
1958	OSCA Automobili	F2/S	372 1.5 L4	P	(Italy) Luigi Piotti		DNQ										NC	0

=== As an engine supplier ===
(key) (Races in bold indicate pole position; races in italics indicate fastest lap)

Year	Entrant	Chassis	Engine	Tyres	Drivers	1	2	3	4	5	6	7	8	9	WCC	Points
1951	Prince Bira	Maserati 4CLT/48	4500 4.5 V12	P		SUI	500	BEL	FRA	GBR	GER	ITA	ESP		—N/a^{1}	
1951	Prince Bira	Maserati 4CLT/48	4500 4.5 V12	P	(Thailand) B. Bira								Ret		—N/a^{1}	
1959	OSCA Automobili	Cooper T43	2.0 L4	D		MON	500	NED	FRA	GBR	GER	POR	ITA	USA	NC	0
1959	OSCA Automobili	Cooper T43	2.0 L4	D	(Argentina) Alejandro de Tomaso									Ret	NC	0
1961	Scuderia Serenissima	De Tomaso F1	372 1.5 L4	D		MON	NED	BEL	FRA	GBR	GER	ITA	USA		NC	0
1961	Scuderia Serenissima	De Tomaso F1	372 1.5 L4	D	(Italy) Giorgio Scarlatti				Ret						NC	0
1961	Scuderia Settecolli	De Tomaso F1	372 1.5 L4	D	(Italy) Roberto Lippi							Ret			NC	0
1962	Scuderia Settecolli	De Tomaso F1	372 1.5 L4	D		NED	MON	BEL	FRA	GBR	GER	ITA	USA	RSA	NC	0
1962	Scuderia Settecolli	De Tomaso F1	372 1.5 L4	D	(Italy) Roberto Lippi							DNQ			NC	0

Notes

- **^1** – The Constructors World Championship did not exist before 1958.

== OSCA brand (2026) ==
In 2022, the rights to the OSCA brand were passed by Alfieri Maserati to Massimo Di Risio, owner of DR Automobiles. In 2026, the re-established company revealed the OSCA MT6, an SUV based on a Changan platform and designed in collaboration with Italdesign. OSCA also revealed that a mid-engine supercar was planned, likely based on the Lotus Emira.

== Vehicles ==
Name and year of introduction:

- OSCA MT6 (2026)
- OSCA MT8 (2027)
