= 1926 German Grand Prix =

Race details
- Date: 11 July 1926
- Official name: I Großer Preis von Deutschland
- Location: AVUS, Berlin, Germany
- Course: Permanent racing facility
- Course length: 19.573 km (12.162 miles)
- Distance: 20 laps, 392.29 km (243.76 miles)

Fastest lap
Driver	(Italy) Ferdinando Minoia	OM 665
- Time: 7'17.6

Podium
First	(Germany) Rudolf Caracciola	Mercedes "Monza"
Second	(Germany) Christian Riecken	NAG
Third	(Germany) Willy Cleer	Alfa-Romeo

The 1926 German Grand Prix was an auto race held at the AVUS track on 11 July 1926. It was the first ever German Grand Prix. The race was held in heavy rain, and was won by Germany's native son, Rudolf Caracciola.

Recognising a lack of available vehicles for the new Grand Prix formula (for example, the 1926 French Grand Prix had just three starters), the organisers decided to admit a diverse field vaguely described as sports cars. These were divided into three classes based on engine capacity: Class D (2L-3L), Class E (1.5L-2L) and Class F (1.1L to 1.5L). The race start was staggered, with class D released first, followed by class E, and finally class F, at 2-minute intervals.

The race was marred by an accident involving driver Adolf Rosenberger, whose car crashed into one of the marshals' huts, killing three people.

The German Grand Prix would not return to the AVUS track until 1959.

== Classification ==
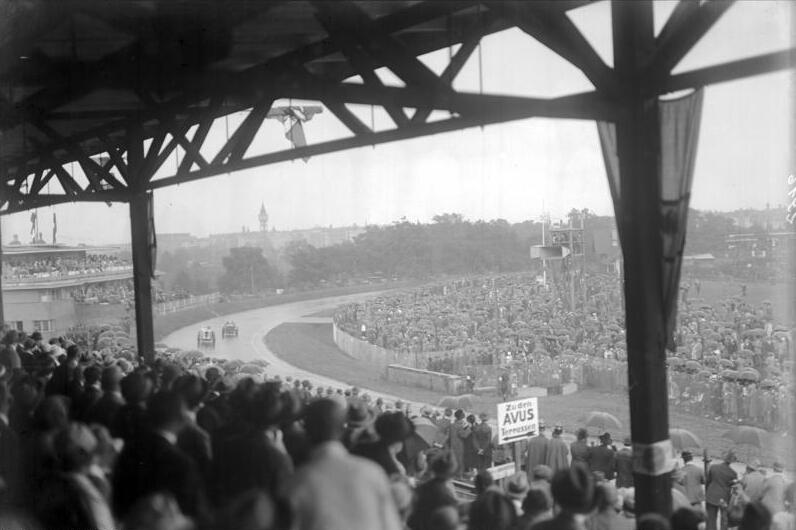
A look at the crowd

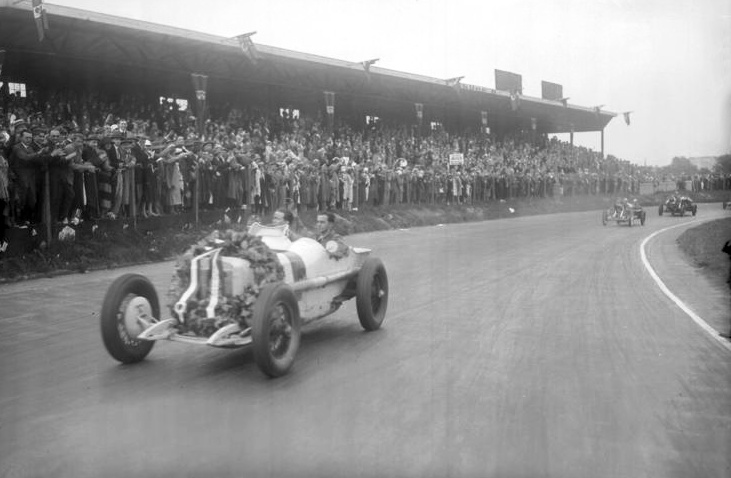
Winner Rudolf Caracciola in a parade lap

Pos	No	Class	Driver	Car	Laps	Time/Retired
1	14	E	(Germany) Rudolf Caracciola	Mercedes	20	2:54'12.8
2	5	D	(Germany) Christian Riecken	NAG	20	2:57'33.2
3	7	D	(Germany) Willi Cleer	Alfa Romeo RLSS	20	3:00'16.8
4	20	E	(France) Pierre Clause	Bignan	20	3:02'07.4
5	32	F	(Germany) Georg Klöbe	NSU	20	3:07'27.0
6	16	E	(Germany) Max zu Schaumburg-Lippe	OM 665	20	3:10'57.4
7	28	F	(Germany) Jakob Scholl	NSU	20	3:11'54.2
8	37	F	(Germany) Franz Islinger	NSU	20	3:13'58.8
9	23	E	(Germany) Hans Santner	OM 665	20	3:16'54.2
10	54	F	(Germany) Josef Müller	NSU	20	3:18'25.4
11	44	E	(Germany) Hans Bakasch	Brennabor	20	3:21'26.2
12	41	E	(Germany) Edard Reichstein	Brennabor	20	3:26'33.8
13	10	D	(Germany) Fritz Feldmann	Hansa	20	3:27'45.8
14	9	D	(Germany) Erwin Orska	NAG	20	3:28'11.0
15	25	E	(Germany) Fritz Mitzlaff	Brennabor	20	3:29'01.6
16	42	F	(Germany) Hugo Urban-Emmerich	Talbot	20	3:29'37.8
17	33	F	(Germany) Max Wälti	Bugatti	20	3:31'17.8
DNF	24	F	(Germany) Hans Hanft	Bugatti	17	
DNF	31	F	(Germany) Hermann Friedrich	Pluto	16	
DNF	38	F	(Germany) Georg Kimpel	Bugatti	16	Conrod
DNF	15	E	(Germany) Josef Ludwig	Bugatti	15	
DNF	4	D	(Germany) Paul von Guillaume	Austro-Daimler	14	
DNF	18	E	(Germany) Otto Komnick	Komnick	13	Conrod
DNF	4	D	(Germany) Carl Deilmann	Austro-Daimler	12	
DNF	13	E	(Germany) Rudolf Breier	Bugatti	9	
DNF	36	F	(France) Jean Chassagne	Talbot	8	Accident
DNF	26	F	(Germany) Alfred Mederer	Pluto	8	Accident
DNF	40	F	(Germany) R. van Horn	GM	8	Broken valve
DNF	19	E	(Germany) Adolf Rosenberger	Mercedes	6	Accident
DNF	27	F	(Italy) Ferdinando Minoia	OM 865	6	Tyres, engine
DNF	1	D	(Germany) Hans Lohmann	Komnick	6	
DNF	2	D	(Germany) Hans Berthold	NAG	5	
DNF	8	D	(Germany) R. C. Krüger	Alfa Romeo	3	Clutch
DNF	45	F	(Germany) Willy Loge	AGA	2	Radiator
DNF	3	D	(Germany) Ernst Hofer	Steiger	1	Radiator
DNF	30	F	(Germany) Max Georg Fielder	BFA	1	Flat tyre
DNF	34	F	(Germany) Otto Fettkenheur	Bob	0	Retired
DNF	46	F	(Germany) Heinz Erblich	Alfi	0	Retired
DNS	11	D	(Germany) Wilhelm Heine	NAG		Accident in practice
DNS	12	E	Arno Hänsel	Bugatti		Engine
DNS	21	E	(Germany) Hans Kolb	Bugatti		Engine
DNS	35	F	(Italy) Luigi "Gigi" Platé	Chiribiri		Accident in practice
DNS	39	F	(Germany) August Momberger	NSU		Engine
DNS	43	F	Cord von Einem	Pluto		Engine

Grand Prix Race
1926 Grand Prix season
Previous race: None	German Grand Prix	Next race: 1927 German Grand Prix
