= Otto Merz =

German racing driver and chauffeur

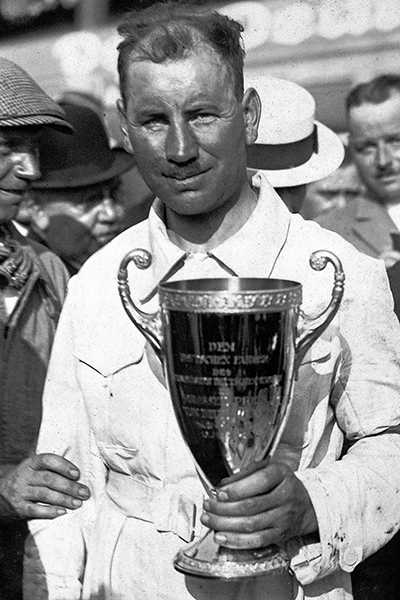
- Merz in 1928
- Born: 12 June 1889; Esslingen am Neckar, Kingdom of Württemberg
- Died: 18 May 1933 (aged 43); Berlin, Germany
- Occupations: Racing driver, chauffeur

Otto Merz was a German racing driver, chauffeur and mechanic. He was a driver in the motorcade during the 1914 assassination of Archduke Franz Ferdinand and later won the second running of the German Grand Prix in 1927. He died in a crash during practice for the 1933 Avusrennen in a modified Mercedes SSK on 18 May 1933.

== Early life ==
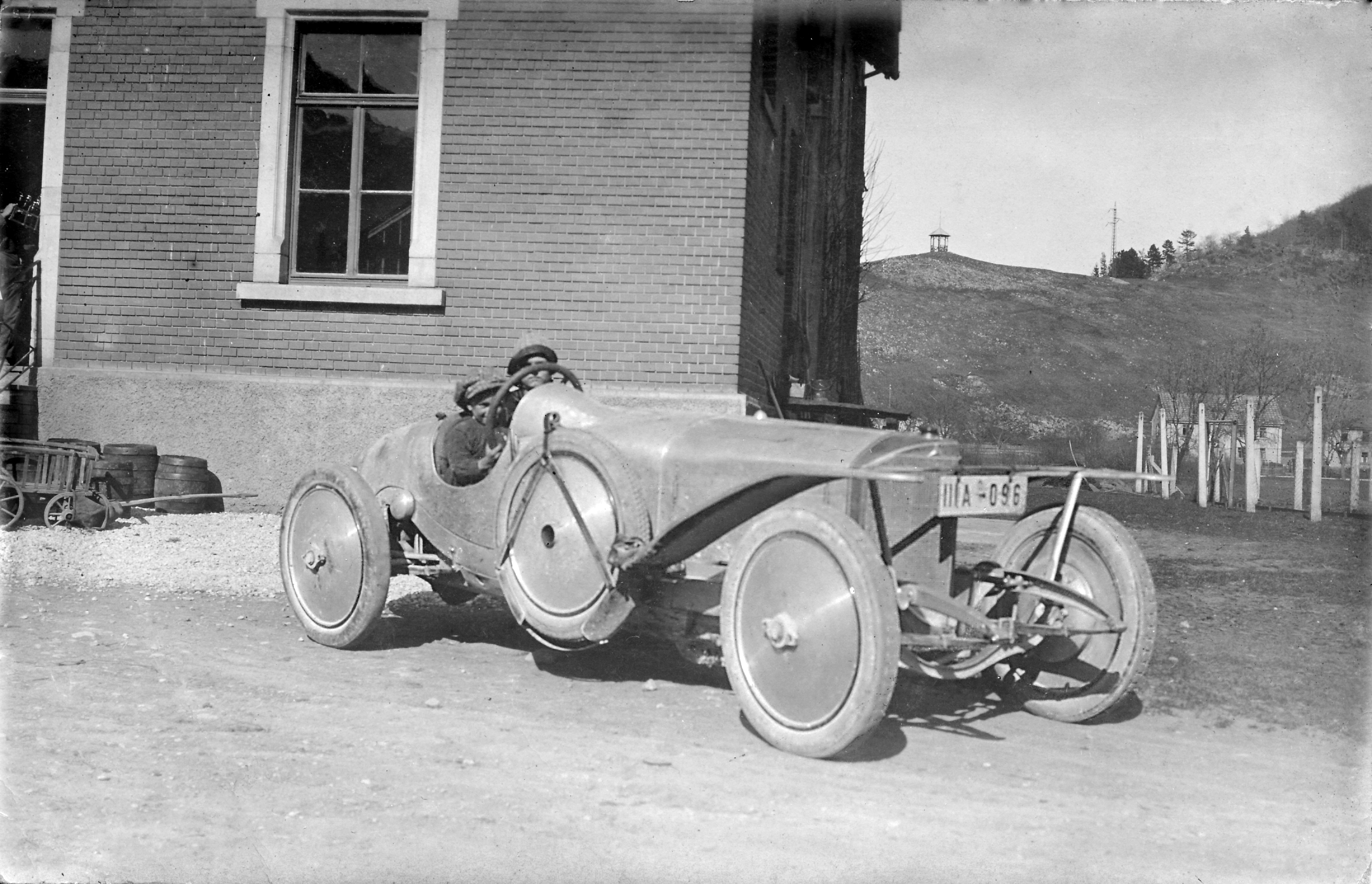
Otto Merz' wife and daughter in his racing car in front of the Schelklingen cement factory canteen where his father-in-law was leaseholder (1923)

Otto Merz was born on 12 June 1889 in Esslingen am Neckar to Karl Gottlob Merz, a locksmith, and Christine Margarete Merz née Blessing.

In 1906, Merz was hired by Daimler as a mechanic. He also served as a chauffeur and mechanic for several wealthy motor car enthusiasts, such as Theodore Dreher, the Austrian motor sport sponsor and son of Anton Dreher, and the Saxon industrialist Willy Pöge.

=== Assassination of Archduke Franz Ferdinand ===
On 28 June 1914, as the chauffeur for Count Alexander von Boos-Waldeck during Archduke Franz Ferdinand and his wife Sophie's visit to Sarajevo, Merz drove the third car in the motorcade. There were two attempts on the archduke's life that day. In the first one, Nedeljko Čabrinović threw a bomb with a 12-second fuse at the archduke's car, which was first in the motorcade, which bounced off and rolled under the wheels of Merz' car where it exploded, injuring Boos-Waldeck, Eric von Merizzi and a number of spectators.

Later in the day, after the archduke's chauffeur Leopold Ljoka took a wrong turn on their way to visit the wounded at the hospital, Gavrilo Princip stepped up to the archduke's car and fired twice, killing the archduke and his wife.

== Racing career ==
Merz took up on racing in the early 1920s and achieved victories at both Solitude Racetrack and at the Klausen hill climb in 1924. He followed this up with a 1925 victory at the Solitude Ring, a closed road course around Castle Solitude, in a four-cylinder two litre Mercedes. He repeated the victory there in 1926 at an average speed of 57.29 mph (92.20 km/h), in an ill-handling Porsche-designed straight-eight Mercedes.

In July 1927, he won the German Grand Prix at the newly opened Nürburgring in a Mercedes SSK. He raced against many 499 cc (30.5 cu in) one-cylinder Hanomags and beat his teammate, Christian Werner, by three minutes over the 316 mi (509 km) race. The following year, in "sweltering" heat, the competition included several Bugatti Type 35s, and top-ranked drivers including Tazio Nuvolari, Louis Chiron, and Achille Varzi. Merz came in second place, while several drivers succumbed to the heat, including Rudolf Caracciola, who took over from Christian Werner and Willy Walb. Since Werner shared the driving duties with both Caracciola and Walb, he is credited with a share of first and third places. Merz was the sole driver of the Mercedes Benz SS for the 18 laps of the daunting Nürbrugring Nordschleife, at racing pace, an achievement for which he was widely praised. This tour de force, his amusing ability to hammer nails through wood with his bare hands, together with his reported attempt to rescue Franz Ferdinand fourteen years earlier, forged the imagery of Metz the colossus, as he became known.

These wins did not catapult Merz into a full-time racing career; he participated in races on occasion, such as in the 1929 Tourist Trophy in Ireland, won by his teammate Caracciola; that year's Ulster Tourist Trophy was less auspicious, for the Caracciola/Merz Mercedes came 13th. Merz was usually listed only as a reserve driver, but he did see action at the International Alpine Trial and at the ADAC long distance trials. In 1931 he shared Caracciola's Mercedes-Benz SSKL in the French Grand Prix at Montlhéry, a grueling ten-hour race in the full 12.5 km (7.8 mi) circuit, but the car's supercharger failed after 39 laps. That same year, Merz obtained a fifth place at the German Grand Prix at Nürburgring in anSSKL. The six points he scored with Caracciola at the French Grand Prix – the duo completed one-third of the race – tied them for 51st place in the final classification table of the European Championship, won that year by Ferdinando Minoia. The following year, Mercedes stayed away from the racing circles, and Merz continued to work at the firm as an experimental and test driver. Even though Mercedes was officially on hiatus, Merz was entered as an alternative driver for the German Grand Prix, but did not take part.

Mercedes-Benz returned to racing in 1933; the company's management wanted to win the AVUS race; that event, to be held on 21 May in the German capital, was to be attended by high government dignitaries and would be a great opportunity to demonstrate Mercedes' technical prowess. Taking the 9 km (5.6 mi)-long straights of the Berlin track into consideration, the Mercedes-Benz team produced a streamlined SSKL for the occasion. Caracciola, who was back to the firm, would be the first choice to drive it, but he was still in the hospital, convalescing from fractures and injuries suffered during a practice accident for the Monaco Grand Prix on 23 April in a privateer Alfa Romeo. Under such circumstances, Merz had the SSKL seat in the AVUS race. Possibly he was invited by the team to drive: Merz had been a popular employee since 1906, and was in good standing with the management; it is also possible that Merz offered his services. Although only 43, he had semi-retired from racing, but enjoyed driving and may have considered this race as his last chance to compete in a widely publicized event. Whatever the reason, Mercedes outsiders were surprised to see Merz in the car.

== Death ==
The first official practice session for the 1933 Avusrennen took place on 18 May 1933. A heavy rain drenched the track, and Daimler Benz drivers Merz and Manfred von Brauchitsch wanted to try their heavy SSK streamliners under those conditions. Witnesses reported the cars were sliding in several locations on the track and it was very difficult to drive.

A few minutes after 13:00, Merz crashed his SSK on the long straight, overturning near the Grunewald station and nearly 2 km (1.2 mi) from the finish line. At the place of the accident, the surface changed from cobblestones to tarmac, and traces of the car trajectory were clearly visible on the cobblestones - but suddenly ended. The next mark left by the vehicle was found 36 m (39 yd) further on, where the car hit the ground again. The Mercedes-Benz crashed into a cement milestone on the right side of the track, and, according to the single eye-witness, it somersaulted and rolled several times. The car stopped with its wheels in the air near an embankment. Ejected from the car, rescuers found Merz on his back on the right side of the track. He was transported to the Hildegard Hospital at Charlottenburg, a suburb of Berlin and very near the accident site, but his condition was beyond help.

=== Cause of accident ===
Investigators later concluded Merz had lost control for a few moments. A fundamental difference between Brauchitsch's and Merz's Mercedes was determined to have caused the accident. Brauchitsch's had a differently streamlined body than Merz's: on the Brauchitzch SSK, modified by König-Fachsenfeld, the tail comes a high point. Mercedes had modified Merz's SSK differently, and the Sindelfingen-made body of Merz's car curved down markedly at the rear, a configuration much more likely to create substantial lift. The characteristics of the accident, and the fact it happened in an untested vehicle, has led many experts, including Karl Ludwigsen, to believe the aerodynamic configuration of Merz's car may have played an important role in this tragedy.

== Personal life ==
On 19 October 1918 in Schelklingen, Otto Merz married Maria Hoch, who was born in Allmendingen on 22 January 1889 to Leo Hoch and Maria Hoch née Autenrieth. Otto and Maria were of Protestant faith.

== Racing record ==
Date	Event	Team	Position
17 May 1925	1925 Solitude Grand Prix	Daimler Motoren Gesellschaft	1st
12 September 1926	1926 Solitude Grand Prix	Daimler Motoren Gesellschaft	1st
17 July 1927	1927 German Grand Prix	Daimler Benz	1st
15 July 1928	1928 German Grand Prix	Daimler Benz	2nd
21 June 1931	1931 French Grand Prix	Private entry	Ret
19 July 1931	1931 German Grand Prix	Daimler Benz	5th
