= 1960 German Grand Prix =

Race details
- Date: 31 July 1960
- Official name: XXII Grosser Preis von Deutschland
- Location: Nürburgring; Nürburg, West Germany
- Course: Public road/Permanent racing facility
- Course length: 7.7 km (4.7 miles)
- Distance: 32 laps, 250.2 km (155.47 miles)
- Weather: Heavy Rain

Pole position
Driver	(Sweden) Jo Bonnier	Porsche
- Time: 3:08.0

Fastest lap
Driver	(Sweden) Jo Bonnier	Porsche
- Time: 3:29.9

Podium
First	(Sweden) Jo Bonnier	Porsche
Second	(West Germany) Wolfgang von Trips	Porsche
Third	(Australia) Jack Brabham	Cooper-Climax

The 1960 German Grand Prix was a Formula Two race held on 31 July 1960 at Nürburgring. This was the only year the German Grand Prix was run on the shorter Südschleife layout.

Due to decreasing attendances after the departure of Mercedes-Benz, and the controversial 1959 race at AVUS, it was decided to race on the shorter layout to give spectators a better show (seeing the cars do more laps), and the race was run to Formula Two regulations, which were set to replace Formula One for 1961 anyway, since German manufacturer Porsche had a strong Formula Two car.

This race was also the fifth and final race of the 1960 Formula Two Constructors' Championship and Formula Two Drivers' Championship.

== Classification ==
=== Starting grid ===
Pos	No	Driver	Constructor	Time
1	6	(Sweden) Jo Bonnier	Porsche	3:08.0
2	9	(West Germany) Wolfgang von Trips	Porsche	3:09.6
3	1	(Australia) Jack Brabham	Cooper-Climax	3:10.0
4	8	(United Kingdom) Graham Hill	Porsche	3:10.2
5	14	(West Germany) Hans Herrmann	Porsche	3:10.8
DNS	15	(United States) Masten Gregory	Cooper-Maserati	Unknown
7	7	(West Germany) Edgar Barth	Porsche	3:13.5
8	21	(United States) Dan Gurney	Lotus-Climax	3:13.9
9	2	(New Zealand) Bruce McLaren	Cooper-Climax	3:14.3
10	11	(United Kingdom) Innes Ireland	Lotus-Climax	3:14.2
11	3	(France) Maurice Trintignant	Cooper-Climax	3:15.3
12	27	(United Kingdom) Jack Lewis	Cooper-Climax	3:17.8
13	29	(New Zealand) George Lawton	Cooper-Climax	3:18.7
14	25	(United Kingdom) Tony Marsh	Cooper-Climax	3:19.0
15	20	(West Germany) Wolfgang Seidel	Cooper-Climax	3:19.4
16	4	(Belgium) Olivier Gendebien	Cooper-Climax	3:19.4
17	26	(France) Gérard Laureau	Cooper-Climax	3:22.1
18	22	(Netherlands) Carel Godin de Beaufort	Cooper-Climax	3:22.1
19	23	(Belgium) Lucien Bianchi	Cooper-Climax	3:22.4
20	28	(France) Jo Schlesser	Cooper-Climax	3:23.5
21	24	(United Kingdom) Henry Taylor	Laystall-Climax	3:28.0

Start featured a 4-3-4-3-4-3 layout, with Gregory's spot left vacant.

=== Race ===
Pos	No	Driver	Constructor	Laps	Time/Retired	Grid
1	6	(Sweden) Jo Bonnier	Porsche	32	1:55:12.1	1
2	9	(West Germany) Wolfgang von Trips	Porsche	32	1:55:13.4	2
3	1	(Australia) Jack Brabham	Cooper-Climax	32	1:57:15.1	3
4	8	(United Kingdom) Graham Hill	Porsche	32	1:57:21.2	4
5	14	(West Germany) Hans Herrmann	Porsche	32	1:57:29.2	5
6	7	(West Germany) Edgar Barth	Porsche	32	1:57:32.3	7
7	11	(United Kingdom) Innes Ireland	Lotus-Climax	31	+1 Lap	10
8	21	(United States) Dan Gurney	Lotus-Climax	31	+1 Lap	8
9	2	(New Zealand) Bruce McLaren	Cooper-Climax	31	+1 Lap	9
10	25	(United Kingdom) Tony Marsh	Cooper-Climax	30	+2 Laps	14
11	20	(West Germany) Wolfgang Seidel	Cooper-Climax	30	+2 Laps	15
12	26	(France) Gérard Laureau	Cooper-Climax	30	+2 Laps	17
13	24	(United Kingdom) Henry Taylor	Laystall-Climax	29	+3 Laps	21
14	22	(Netherlands) Carel Godin de Beaufort	Cooper-Climax	29	+3 Laps	18
15	28	(France) Jo Schlesser	Cooper-Climax	27	+5 Laps	20
DNF	23	(Belgium) Lucien Bianchi	Cooper-Climax	19	Main bearing cap	19
DNF	4	(Belgium) Olivier Gendebien	Cooper-Climax	5	Clutch	16
DNF	3	(France) Maurice Trintignant	Cooper-Climax	5	Valve trouble	11
DNF	29	(New Zealand) George Lawton	Cooper-Climax	4	Engine	13
DSQ	27	(United Kingdom) Jack Lewis	Cooper-Climax	0	Outside Assistance	12
DNS	15	(United States) Masten Gregory	Cooper-Maserati	0	Accident in practice	6

Grand Prix Race
1960 Grand Prix season
Previous race: 1959 German Grand Prix	German Grand Prix	Next race: 1961 German Grand Prix
