= 1959 German Grand Prix =

← Previous race	Next race →

Race details
- Date: 2 August 1959
- Official name: XXI Grosser Preis von Deutschland
- Location: AVUS; West Berlin
- Course: Public road/Permanent racing facility
- Course length: 8.300 km (5.157 miles)
- Distance: 2x30 laps, 498.00 km (309.42 miles)
- Weather: Dry and dull.

Pole position
Driver	(United Kingdom) Tony Brooks	Ferrari
- Time: 2:05.9

Fastest lap
Driver	(United Kingdom) Tony Brooks	Ferrari
- Time: 2:04.5

Podium
First	(United Kingdom) Tony Brooks	Ferrari
Second	(United States) Dan Gurney	Ferrari
Third	(United States) Phil Hill	Ferrari

The 1959 German Grand Prix was a Formula One motor race held at the Automobil-Verkehrs- und Übungs-Straße in West Berlin on 2 August 1959. It was race 6 of 9 in the 1959 World Championship of Drivers and race 5 of 8 in the 1959 International Cup for Formula One Manufacturers. It was the 21st German Grand Prix and was only the second time the race was not held at the Nürburgring which opened in 1927, the year after the first German GP at AVUS. As of 2026, this is the only official German Grand Prix in World Championship history not to be held at either the Nürburgring or Hockenheimring as a venue.

The race in the divided city, yet before the Berlin Wall was built in 1961, would mark the only time that AVUS would host a World Championship Grand Prix since the inception in 1950 of what is today referred to as the Formula One World Championship. AVUS had previously held the original German Grand Prix in 1926 though the circuit had held the Avusrennen a few times times in the intervening years and continued to do so after this for lower category formula racing cars and sports cars until the circuit officially closed in 1998, though it would never host a World Championship Grand Prix ever again. The 1959 German Grand Prix was held over two 30 lap heats of the eight kilometre circuit for a total race distance of 498 kilometres.

In a unique Formula One race format, first, second and third were all claimed by the same team, Scuderia Ferrari. British driver Tony Brooks set the second fastest practice time, and started from pole. His teammate Cliff Allison was 0.1 quicker at 2:05.8, but only a reserve entrant in the 4th Ferrari. When allowed to start after two Formula 2 Porsches withdrew after the fatal crash of Jean Behra, it was only from the back of the field. Brooks won on aggregate, ahead of American teammates Dan Gurney and Phil Hill. All three drove Ferrari Dino 246s.

== Race report ==
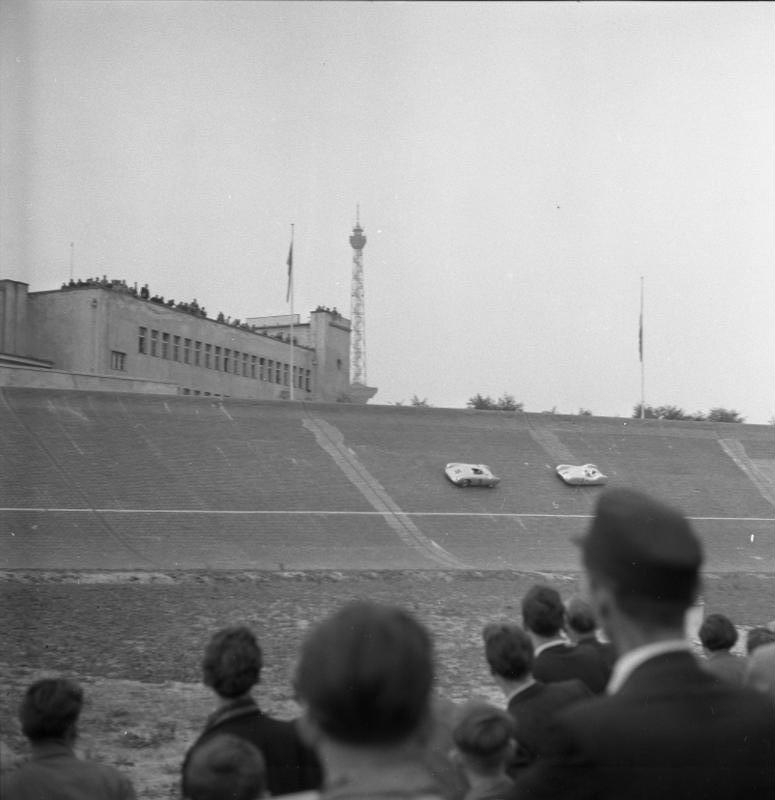
AVUS banked North turn in the 1955 race

The simplistic track consisted of two very longs straight down either side of a dual carriageway, punctuated at the Southern end by a hairpin and at the Northern by a steep banking made of bricks. AVUS was perhaps the fastest motor racing circuit in the world at the time- it was even faster than the Indianapolis oval which did not require hard braking. Tony Brooks started from pole position and then beat his practice time with the fastest lap, at average speed of 149 mph (240 km/h)- extremely fast for Formula One at the time and 4 mph faster than the pole speed at Indianapolis that year.

Also uniquely in Formula One World Championship history, the race was divided into two heats, due to safety concerns about tire wear, having only left turns. In the first, Tony Brooks and Dan Gurney took the lead. Masten Gregory in the Cooper-Climax battled hard with them, passing first one Ferrari then the other as the lead changed hands until a big end bolt broke. It was a Ferrari 1-2-3 with Phil Hill taking the final podium place. In the second heat, once again the Ferraris had a duel at the front, this time with Bruce McLaren until he suffered transfer gear problems. On aggregate placings, it was an all-Ferrari podium in the order Brooks, Gurney, Hill. Maurice Trintignant was fourth from Jo Bonnier and Ian Burgess. This was the fastest Formula One race recorded at this time, with an average speed of 143.3 miles per hour. Hans Herrmann crashed his BRM P25 five laps into the second heat. In the approach to the southern turn he struck hay bales and rolled his car, but was thrown clear and sent sliding down the track. While the car was destroyed, Herrmann escaped unscathed. Because of this incredible luck Herrmann got his nickname 'Hans im Glück'.

Former Ferrari driver Frenchman Jean Behra was due to race his Behra-Porsche Special in the Grand Prix but Behra was killed the day before racing a Porsche RSK in the Formula 2 support race at the same venue.

The results show evidence of the inconsistency with which rules were applied in this era. According to Formula One rules of the day, those drivers who retired before the end of the Grand Prix should only be classified if they pushed the car over the line after the finish. This rule was not applied to Harry Schell, who retired some 11 laps before the end. However, the rule was applied in other races, such as the 1960 Belgian Grand Prix. The rules were later clarified in 1966.

Brooks' win allowed him to close to within four points of championship leader, Australian Cooper racer Jack Brabham.

== Classification ==
=== Qualifying ===
Pos	No	Driver	Constructor	Time	Gap
1	4	(United Kingdom) Tony Brooks	Ferrari	2:05.9	—
2	7	(United Kingdom) Stirling Moss	Cooper-Climax	2:06.8	+0.9
3	6	(United States) Dan Gurney	Ferrari	2:07.2	+1.3
4	1	(Australia) Jack Brabham	Cooper-Climax	2:07.4	+1.5
5	3	(United States) Masten Gregory	Cooper-Climax	2:07.5	+1.6
6	5	(United States) Phil Hill	Ferrari	2:07.6	+1.7
7	9	(Sweden) Jo Bonnier	BRM	2:10.3	+4.4
8	10	(United States) Harry Schell	BRM	2:10.3	+4.4
9	2	(New Zealand) Bruce McLaren	Cooper-Climax	2:10.4	+4.5
10	16	(United Kingdom) Graham Hill	Lotus-Climax	2:10.8	+4.9
11	11	(West Germany) Hans Herrmann	BRM	2:11.4	+5.5
12	8	(France) Maurice Trintignant	Cooper-Climax	2:12.7	+6.8
13	15	(United Kingdom) Innes Ireland	Lotus-Climax	2:14.6	+8.7
14	17	(United Kingdom) Cliff Allison^{1}	Ferrari	2:05.8	—
15	18	(United Kingdom) Ian Burgess^{1}	Cooper-Maserati	2:18.9	+13.0
DNS	12	(France) Jean Behra	Behra-Porsche-Porsche	—	—
DNS	14	(West Germany) Wolfgang von Trips	Porsche	—	—

^1 — Cliff Allison and Ian Burgess were listed as reserve drivers for the race. They were only allowed to start the race after Porsche withdrew following Jean Behra's fatal accident. Allison had set fastest time in practice but had to start from the back of the grid while Brooks was on pole.

=== Race ===
==== Heat 1 ====
Pos	No	Driver	Constructor	Laps	Time/Retired	Grid
1	4	(United Kingdom) Tony Brooks	Ferrari	30	1:03:17.6	1
2	6	(United States) Dan Gurney	Ferrari	30	+ 1.3	3
3	5	(United States) Phil Hill	Ferrari	30	+ 1:04.5	6
4	2	(New Zealand) Bruce McLaren	Cooper-Climax	29	+ 1 Lap	9
5	10	(United States) Harry Schell	BRM	29	+ 1 Lap	8
6	8	(France) Maurice Trintignant	Cooper-Climax	29	+ 1 Lap	12
7	9	(Sweden) Jo Bonnier	BRM	29	+ 1 Lap	7
8	11	(West Germany) Hans Herrmann	BRM	29	+ 1 Lap	11
9	18	(United Kingdom) Ian Burgess	Cooper-Maserati	28	+ 2 Laps	9
Ret	3	(United States) Masten Gregory	Cooper-Climax	23	Engine	5
Ret	1	(Australia) Jack Brabham	Cooper-Climax	15	Transmission	4
Ret	16	(United Kingdom) Graham Hill	Lotus-Climax	10	Gearbox	10
Ret	15	(United Kingdom) Innes Ireland	Lotus-Climax	7	Crown wheel/pinion	13
Ret	17	(United Kingdom) Cliff Allison	Ferrari	2	Clutch	14
Ret	7	(United Kingdom) Stirling Moss	Cooper-Climax	1	Transmission	2

==== Heat 2 ====
After a break for tire changes and minor servicing, the nine cars that remained were lined up on the grid in finishing order of the first heat.

Pos	No	Driver	Constructor	Laps	Time/Retired	Grid
1	4	(United Kingdom) Tony Brooks	Ferrari	30	1:06:14.0	1
2	5	(United States) Phil Hill	Ferrari	30	+0.3	3
3	6	(United States) Dan Gurney	Ferrari	30	+0.6	2
4	8	(France) Maurice Trintignant	Cooper-Climax	30	+18.4	6
5	9	(Sweden) Jo Bonnier	BRM	29	+1 Lap	7
6	18	(United Kingdom) Ian Burgess	Cooper-Maserati	28	+2 Laps	9
7	10	(United States) Harry Schell	BRM	20	+10 Laps	5
Ret	2	(New Zealand) Bruce McLaren	Cooper-Climax	6	Transmission	4
Ret	11	(West Germany) Hans Herrmann	BRM	6	Accident	8

==== Aggregate ====
Pos	No	Driver	Constructor	Laps	Time/Retired	Grid	Points
1	4	(United Kingdom) Tony Brooks	Ferrari	60	2:09:31.6	1	9^{1}
2	6	(United States) Dan Gurney	Ferrari	60	+ 2.9	3	6
3	5	(United States) Phil Hill	Ferrari	60	+ 1:04.8	6	4
4	8	(France) Maurice Trintignant	Cooper-Climax	59	+ 1 Lap	12	3
5	9	(Sweden) Jo Bonnier	BRM	58	+ 2 Laps	7	2
6	18	(United Kingdom) Ian Burgess	Cooper-Maserati	56	+ 4 Laps	15	
7	10	(United States) Harry Schell	BRM	49	+ 11 Laps	8	
Ret	2	(New Zealand) Bruce McLaren	Cooper-Climax	36	Transmission	9	
Ret	11	(West Germany) Hans Herrmann	BRM	36	Accident	11	
Ret	3	(United States) Masten Gregory	Cooper-Climax	23	Engine	5	
Ret	1	(Australia) Jack Brabham	Cooper-Climax	15	Transmission	4	
Ret	16	(United Kingdom) Graham Hill	Lotus-Climax	10	Gearbox	10	
Ret	15	(United Kingdom) Innes Ireland	Lotus-Climax	7	Differential	13	
Ret	17	(United Kingdom) Cliff Allison	Ferrari	2	Clutch	14	
Ret	7	(United Kingdom) Stirling Moss	Cooper-Climax	1	Transmission	2	
DNS	12	(France) Jean Behra	Behra-Porsche-Porsche		Fatal accident in support race		
DNS	14	(West Germany) Wolfgang von Trips	Porsche		Withdrew		

Notes

- ^1 – Includes 1 point for fastest lap

== Championship standings after the race ==
Drivers' Championship standings

	Pos	Driver	Points
	1	(Australia) Jack Brabham	27
	2	(United Kingdom) Tony Brooks	23
	3	(United States) Phil Hill	13
2	4	(Sweden) Jo Bonnier	10
4	5	(France) Maurice Trintignant	9

Constructors' Championship standings

Pos	Constructor	Points
1	(United Kingdom) Cooper-Climax	29
2	(Italy) Ferrari	24
3	(United Kingdom) BRM	16
4	(United Kingdom) Lotus-Climax	3

- Notes: Only the top five positions are included for both sets of standings.

Previous race: 1959 British Grand Prix	FIA Formula One World Championship; 1959 season	Next race: 1959 Portuguese Grand Prix
Previous race: 1958 German Grand Prix	German Grand Prix	Next race: 1960 German Grand Prix
