= 1927 German Grand Prix =

Race details
- Date: 17 July 1927
- Official name: II Großer Preis von Deutschland
- Location: Nürburgring; Nürburg, Germany
- Course: Permanent racing facility
- Course length: 28.265 km (17.564 miles)
- Distance: 18 laps, 508.77 km (311.82 miles)

Podium
First	(Germany) Otto Merz	Daimler-Benz
Second	(Germany) Christian Werner	Daimler-Benz
Third	(Germany) Willy Walb	Daimler-Benz

The 1927 German Grand Prix was a Grand Prix motor race held at the Nürburgring. It was the first German Grand Prix held at the newly opened track. It used the combined Nordschleife and Südschleife layout.

== Summary ==
The race was split into three classes:

- 3,000+ cc engines
- 1,500-3,000 cc engines
- 1,500> cc engines

The Mercedes cars dominated the 3,000+ class, with the Bugatti of Junek and the Talbot of Urban-Emmerich winning their respective classes. The track proved to be difficult with many retirements, but praise was given for its racing spectacle.

== Classification ==
=== Race ===
Pos	Driver	Team	Car	Laps	Time/Retired
1	(Germany) Otto Merz	Daimler-Benz	Mercedes Benz S-Series	18	4:59:35.6
2	(Germany) Christian Werner	Daimler-Benz	Mercedes Benz S-Series	18	5:2:54
3	(Germany) Willy Walb	Daimler-Benz	Mercedes Benz S-Series	18	5:10:49
4	(Czechoslovakia) Elizabeth Junek	Private entry	Bugatti T35	18	5:40:7
5	(Czechoslovakia) Hugo Urban-Emmerich	Private entry	Talbot T70	18	6:0:32
6	(Germany) Willi Cleer	Private entry	Bugatti T37	18	6:7:11
7	(Germany) Paul von Guillaume	Private entry	Steyr VI Klausen	18	
Ret	(Germany) Georg Kimpel	Private entry	Mercedes Benz S-Series	17	
Ret	(Netherlands) Henny de Joncy	Private entry	BNC 527-SCAP	12	
Ret	(Germany) Harry Stumpf	Private entry	HAG-Gastell	10	
Ret	(Germany) Adolf Rosenberger	Private entry	Mercedes Benz S-Series	9	
Ret	Max zu Schaumburg-Lippe	Private entry			
Ret	Heinrich Dorper	Private entry	Opel	6	
Ret	(Germany) Rudolf Caracciola	Daimler-Benz	Mercedes Benz S-Series	5	
Ret	(Germany) Karl Kappler	Private entry	Bugatti T35C	5	
Ret	(Germany) Hans Simons	Private entry	OM 665	4	
Ret	(Germany) Eckert von Kalnein	Private entry	Bugatti T35B	4	
Ret	(France) Pierre Clause	Private entry	Bignan B	2	
Ret	Paul Reich	Private entry	Pluto	1	
Ret	(Germany) Hans Stuck	Private entry	Austro-Daimler ADR	0	
DSQ	(Germany) Franz Baader	Private entry	Bugatti T35C	17	
