= 1950 German Grand Prix =

Race details
- Date: 20 August 1950
- Official name: XIII Großer Preis von Deutschland
- Location: Nürburgring; Nürburg, Germany
- Course: Permanent racing facility
- Course length: 22.810 km (14.173 miles)
- Distance: 16 laps, 364.960 km (226.768 miles)
- Weather: Sunny, Dry, Warm
- Attendance: 400,000

Pole position
Driver	(Italy) Alberto Ascari	Scuderia Ferrari
- Time: 10:39.5

Fastest lap
Driver	(Italy) Alberto Ascari	Scuderia Ferrari
- Time: 10:43.6

Podium
First	(Italy) Alberto Ascari	Scuderia Ferrari
Second	(France) André Simon	Equipe Gordini
Third	(France) Maurice Trintignant	Equipe Gordini

The 1950 German Grand Prix was a non-championship Formula Two race held on 20 August 1950 at the Nürburgring Nordschleife.

== Report ==
Formula 2 regulations had been chosen in order to attract a larger starting grid – especially for German teams and drivers, who would not have had time to prepare cars for the still-new Formula One regulations. This resulted in a large amount of interest – 37 cars started the race, and the event drew a crowd of 400,000 spectators.

During practice, German driver Paul Greifzu was involved in an accident where his car hit a paramedic at Pflanzgarten. The paramedic suffered fatal injuries and Greifzu was taken to hospital with fractured ribs and internal bruising.

The Grand Prix had attracted some of the top German drivers, but many of them retired due to the high level of attrition. Indeed, only 10 drivers completed the full distance. Hans Stuck ran sixth after the first lap, but had to stop to fix a stuck throttle. He received outside assistance whilst starting his engine again, and was disqualified. Manfred von Brauchitsch put in a fine performance trying to keep up with the leaders, running as high as seventh before retiring with engine failure.

The race was dominated by Alberto Ascari, who led from pole and pulled away comfortably each lap. The only slight drama came on the final tour: he had run the full distance without pitting, and some spokes on his right rear wheel broke in the banked Karussell. However, such was his lead that he could afford to significantly reduce his pace, nursing the car home to victory.

For his dominant performance, Ascari was presented with the Silbernes Lorbeerblatt (Silver Laurel Leaf), the highest award in German sport. The award had only been established two months prior, and he became its first foreign recipient.

== Entries ==
No	Driver	Entrant	Constructor	Chassis
2	(Italy) Alberto Ascari	Scuderia Ferrari	Ferrari	Ferrari 166 F2
4	(Italy) Dorino Serafini	Scuderia Ferrari	Ferrari	Ferrari 166 F2
8	(Italy) Giovanni Bracco	Giovanni Bracco	Ferrari	
16	(Switzerland) Peter Hirt	Ecurie Suisse	Veritas-BMW	Veritas Meteor
18	(Germany) Paul Glauser	Ecurie Suisse	Veritas-BMW	Veritas Meteor
20	(Switzerland) Kaspar Aebli	Ecurie Suisse	Veritas-BMW	Veritas Meteor
22	(France) "J. M. Marcy"	Ecurie Suisse	Veritas-BMW	Veritas Meteor
24	(Germany) Alfred Dattner	Alfred Dattner	Simca-Gordini	Simca-Gordini T11
26	(Switzerland) Ernst Seiler	Ernst Seiler	Simca-Gordini	Simca-Gordini T15
28	(Switzerland) Claude Bernheim	Claude Bernheim	Cisitalia-Fiat	Cisitalia-Fiat D46
32	(France) Roger Loyer	Ecurie Paris	Simca-Gordini	Simca-Gordini T15
34	(France) "Robert"	Ecurie Paris	Cisitalia-Fiat	Cisitalia-Fiat D46
36	(France) René Bonnet	Automobiles Deutsch-Bonnet	DB-Citroën	
40	(United Kingdom) Fergus Anderson	HW Motors	HWM-Alta	
42	(United Kingdom) Lance Macklin	HW Motors	HWM-Alta	
44	(Germany) Paul Pietsch	Paul Pietsch	Veritas-BMW	Veritas Meteor II
46	(Spain) Paco Godia	Francisco Godia	Cisitalia-Fiat	Cisitalia-Fiat D46
52	(Sweden) Bertil Lundberg	Bertil Lundberg	BLG-BMW	BLG-BMW 2000
54	(United States) Harry Schell	Horschell Racing Corporation	Cooper-JAP	Cooper-JAP T12
56	(Germany) Manfred von Brauchitsch	Manfred von Brauchitsch	AFM-BMW	AFM 6
58	(Germany) Hans Stuck	Hans Stuck	AFM-BMW	
60	(Germany) Fritz Riess	Fritz Riess	AFM-BMW	AFM 3
62	(Germany) Hermann Lang	Hermann Lang	Veritas-BMW	
64	(Germany) Karl Kling	Karl Kling	Veritas-BMW	Veritas Meteor III Streamline
66	(Germany) Toni Ulmen	Toni Ulmen	Veritas-BMW	Veritas RS
68	(Germany) Karl Gommann	Karl Gommann	AFM-BMW	AFM 5
70	(Germany) Willi Heeks	Willi Heeks	AFM-BMW	AFM 2
72	(Germany) Willi Krakau	Willi Krakau	BMW	
76	(Netherlands) Herman Roosdorp	Herman Roosdorp	Ferrari	Ferrari 166 MM
78	(Germany) Paul Greifzu	Paul Greifzu	BMW	
78	(Germany) Carl Bossong	Carl Bossong	Holbein-BMW	Holbein-BMW HH48
82	(Belgium) Georges Berger	Georges Berger	Jicey-BMW	
84	(France) Maurice Trintignant	Equipe Gordini	Simca-Gordini	Simca-Gordini T15
86	(France) Robert Manzon	Equipe Gordini	Simca-Gordini	Simca-Gordini T15
88	(France) André Simon	Equipe Gordini	Simca-Gordini	Simca-Gordini T15
90	(Switzerland) "Eymart"	Equipe Gordini	Simca-Gordini	Simca-Gordini T15
94	(France) Aldo Gordini	Equipe Gordini	Simca-Gordini	Simca-Gordini T15
92	(Switzerland) Toni Branca	Mme de Walckiers	Simca-Gordini	Simca-Gordini T11

== Classification ==
Pos	No	Driver	Constructor	Laps	Time/retired
1	2	(Italy) Alberto Ascari	Ferrari	16	2:55.00.8
2	88	(France) André Simon	Simca-Gordini	16	+2:20.9
3	84	(France) Maurice Trintignant	Simca-Gordini	16	+8:27.7
4	66	(Germany) Toni Ulmen	Veritas-BMW	15	+1 lap
5	26	(Switzerland) Ernst Seiler	Simca-Gordini	15	+1 lap
6	42	(United Kingdom) Lance Macklin	HWM-Alta	15	+1 lap
7	68	(Germany) Karl Gommann	AFM-BMW	14	+2 laps
8	90	(Switzerland) "Eymart"	Simca-Gordini	14	+2 laps
9	82	(Belgium) Georges Berger	Jicey-BMW	13	+3 laps
10	46	(Spain) Paco Godia	Cisitalia-Fiat	11	+5 laps
Ret	86	(France) Robert Manzon	Simca-Gordini	13	Valves
Ret	16	(Switzerland) Peter Hirt	Veritas-BMW	12	
Ret	56	(Germany) Manfred von Brauchitsch	AFM-BMW	11	Engine
Ret	44	(Germany) Paul Pietsch	Veritas-BMW	8	Clutch
Ret	18	(Germany) Paul Glauser	Veritas-BMW	7	
Ret	94	(France) Aldo Gordini	Simca-Gordini	7	
Ret	4	(Italy) Dorino Serafini	Ferrari	6	Gearbox
Ret	40	(United Kingdom) Fergus Anderson	HWM-Alta	5	Differential
Ret	32	(France) Roger Loyer	Simca-Gordini	5	
Ret	34	(France) "Robert"	Cisitalia-Fiat	4	
Ret	64	(Germany) Karl Kling	Veritas-BMW	3	Piston
Ret	28	(Switzerland) Claude Bernheim	Cisitalia-Fiat	3	
Ret	36	(France) René Bonnet	DB-Citroën	3	
Ret	92	(Switzerland) Toni Branca	Simca-Gordini	2	Engine
Ret	62	(Germany) Hermann Lang	Veritas-BMW	2	Engine
Ret	70	(Germany) Willi Heeks	AFM-BMW	2	
Ret	60	(Germany) Fritz Riess	AFM-BMW	2	
Ret	8	(Italy) Giovanni Bracco	Ferrari	2	
Ret	20	(Switzerland) Kaspar Aebli	Veritas-BMW	2	
Ret	76	(Netherlands) Herman Roosdorp	Ferrari	2	
Ret	24	(Germany) Alfred Dattner	Simca-Gordini	1	
Ret	22	(France) "J. M. Marcy"	Veritas-BMW	1	
Ret	52	(Sweden) Bertil Lundberg	BLG-BMW	1	
Ret	72	(Germany) Willi Krakau	BMW	0	
Ret	54	(United States) Harry Schell	Cooper-JAP	0	Engine
DSQ	58	(Germany) Hans Stuck	AFM-BMW	0	Outside assistance
?	78	(Germany) Carl Bossong	Holbein-BMW	0	Unknown
