= Mercedes-Benz S-Series =

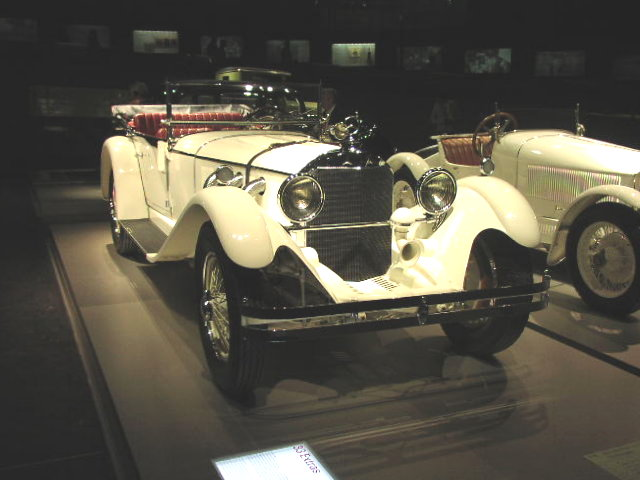

Overview
- Manufacturer: Mercedes-Benz
- Production: 1926–1933
- Assembly: Bremen, Germany
- Designer: Ferdinand Porsche

Body and chassis
- Class: Sports car
- Layout: FMR layout

Powertrain
- Engine: supercharged SOHC I6

The Mercedes-Benz S-Series (W06), nicknamed "the white elephant", was a successful line of sports cars produced from 1926 to 1933.

== Origin ==
In the run-up to the merger between Daimler and Benz & Cie, a race-oriented version of Daimler's Type 630 luxury car was produced with a modified chassis. It was called the Model K (K for Kurzer Radstand, German for 'short wheelbase'). The new Daimler-Benz corporation, which produced cars under the brand name Mercedes-Benz, decided that it would create an even more advanced race car building upon the best features of the Model K, which would be called the Model S (S for Sport).

== Model S ==
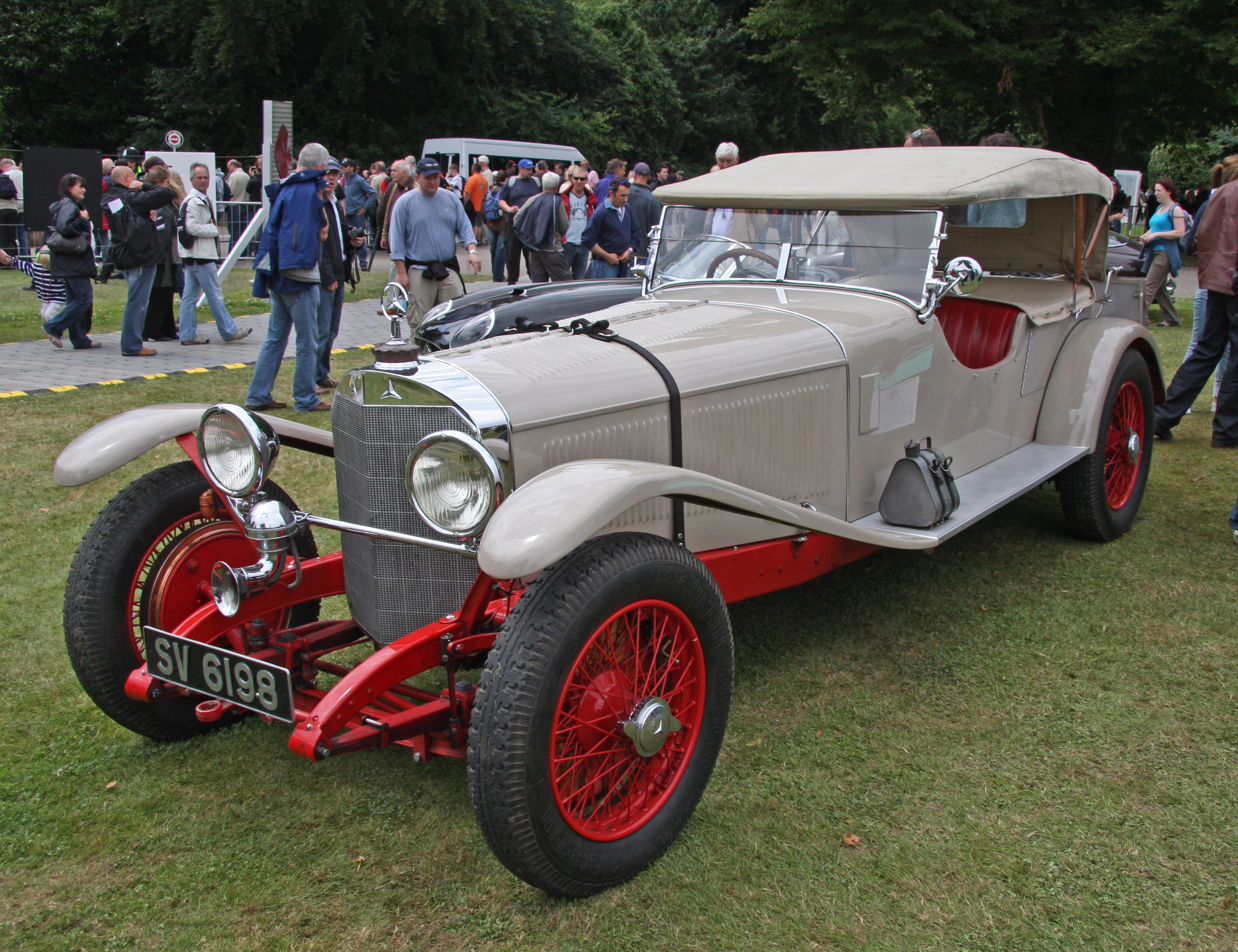
1927 Model S

The six-cylinder engine from the Type 630 was developed into a new motor with the bore widened by 4 millimetres (0.16 in) to increase the engine displacement from 6.3 litres (380 cu in) to 6.7 litres (410 cu in). This engine was given a design code of M06, using the naming convention that became standard after the merger. The letter M for motor designates the engine. W, for Wagen, refers to the vehicle and the S-Series had design code W06. The new M06 engine had an increase of 40 horsepower, producing 180 hp with the supercharger engaged. The dimensions of the Model K chassis were retained, but the frame was lowered significantly and the engine was moved rearward by 30 cm (12 in). The result was that the engine was lower and there was improved weight distribution which improved stability and handling.

== Model SS ==
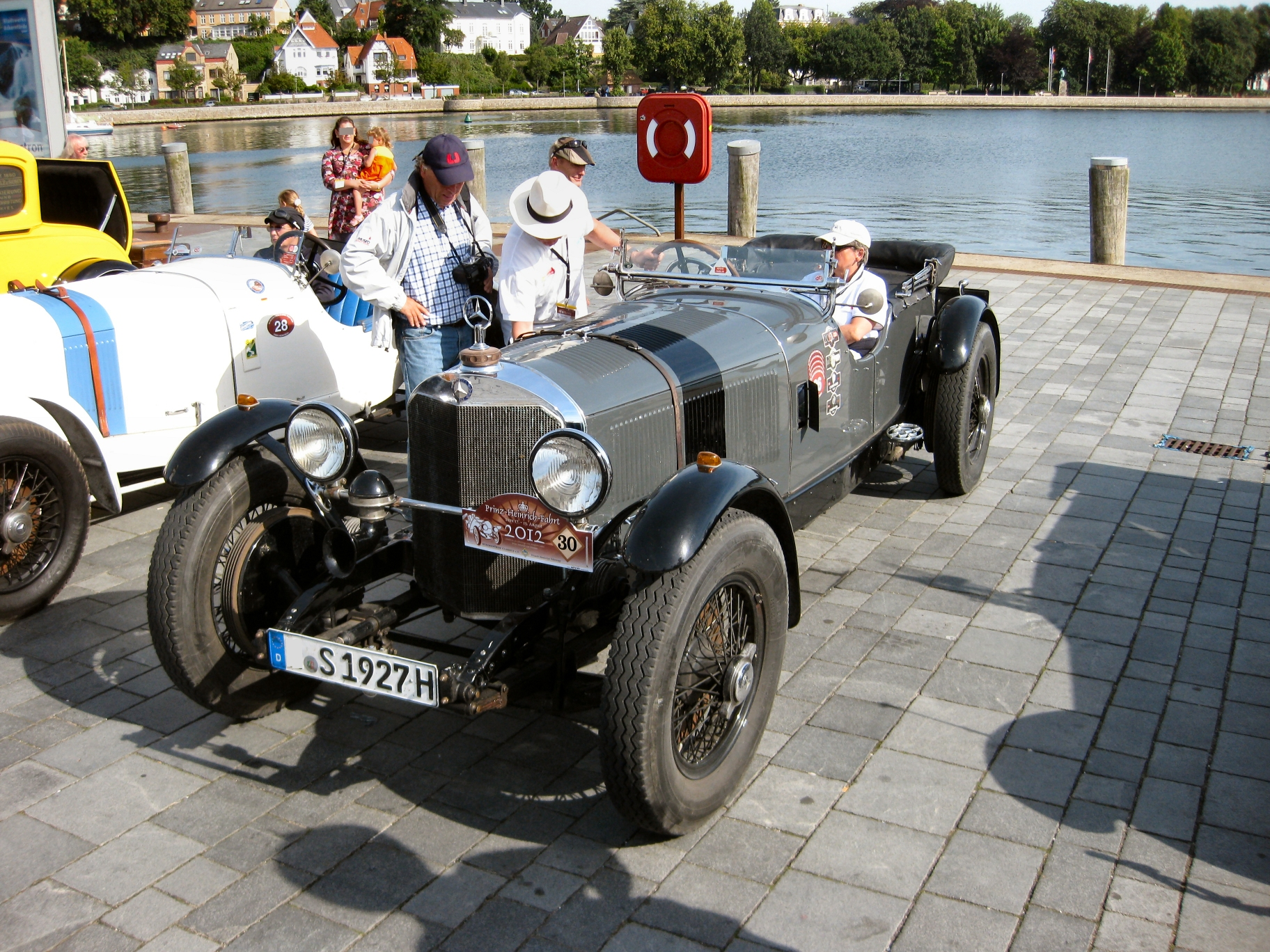
1927 Model SS racer

In mid-1928 a new version of the Model S was produced designated as the SS or Super Sport. The SS was intended as a grand tourer. The use of a wet cylinder liner enabled the M06 to be further bored out, increasing the displacement to 7.1 litres (430 cu in) and providing an additional 40-horsepower, which meant that, with the supercharger engaged, the SS produced 200 hp. With two to three times the power of most cars of its era the SS could achieve a top speed of 118 mph (190 km/h).

== Model SSK ==
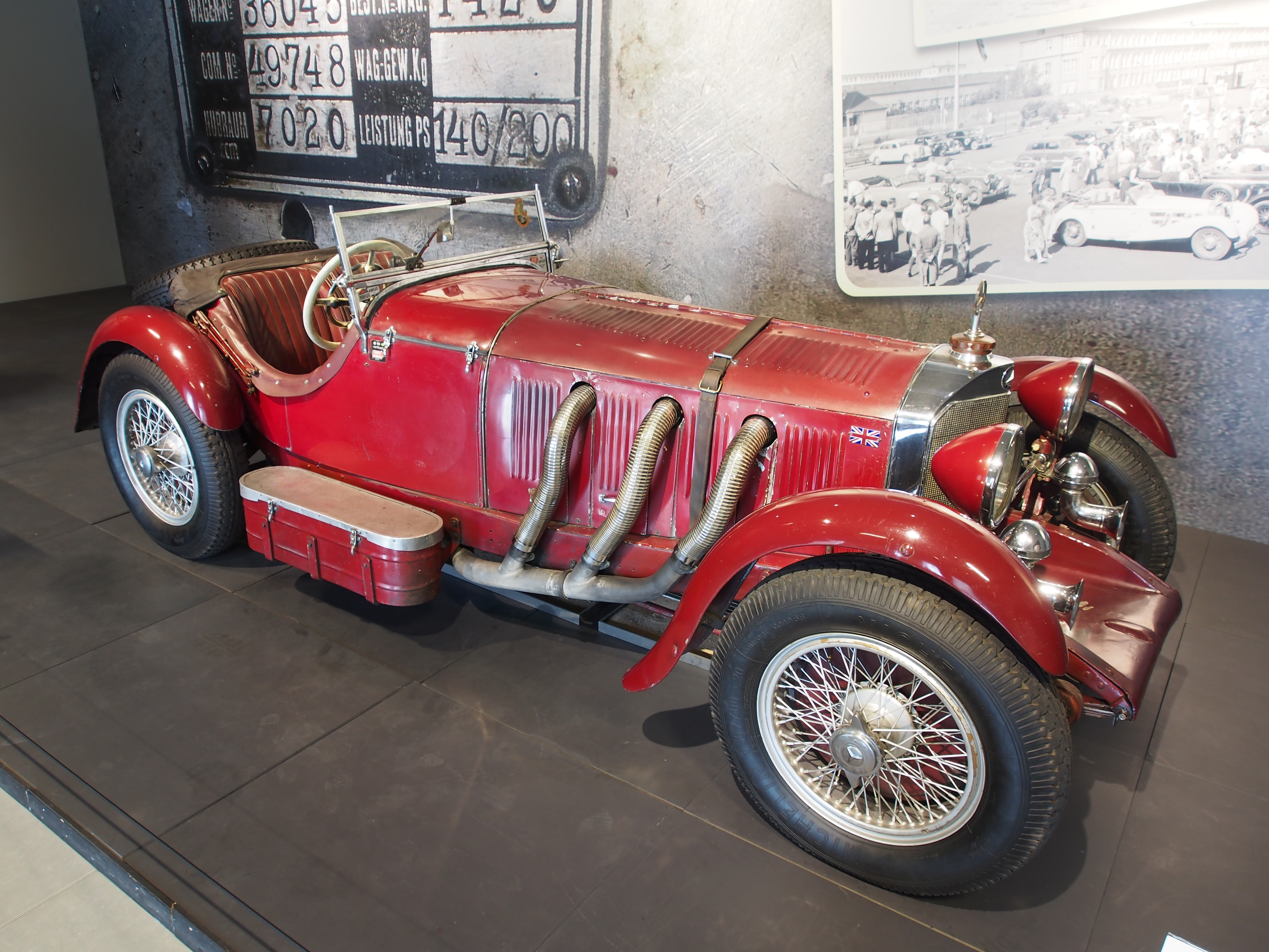
1929 Model SSK

While the S and SS were successful in races for sheer speed, they did not perform as well in terms of turning ability. Hence, in late 1928, a new version of the S-Series was created to compete in hill climbs. This model, called the SSK, which stands for Super Sport Kurz (German for 'Super Sport Short’), had a wheel base shortened to 2,950 millimetres (116 in), and used the improved engine from the SS but kept the lower radiator from the base model S. Its improved handling together with a top speed of 119 mph (192 km/h) made it a fearsome racecar.

== Model SSKL (WS06RS) ==
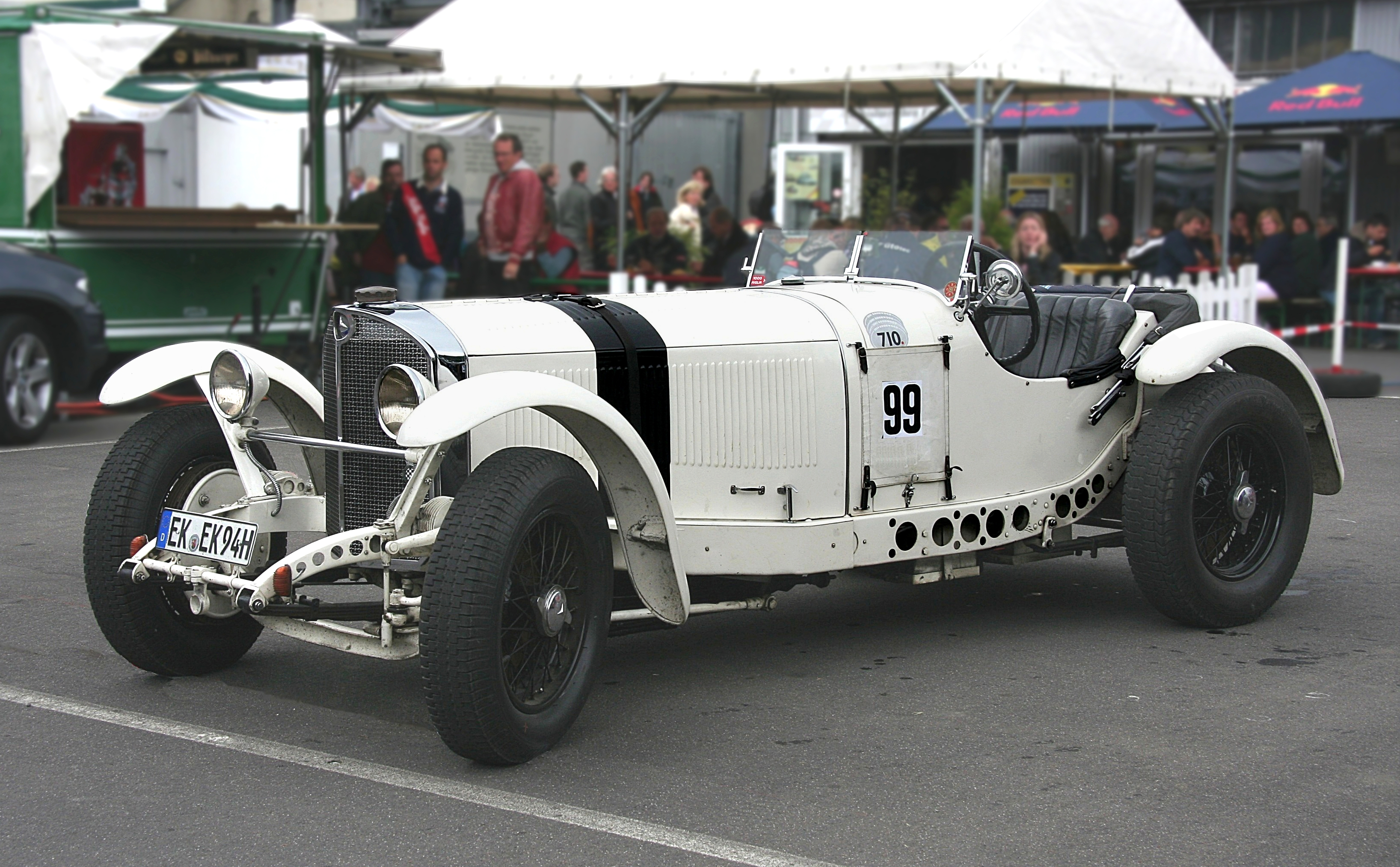
1931 Model SSKL; note the perforations in the frame

The SSK experienced success in competitive racing and was a best seller. In 1931 a pure racing version was produced in a limited run that was not offered through the ordinary sales program but was made available only for competitive racers. This was designated as the SSKL for Super Sport Kurz Leicht (or Super Sport Short Light). The fourth and final model in the S-Series was a lightweight version of the high-performance SSK. Perforations which extended over the entire frame reduced the overall weight by 125 kg (275 lb). With a combination of a power output of 300 hp and an extremely light body, the SSKL achieved a top speed of 146 mph (235 km/h).

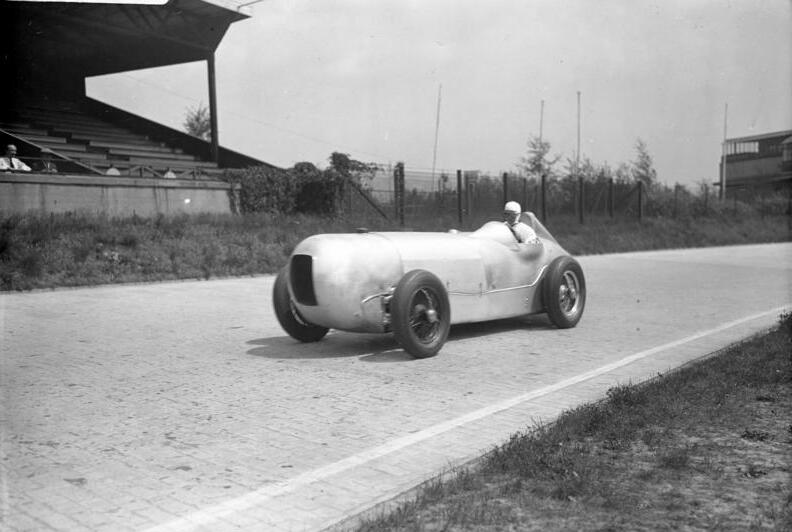
SSKL Streamliner

Of particular interest is the SSKL belonging to Manfred von Brauchitsch, which he had clad in an aerodynamic skin of aluminium sheets. Von Brauchitsch's 'SSKL streamliner' achieved a top speed of 156 mph (251 km/h) and won at the Avus race in May 1932. Broadcasters covering the event on radio referred to the aluminium bodied car as a 'silver arrow.'

== End of the programme ==
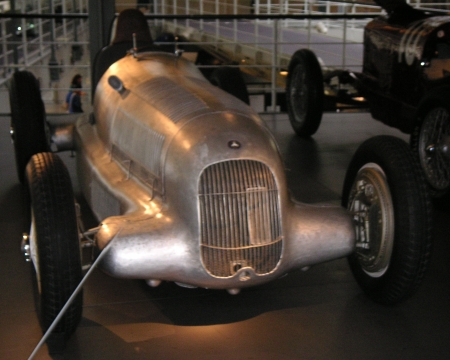
One of the Silver Arrows, the 1934 Model W25

Daimler-Benz enjoyed great success in competition with the S-series, but at the same time these cars, including the SSK, were suitable for everyday driving and helped by the fact that the styling of the cars was considered to be very attractive, they were purchased by wealthy customers who used them that way. However, by 1934 this was not seen as a practical approach going forward. Instead, the different roles would need to fulfilled by distinct lines of cars. The 500K would be marketed as a mass-produced sporty but elegant luxury car, while success in competition would come from a new series of cars that were not at all suitable for ordinary use, but which would become racing legends: the silver arrows.

Fastest street-legal production car
	Preceded by			Succeeded by
	Mercedes 33/180 K	Mercedes-Benz 36/220 S	Mercedes-Benz 38/250 SS	Bugatti Type 57SC
Year:	1926	1927	1928	1936
Top speed:	100 mph (161 km/h)	120 mph (193 km/h)	125 mph (200 km/h)	130 mph (210 km/h)
