= Porsche Grand Prix results =

Formula One results of Porsche cars and engines

These are the complete results achieved by Porsche cars and engines in Formula One, including Formula Two races that were held concurrently.

== World Championship results ==
=== Works team entries ===
(key)

Year	Chassis	Engine(s)	Tyres	Drivers	1	2	3	4	5	6	7	8	9	10	11	Points	WCC
1957	Porsche RS550	547/3 1.5 F4			ARG	MON	500	FRA	GBR	GER	PES	ITA				—N/a^{2}	
1957	Porsche RS550	547/3 1.5 F4		(Germany) Edgar Barth						12^{1}						—N/a^{2}	
1957	Porsche RS550	547/3 1.5 F4		(Italy) Umberto Maglioli						Ret^{1}						—N/a^{2}	
1958	Porsche RSK	547/3 1.5 F4			ARG	MON	NED	500	BEL	FRA	GBR	GER	POR	ITA	MOR	0	NC
1958	Porsche RSK	547/3 1.5 F4		(Germany) Edgar Barth								6^{1}				0	NC
1959	Porsche 718	547/3 1.5 F4	D		MON	500	NED	FRA	GBR	GER	POR	ITA	USA			0	NC
1959	Porsche 718	547/3 1.5 F4	D	(Germany) Wolfgang von Trips	Ret					DNS						0	NC
1959	Behra-Porsche RSK (F2)	547/3 1.5 F4	D	(Italy) Maria Teresa de Filippis	DNQ											0	NC
1960	Porsche 718	547/3 1.5 F4	D		ARG	MON	500	NED	BEL	FRA	GBR	POR	ITA	USA		1	7th
1960	Porsche 718	547/3 1.5 F4	D	(Germany) Hans Herrmann									6			1	7th
1960	Porsche 718	547/3 1.5 F4	D	(Germany) Edgar Barth									7			1	7th
1961	Porsche 718; Porsche 787	547/3 1.5 F4	D		MON	NED	BEL	FRA	GBR	GER	ITA	USA				22 (23)	3rd
1961	Porsche 718; Porsche 787	547/3 1.5 F4	D	(Sweden) Jo Bonnier	12	11	7	7	5	Ret	Ret	6				22 (23)	3rd
1961	Porsche 718; Porsche 787	547/3 1.5 F4	D	(United States) Dan Gurney	5	10	6	2	7	7	2	2				22 (23)	3rd
1961	Porsche 718; Porsche 787	547/3 1.5 F4	D	(Germany) Hans Herrmann	9					13						22 (23)	3rd
1961	Porsche 718; Porsche 787	547/3 1.5 F4	D	(Germany) Edgar Barth						WD						22 (23)	3rd
1962	Porsche 804; Porsche 718	753 1.5 F8; 547/3 1.5 F4	D		NED	MON	BEL	FRA	GBR	GER	ITA	USA	RSA			18 (19)	5th
1962	Porsche 804; Porsche 718	753 1.5 F8; 547/3 1.5 F4	D	(Sweden) Jo Bonnier	7	5	WD	10	Ret	7	6	13				18 (19)	5th
1962	Porsche 804; Porsche 718	753 1.5 F8; 547/3 1.5 F4	D	(United States) Dan Gurney	Ret	Ret		1	9	3^{P}	13	5				18 (19)	5th
1962	Porsche 804; Porsche 718	753 1.5 F8; 547/3 1.5 F4	D	(United States) Phil Hill								DNS				18 (19)	5th

=== Results of other Porsche cars ===
(key)

Year	Entrant/s	Chassis	Engine	Tyres	Driver/s	1	2	3	4	5	6	7	8	9	10	11
1957						ARG	MON	500	FRA	GBR	GER	PES	ITA			
1957	Ecurie Maarsbergen	Porsche RS550	547/3 1.5 F4	D	(Netherlands) Carel Godin de Beaufort						14^{1}					
1958						ARG	MON	NED	500	BEL	FRA	GBR	GER	POR	ITA	MOR
1958	Ecurie Maarsbergen	Porsche RSK	547/3 1.5 F4	D	(Netherlands) Carel Godin de Beaufort			11								
1958	Ecurie Maarsbergen	Porsche RS550	547/3 1.5 F4	D	(Netherlands) Carel Godin de Beaufort								Ret^{1}			
1959						MON	500	NED	FRA	GBR	GER	POR	ITA	USA		
1959	Ecurie Maarsbergen	Porsche RSK	547/3 1.5 F4	D	(Netherlands) Carel Godin de Beaufort			10								
1959	Blanchard Automobile Co.	Porsche RSK	547/3 1.5 F4	D	(United States) Harry Blanchard									7		
1961						MON	NED	BEL	FRA	GBR	GER	ITA	USA			
1961	Ecurie Maarsbergen	Porsche 718	547/3 1.5 F4	D	(Netherlands) Carel Godin de Beaufort		14	11	Ret	16	14	7				
1961	Ecurie Maarsbergen	Porsche 718	547/3 1.5 F4	D	(Germany) Hans Herrmann		15									
1962						NED	MON	BEL	FRA	GBR	GER	ITA	USA	RSA		
1962	Ecurie Maarsbergen	Porsche 718	547/3 1.5 F4	D	(Netherlands) Carel Godin de Beaufort	6	DNQ	7	6	14	13	10	Ret	11		
1962	Ecurie Maarsbergen	Porsche 787	547/3 1.5 F4	D	(Netherlands) Ben Pon	Ret										
1962	Ecurie Maarsbergen	Porsche 718	547/3 1.5 F4	D	(Netherlands) Rob Slotemaker	WD										
1962	Scuderia SSS Republica di Venezia	Porsche 718	547/3 1.5 F4	D	(Italy) Nino Vaccarella						15					
1962	Ecurie Filipinetti	Porsche 718	547/3 1.5 F4	D	(Switzerland) Heini Walter						14					
1963						MON	BEL	NED	FRA	GBR	GER	ITA	USA	MEX	RSA	
1963	Ecurie Maarsbergen	Porsche 718	547/3 1.5 F4	D	(Netherlands) Carel Godin de Beaufort		6	9		10	Ret	DNQ	6	10	10	
1963	Ecurie Maarsbergen	Porsche 718	547/3 1.5 F4	D	(Germany) Gerhard Mitter			Ret			4	WD				
1963	Comte G. Volpi	Porsche 718	547/3 1.5 F4	D	(Italy) Carlo Mario Abate							WD				
1964						MON	NED	BEL	FRA	GBR	GER	AUT	ITA	USA	MEX	
1964	Ecurie Maarsbergen	Porsche 718	547/3 1.5 F4	D	(Netherlands) Carel Godin de Beaufort		Ret				DNS					

Notes

- ^1 – Indicates a race entered with an F2 car.
- ^2 – The Constructors World Championship did not exist before 1958.

=== As an engine supplier ===
(key)

Year	Entrant	Chassis	Engine	Tyres	Drivers	1	2	3	4	5	6	7	8	9	10	11	12	13	14	15	16	Points	WCC
1959	Dr Ing F. Porsche KG	Behra-Porsche RSK	547/3 1.5 F4	D		MON	500	NED	FRA	GBR	GER	POR	ITA	USA								0	NC
1959	Dr Ing F. Porsche KG	Behra-Porsche RSK	547/3 1.5 F4	D	(Italy) Maria Teresa de Filippis	DNQ																0	NC
1959	Jean Behra	Behra-Porsche RSK	547/3 1.5 F4	D	(France) Jean Behra						DNS											0	NC
1960	Camoradi International	Behra-Porsche RSK	547/3 1.5 F4	D		ARG	MON	500	NED	BEL	FRA	GBR	POR	ITA	USA							0	NC
1960	Camoradi International	Behra-Porsche RSK	547/3 1.5 F4	D	(United States) Masten Gregory	12																0	NC
1960	Camoradi International	Behra-Porsche RSK	547/3 1.5 F4	D	(United States) Fred Gamble									10								0	NC
1983	Marlboro McLaren International	McLaren MP4/1E	TAG (Porsche) TTE PO1 1.5 V6 t	M		BRA	USW	FRA	SMR	MON	BEL	DET	CAN	GBR	GER	AUT	NED	ITA	EUR	RSA		0	NC
1983	Marlboro McLaren International	McLaren MP4/1E	TAG (Porsche) TTE PO1 1.5 V6 t	M	(Austria) Niki Lauda												Ret	Ret	Ret	11^{†}		0	NC
1983	Marlboro McLaren International	McLaren MP4/1E	TAG (Porsche) TTE PO1 1.5 V6 t	M	(United Kingdom) John Watson													Ret	Ret	DSQ		0	NC
1984	Marlboro McLaren International	McLaren MP4/2	TAG (Porsche) TTE PO1 1.5 V6 t	M		BRA	RSA	BEL	SMR	FRA	MON	CAN	DET	DAL	GBR	GER	AUT	NED	ITA	EUR	POR	143.5	1st
1984	Marlboro McLaren International	McLaren MP4/2	TAG (Porsche) TTE PO1 1.5 V6 t	M	(Austria) Niki Lauda	Ret	1	Ret	Ret	1	Ret	2	Ret	Ret	1	2	1	2	1	4	2	143.5	1st
1984	Marlboro McLaren International	McLaren MP4/2	TAG (Porsche) TTE PO1 1.5 V6 t	M	(France) Alain Prost	1	2	Ret	1	7	1^{‡}	3	4	Ret	Ret	1	Ret	1	Ret	1	1	143.5	1st
1985	Marlboro McLaren International	McLaren MP4/2B	TAG (Porsche) TTE PO1 1.5 V6 t	G		BRA	POR	SMR	MON	CAN	DET	FRA	GBR	GER	AUT	NED	ITA	BEL	EUR	RSA	AUS	90	1st
1985	Marlboro McLaren International	McLaren MP4/2B	TAG (Porsche) TTE PO1 1.5 V6 t	G	(Austria) Niki Lauda	Ret	Ret	4	Ret	Ret	Ret	Ret	Ret	5	Ret	1	Ret	DNS		Ret	Ret	90	1st
1985	Marlboro McLaren International	McLaren MP4/2B	TAG (Porsche) TTE PO1 1.5 V6 t	G	(United Kingdom) John Watson														7			90	1st
1985	Marlboro McLaren International	McLaren MP4/2B	TAG (Porsche) TTE PO1 1.5 V6 t	G	(France) Alain Prost	1	Ret	DSQ	1	3	Ret	3	1	2	1	2	1	3	4	3	Ret	90	1st
1986	Marlboro McLaren International	McLaren MP4/2C	TAG (Porsche) TTE PO1 1.5 V6 t	G		BRA	ESP	SMR	MON	BEL	CAN	DET	FRA	GBR	GER	HUN	AUT	ITA	POR	MEX	AUS	96	2nd
1986	Marlboro McLaren International	McLaren MP4/2C	TAG (Porsche) TTE PO1 1.5 V6 t	G	(France) Alain Prost	Ret	3	1	1	6	2	3	2	3	6^{†}	Ret	1	DSQ	2	2	1	96	2nd
1986	Marlboro McLaren International	McLaren MP4/2C	TAG (Porsche) TTE PO1 1.5 V6 t	G	(Finland) Keke Rosberg	Ret	4	5^{†}	2	Ret	4	Ret	4	Ret	5^{†}	Ret	9^{†}	4	Ret	Ret	Ret	96	2nd
1987	Marlboro McLaren International	McLaren MP4/3	TAG (Porsche) TTE PO1 1.5 V6 t	G		BRA	SMR	BEL	MON	DET	FRA	GBR	GER	HUN	AUT	ITA	POR	ESP	MEX	JPN	AUS	76	2nd
1987	Marlboro McLaren International	McLaren MP4/3	TAG (Porsche) TTE PO1 1.5 V6 t	G	(France) Alain Prost	1	Ret	1	9^{†}	3	3	Ret	7^{†}	3	6	15	1	2	Ret	7	Ret	76	2nd
1987	Marlboro McLaren International	McLaren MP4/3	TAG (Porsche) TTE PO1 1.5 V6 t	G	(Sweden) Stefan Johansson	3	4	2	Ret	7	8	Ret	2	Ret	7	6	5	3	Ret	3	Ret	76	2nd
1991	Footwork Grand Prix International	Footwork A11C; Footwork FA12	3512 3.5 V12	G		USA	BRA	SMR	MON	CAN	MEX	FRA	GBR	GER	HUN	BEL	ITA	POR	ESP	JPN	AUS	0	NC
1991	Footwork Grand Prix International	Footwork A11C; Footwork FA12	3512 3.5 V12	G	(Italy) Alex Caffi	DNQ	DNQ	DNQ	DNQ													0	NC
1991	Footwork Grand Prix International	Footwork A11C; Footwork FA12	3512 3.5 V12	G	(Sweden) Stefan Johansson					Ret	DNQ											0	NC
1991	Footwork Grand Prix International	Footwork A11C; Footwork FA12	3512 3.5 V12	G	(Italy) Michele Alboreto	Ret	DNQ	DNQ	Ret	Ret	Ret											0	NC

== Non-championship Formula One results ==
(key)

Year	Entrant	Chassis	Engine	Driver	1	2	3	4	5	6	7	8	9	10	11	12	13	14	15	16	17	18	19	20	21
1955	Scuderia Lupini	Cooper Mk VI	Porsche Type 506 1.5 F4		PCM																				
1955	Scuderia Lupini	Cooper Mk VI	Porsche Type 506 1.5 F4	(South Africa) Ian Fraser-Jones	Ret																				
1956	Scuderia Lupini	Cooper Mk VI	Porsche Type 506 1.5 F4		FBY	RHS																			
1956	Scuderia Lupini	Cooper Mk VI	Porsche Type 506 1.5 F4	(South Africa) Ian Fraser-Jones		1																			
1956	Scuderia Lupini	Cooper Mk VI	Porsche Type 506 1.5 F4	(United Kingdom) Horse Boyden	13																				
1957	Scuderia Lupini	Cooper Mk VI	Porsche Type 506 1.5 F4		HEH	COR	GCU																		
1957	Scuderia Lupini	Cooper Mk VI	Porsche Type 506 1.5 F4	(South Africa) Ian Fraser-Jones		3	Ret																		
1957	Scuderia Lupini	Cooper Mk VI	Porsche Type 506 1.5 F4	(United Kingdom) Horse Boyden	1																				
1957	Umberto Maglioli	Porsche RSK	547/3 1.5 F4		BUE	SYR	PAU	GLV	NAP	RMS	CAE	INT	MOD	MOR											
1957	Umberto Maglioli	Porsche RSK	547/3 1.5 F4	(Italy) Umberto Maglioli					NC																
1958	Scuderia Lupini	Cooper Mk VI	Porsche Type 589S 1.5 F4		HEH	COR	GCS	GCU																	
1958	Scuderia Lupini	Cooper Mk VI	Porsche Type 589S 1.5 F4	(South Africa) Ian Fraser-Jones	2	1	4																		
1958	Scuderia Lupini	Cooper Mk VI	Porsche Type 589S 1.5 F4	(South Africa) Vic Procter				3																	
1959	Scuderia Lupini	Cooper Mk VI	Porsche Type 528/2 S 1.5 F4		GCU	GCW																			
1959	Scuderia Lupini	Cooper Mk VI	Porsche Type 528/2 S 1.5 F4	(United Kingdom) Horse Boyden	2	6																			
1960	Scuderia Lupini	Cooper Mk VI	Porsche Type 528/2 S 1.5 F4		RSA																				
1960	Scuderia Lupini	Cooper Mk VI	Porsche Type 528/2 S 1.5 F4	(United Kingdom) Horse Boyden	Ret																				
1960	Rob Walker Racing/Porsche	Porsche 718	547/3 1.5 F4		CAP	RSA																			
1960	Rob Walker Racing/Porsche	Porsche 718	547/3 1.5 F4	(United Kingdom) Stirling Moss	1	1																			
1960	Rob Walker Racing/Porsche	Porsche 718	547/3 1.5 F4	(Sweden) Joakim Bonnier	2^{F}	2^{F}																			
1961	Porsche System Engineering	Porsche 718	Porsche 547/3 1.5 F4		LOM	GLV	PAU	BRX	VIE	AIN	SYR	NAP	LON	SIL	SOL	KAN	DAN	MOD	FLG	OUL	LEW	VAL	RAN	NAT	RSA
1961	Porsche System Engineering	Porsche 718	Porsche 547/3 1.5 F4	(Sweden) Joakim Bonnier				Ret^{P}			3				3^{P}	2		2	3	WD			3^{F}	3	3
1961	Porsche System Engineering	Porsche 718	Porsche 547/3 1.5 F4	(United States) Dan Gurney				Ret			2^{P}^{F}				2^{F}			3		WD					
1961	Porsche System Engineering	Porsche 718	Porsche 547/3 1.5 F4	(Germany) Hans Herrmann											6										
1961	Porsche System Engineering	Porsche 718	Porsche 547/3 1.5 F4	(Germany) Edgar Barth											8								4	4	5
1961	Ecurie Maarsbergen	Porsche 718	Porsche 547/3 1.5 F4	(Netherlands) Carel Godin de Beaufort											Ret		Ret	DNQ	6						
1961	Ecurie Maarsbergen	Porsche 718	Porsche 547/3 1.5 F4	(Sweden) Ulf Norinder												Ret									
1961	Scuderia Sant Ambroeus	Porsche 718	Porsche 547/3 1.5 F4	(Italy) Giancarlo Baghetti																		1			
1962	Porsche System Engineering	Porsche 804; Porsche 718	753 1.5 F8; 547/3 1.5 F4		CAP	BRX	LOM	LAV	GLV	PAU	AIN	INT	NAP	MAL	CLP	RMS	SOL	KAN	MED	DAN	OUL	MEX	RAN	NAT	
1962	Porsche System Engineering	Porsche 804; Porsche 718	753 1.5 F8; 547/3 1.5 F4	(Sweden) Joakim Bonnier	3												2	3				DNA			
1962	Porsche System Engineering	Porsche 804; Porsche 718	753 1.5 F8; 547/3 1.5 F4	(Germany) Edgar Barth	6																				
1962	Porsche System Engineering	Porsche 804; Porsche 718	753 1.5 F8; 547/3 1.5 F4	(Canada) Ludwig Heimrath						Ret															
1962	Porsche System Engineering	Porsche 804; Porsche 718	753 1.5 F8; 547/3 1.5 F4	(United States) Dan Gurney													1^{F}					DNA			
1962	Autosport Team Wolfgang Seidel	Porsche 804; Porsche 718	753 1.5 F8; 547/3 1.5 F4	(Germany) Wolfgang Seidel		9	6	7	11		Ret														
1962	Ecurie Nationale Suisse	Porsche 804; Porsche 718	753 1.5 F8; 547/3 1.5 F4	(Switzerland) Heinz Schiller		8				9															
1962	Ecurie Filipinetti	Porsche 804; Porsche 718	753 1.5 F8; 547/3 1.5 F4	(Switzerland) Heinz Schiller									DNQ				7		Ret						
1962	Scuderia SSS Republica di Venezia	Porsche 804; Porsche 718	753 1.5 F8; 547/3 1.5 F4	(Sweden) Joakim Bonnier		2	3			Ret		12		6		8									
1962	Scuderia SSS Republica di Venezia	Porsche 804; Porsche 718	753 1.5 F8; 547/3 1.5 F4	(Italy) Carlo Maria Abate									4				DNA		3						
1962	Scuderia SSS Republica di Venezia	Porsche 804; Porsche 718	753 1.5 F8; 547/3 1.5 F4	(Italy) Nino Vaccarella													DNA								
1962	Ecurie Maarsbergen	Porsche 804; Porsche 718	753 1.5 F8; 547/3 1.5 F4	(Netherlands) Carel Godin de Beaufort										9		7	5	6		7	7	7			
1963	Ecurie Maarsbergen	Porsche 718	547/3 1.5 F4		LOM	GLV	PAU	IMO	SYR	AIN	INT	ROM	SOL	KAN	MED	AUT	OUL	RAN							
1963	Ecurie Maarsbergen	Porsche 718	547/3 1.5 F4	(Netherlands) Carel Godin de Beaufort			4	6	2		9	2^{P}	7	7	DNS	3	10								
1963	Ecurie Maarsbergen	Porsche 718	547/3 1.5 F4	(United Kingdom) Jack Fairman				7																	
1963	Ecurie Maarsbergen	Porsche 718	547/3 1.5 F4	(Germany) Gerhard Mitter									5												
1963	Scuderia Centro Sud	Porsche 718	547/3 1.5 F4	(Italy) Carlo Maria Abate				WD																	
1963	Count Volpi	Porsche 718	547/3 1.5 F4	(Italy) Carlo Maria Abate											8										
1963	Count Volpi	Porsche 718	547/3 1.5 F4	(Argentina) Juan Manuel Bordeu								Ret													
1963	Scuderia Filipinetti	Porsche 718	547/3 1.5 F4	(Switzerland) Heinz Schiller			3																		
1964	Ecurie Maarsbergen	Porsche 718	547/3 1.5 F4		DMT	NWT	SYR	AIN	INT	SOL	MED	RAN													
1964	Ecurie Maarsbergen	Porsche 718	547/3 1.5 F4	(Netherlands) Carel Godin de Beaufort					13	8															
