= Casner Motor Racing Division =

American sports car racing team

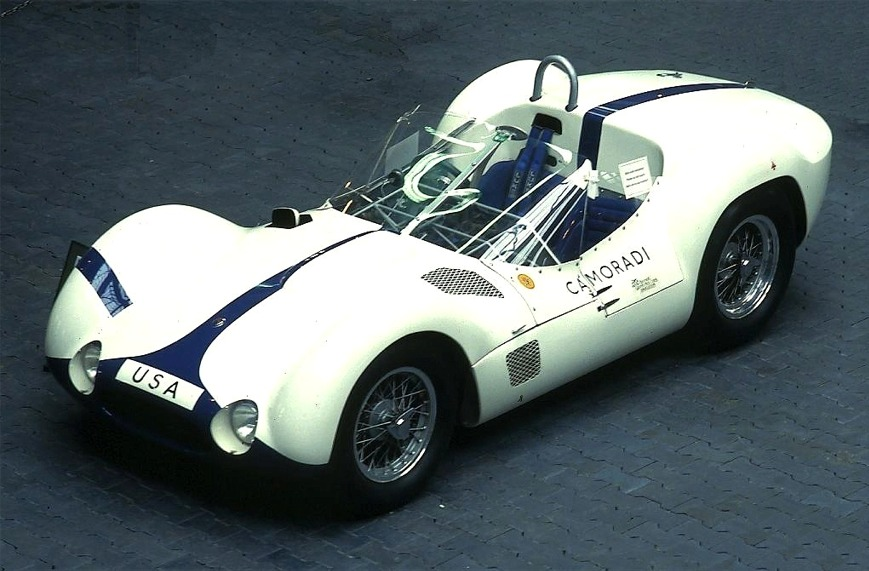
A Camoradi Birdcage

Casner Motor Racing Division – also known as America Camoradi (casner motor racing division), Camoradi USA or Camoradi International – was an American racing team of the 1960s known for racing Maserati Birdcage sports cars, and a Porsche and Cooper in Formula One.

== History ==
The team was founded by Lloyd "Lucky" Casner in 1960, after he gained interest in the Maserati Tipo 61 in August 1959, and was created to race in the 24 Hours of Le Mans. The Camoradi team won the 1000km Nürburgring in 1960 despite a broken fuel line halfway through the race. The team achieved victory again in 1961, however, due to the unreliability of their cars they never won Le Mans. Camoradi also purchased a single Tipo 63 (a more powerful and faster car) but it also suffered the reliability problems of the Tipo 61s.

Camoradi USA was incorporated in the summer of 1959 and ended due to mismanagement and loss of sponsorship 18 months later. Casner stayed on in Europe and re-incorporated his efforts as Camoradi International (1961). Camoradi International continued with sponsorship from Dow Chemical, Maserati and Porsche, and with drivers Stirling Moss, Graham Hill and Masten Gregory. Casner was killed at a LeMans practice in 1965 while trying to qualify a Maserati Tipo 151 for the French distributor, due to a mechanical failure.

Camoradi USA was America's first industry-backed international racing team.

At a midsummer 1959 SCCA race in Miami, while racing a Ferrari 250TR, Casner met fellow driver Fred Gamble. During the victory presentation at the end of the race, Casner announced his intention of racing in Europe and was looking for people to help him fund this venture. Gamble introduced himself to Casner and offered to help him with publicity, working as a motor journalist and the two formed a partnership to create a racing team.

Gamble, inspired by Ecurie Ecosse, the Scottish National Racing Team that spawned Jim Clark and Jackie Stewart, suggested an American “Olympic Team” of motor racing to challenge the Europeans for World Championships.

Casner's amateur racing team of friends had called themselves Camoradi Racing Team. So the professional team was incorporated as Camoradi USA, America's first industry-sponsored racing team with drivers from all race series in cars that could be acquired.

Gamble, who had a public relations background, surveyed the New York adverting agency market, to determine their involvement with the auto industry. He set up appointments for Casner with various advertising agencies looking for sponsorship for the new racing team. They met with success with the agency of Young & Rubicam, whose major client was the Goodyear Tire & Rubber Company. Gamble, who knew Tony Webner, Goodyear's first Manager of Racing, convinced him to support their proposal. Casner and executives from Young and Rubicam made a presentation to the management of Goodyear and won big financial support, tires and engineering support. With the world's largest tire company supporting them, Camoradi quickly received sponsorship Shell/BP, Excide, Champion, DA Lubricants, Koni, Dow Chemical and Guest Airways.

The only American sports car of that era was, of course, the Corvette, which was needed as the GT challenger in their campaign for the World Sports Car Championship. Casner met with Chevrolet President Ed Cole and Corvette "god-father" Zora Duntov. They enthusiastically offered their support with two competition option Corvettes plus parts and technical support and a generous financial contribution. However, with an agreed industry ban on racing involvement, this support was disguised as a "testing contract" and the cars were supplied thru Don Allen Chevrolet of Miami. Sadly, due to production delays, the Corvettes were not delivered until after the first 1960 World Championship 1000 km race, Buenos Aires.

Casner went to Europe in September 1959 and approached a bankrupt Maserati who had their new Birdcage T61, but no finances to race a factory team. Camoradi was their answer for 1960. Casner also formed an alliance with Porsche's Huschke Von Hanstein and brought two cars from the late Jean Behra's estate – lightweight Carrera and the special Behra-Porsche F2, which served as a test bed and prototype for the Porsche's 1960 F2 cars and 1962 F1 1,500cc Formula.

Camoradi “works” Maseratis, led every World Sports Car Championship race of 1960, and won only the 1,000 km Nurburging with Gurney/Moss. Led Nassau 1959 (Shelby DNF, Mechanical), Porsche RSK 2 Liter winner (Bonnier), GT winner Porsche Carrera (Cuevas); 1960 1,000 km Buenos Aires (Gurney/Gregory DNF Mechanical and accident); Argentine GP (Gregory Behra-Porsche); Havana GP for Sports Cars – 8 car entry, winning overall Moss Maserati, 2 Liter Gregory Porsche RSK, GT Corvette Jeffords, under 2 liter GT Cuevas Porsche Carrera; Sebring 12 hour, largest team entry ever of 8 cars, 3 Maseratis (Gurney/Moss led 8 hours DNF Mechanical), 2 Porsche Carreras (under 2 liter GT winner and 2nd OA GT Sheppard/Dungan), 2 Corvettes Jeffords/Weustoff/Gamble (Gamble drove 12 hours solo – only one of two known to have done this – earned press notice as “iron man” Gamble). OSCA 750 (McCluggage/Windridge DNF).

At the Nurburgring, Gamble qualified the “Yank Tank” Corvette 3rd among the big GT's (several 250 GT Ferraris), but didn't get to drive in the race as co-driver Lee Lilley started the race and DNF with a wheel bearing failure. Gurney/Moss won overall, Gregory/Munaron 4th in the team's two T61 Maseratis entered.

At the Le Mans 24 hours, Gregory/Daigh led with the famed Streamliner Birdcage Maserati, set a 3-liter lap record and top speed record of 170 mph, DNF with engine failure, other two long tail Maseratis DNF with electrical faults. Gamble/Lilley drove their Corvette conservatively to finish 10th overall.

All Camoradi Maseratis were prepared and maintained by the factory and in European races managed by Maserati. Camoradi's role was primarily financial. Gamble was the only full-time principal in Europe, living in Modena, Italy.

== Complete Camoradi racing record ==
(key) (Results in bold indicate pole position; results in italics indicate fastest lap; † indicates shared drive.)

Date	Race	Car	Results	Drivers
1959 - May	San Salvador GP	Porsche RSK 547/3 1.5 F4	1st	
1959 - May	San Salvador GP	Porsche RSK 547/3 1.5 F4	1st	(United States) David Lane
1959 - June	USAC Formula Libre, Lime Rock	Maserati 250F1 2.5 L6	1st	(United States) Chuck Daigh
1959 - June	USAC Formula Libre, Lime Rock	Maserati 250F1 2.5 L6	2nd	(United States) Chuck Daigh
1959 - July	USAC Formula Libre, Meadowdale	Maserati 250F1 2.5 L6	DNF (Accident)	(United States) Chuck Daigh
1959 - July	USAC Formula Libre, Meadowdale	Maserati 250F1 2.5 L6	DNF (Accident)	(United States) Zora Duntov, (United States) Paul O'Shea
1959 - December	Nassau Speed Weeks	Maserati T61	DNF (Accident)	(United States) Carroll Shelby
1959 - December	Nassau Speed Weeks	Maserati T61	DNF (Mechanical)	(United States) Carroll Shelby
1959 - December	Nassau Speed Weeks	Porsche RSK 547/3 1.5 F4	1st (2 litre)	(United States) Carroll Shelby
1959 - December	Nassau Speed Weeks	Porsche RSK 547/3 1.5 F4	1st (2 litre)	(Sweden) Jo Bonnier
1959 - December	Nassau Speed Weeks	Porsche RSK 547/3 1.5 F4	1st (2 litre)	(United States) Jack McAfee
1959 - December	Nassau Speed Weeks	Porsche RSK 547/3 1.5 F4	2nd (2 litre)	(United States) Jack McAfee
1959 - December	Nassau Speed Weeks	Porsche Carrera	1st (GT Race)	(United States) Jack McAfee
1959 - December	Nassau Speed Weeks	Porsche Carrera	1st (GT Race)	(Cuba) Johnny Cuevas
1959 - December	United States GP, Sebring	Maserati TecMec	1st (GT Race)	(United States) Jim Rathmann
1959 - December	United States GP, Sebring	Maserati TecMec	DNF (Mechanical)	(United States) Jim Rathmann
1960 - January	1,000 km of Argentina, Buenos Aires	Maserati T61	DNF(Accident)	(United States) Jim Rathmann
1960 - January	1,000 km of Argentina, Buenos Aires	Maserati T61	DNF(Accident)	(United States) Dan Gurney, (United States) Masten Gregory
1960 - January	GP of Argentina	Porsche F2	DNF(Accident)	(United States) Masten Gregory
1960 - January	GP of Argentina	Porsche F2	12th	(United States) Masten Gregory
1960 - January	Cordova Formula Libre	Behra-Porsche F2	DNF(Accident)	(United States) Masten Gregory
1960 - January	Cordova Formula Libre	Behra-Porsche F2	DNF(Accident)	(United States) Masten Gregory
1960 - February	Havana GT Race	Corvette	DNF(Accident)	(United States) Jim Jeffords
1960 - February	Havana GT Race	Corvette	1st	(United States) Jim Jeffords
1960 - February	Havana GT Race	Corvette	5th	(United States) Jim Jeffords
1960 - February	Havana GT Race	Corvette	5th	(United States) George Constantine
1960 - February	Havana GT Race	Porsche Carrera	5th	(Cuba) Johnny Cuevas
1960 - February	Havana GT Race	Porsche Carrera	1st(2 litre)	(Cuba) Johnny Cuevas
1960 - February	Havana Grand Prix	Maserati T61	1st	(Cuba) Johnny Cuevas
1960 - February	Havana Grand Prix	Maserati T61	1st	(United Kingdom) Stirling Moss
1960 - February	Havana Grand Prix	Porsche RSK 547/3 1.5 F4	1st	(United States) Masten Gregory
1960 - February	Havana Grand Prix	Porsche RSK 547/3 1.5 F4	3rd	(United States) Masten Gregory
1960 - February	Havana Grand Prix	Corvette	1st GT (8th overall)	(United States) Masten Gregory
1960 - February	Havana Grand Prix	Corvette	1st GT (8th overall)	(United States) Jim Jeffords
1960 - February	Havana Grand Prix	Porsche Carrera	1st GT (8th overall)	(Cuba) Johnny Cuevas
1960 - February	Havana Grand Prix	Porsche Carrera	1st (2 litre)	(Cuba) Johnny Cuevas
1960 - February	Havana Grand Prix	Ferrari 250TR	13th	(Cuba) Johnny Cuevas
1960 - February	Havana Grand Prix	Ferrari 250TR	13th	(United States) Rodger Ward, (United States) Dan Gurney
1960 - February	Havana Grand Prix	Maserati	13th	(United States) Dan Gurney
1960 - February	Havana Grand Prix	Maserati	DNF	(United States) Dan Gurney
1960 - February	Havana Grand Prix	Porsche	DNF	(United States) Dan Gurney
1960 - February	Havana Grand Prix	Porsche	DNF	(United States) Carroll Shelby
1960 - March	12 Hours of Sebring	Maserati T61	DNF	(United States) Dan Gurney, (United Kingdom) Stirling Moss
1960 - March	12 Hours of Sebring	Maserati T61	DNF	(United States) Dan Gurney, (United Kingdom) Stirling Moss
1960 - March	12 Hours of Sebring	Maserati T61	DNF	(United States) Dan Gurney, (United Kingdom) Stirling Moss
1960 - March	12 Hours of Sebring	Maserati T61	DNF	(United States) Carroll Shelby, (United States) Masten Gregory
1960 - March	12 Hours of Sebring	Maserati T61	DNF	(United States) Jim Rathmann, (United States) George Koehne
1960 - March	12 Hours of Sebring	Maserati T61	DNS	(United States) Jim Rathmann, (United States) George Koehne
1960 - March	12 Hours of Sebring	Porsche Carrera	1st (2 litre), 9th Overall	(United States) Jim Rathmann, (United States) George Koehne
1960 - March	12 Hours of Sebring	Porsche Carrera	1st (2 litre), 9th Overall	(United States) Joe Sheppard, (United States) Dick Dungan
1960 - March	12 Hours of Sebring	Corvette	1st (2 litre), 9th Overall	(United States) Jim Jeffords, (United States) Bill Weustoff, (United States) Fred Gamble
1960 - March	12 Hours of Sebring	Corvette	2nd+ 3rd Class 14GT	(United States) Jim Jeffords, (United States) Bill Weustoff, (United States) Fred Gamble
1960 - March	12 Hours of Sebring	Porsche Carrera	DNF	(United States) Jim Jeffords, (United States) Bill Weustoff, (United States) Fred Gamble
1960 - March	12 Hours of Sebring	Porsche Carrera	DNF	(Cuba) Johnny Cuevas, (United States) Ulf Norinder
1960 - March	12 Hours of Sebring	OSCA 750	DNF	(United States) Denise McCluggage, (United States) Pinkie Windridge
1960 - March	12 Hours of Sebring	OSCA 750	DNF	(United States) Denise McCluggage, (United States) Pinkie Windridge
1960 - April	LA Times GP, Riverside	Maserati T61	1st	(United States) Denise McCluggage, (United States) Pinkie Windridge
1960 - April	LA Times GP, Riverside	Maserati T61	1st	(United States) Carroll Shelby
1960 - May	Targa Florio, Sicily	Maserati T61	1st	(Italy) Umberto Maglioli, (Italy) Nino Vaccarella
1960 - May	Targa Florio, Sicily	Maserati T61	DNF (Accident)	(Italy) Umberto Maglioli, (Italy) Nino Vaccarella
1960 - May	Targa Florio, Sicily	Porsche Carrera	22nd	(Italy) Umberto Maglioli, (Italy) Nino Vaccarella
1960 - May	Targa Florio, Sicily	Porsche Carrera	22nd	(United States) Lloyd Casner, (Italy) Nino Todaro
1960 - May	1,000 km Nurburgring, Germany	Maserati T61	22nd	(United States) Dan Gurney, (United Kingdom) Stirling Moss
1960 - May	1,000 km Nurburgring, Germany	Maserati T61	1st	(United States) Dan Gurney, (United Kingdom) Stirling Moss
1960 - May	1,000 km Nurburgring, Germany	Maserati T61	5th	(United States) Dan Gurney, (United Kingdom) Stirling Moss
1960 - May	1,000 km Nurburgring, Germany	Maserati T61	5th	(United States) Masten Gregory, (Italy) Gino Munaron
1960 - May	1,000 km Nurburgring, Germany	Corvette	5th	(United States) Fred Gamble, (United States) Lee Lilley
1960 - May	1,000 km Nurburgring, Germany	Corvette	DNF (Mechanical)	(United States) Fred Gamble, (United States) Lee Lilley
1960 - June	Le Mans 24 Hours, France	Corvette	10th	(United States) Fred Gamble, (United States) Lee Lilley
1960 - June	Le Mans 24 Hours, France	Corvette	10th	(United States) Fred Gamble, (United States) Lee Lilley
1960 - June	Le Mans 24 Hours, France	Maserati T61	10th	(United States) Masten Gregory, (United States) Chuck Daigh
1960 - June	Le Mans 24 Hours, France	Maserati T61	DNF (Mechanical)	(United States) Masten Gregory, (United States) Chuck Daigh
1960 - June	Le Mans 24 Hours, France	Maserati T61	DNF (Mechanical)	(United States) Masten Gregory, (United States) Chuck Daigh
1960 - June	Le Mans 24 Hours, France	Maserati T61	DNF (Mechanical)	(United States) Lloyd Casner, (United States) Jim Jeffords
1960 - June	Le Mans 24 Hours, France	Maserati T61	DNF (Mechanical)	(United States) Georgio Scarlatti, (Italy) Gino Munaron
1960 - June	Le Mans 24 Hours, France	Maserati T61	DNF (Mechanical)	(United States) Georgio Scarlatti, (Italy) Gino Munaron
1960 - June	Road America 500, U.S.A.	Maserati T61	1st	(United States) Georgio Scarlatti, (Italy) Gino Munaron
1960 - June	Road America 500, U.S.A.	Maserati T61	1st	(United States) Jim Jeffords
1960 - June	Solitude GP F2, Germany	Behra-Porsche F2	1st	(United States) Lloyd Casner
1960 - June	Solitude GP F2, Germany	Behra-Porsche F2	DNF (Mechanical)	(United States) Lloyd Casner
1960 - July	German GP Nurburgring, Germany	Porsche F2	5th	(United States) Lloyd Casner
1960 - July	German GP Nurburgring, Germany	Porsche F2	5th	(Germany) Hans Hermann
1960 - July	German GP Nurburgring, Germany	Behra-Porsche F2	5th	(United States) Fred Gamble
1960 - July	German GP Nurburgring, Germany	Behra-Porsche F2	DNS	(United States) Fred Gamble
1960 - August	Swedish GP, Sweden	Maserati T61	2nd	(United States) Fred Gamble
1960 - August	Swedish GP, Sweden	Maserati T61	2nd	(Sweden) Jo Bonnier
1960 - August	Swedish GP, Sweden	Corvette	2nd	(United States) Lloyd Casner
1960 - August	Swedish GP, Sweden	Corvette	1st	(United States) Lloyd Casner
1960 - August	Goodwood TT, England	Corvette	DNS (Road Accident)	(United States) Lloyd Casner
1960 - August	Goodwood TT, England	Corvette	DNS (Road Accident)	(United States) Fred Gamble
1960 - September	Grand Prix of Europe, Monza, Italy	Behra-Porsche F2	DNS (Road Accident)	(United States) Fred Gamble
1960 - September	Grand Prix of Europe, Monza, Italy	Behra-Porsche F2	10th	(United States) Fred Gamble

== Complete Formula One World Championship results ==
(key) (Results in bold indicate pole position; results in italics indicate fastest lap; † indicates shared drive.)

Year	Chassis	Engine(s)	Tyres	Drivers	1	2	3	4	5	6	7	8	9	10
1959	Tec-Mec F415	Maserati 250F1 2.5 L6	D		MON	500	NED	FRA	GBR	GER	POR	ITA	USA	
1959	Tec-Mec F415	Maserati 250F1 2.5 L6	D	(Brazil) Fritz d'Orey									Ret	
1960	Behra-Porsche Porsche	Porsche 547/3 1.5 F4	G		ARG	MON	500	NED	BEL	FRA	GBR	POR	ITA	USA
1960	Behra-Porsche Porsche	Porsche 547/3 1.5 F4	G	(United States) Masten Gregory	12									
1960	Behra-Porsche Porsche	Porsche 547/3 1.5 F4	G	(United States) Fred Gamble									10	
1961	Cooper T53; Lotus 18	Climax FPF 1.5 L4	D		MON	NED	BEL	FRA	GBR	GER	ITA	USA		
1961	Cooper T53; Lotus 18	Climax FPF 1.5 L4	D	(United States) Masten Gregory	DNQ	DNS	10	12	11					
1961	Cooper T53; Lotus 18	Climax FPF 1.5 L4	D	(United Kingdom) Ian Burgess		DNS	DNS	14	14	12				

== Racers ==
- Lloyd Casner was killed driving a Maserati during testing at the 1965 Le Mans event.
- Masten Gregory
- Dan Gurney
- Carroll Shelby
- Chuck Daigh
- Stirling Moss
- Fred Gamble (racing driver)
- Jim Rathmann
- Rodger Ward
- Juan Fangio (Parade lap at Cordova, Argentina 1960)
- Chuck Daigh
- Jo Bonnier
- Jack McAfee
- Jim Jeffords
- Bill Weustoff
- Fred Windridge
- Joe Sheppard
- Dick Dungan
- Pinkie Windridge
- Denise McCluggage
- Umberto Maglioli
- Nino Vaccarella
- Nino Todaro
- Gino Munaron
- Georgio Scarlatti
- Lee Lilley
- Dave Lane
- Johnny Cuevas
