= Behra-Porsche =

French racing car constructor

Behra-Porsche as a Formula One chassis constructor
- Base: France
- Founder(s): Jean Behra

Formula One World Championship career
- Engines: Porsche 547/3 1.5 F4
- Entrants: Jean Behra; Camoradi International
- First entry: 1959 Monaco Grand Prix
- Last entry: 1960 Italian Grand Prix
- Races entered: 4 (2 starts)
- Race victories: 0
- Constructors' Championships: 0
- Drivers' Championships: 0
- Pole positions: 0
- Fastest laps: 0

Behra-Porsche was a Formula One constructor which entered four World Championship Grands Prix across the 1959 and 1960 seasons. The constructor started - and finished - two races, both in the 1960 season, but scored no championship points in the process.

Jean Behra was a French racing driver, who by the end of the 1950s was a stalwart of the Formula One paddock. He had achieved success earlier in the decade with the Maserati team, but was contracted to Ferrari for the 1959 season. Despite his obligations to Ferrari, Behra commissioned Porsche to build a Formula 2 single-seater car, taking componentry from the Porsche 718 'RSK'. The chassis for the car had already been designed by former Maserati engineer Valerio Colotti, who subsequently adapted it so that components from the 718 RSK could be used. The vehicle was named the 'Behra-Porsche' and painted in the Bleu de France colour of the Frenchman's homeland.

The car made an initial outing at the 1959 Monaco Grand Prix, with Behra's good friend Maria Teresa de Filippis at the wheel. De Filippis was unable to qualify, however, and the car did not start the race.

After the French Grand Prix, Behra was dismissed from the Ferrari team following an altercation with the team manager. This meant, however, that Behra was able to race the Behra-Porsche himself in the upcoming German Grand Prix.

The German Grand Prix was the only one ever to be held at the AVUS circuit in Berlin. Not only had Behra entered the Behra-Porsche into the Grand Prix, he had also entered his RSK sportscar into a support race. It was in this race that Behra crashed fatally, spinning out over the top of the infamous AVUS banking and being thrown from his vehicle. Behra hit a flagpole and fell to the ground, fracturing his skull and breaking many ribs. It was concluded by a doctor on the scene that he died on impact.

Following Behra's death, the Behra-Porsche was acquired by Lloyd Casner for the Camoradi International team. The first of the Behra-Porsche's two outings in 1960 was in the Argentine Grand Prix on 7 February. Masten Gregory took 12th place in the race, four laps behind the leader. Towards the latter half of the season, Fred Gamble became the last driver to pilot the Behra-Porsche in a World Championship Grand Prix. The 1960 Italian Grand Prix, which was noted for a boycott by the three British teams, saw Gamble take 10th place. He was the last finisher, nine laps down on the leader.

== Complete Formula One World Championship results ==
(key)

Year	Entrant	Chassis	Engine	Tyres	Driver	1	2	3	4	5	6	7	8	9	10	WCC	Pts
1959	Dr Ing F. Porsche KG	Behra-Porsche RSK	Porsche 547/3 1.5 F4	D		MON	500	NED	FRA	GBR	GER	POR	ITA	USA		NC	0
1959	Dr Ing F. Porsche KG	Behra-Porsche RSK	Porsche 547/3 1.5 F4	D	(Italy) Maria Teresa de Filippis	DNQ										NC	0
1959	Jean Behra	Behra-Porsche RSK	Porsche 547/3 1.5 F4	D	(France) Jean Behra						DNS					NC	0
1960	Camoradi International	Behra-Porsche RSK	Porsche 547/3 1.5 F4	D		ARG	MON	500	NED	BEL	FRA	GBR	POR	ITA	USA	NC	0
1960	Camoradi International	Behra-Porsche RSK	Porsche 547/3 1.5 F4	D	(United States) Masten Gregory	12										NC	0
1960	Camoradi International	Behra-Porsche RSK	Porsche 547/3 1.5 F4	D	(United States) Fred Gamble									10		NC	0
