= Fred Gamble (racing driver) =

American racing driver (1932–2024)

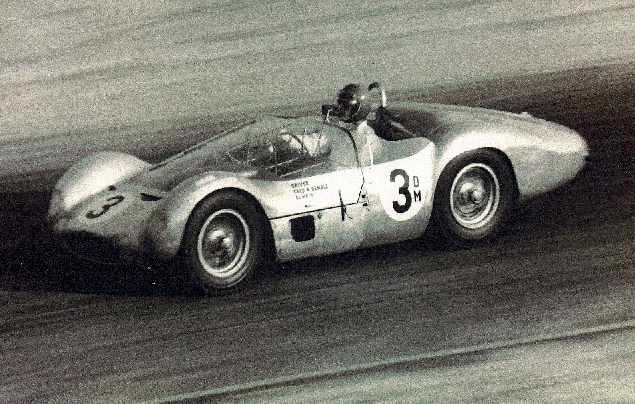
- Gamble at the 1961 U.S. National Championship in a Maserati Tipo 61.
- Born: March 17, 1932; Pittsburgh, Pennsylvania, U.S.
- Died: March 30, 2024 (aged 92); Honolulu, Hawaii, U.S.

Formula One World Championship career
- Nationality: (United States) American
- Active years: 1960
- Team: Behra-Porsche
- Entries: 1
- Championships: 0
- Wins: 0
- Podiums: 0
- Career points: 0
- Pole positions: 0
- Fastest laps: 0
- First entry: 1960 Italian Grand Prix

Frederick Kesner Gamble (March 17, 1932 – March 30, 2024) was an American racecar driver. He participated in one Formula One Grand Prix, the 1960 Italian Grand Prix, on September 4, 1960. He finished 10th overall driving the Formula Two Behra-Porsche, scoring no Championship points. Gamble died in Honolulu, Hawaii on March 30, 2024, at the age of 92.

== Early life ==
Fred Kesner Gamble was born on March 17, 1932, in Pittsburgh, Pennsylvania. His family moved to Fort Lauderdale, Florida, after the Second World War. During his time at Fort Lauderdale, he was exposed to sports cars, which gave him a passion for motorsports. He would later get a job at a local race track selling refreshments, which allowed him to make connections with racers. Gamble graduated from Fort Lauderdale High School in 1950 and joined the Air Force as a radio operator during The Korean War. After leaving the military, he attended California Polytechnic State University, and later the University of Florida. He was involved with racing clubs at both schools.

== Racing ==
During his last semester in college, Gamble spotted a disassembled Crosley Hot Shot, and talked its owner into a straight trade for his Zündapp motorcycle. Gamble discarded the body and in the local VW dealership (was a part-time salesman) fabricated a feather-weight aluminum body, stock 750cc motor and called his HM special a Gambini MK1 and on his soon to earn international license, himself – Fredrico Gambini!

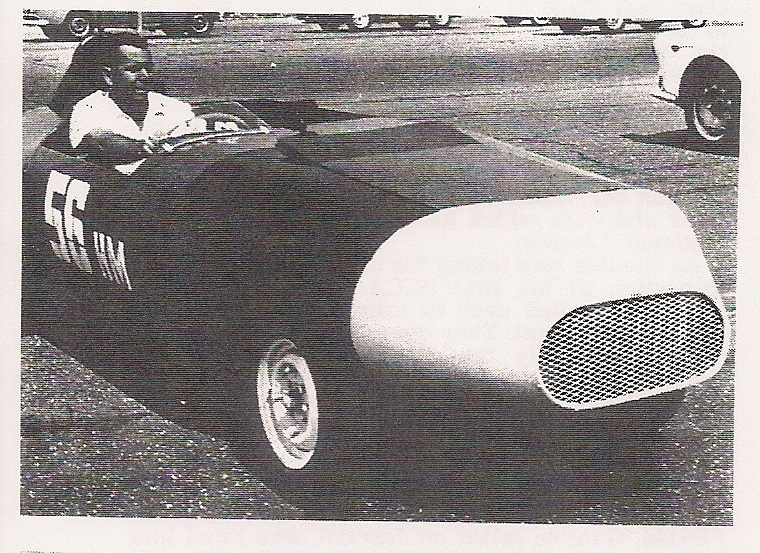
The Gambini MK1, the 750 cc special built by Fred Gamble to get his start in motor racing – 1958 Florida

In his first national race (May 1958, Gainesville, Georgia), Gamble had a long race duel with a Le Mans DB and finished second in H Modified. Gamble was hired by Jarrard Motors of Pensacola, a foreign car importer for Renault, Triumph, AC Cars and Borgward servicing 200 dealers in eleven south east states. He was the assistant advertising manager and Triumph race team driver with Bill Kimberly. Jarrard raced a team of 3 TR3s and Gamble was assigned to Sedan class battles with the new TR10 (1,000 cc Standard 10) to dice with VWs, Renault Dauphines, and Morris Minors.

When Jarrard decided not to run the Factory Triumph team at Sebring in 1959, and stop his SCCA racing, Gamble resigned and returned to South Florida, to race an MGA for a University of Miami student.

From the mid-1950s, Gamble had been a motoring journalist and contributor to Chris Economaki's National Speed Sport News, The SCCA magazine Sports Car, Denise McCluggage's Competition Press and Road & Track.

At a mid-summer SCCA race in Miami, while racing the MGA, Gamble met Lloyd "Lucky" Casner, ex airline pilot, car dealer and successful racing driver in a string of cars – MGs, Alfas, AC Bristols, Maseratis and Ferraris. Lucky announced at the victory presentation that he wanted to go race in Europe (didn't we all?). He invited the amateur racers to contribute to a fund to finance his idea. He got a good laugh from the crowd.

Gamble knew Casner was a hustler/promoter, introduced himself with the suggestion he go along as a helper, publicist & pay his own way as a motoring journalist. Casner suggested a partnership to make his idea happen.

Gamble put on his thinking cap, college degree in advertising/PR/Journalism/Marketing, and inspired by Ecurie Ecosse, the Scottish National Racing Team that spawned Jim Clark and later Jackie Stewart, created the concept of America's "Olympic Team" of motor racing to challenge the Europeans for World Championships.

Casner's amateur racing team of friends called themselves Camoradi Racing Team (Casner Motor Racing Division) as a tax write-off probably. So the proposed professional team was incorporated as Camoradi USA, America's first industry sponsored racing team with the best drivers from all race series in the best cars that could be acquired.

"Lucky" was an understatement. Goodyear was just getting into sportscar racing (Jan 59) and signed up with substantial financial support and all tires needed. Chevrolet's president, Ed Cole and Zora Duntov, signed up with covert financial support (Engineering Dept.), two Corvettes with all competition options, funneled thru Don Allen Chevrolet, Miami. "Covert" because of an industry management ban on racing support. These first two backers opened the corporate doors to Shell/BP, Exide, Champion, DA Lubricants, Koni, Dow and Guest Airways (Mexico to Paris via Miami).

Casner took off to Europe in September (59) and approached bankrupt Maserati who had their new Birdcage T61, a world beater but no finances to race a factory team. Camoradi was their answer for 1960. Casner also formed an alliance with Porsche's Huschke Von Hanstein and bought two cars from the late Jean Behra's estate – a lightweight Carrera and the special Behra-Porsche F2, which served as a test bed and prototype for Porsche's 1960 F2 cars and 1962 F1 1,500cc Formula.

Due to his long association with Maserati, Stirling Moss muscled his way into Camoradi, thus polluting the all-American idea. Camoradi's driver roster: Jim Rathman, Roger Ward, Carroll Shelby, Masten Gregory, Dan Gurney, Juan Fangio(Parade lap at Cordova, Argentina 1960), Chuck Daigh, Jo Bonnier, Jack Mcafee, Jim Jeffords, Bill Weustoff, Fred Windridge, Joe Sheppard, Dick Dungan, Pinkie Windridge, Denise McCluggage, Umberto Maglioli, Nino Vaccarella, Nino Todaro, Gino Munaron, Giorgio Scarlatti, Lucky Casner, Lee Lilley, Fred Gamble, Dave Lane, and Johnny Cuevas.

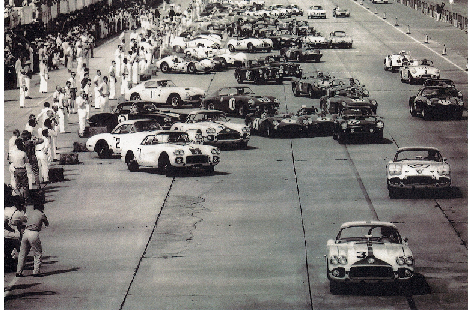
Fred Gamble in Corvette #3 - 1960 Sebring 12 Hours

Camoradi "works" Maseratis, led every World Sports Car Championship race of 1960, and won only 1,000 km Nurburgring with Gurney/Moss. Led Nassau 1959 (Shelby DNF Mechanical), Porsche RSK 2 Liter winner (Bonnier), GT winner Porsche Carrera (Cuevas); 1960 1,000 km Buenos Aires (Gurney/Gregory DNF Mechanical and accident); Argentine GP (Gregory Behra-Porsche); Havana GP for Sports Cars – 8 car entre, winning overall Moss Maserati, 2 Liter Gregory Porsche RSK, GT Corvette Jeffords, under 2 liter GT Cuevas Porsche Carrera; Sebring 12 hour, largest team entry ever of 8 cars, 3 Maseratis (Gurney/Moss led 8 hours DNF Mechanical), 2 Porsche Carrera (under 2 liter GT winner and 2nd OA GT Sheppard/Dungan), 2 Corvettes Jeffords/Weustoff/Gamble (Gamble drove 12 hours solo – only one of two known to have done this – earned press notice as "iron man Gamble"). OSCA 750 (McCluggage/Windridge DNF).

At the Nurburgring, Gamble qualified the "Yank Tank" Corvette 3rd among the big GTs, several 250 GT Ferraris but did not get to drive in the race as co-driver Lee Lilley started the race and DNF with wheel bearing failure. Gurney/Moss won overall in the team's T61 Maserati, Gregory/Munaron 4th.

Off to Le Mans 24 hours, Gregory/Daigh led with the famed Streamliner Birdcage Maserati, set a 3-liter lap record and top speed record of 170Mph, DNF engine failure, other two long tail Maseratis DNF with electrical faults. Gamble/Lilley drove their Corvette conservatively to finish 10th OA.

All Camoradi Maseratis were prepared and maintained by the factory and in Europe race managed by Maserati. Camoradi's role was primarily financial. Gamble was the only full-time principal in Europe, living in Modena, Casner frequently back in Miami.

Sad ending to Gamble's Le Mans story was to find out years later they had been excluded due to insufficient miles covered under the index of performance rules. Even though at the race awards event, they were announced as 10th OA and awarded their participants medals. In 9th OA, just ahead of Gamble/Lilley was the 1959 OA winner Aston-Martin DBR1 and in 8th the Cunningham Corvette of Fitch/Grossman.

Gamble was approved to drive the Behra-Porsche in the 1960 German GP where the car was used by the factory in practice. Porsche manager Von Hanstein changed his mind at the last minute and denied Gamble the car as it had a "works" engine installed.

For the GP of Europe at Monza, September 4, 1960, Ferrari pushed the organizers to use the rough high banks to scare off the British rear engine cars. Chapman of Lotus led the boycott, rightly so as his fragile cars would likely have broken up. This boycott opened the entry for Formula Two cars so Gamble entered the Camoradi Behra-Porsche for himself as driver and for starting money! Designer Collotti and builder Neri were in Gamble's pit and were sure the car could run the 500 km race non-stop for fuel. So Gamble paced himself 500 rpm below redline, running 8th OA and 1st Privateer F2, when he was stranded out of fuel, ran to the pits for a can of gas and dashed across the line for 10th. Winner was Phil Hill in his works F1 Ferrari.

Gamble and team mechanic New Zealander Bob Wallace (who stayed in Modena and became Lamborghini's Chief Test Engineer) took the Corvette and a Maserati to the Swedish GP for sports cars. Jo Bonnier drove the Birdcage to 2nd OA behind Moss in the first Lotus 19. Casner won the GT category. Bonnier then took both cars to a super highway and set a Swedish "Land Speed" record in the Maser and GT record in the Corvette.

Gamble had a starting money paid entry in the Goodwood Tourist Trophy race. Moss was the favorite in Rob Walker's 250GT Ferrari. Gamble was confident his long wearing Goodyear tires would be an advantage on this notorious tire grinder circuit (as it was for Dunlop and Avon). Sadly, in southern Sweden after a lunch stop with beer, Wallace apparently dozed off, flipped and destroyed the Corvette.

Gamble left Camoradi in October, dismayed by big spending Lucky Casner, abusing the team's sponsors trust.

At December's 1960 Nassau, Gamble was there as a journalist, looking for a ride as well and was approached by racing patron Frank Harrison of Chattanooga, Tennessee. Harrison had bought the ex-Camoradi Le Mans Streamliner and had just won the U.S.A. pro sports car Championship with Carroll Shelby and Jim Jeffords. Harrison proposal for Gamble to drive his Streamliner Birdcage and 450S Maseratis in National SCCA events, not abuse his cars and learn the circuits for the 1961 season; for 1962, buy the latest Cooper or Lotus and go for a National Championship. If that was achieved, he would go into a Formula One challenge for 1963. A dream opportunity.

Gamble was at Sebring 1961 as a reserve driver for Denise McCluggage and her inexperienced co-driver Alan Eager who might not have been approved for the race. Denise had her 250GT Ferrari, Alan was accepted and they won the GT category.

Gamble started the 1961 season at the first National race at Marlboro, Maryland, finishing second to Bob Holbert (lap record holder). He drove through the first half of the season, leading in points after several races but the team was coming unraveled in discord due to a difficult shop manager. This could not be resolved so Gamble left the Harrison operation and racing. He moved to New York and landed a Job as Assistant Advertising Manager, Standard-Triumph North America for the introduction of the TR4. Gamble and his Triumph boss Mike Cook pioneered the Triumph competition program, which was soon adopted by other manufacturers (another story). Also Gamble and Cook "GodFathered" Bob Tullius which evolved into his extremely successful Group 44.

At the end of the 1961 year, the SCCA announced its season champions and Gamble was 3rd in points to Roger Penske and Walt Hansgen.

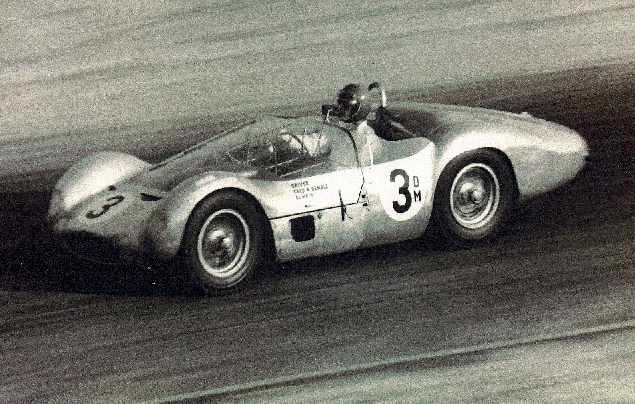
1961 U.S. National Championship - Gamble in a Type 61 Maserati

Summer of 1962, Carroll Shelby presented his first Cobra to Ford, won their support and went the New York to show off his new car to the International Motor Press Association. Gamble was a member. He and Shelby sat together at the luncheon and Carroll said he had to set up a company to produce his Cobras. He hired Gamble as his first Sales Manager. Off to Venice, California. Two months later at the Riverside Sports Car GP and the first race for the Cobra, Shelby and Gamble got together with Goodyear's General Manager of Racing, Tony Webner. Over drinks and dinner Webner expounded his plans to expand Goodyear in racing and he needed another assistant. Shelby was the western states Goodyear racing tire distributor and commented that he needed Goodyear as well Ford's support to go to Europe and "kick Enzo Ferrari's ass" for the World GT Championship. The result was Goodyear bought Gamble. He, Webner and Shelby schemed through the 1963 season to convince Goodyear management to approve an International Racing Tire Division. Gamble was appointed its founding Director.

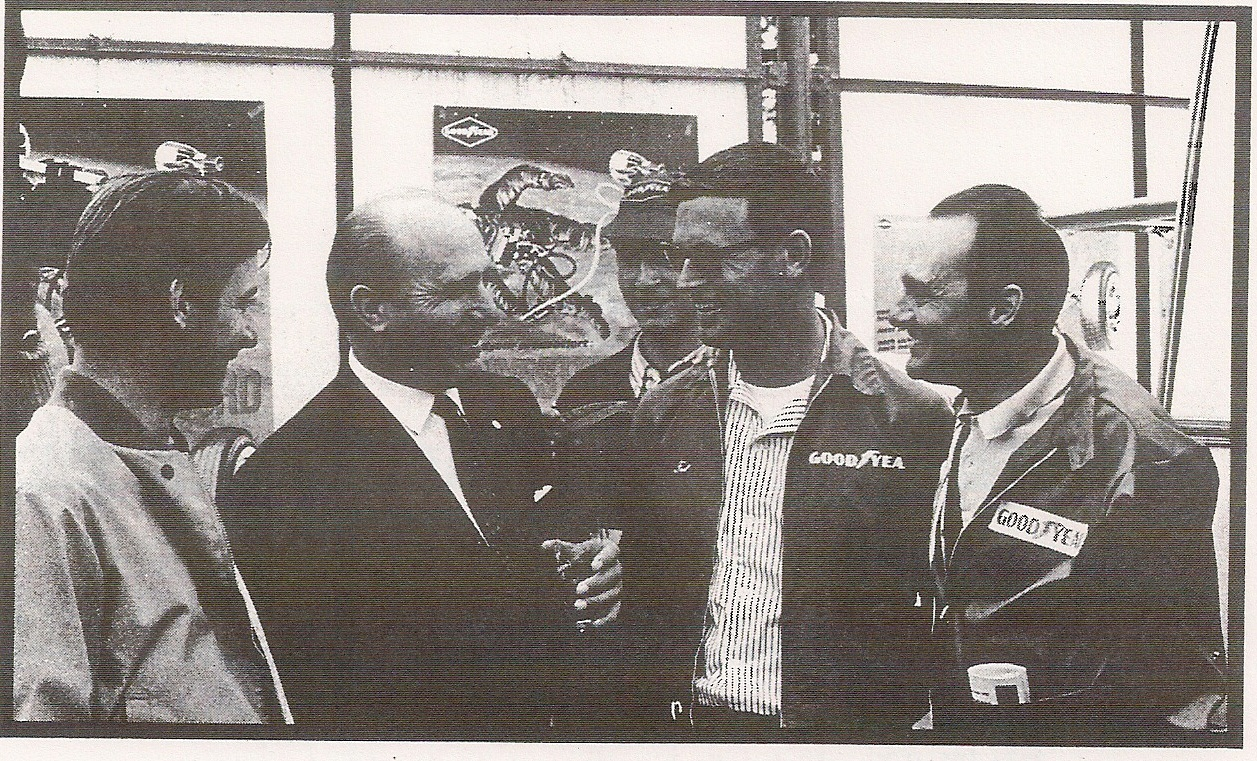
Nürburgring 1967 with Juan Fangio, Gamble and Walter Koenig

February 1964, Gamble and his Chief Engineer Walt DeVinney established their headquarters at the Goodyear plant in Wolverhampton, England. In just 5 years, Gamble and his team had racked up seven World Championships and 3 Le Mans victories (Ferrari 1965, Ford 1966–1967), Goodyear's first Formula One win (Ginther/Honda-Mexico 65) and Gurney's historic All-American 1967 Belgian GP win.

Gamble turned over Goodyear Racing in 1968 to Leo Mehl and transferred to General Management. Gamble's collection photos, video and memorabilia are at the Watkins Glen research center, Watkins Glen, New York in 3 sections: Goodyear the early years, Camoradi USA and Gamble personal.

== Film involvements ==
- The Green Helmet (1961)
- Grand Prix (1966)
- Chitty Chitty Bang Bang (1968)

== Complete Formula One results ==
(key)

Year	Entrant	Chassis	Engine	1	2	3	4	5	6	7	8	9	10	WDC	Points
1960	Camoradi USA	Behra-Porsche Special	Porsche	ARG	MON	500	NED	BEL	FRA	GBR	POR	ITA; 10	USA	NC	0
