= Masten Gregory =

American racing driver (1932–1985)

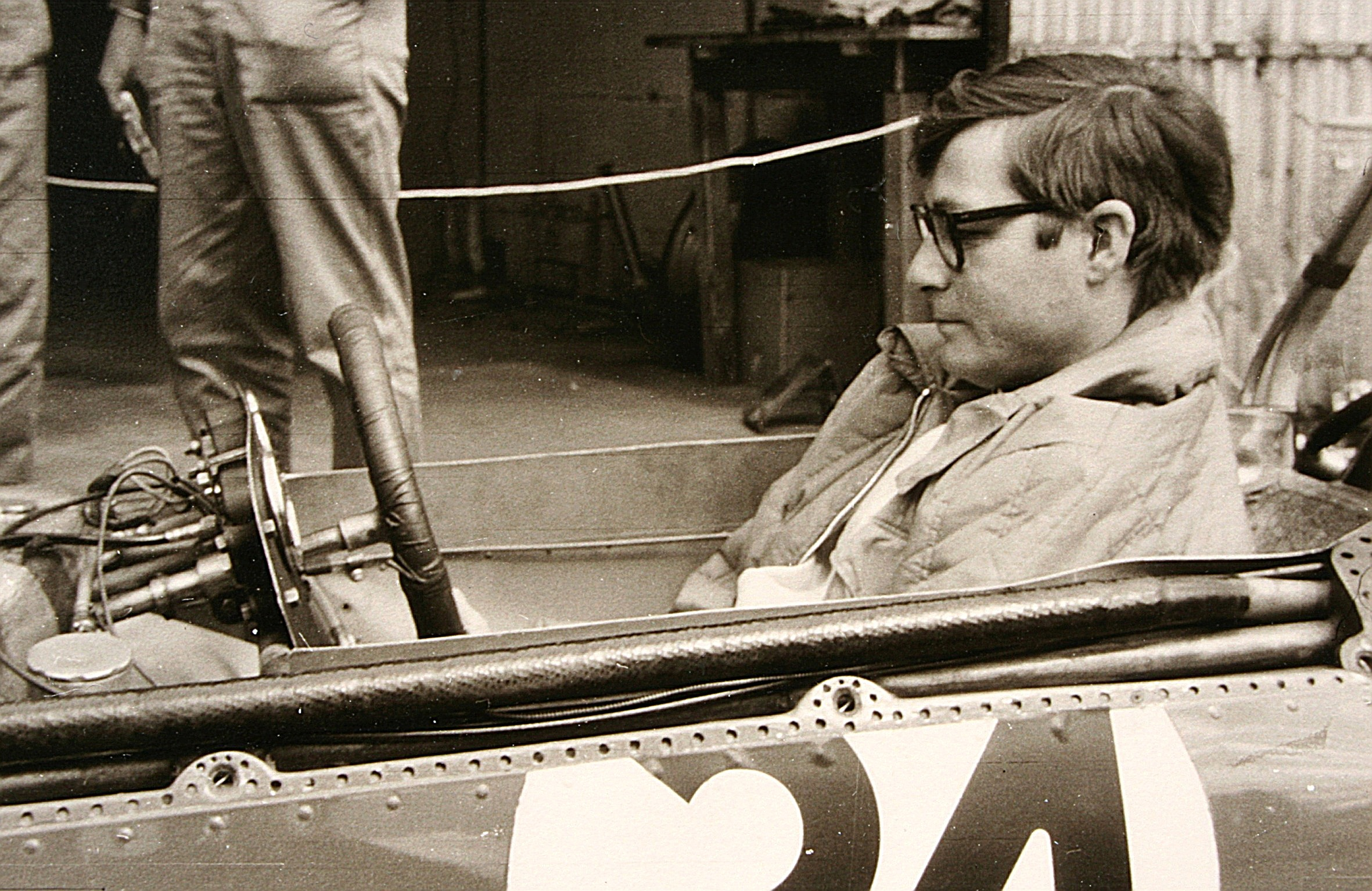
- Gregory at the 1965 German Grand Prix
- Born: February 29, 1932; Kansas City, Missouri, U.S.
- Died: November 8, 1985 (aged 53); Porto Ercole, Tuscany, Italy
- Relatives: Charles James (ex-brother-in-law)

Formula One World Championship career
- Nationality: (United States) American
- Active years: 1957−1963, 1965
- Team(s): Centro Sud, privateer Maserati, BRM, Cooper, Camoradi, BRP, privateer Lotus, Parnell
- Entries: 46 (38 starts)
- Championships: 0
- Wins: 0
- Podiums: 3
- Career points: 21
- Pole positions: 0
- Fastest laps: 0
- First entry: 1957 Monaco Grand Prix
- Last entry: 1965 Italian Grand Prix

24 Hours of Le Mans career
- Years: 1955, 1957−1966, 1968−1972
- Teams: Ferrari, Jaguars, Ecurie Ecosse, Camoradi, Porsche, BRP, NART, Ford, Filipinetti, Alfa Romeo
- Best finish: 1st (1965)
- Class wins: 2 (1961, 1965)

Masten Gregory (February 29, 1932 − November 8, 1985) was an American racing driver, who competed in Formula One from 1957 to 1965. Nicknamed "the Kansas City Flash", (Note: Gregory was nicknamed The Kansas City Flash for his speed, as well as his upbringing in Kansas City, Missouri. Carroll Shelby described him as "the fastest American to ever [go to Europe] and race a Grand Prix car".) Gregory won the 24 Hours of Le Mans in 1965 with NART.

Gregory participated in 43 Formula One Grands Prix, predominantly with privateer teams; he also competed in numerous non-championship races, winning the 1962 Kanonloppet with BRP. Gregory was also successful in sportscar racing, entering 16 editions of the 24 Hours of Le Mans between 1955 and 1972, winning in 1965 alongside Jochen Rindt, driving the Ferrari 250LM.

== Career ==
Known as the "Kansas City Flash", Masten Gregory was born in Kansas City, Missouri, as the youngest of three children; his elder brother was Riddelle L. Gregory Jr., also a race car driver, and his elder sister Nancy Lee Gregory married, as her second husband, the Anglo-American fashion designer Charles James. An heir to an insurance company fortune, Gregory was well known for his youngish looks and thick eyeglasses, due to his "terrible" eyesight. Although he attended the Pembroke-Country Day School in Kansas City, he left school before completing his senior year, and married Luella Simpson at the age of 19. His parents divorced when he was very young, and his father died when he was three years old. As an adult, Gregory used his inheritance to buy a Mercury-powered Allard, which he drove in his first race, the 50-mile (80 km) SCCA race in Caddo Mills, Texas, in November 1952. He retired from that race due to head gasket failure, but installed a new Chrysler hemi-powered engine in his car to race at Sebring in 1953, where he again retired, this time due to a rear suspension failure. Gregory's first win came in just his third race, in Stillwater, Oklahoma. Changing to a Jaguar, Gregory won several races in America, including the Guardsmans Trophy in Golden Gate Park, San Francisco and a race at Offutt Air Force Base in Omaha, Nebraska. At the end of 1953, Gregory was invited to his first international sports car race - the 1954 1000 km Buenos Aires in Argentina, which he finished in 14th due to water pump problems.

=== Coming to Europe ===
Throughout 1954 and 1955, Gregory competed in European races, usually driving Ferraris. His record includes the Tourist Trophy at Dundrod and the 24 Hours of Le Mans (although his co-driver Mike Sparken retired before Gregory got a chance to drive). He also won the inaugural Nassau Trophy at the Bahamas Speed Week in 1954. Moving back to America in 1956, Gregory entered several SCCA races, often winning. In 1957, he had another attempt at the Argentine 1000 km race, this time winning. This performance got him a drive with Guglielmo Dei's Scuderia Centro Sud, a privateer Formula One team using the Maserati 250F. His first race was the 1957 Monaco Grand Prix, where he scored an impressive third-place finish, the first podium for an American in an F1 Grand Prix. He followed this with a string of good results, coming eighth in the German Grand Prix, and fourth in both the Pescara and Italian Grands Prix. Despite only competing in half of the races, Gregory ended the 1957 season in sixth place in the championship.

Gregory only competed in four Grands Prix in the 1958 season, due to injuries sustained through one of his trademark bailouts when his car was set to crash, this time in a sports car race at Silverstone in England. He did manage a fourth place at the Italian Grand Prix, and a sixth in the last race of the year, this Moroccan Grand Prix. Moving to Cooper-Climax for the 1959 season alongside Jack Brabham and Bruce McLaren, he scored two podium finishes - a third place at the Dutch Grand Prix, and a career-best second at the Portuguese Grand Prix. However, he missed the final two races of the season, again due to injuries sustained jumping from a car moments before it crashed. He finished eighth in the Championship, and with teammate Brabham winning the World Championship, Cooper won their first Constructor's Championship. Gregory scored a pole position and set a course record at the non-Championship race at Aintree, but his contract with Cooper was not renewed for the following year.

Gregory's early years of competition were marked by many crashes, often the result of pushing sub-par machinery past its ability. He flipped a thankfully rollbar-equipped Maserati at the Venezuelan Grand Prix in 1957, totalled two sports cars in 1958, and another two in 1959 (a Lister-Jaguar and a Tojeiro-Jaguar). In the latter of these incidents he broke his leg and shoulder, keeping him away from his Formula 1 commitments. In 1960, trying to qualify an outdated Cooper-Maserati at the Nürburgring for the 1960 German Grand Prix (which was a Formula Two race that year), he went off the track and was thrown clear of the car. After this period, however, his driving style matured and he began to develop a reputation as an elegant and careful driver.

Gregory continued in Formula One until 1965, but mainly with uncompetitive independent teams. He was unable to reproduce the results he obtained early in his career, his best being a sixth at the 1962 United States Grand Prix at Watkins Glen with the UDT Laystall team, in a Lotus 24. Running fourth, just behind eventual winner Dan Gurney at the French Grand Prix, Gregory retired with ignition problems, losing possibly his best chance at a maiden Grand Prix victory. Gregory did manage a win in the non-Championship 1962 Kanonloppet race at Karlskoga in Sweden, but this race did not feature any top teams.

=== After Formula One ===
After his release from Cooper, Gregory also went back to competing in sports car races, setting the overall fastest lap at the 1960 24 Hours of Le Mans. He won the 1961 1000 km Nürburgring, driving alongside Lloyd "Lucky" Casner in a Maserati Tipo 61 for the America Camoradi Racing Team. In the same year, Gregory finished fifth in the 24 Hours of Le Mans in a Porsche RS61 Spyder. 1962 saw Gregory win the Canadian Grand Prix sports car race at Mosport Park in a Lotus 19-Climax. In 1964, Gregory again competed in the 24 Hours of Le Mans, this time in a Ford GT40. He retired from the race in the fifth hour due to gearbox difficulties. The following year, Gregory teamed up with the man who was to become 1970 Formula One World Champion, Austrian Jochen Rindt, and the pair won the race in a North American Racing Team Ferrari 250 LM. 1965 was also the year in which Gregory raced in the Indianapolis 500, starting from the back of the grid and working his way up to 5th before being forced to retire due to an engine problem.

Gregory then began to wind down his motor racing career, continuing to compete in international sports car races with some good results including a second-place finish at the 1966 1000 km race at Monza alongside John Whitmore. Following his good friend Jo Bonnier's death at the 1972 Le Mans race, Gregory stopped racing, and retired to Amsterdam, where he worked as a diamond merchant before operating a glassware business. On November 8, 1985, Gregory died in his sleep of a heart attack at his winter home in Porto Ercole, Italy. He had four children, Masten Jr., Debbie, Scott and Michael. Gregory was inducted into the Missouri Sports Hall of Fame in 2005, the Kansas City C.A.R.B. (Central Auto Racing Boosters) Hall of Fame in 2007 and the Watkins Glen Walk of Fame in 2012. He was inducted into the Motorsports Hall of Fame of America in 2013.

Gregory is in a distinct club of motorsport being only one of nineteen drivers to compete in all three legs of the Triple Crown of Motorsport (Indianapolis 500, 24 Hours of Le Mans and the Monaco Grand Prix) and to have won at least one of those events. The others are: Louis Chiron, Jack Brabham, Jim Clark, Graham Hill (who won all three), Dan Gurney, Jochen Rindt (who won two - Le Mans and Monaco), Mario Andretti, Mark Donohue, Jackie Stewart, Denny Hulme, Danny Sullivan, Vern Schuppan, Stefan Johansson, Michele Alboreto, Eddie Cheever, Jacques Villeneuve, Juan Pablo Montoya (who has won two - the Indianapolis 500 and Monaco) and Fernando Alonso (who has won two - Le Mans and Monaco).

== Racing record ==
=== 24 Hours of Le Mans results ===
Year	Team	Co-Drivers	Car	Class	Laps	Pos.	Class Pos.
1955	(France) Mike Sparken	(France) Mike Sparken	Ferrari 750 Monza	S 3.0	23	DNF	DNF
1957	(United Kingdom) D. Hamilton	(United Kingdom) Duncan Hamilton	Jaguar D-Type	S 5.0	299	6th	6th
1958	(United Kingdom) Ecurie Ecosse	(United Kingdom) Jack Fairman	Jaguar D-Type	S 3.0	7	DNF	DNF
1959	(United Kingdom) Ecurie Ecosse	(United Kingdom) Innes Ireland	Jaguar D-Type	S 3.0	78	DNF	DNF
1960	(United States) Camoradi U.S.A. RT	(United States) Chuck Daigh	Maserati Tipo 61	S 3.0	82	DNF	DNF
1961	(Germany) Porsche System Engineering	(United States) Bob Holbert	Porsche 718 RS 61	S 2.0	309	5th	**1st**
1962	(United Kingdom) UTD Laystall Racing Team	(United Kingdom) Innes Ireland	Ferrari 250 GTO	GT; 3.0	165	DNF	DNF
1963	(United States) North American Racing Team	(United Kingdom) David Piper	Ferrari 250 GTO	GT; 3.0	312	6th	**3rd**
1964	(United States) Ford Motor Company	(United States) Richie Ginther	Ford GT40 Mk.I	P 5.0	63	DNF	DNF
1965	(United States) North American Racing Team	(Austria) Jochen Rindt	Ferrari 250LM	P 5.0	348	**1st**	**1st**
1966	(United States) North American Racing Team	(United States) Bob Bondurant	Ferrari 365 P2	P 5.0	88	DNF	DNF
1968	(United States) North American Racing Team	(United States) Charlie Kolb	Ferrari 250LM	S 5.0	209	DNF	DNF
1969	(Switzerland) Scuderia Filipinetti	(Sweden) Jo Bonnier	Lola T70-Chevrolet	S 5.0	134	DNF	DNF
1970	(Italy) Autodelta S.P.A.	(Netherlands) Toine Hezemans	Alfa Romeo T33/3	P 3.0	5	DNF	DNF
1971	(United States) North American Racing Team	(Canada) George Eaton	Ferrari 512S	S 5.0	7	DNF	DNF
1972	(United States) North American Racing Team	(United States) Luigi Chinetti Jr.	Ferrari 365 GTB/4	GT; 5.0	226	DNF	DNF

=== Complete Formula One World Championship results ===
(key)

Year	Entrant	Chassis	Engine	1	2	3	4	5	6	7	8	9	10	11	WDC	Pts
1957	Scuderia Centro Sud	Maserati 250F	Maserati 250F1 2.5 L6	ARG	MON; 3	500	FRA	GBR	GER; 8	PES; 4	ITA; 4				6th	10
1958	Scuderia Centro Sud	Maserati 250F	Maserati 250F1 2.5 L6	ARG; DNA	MON			BEL; Ret	FRA						NC	0
1958	H.H. Gould	Maserati 250F	Maserati 250F1 2.5 L6			NED; Ret	500								NC	0
1958	Owen Racing Organisation	BRM P25	BRM P25 2.5 L4							GBR; DNA	GER	POR			NC	0
1958	Temple Buell	Maserati 250F	Maserati 250F1 2.5 L6										ITA; 4*	MOR; 6	NC	0
1959	Cooper Car Company	Cooper T51	Climax FPF 2.5 L4	MON; Ret	500	NED; 3	FRA; Ret	GBR; 7	GER; Ret	POR; 2	ITA	USA			8th	10
1960	Camoradi International	Behra-Porsche RSK	Porsche 547/6 1.5 F4	ARG; 12											NC	0
1960	Scuderia Centro Sud	Cooper T51	Maserati 250S 2.5 L4		MON; DNQ	500	NED; DNS	BEL	FRA; 9	GBR; 14	POR; Ret	ITA	USA		NC	0
1961	Camoradi International	Cooper T53	Climax FPF 1.5 L4	MON; DNQ	NED; DNS	BEL; 10	FRA; 12	GBR; 11	GER; DNA						NC	0
1961	UDT Laystall Racing Team	Lotus 18/21	Climax FPF 1.5 L4							ITA; Ret	USA; Ret				NC	0
1962	UDT Laystall Racing Team	Lotus 18/21	Climax FPF 1.5 L4	NED; Ret											18th	1
1962	UDT Laystall Racing Team	Lotus 24	BRM P56 1.5 V8		MON; DNQ	BEL; Ret	FRA; Ret			ITA; 12	USA; 6	RSA			18th	1
1962	UDT Laystall Racing Team	Lotus 24	Climax FWMV 1.5 V8					GBR; 7	GER						18th	1
1963	Tim Parnell	Lotus 24	BRM P56 1.5 V8	MON	BEL	NED	FRA; Ret			ITA; Ret					NC	0
1963	Reg Parnell Racing	Lotus 24	BRM P56 1.5 V8					GBR; 11	GER						NC	0
1963	Reg Parnell Racing	Lola Mk4A	Climax FWMV 1.5 V8								USA; Ret	MEX; Ret	RSA		NC	0
1965	Scuderia Centro Sud	BRM P57	BRM P56 1.5 V8	RSA	MON	BEL; Ret	FRA	GBR; 12	NED	GER; 8	ITA; Ret	USA	MEX		NC	0

* Shared drive with Carroll Shelby therefore no points awarded.

=== Complete Formula One Non-Championship results ===
(key) (Races in bold indicate pole position; races in italics indicate fastest lap.)

Year	Entrant	Chassis	Engine	1	2	3	4	5	6	7	8	9	10	11	12	13	14	15	16	17	18	19	20	21
1957	Scuderia Centro Sud	Maserati 250F	Maserati 250F1 2.5 L6	SYR	PAU; 4	GLV	NAP; 5	RMS; 7	CAE	INT; 5	MOD	MOR												
1958	Scuderia Centro Sud	Maserati 250F	Maserati 250F1 2.5 L6	GLV	SYR; Ret	AIN	INT; 3	CAE																
1959	Cooper Car Company	Cooper T51	Climax FPF 2.5 L4	GLV; 5	**AIN**; Ret	INT	OUL	SIL																
1960	Scuderia Centro Sud	Cooper T51	Maserati 250S 2.5 L4	GLV	INT; 6	SIL; Ret	LOM	OUL; Ret																
1961	Camoradi International	Cooper T53	Climax FPF 1.5 L4	LOM	GLV	PAU; DNA	BRX	VIE	AIN; 5	SYR	NAP	LON	SIL	SOL	KAN									
1961	UDT Laystall Racing Team	Lotus 18/21	Climax FPF 1.5 L4													DAN; Ret	MOD; NC	FLG	OUL; 5	LEW	VAL	RAN; Ret	NAT; Ret	RSA; Ret
1962	UDT Laystall Racing Team	Lotus 18/21	Climax FPF 1.5 L4	CAP; 4	BRX; Ret	LOM; Ret	LAV	GLV; 5	PAU	AIN; Ret			MAL; 5	CLP										
1962	UDT Laystall Racing Team	Lotus 24	Climax FWMV 1.5 V8								INT; 8	NAP												
1962	UDT Laystall Racing Team	Lotus 24	BRM P56 1.5 V8												RMS; Ret	SOL; DNA	KAN; 1	MED	DAN; 2	OUL; 6	MEX; 5	RAN	NAT	
1963	Reg Parnell Racing	Lotus 24	BRM P56 1.5 V8	LOM	GLV	PAU	IMO	SYR	AIN	INT	ROM	SOL	KAN; 6	MED	AUT	OUL; Ret	RAN							
1964	Scuderia Centro Sud	BRM P57	BRM P56 1.5 V8	DMT	NWT	SYR; 6	AIN	INT	SOL	MED	RAN													
1965	Scuderia Centro Sud	BRM P57	BRM P56 1.5 V8	ROC; Ret	SYR; Ret	SMT	INT	MED; DSQ	RAN															

== Notes ==
Sporting positions
Preceded by Jean Guichet; Nino Vaccarella	Winner of the 24 Hours of Le Mans; 1965; With: Jochen Rindt	Succeeded by Bruce McLaren; Chris Amon
