= Maria Teresa de Filippis =

Italian racing driver (1926–2016)

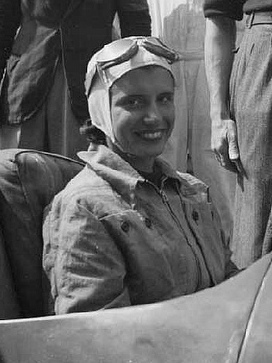
- de Filippis at the 1949 Aosta–Gran San Bernardo hillclimb
- Born: 11 November 1926; Naples, Campania, Italy
- Died: 9 January 2016 (aged 89); Scanzorosciate, Lombardy, Italy

Formula One World Championship career
- Nationality: Italian
- Active years: 1958–1959
- Teams: Behra-Porsche; Non-works Maserati
- Entries: 5 (3 starts)
- Championships: 0
- Wins: 0
- Podiums: 0
- Career points: 0
- Pole positions: 0
- Fastest laps: 0
- First entry: 1958 Monaco Grand Prix
- Last entry: 1959 Monaco Grand Prix

Maria Teresa de Filippis (11 November 1926 – 9 January 2016) was an Italian racing driver, and the first woman to race in Formula One. She participated in five World Championship Grands Prix, debuting on 18 May 1958, but scored no championship points. Though her Formula One racing career was brief, she won races in other series and is remembered as a pioneer in the sport.

== Biography ==
De Filippis was born on 11 November 1926 in Marigliano, Italy. She was the youngest of five children of an Italian count, Serino Francesco De Filippis, and a Spanish noblewoman, Narcisa Anselmi Balaguer Roca de Togores y Ruco y Perpignan. De Filippis' father owned the 16th-century Palazzo Marigliano in Naples, where she grew up. She started displaying an interest in sport in her teenage years, being a keen horse rider and tennis player.

=== Early career ===
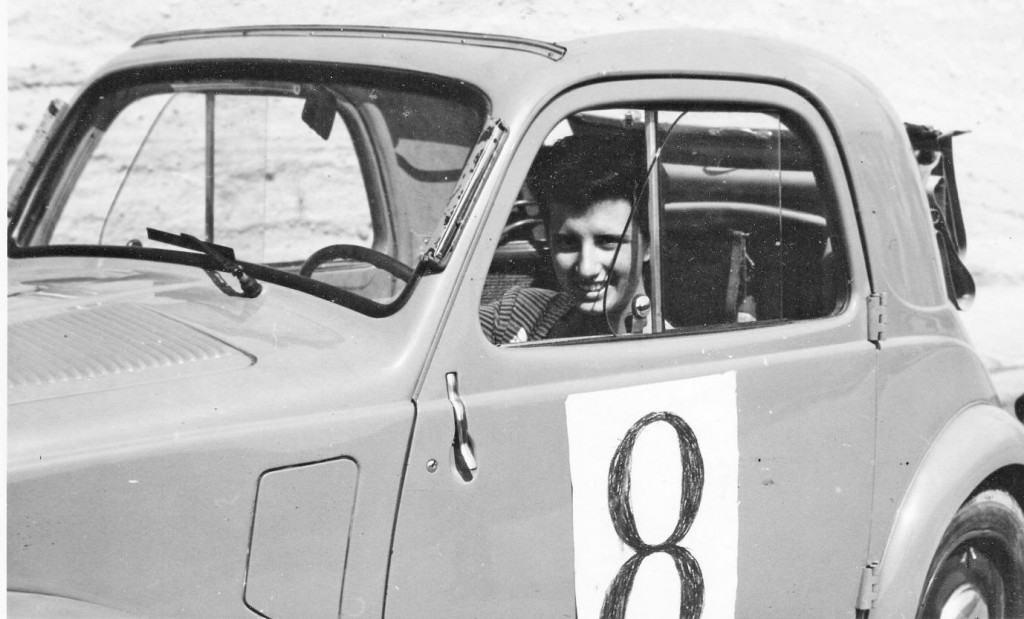
De Filippis debuted in the 1948 Salerno–Cava de' Tirreni race, in a Fiat 500.

In the late 1940s, at the end of World War II, de Filippis developed an interest in motorsport. Despite some reservations from her intimate circle of friends and relatives (two of her brothers told her that she would not be able to go very fast, goading her and making a bet that she would be slow), at the age of 22, de Filippis began her racing career. She won her first race, driving a Fiat 500 on a 10 km drive between Salerno and Cava de' Tirreni. This result gave her the confidence to compete in the Italian sports car championship, where she finished second in the 1954 season. Seeing her potential, Maserati brought her in as the works driver.

In the following years, de Filippis took part in various motor racing events, including hillclimbing and endurance racing. She finished second in a sportscar race supporting the 1956 Naples Grand Prix, driving a Maserati 200S.

=== Formula One ===
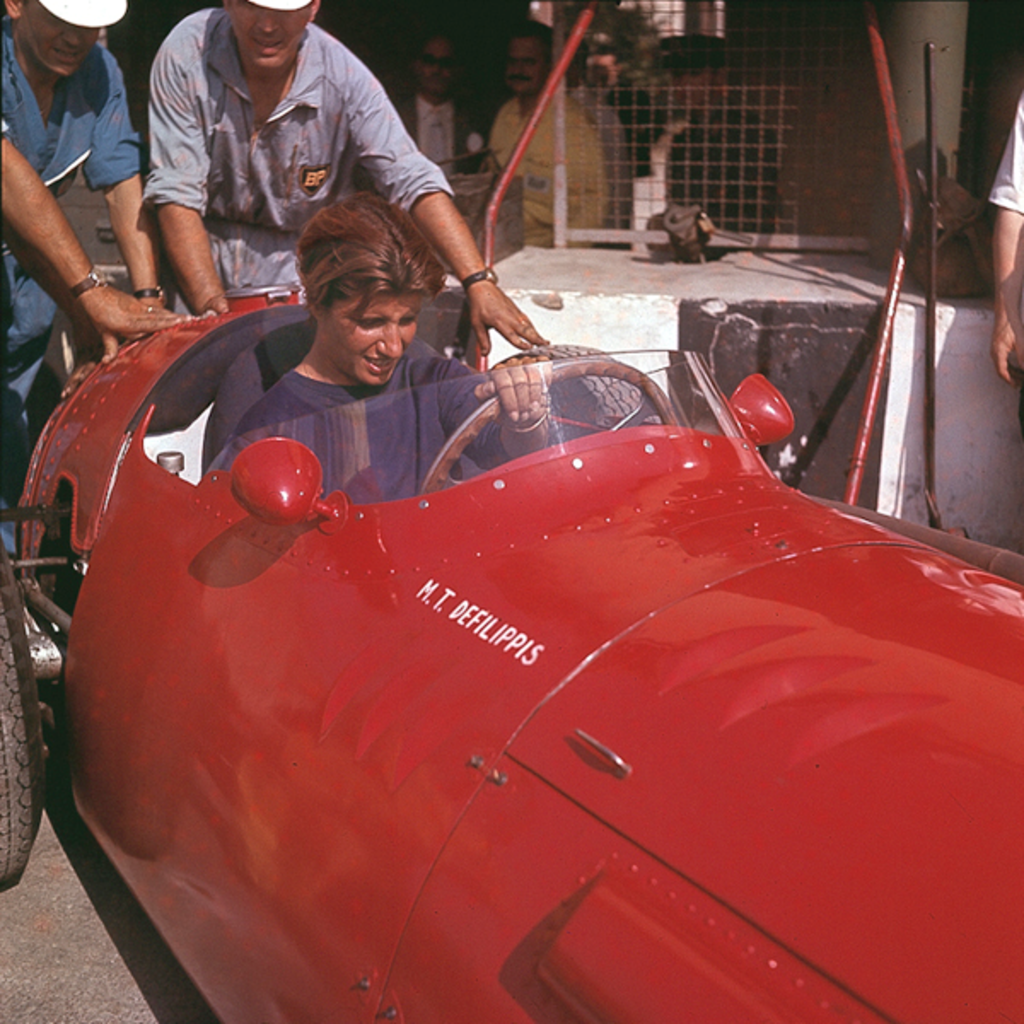
De Filippis in her Maserati 250F s/n 2501/2523 at the Italian Grand Prix (Monza) on 7 September 1958

In 1958, de Filippis was given the chance to drive a Formula One car. Although Maserati was a successful Formula One chassis manufacturer in the 1950s, supplying several teams and winning numerous races (in 1957, Juan Manuel Fangio won the drivers' title in a Maserati 250F, his fifth and final championship win), by 1958 the team had officially withdrawn from the sport but many of the cars remained available to privateers. On 18 May 1958 de Filippis was given the opportunity to enter the Monaco Grand Prix, the second round of the 1958 Formula One season, in one of the 250Fs. Of the 31 entrants only half set a time good enough to qualify, with de Filippis missing out alongside fellow debutant and future Formula One Management and Formula One Administration president Bernie Ecclestone. Ecclestone and de Filippis forged a friendship on the occasion, and remained on good terms for the years to come. De Filippis's time of 1:50.8 was 5.8 seconds behind the qualifying time of the fastest 16 which included future world champions Mike Hawthorn, Jack Brabham, and Graham Hill in his first race. Fangio gave de Filippis plenty of advice during the season. In a 2006 interview, she recalled that Fangio told her, "You go too fast, you take too many risks."

The 1958 Belgian Grand Prix allowed all drivers to compete with no cut-off for a qualifying time. De Filippis qualified in 19th place, nearly 34 seconds off Hawthorn's pole position time and only ahead of a mechanically hindered Ken Kavanagh. Although she was lapped twice by race winner Tony Brooks in the 24 lap race she managed to finish, albeit in 10th and last place after nine other cars failed to finish. This would prove to be her only race finish.

At the following race, the French Grand Prix at Reims-Gueux on 6 July 1958, de Fillipis was prevented from competing. In a 2006 interview, she said the race director dismissed her by telling her that "the only helmet a woman should wear is the one at the hairdresser's".

On the occasion of the 1958 Portuguese Grand Prix in August, de Filippis qualified in last place, more than 15 seconds slower than the car ahead of her. Her race lasted only six laps before her engine failed. On 7 September 1958, she started her home Grand Prix at the Autodromo Nazionale Monza from last place. She completed 57 of the 70 laps before having to retire with engine problems. As the 14th and final retirement out of 21, she was classified as eighth.

In 1959, de Filippis joined the Behra-Porsche RSK team. She entered the Monaco Grand Prix but failed to qualify, her time of 1'47.8 being three seconds off the lowest qualifying pace and a further one second behind teammate Wolfgang von Trips. It turned out to be her final attempt at Grand Prix qualification.

=== Retirement ===
Following the death of Porsche team leader Jean Behra in a racing accident on 1 August 1959 while driving in the sports car support race for the 1959 German Grand Prix at AVUS, de Filippis, devastated by the event, left the circuit and retired from professional racing.

=== Later career ===
Around 1960, de Filippis married Austrian chemist Theodor Huschek, and started a family. She kept away from all forms of motor racing until 1979, when she joined the International Club of Former F1 Grand Prix Drivers. In 1997, she was appointed vice-president. She was also a founding member of the Maserati Club in 2004 and went on to become its chairperson. De Filippis died in January 2016 at the age of 89.

== Legacy ==
De Filippis was a pioneer in motor racing, a sport traditionally dominated by men. No woman would race in Formula One again for a further 15 years until fellow Italian Lella Lombardi competed between 1974 and 1976. Lombardi went on to become the first and as of 2026 only female driver to have finished a Formula One World Championship race in a point-scoring position. Three other women have since then tried to enter a Formula One race, albeit unsuccessfully – Divina Galica, Desiré Wilson and Giovanna Amati.

== Racing record ==
=== Complete Formula One World Championship results ===
(key)

Year	Entrant	Chassis	Engine	1	2	3	4	5	6	7	8	9	10	11	WDC	Points
1958	Maria Teresa de Filippis	Maserati 250F	Maserati Straight-6	ARG	MON; DNQ	NED	500	BEL; 10	FRA	GBR	GER		ITA; Ret	MOR	NC	0
1958	Scuderia Centro Sud	Maserati 250F	Maserati Straight-6									POR; Ret			NC	0
1959	Dr Ing F Porsche KG	Behra-Porsche RSK (F2)	Porsche Flat-4	MON; DNQ	500	NED	FRA	GBR	GER	POR	ITA	USA			NC	0

=== Non-Championship Formula One results ===
(key)

Year	Entrant	Chassis	Engine	1	2	3	4	5	6
1958	Maria Teresa de Filippis	Maserati 250F	Maserati Straight-6	BUE	GLV	SYR; 5	AIN	INT	CAE
1959	Maria Teresa de Filippis	Maserati 250F	Maserati Straight-6	BUE	GLV	AIN	INT; Ret	OUL	SIL
