= Autoweek =

Magazine

- Final issue of Autoweek (November 4, 2019)
- Editor: Natalie Neff
- Former editors: Rory Carroll, Dutch Mandel
- Total circulation: 285,000
- First issue: July 16, 1958
- Final issue: November 4, 2019
- Company: Hearst Communications
- Country: United States
- Based in: Detroit, Michigan
- Website: www.autoweek.com
- ISSN: 0192-9674

Autoweek is a car culture publication and magazine based in Detroit, Michigan. It was first published in 1958 and in 1977 the publication was purchased by Crain Communications Inc, its current brand licensor. The magazine was published weekly and focused on motor sports, new car reviews, and old cars, events and DIY. Autoweek now publishes Autoweek.com. Autoweek brand is owned by Crain Communications Inc., publisher of leading industry trade publications Advertising Age and Automotive News, among others, and is based in Detroit, Michigan.

The Autoweek also includes an Autoweek iPhone and iPad app.

As of November 2019, the publication went digital and was no longer available in printed format. Hearst Magazines entered a multi-year licensing deal with Crain Communications to operate the digital and experiential businesses of Autoweek.

== History ==
Autoweek began publication in 1958 as a bi-weekly motorsports newsletter, titled Competition Press. One of the editors involved with the creation of the magazine was professional racer Denise McCluggage. In 1964, distribution was changed to weekly, the title was changed to Competition Press & Autoweek, and vehicle reviews and industry news were included. The name was shortened to Autoweek in 1975.

In 1977, the magazine was purchased by Crain Communications, Inc. and eventually changed into a magazine in 1986. In 1988, Leon Mandel was named Publisher, a position he held until November, 2001. Leon's son, Dutch Mandel, joined Autoweek in 1997 holding leadership positions culminating with his time as publisher. In 2016, Mandel left Autoweek and Rory Carroll became interim-publisher and later, publisher. In 2019, Patrick Carone became editorial director.

== Editorial direction ==
At its launch, Autoweek (then titled: Competition Press) aimed to provide information for car and racing enthusiasts that was not readily available through other media outlets. The publication gave thorough coverage of major and minor races, as well as auto shows. Auto racing coverage included full grids, qualifying times, speeds, and tires, for both amateur and professional races. As television and cable began increasing motorsports coverage during the 1970s, 1980s, and 1990s Autoweek began to focus more prominently on automotive enthusiasts. As of 2012, in addition to covering auto racing and auto shows, Autoweek covers vehicle trends, reviews and automotive lifestyle stories.
