= Lloyd Casner =

American race car driver (1928–1965)

- Born: August 30, 1928; New York, New York, U.S.
- Died: April 10, 1965 (aged 36); Le Mans, France

Formula One World Championship career
- Nationality: (United States) American
- Active years: 1961
- Team: privateer Lotus
- Entries: (non-championship); 3 (0 starts)
- Championships: 0
- Wins: 0
- Podiums: 0
- Career points: 0
- Pole positions: 0
- Fastest laps: 0
- First entry: 1961 Glover Trophy
- Last entry: 1961 Solitude Grand Prix

Lloyd Perry Casner (August 30, 1928 in Miami, Florida – April 10, 1965 in Le Mans, France) was an American race car driver and the creator of the Casner Motor Racing Division team.

Casner was born in New York City and raised in Miami, the son of Robert H. Casner and Lillian Perry Casner (later Tauber). He graduated from the University of Miami in 1959. An airline pilot by trade, "Lucky" Casner developed an interest in the Maserati Birdcage, and started his team in order to enter the 1960 24 Hours of Le Mans. In August 1960, a Tipo 61 entered by Casner's Team Camoradi, driven by Stirling Moss and Dan Gurney, won the 1000 km of Nürburgring.

Sharing a Birdcage with Masten Gregory, Casner won the 1961 1000km Nürburgring for Team Camoradi, but never won Le Mans. Casner participated in two non-Championship Formula One race meetings, the 1961 Glover Trophy and the 1961 Solitude Grand Prix. He was featured in the 1961 film The Green Helmet. He had a wife, Jean Kesser though they divorced after having two children together.

Casner was killed when he crashed a new Maserati during testing for the upcoming 1965 24 Hours of Le Mans. He was 36 years old.

== Non-Championship Formula One results ==
(key) (Races in bold indicate pole position) (Races in italics indicate fastest lap)

Year	Entrant	Chassis	Engine	1	2	3	4	5	6	7	8	9	10	11	12	13	14	15	16	17	18	19	20	21
1961	Camoradi International	Lotus 18	Climax Straight-4	LOM	GLV; DNS	PAU	BRX	VIE	AIN; WD	SYR	NAP	LON	SIL	SOL; DNS	KAN	DAN	MOD	FLG	OUL	LEW	VAL	RAN	NAT	RSA
