= Denise McCluggage =

American journalist (1927–2015)

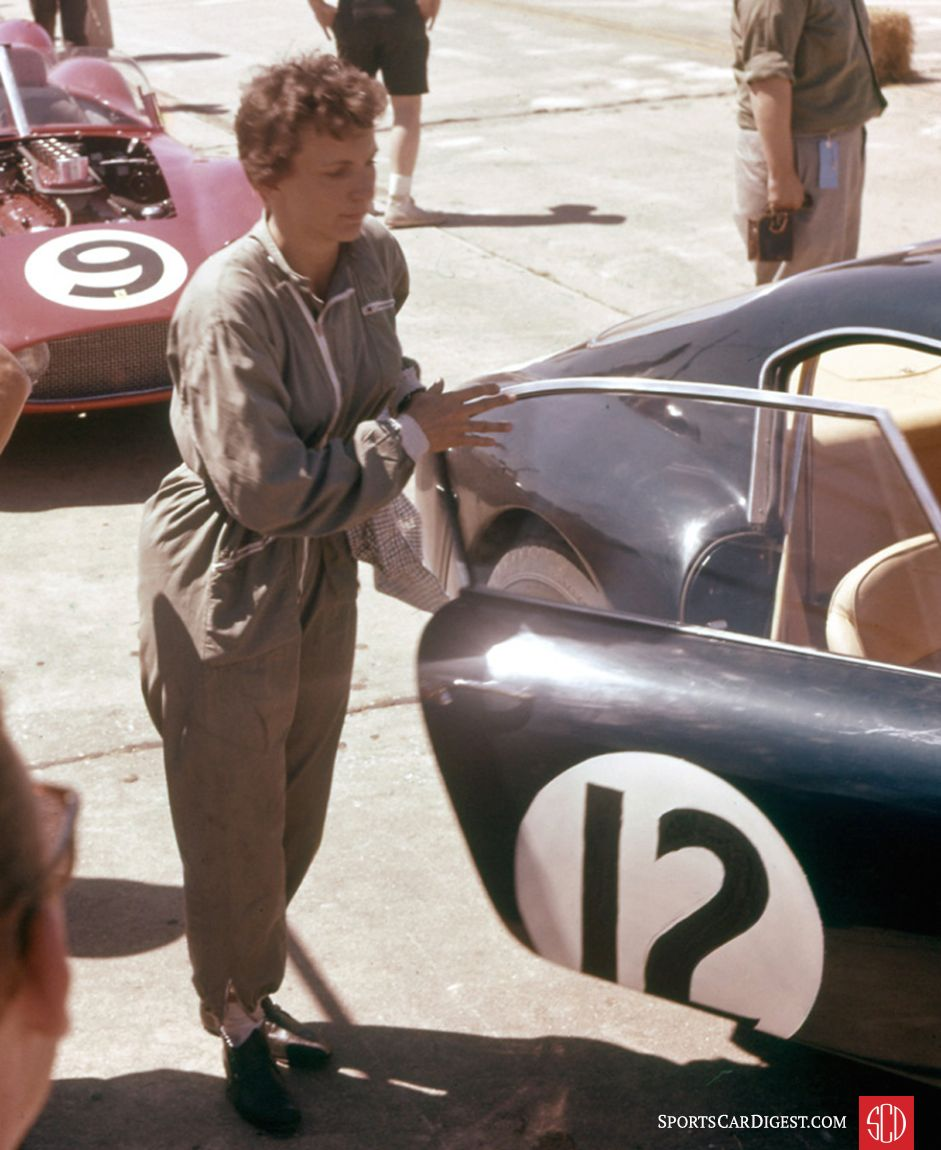

Denise McCluggage (January 20, 1927 – May 6, 2015) was an American auto racing driver, journalist, author and photographer. McCluggage was a pioneer of equality for women in the U.S., both in motorsports and in journalism. She was born in El Dorado, Kansas, and spent her childhood in that state. She graduated Phi Beta Kappa from Mills College in Oakland, California. She began her career as a journalist at the San Francisco Chronicle.

== Auto racing ==
In San Francisco in the early 1950s, while covering a yacht race, McCluggage met Briggs Cunningham, who built the first American cars to race at Le Mans. She bought her first sports car, an MG TC Midget, and began racing at small club events. In 1954, she moved to New York to work at the New York Herald Tribune as a sports journalist. The MG was replaced with a Jaguar XK140; she began to race professionally, and earned the respect of her male counterparts. Her trademark was a white helmet with pink dots. Her racing achievements included winning the grand touring category at Sebring in a Ferrari 250 GT in 1961, and a class win in the Monte Carlo Rally in a Ford Falcon in 1964. She also participated in the Nürburgring 1000 km sports car race. She drove Porsches, Maseratis, and other racing cars of many marques, often with another woman driver, Pinkie Rollo. She ended her racing career in the late 1960s.

== Publishing ==
McCluggage helped launch the U.S. automotive magazine Competition Press, now AutoWeek. She wrote many columns for AutoWeek, and was a Senior Contributing Editor there until her death on May 6, 2015.

== Journalism ==
McCluggage held both the Ken W. Purdy Award for Excellence in Automotive Journalism and the Dean Batchelor Lifetime Achievement Award. She was presented a lifetime achievement award by the IAMA and is the only journalist to have been inducted into the Automotive Hall of Fame. Her weekly syndicated column called "Drive, She Said" appeared in some 90 newspapers across the U.S. and Canada.

McCluggage was the author of a number of books including The Centered Skier and By Brooks Too Broad for Leaping (a collection of pieces from AutoWeek). She wrote the text to accompany Tom Burnside's photographs for American Racing: Road Racing in the 50s and 60s. She also wrote Are You a ‘Woman Driver?’.

== Personal life ==
McCluggage was married for one year to actor Michael Conrad. She died on May 6, 2015, aged 88. She was inducted into the Automotive Hall of Fame in 2001 and Sebring Hall of Fame in 2012. McCluggage was inducted into the Motorsports Hall of Fame of America in 2022. Her ashes are interred at Jay Leno's Big Dog Garage in Burbank, California (according to a MotorTrend Channel video with Jay Leno, published on YouTube on May 8, 2026).
