= 1959 Monaco Grand Prix =

Coordinates: 43°44′4.74″N 7°25′16.8″E

← Previous race	Next race →

Race details
- Date: 10 May 1959
- Official name: XVII Grand Prix Automobile de Monaco
- Location: Circuit de Monaco, Monte Carlo, Monaco
- Course: Street Circuit
- Course length: 3.145 km (1.954 miles)
- Distance: 100 laps, 314.500 km (195.400 miles)
- Weather: Hot, clear

Pole position
Driver	(United Kingdom) Stirling Moss	Cooper-Climax
- Time: 1:39.6

Fastest lap
Driver	(Australia) Jack Brabham	Cooper-Climax
- Time: 1:40.4

Podium
First	(Australia) Jack Brabham	Cooper-Climax
Second	(United Kingdom) Tony Brooks	Ferrari
Third	(France) Maurice Trintignant	Cooper-Climax

The 1959 Monaco Grand Prix was a Formula One motor race held at the Circuit de Monaco on 10 May 1959. It was race 1 of 9 in the 1959 World Championship of Drivers and race 1 of 8 in the 1959 International Cup for Formula One Manufacturers. It was also the 17th Monaco Grand Prix. The race was held over 100 laps of the three kilometre circuit for a race distance of 315 kilometres.

The race was won by Australian racer Jack Brabham driving a Cooper T51 for the factory Cooper Car Company team. It was the first win for Brabham, a future three-time world champion. It was the first World Championship Grand Prix victory by an Australian driver. It was also the first win for the factory Cooper team. Coopers had won races previously in the hands of Rob Walker Racing Team. Brabham finished 20 seconds ahead of British driver Tony Brooks driving a Ferrari 246. A lap down in third was the Cooper T51 of French driver and 1958 Monaco Grand Prix winner Maurice Trintignant of the Rob Walker Racing Team. André Testut was the last Monégasque driver to compete in their home race, since Louis Chiron retired from motorsports the year prior, until Olivier Beretta in 1994.

== Classification ==
=== Qualifying ===
Pos	No	Driver	Constructor	Time	Gap
1	30	(United Kingdom) Stirling Moss	Cooper-Climax	1:39.6	—
2	46	(France) Jean Behra	Ferrari	1:40.0	+0.4
3	24	(Australia) Jack Brabham	Cooper-Climax	1:40.1	+0.5
4	50	(United Kingdom) Tony Brooks	Ferrari	1:41.0	+1.4
5	48	(United States) Phil Hill	Ferrari	1:41.3	+1.7
6	32	(France) Maurice Trintignant	Cooper-Climax	1:41.7	+2.1
7	18	(Sweden) Jo Bonnier	BRM	1:42.3	+2.7
8	38	(United Kingdom) Roy Salvadori	Cooper-Maserati	1:42.4	+2.8
9	16	(United States) Harry Schell	BRM	1:43.0	+3.4
10	20	(United Kingdom) Ron Flockhart	BRM	1:43.1	+3.5
11	26	(United States) Masten Gregory	Cooper-Climax	1:43.2	+3.6
12	6	(Germany) Wolfgang von Trips	Porsche	1:43.8	+4.2
13	22	(New Zealand) Bruce McLaren	Cooper-Climax	1:43.9	+4.3
14	40	(United Kingdom) Graham Hill	Lotus-Climax	1:43.9	+4.3
15	52	(United Kingdom) Cliff Allison	Ferrari	1:44.4	+4.8
16	44	(United Kingdom) Bruce Halford	Lotus-Climax	1:44.8	+5.2
DNQ	34	(United Kingdom) Ivor Bueb	Cooper-Climax	1:44.9	+5.3
DNQ	54	(Italy) Giorgio Scarlatti	Maserati	1:45.0	+5.4
DNQ	12	(Belgium) Alain de Changy	Cooper-Climax	1:45.4	+5.8
DNQ	10	(Belgium) Lucien Bianchi	Cooper-Climax	1:45.4	+5.8
DNQ	4	(Italy) Maria Teresa de Filippis	Behra-Porsche-Porsche	1:47.8	+8.2
DNQ	42	(United States) Pete Lovely	Lotus-Climax	1:47.9	+8.3
DNQ	14	(France) Jean Lucienbonnet	Cooper-Climax	1:50.9	+11.3
DNQ	56	(Monaco) André Testut	Maserati	1:59.1	+19.5

=== Race ===
Pos	No	Driver	Constructor	Laps	Time/Retired	Grid	Points
1	24	(Australia) Jack Brabham	Cooper-Climax	100	2:55:51.3	3	9^{1}
2	50	(United Kingdom) Tony Brooks	Ferrari	100	+ 20.4	4	6
3	32	(France) Maurice Trintignant	Cooper-Climax	98	+ 2 laps	6	4
4	48	(United States) Phil Hill	Ferrari	97	+ 3 laps	5	3
5	22	(New Zealand) Bruce McLaren	Cooper-Climax	96	+ 4 laps	13	2
6	38	(United Kingdom) Roy Salvadori	Cooper-Maserati	83	+ 17 laps	8	
Ret	30	(United Kingdom) Stirling Moss	Cooper-Climax	81	Transmission	1	
Ret	20	(United Kingdom) Ron Flockhart	BRM	64	Spun off	10	
Ret	16	(United States) Harry Schell	BRM	48	Accident	9	
Ret	18	(Sweden) Jo Bonnier	BRM	44	Brakes	7	
Ret	46	(France) Jean Behra	Ferrari	24	Engine	2	
Ret	40	(United Kingdom) Graham Hill	Lotus-Climax	21	Fire	14	
Ret	26	(United States) Masten Gregory	Cooper-Climax	6	Gearbox	11	
Ret	6	(Germany) Wolfgang von Trips	Porsche	1	Collision	12	
Ret	52	(United Kingdom) Cliff Allison	Ferrari	1	Collision	15	
Ret	44	(United Kingdom) Bruce Halford	Lotus-Climax	1	Collision	16	
DNQ	34	(United Kingdom) Ivor Bueb	Cooper-Climax				
DNQ	54	(Italy) Giorgio Scarlatti	Maserati				
DNQ	12	(Belgium) Alain de Changy	Cooper-Climax				
DNQ	10	(Belgium) Lucien Bianchi	Cooper-Climax				
DNQ	4	(Italy) Maria Teresa de Filippis	Behra-Porsche-Porsche				
DNQ	42	(United States) Pete Lovely	Lotus-Climax				
DNQ	14	(France) Jean Lucienbonnet	Cooper-Climax				
DNQ	56	(Monaco) André Testut	Maserati				

Notes

- ^1 – Includes 1 point for fastest lap

== Championship standings after the race ==
Drivers' Championship standings

Pos	Driver	Points
1	(Australia) Jack Brabham	9
2	(United Kingdom) Tony Brooks	6
3	(France) Maurice Trintignant	4
4	(United States) Phil Hill	3
5	(New Zealand) Bruce McLaren	2

Constructors' Championship standings

Pos	Constructor	Points
1	(United Kingdom) Cooper-Climax	8
2	(Italy) Ferrari	6

- Notes: Only the top five positions are included for both sets of standings.

Previous race: 1958 Moroccan Grand Prix	FIA Formula One World Championship; 1959 season	Next race: 1959 Indianapolis 500
Previous race: 1958 Monaco Grand Prix	Monaco Grand Prix	Next race: 1960 Monaco Grand Prix
