= 1960 Italian Grand Prix =

← Previous race	Next race →
- Autodromo Nazionale di Monza layout

Race details
- Date: 4 September 1960
- Official name: XXXI Gran Premio d'Italia
- Location: Autodromo Nazionale di Monza, Monza, Italy
- Course: Permanent road course
- Course length: 10.000 km (6.214 miles)
- Distance: 50 laps, 500.000 km (310.686 miles)
- Weather: Warm, dry

Pole position
Driver	(United States) Phil Hill	Ferrari
- Time: 2:41:4

Fastest lap
Driver	(United States) Phil Hill	Ferrari
- Time: 2:43.6

Podium
First	(United States) Phil Hill	Ferrari
Second	(United States) Richie Ginther	Ferrari
Third	(Belgium) Willy Mairesse	Ferrari

The 1960 Italian Grand Prix was a Formula One motor race held at Monza on 4 September 1960. It was race 9 of 10 in the 1960 World Championship of Drivers and race 8 of 9 in the 1960 International Cup for Formula One Manufacturers.

The race on the 10 km long banked oval version was won by American driver Phil Hill driving a front-engine Ferrari 246 F1 in absence of the mid-engine British cars that already had secured the Championships.

== Race summary ==
The 1960 season had been a frustrating one for Ferrari's Formula One program as they campaigned their obsolete Dino 246, a front-engined car as the rear-mid-engined design established supremacy. The championship had already been decided for Jack Brabham and Ferrari had gone without a victory. Seeing an opportunity, the Italian organizers decided to maximize Ferrari's one advantage —straight line speed — by using the combined Monza road and banked oval circuit, making the fast Monza even faster.

Citing the fragility of their cars and the dangers of the banking, the major British factory teams of the day—Lotus, BRM, and Cooper, all boycotted the event, leading to a cobbled together field of private entrants and Formula 2 cars. Because of this boycott by the British teams, none of the drivers who started the race had previously won a Formula One World Championship Grand Prix.

The race was a processional affair, with Ginther leading at the start and eventually being overtaken by Hill. The pair with teammate Willy Mairesse raced on to a rare 1–2–3 team result for Scuderia Ferrari. The boycott also allowed Scuderia Castellotti to score its only world championship points with Giulio Cabianca finishing fourth in his Cooper T51, two laps behind Hill and ahead of Scuderia Ferrari's fourth entry, Wolfgang von Trips in a 1.5 L-engined (conforming to F2 regulations) Ferrari 156 F2 car.

It was the first victory by an American driver in a Grand Prix since Jimmy Murphy at the 1921 French Grand Prix, and, excluding the Indy 500, the first by an American in the Formula One World Championship.

It was the last Formula One World Championship victory by a front-engined car, although the Ferguson P99 won the non-championship Gold Cup at Oulton Park in 1961.

== Classification ==
=== Qualifying ===
Pos	No	Driver	Constructor	Time	Gap
1	20	(United States) Phil Hill	Ferrari	2:41.4	—
2	18	(United States) Richie Ginther	Ferrari	2:43.3	+1.9
3	16	(Belgium) Willy Mairesse	Ferrari	2:43.9	+2.5
4	2	(Italy) Giulio Cabianca	Cooper-Castellotti	2:49.3	+7.9
5	36	(Italy) Giorgio Scarlatti	Cooper-Maserati	2:49.7	+8.3
6	22	(West Germany) Wolfgang von Trips	Ferrari	2:51.9	+10.5
7	6	(United Kingdom) Brian Naylor	JBW-Maserati	2:52.4	+11.0
8	4	(Italy) Gino Munaron	Cooper-Castellotti	2:53.1	+11.7
9	34	(Italy) Alfonso Thiele	Cooper-Maserati	2:55.6	+14.2
10	26	(West Germany) Hans Herrmann	Porsche	2:58.3	+16.9
11	8	(United Kingdom) Arthur Owen	Cooper-Climax	3:01.5	+20.1
12	24	(West Germany) Edgar Barth	Porsche	3:02.1	+20.7
13	10	(West Germany) Wolfgang Seidel	Cooper-Climax	3:07.0	+25.6
14	28	(United States) Fred Gamble	Behra-Porsche-Porsche	3:10.6	+29.2
15	12	(Italy) Piero Drogo	Cooper-Climax	3:11.9	+30.5
16	30	(United Kingdom) Vic Wilson	Cooper-Climax	3:16.5	+35.1

=== Race ===
Pos	No	Driver	Constructor	Laps	Time/Retired	Grid	Points
1	20	(United States) Phil Hill	Ferrari	50	2:21:09.2	1	8
2	18	(United States) Richie Ginther	Ferrari	50	+ 2:27.6	2	6
3	16	(Belgium) Willy Mairesse	Ferrari	49	+ 1 Lap	3	4
4	2	(Italy) Giulio Cabianca	Cooper-Castellotti	48	+ 2 Laps	4	3
5	22	(West Germany) Wolfgang von Trips	Ferrari	48	+ 2 Laps	6	2
6	26	(West Germany) Hans Herrmann	Porsche	47	+ 3 Laps	10	1
7	24	(West Germany) Edgar Barth	Porsche	47	+ 3 Laps	12	
8	12	(Italy) Piero Drogo	Cooper-Climax	45	+ 5 Laps	15	
9	10	(West Germany) Wolfgang Seidel	Cooper-Climax	44	+ 6 Laps	13	
10	28	(United States) Fred Gamble	Behra-Porsche-Porsche	41	+ 9 laps	14	
Ret	6	(United Kingdom) Brian Naylor	JBW-Maserati	41	Gearbox	7	
Ret	34	(Italy) Alfonso Thiele	Cooper-Maserati	32	Gearbox	9	
Ret	4	(Italy) Gino Munaron	Cooper-Castellotti	27	Engine	8	
Ret	36	(Italy) Giorgio Scarlatti	Cooper-Maserati	26	Engine	5	
Ret	30	(United Kingdom) Vic Wilson	Cooper-Climax	23	Engine	16	
Ret	8	(United Kingdom) Arthur Owen	Cooper-Climax	0	Accident	11	
DNS	14	(United Kingdom) Horace Gould	Maserati		Fuel system		

== Notes ==
- This was Phil Hill's first win and his first pole position in his Formula One World Championship career, and also the first pole position for an American driver (excluding the Indianapolis 500 races).
- It was the Formula One World Championship debut race for Italian drivers Alfonso Thiele and Piero Drogo, British drivers Arthur Owen and Vic Wilson, and for American driver Fred Gamble.
- This was Ferrari's third home win of an Italian Grand Prix. The Scuderia was already the most successful constructor and engine supplier at an Italian Grand Prix with three wins, four pole positions, five fastest laps and eighteen podiums in eleven Formula One World Championship Italian Grands Prix.

== Championship standings after the race ==
Drivers' Championship standings

	Pos	Driver	Points
	1	(Australia) Jack Brabham	40
	2	(New Zealand) Bruce McLaren	33
6	3	(United States) Phil Hill	15
1	4	(United Kingdom) Innes Ireland	12
1	5	(United Kingdom) Stirling Moss	11

Constructors' Championship standings

Pos	Constructor	Points
1	(United Kingdom) Cooper-Climax	48 (54)
2	(United Kingdom) Lotus-Climax	28 (29)
3	(Italy) Ferrari	26 (27)
4	(United Kingdom) BRM	6
5	(United Kingdom) Cooper-Maserati	3

- Notes: Only the top five positions are included for both sets of standings. Only the best 6 results counted towards each Championship. Numbers without parentheses are Championship points; numbers in parentheses are total points scored.

Previous race: 1960 Portuguese Grand Prix	FIA Formula One World Championship; 1960 season	Next race: 1960 United States Grand Prix
Previous race: 1959 Italian Grand Prix	Italian Grand Prix	Next race: 1961 Italian Grand Prix
Previous race: 1959 French Grand Prix	European Grand Prix (Designated European Grand Prix)	Next race: 1961 German Grand Prix
