= 1960 British Grand Prix =

← Previous race	Next race →
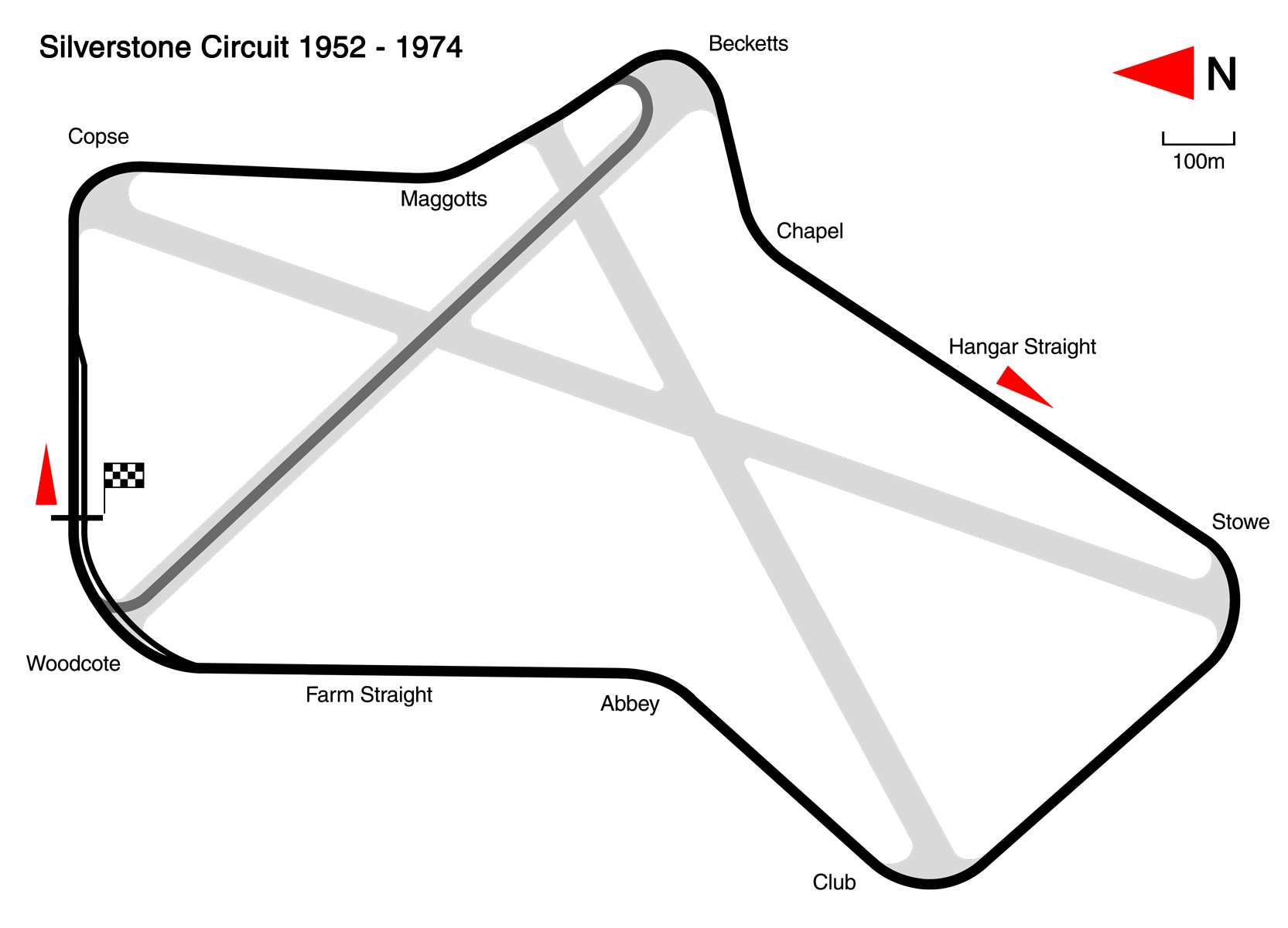

Race details
- Date: 16 July 1960
- Official name: 13th RAC British Grand Prix
- Location: Silverstone Circuit, Northants., England
- Course: Permanent road course
- Course length: 4.711 km (2.927 miles)
- Distance: 77 laps, 362.75 km (225.40 miles)
- Weather: Dry, overcast.

Pole position
Driver	(Australia) Jack Brabham	Cooper-Climax
- Time: 1:34.6

Fastest lap
Driver	(United Kingdom) Graham Hill	BRM
- Time: 1:34.4 on lap 56

Podium
First	(Australia) Jack Brabham	Cooper-Climax
Second	(United Kingdom) John Surtees	Lotus-Climax
Third	(United Kingdom) Innes Ireland	Lotus-Climax

The 1960 British Grand Prix was a Formula One motor race held at the Silverstone Circuit, Northamptonshire, England, on 16 July 1960. It was race 7 of 10 in the 1960 World Championship of Drivers and race 6 of 9 in the 1960 International Cup for Formula One Manufacturers. The race was won by reigning World Champion Jack Brabham and Innes Ireland finished in third place. Between the two, multiple motorcycle Grand Prix World Champion John Surtees (in only his second ever Formula One Grand Prix) took second place.

== Classification ==
=== Qualifying ===
Pos	No	Driver	Constructor	Time	Gap
1	1	(Australia) Jack Brabham	Cooper-Climax	1:34.6	—
2	4	(United Kingdom) Graham Hill	BRM	1:35.6	+1.0
3	2	(New Zealand) Bruce McLaren	Cooper-Climax	1:36.0	+1.4
4	6	(Sweden) Jo Bonnier	BRM	1:36.2	+1.6
5	7	(United Kingdom) Innes Ireland	Lotus-Climax	1:36.2	+1.6
6	5	(United States) Dan Gurney	BRM	1:36.6	+2.0
7	11	(Germany) Wolfgang von Trips	Ferrari	1:37.0	+2.4
8	8	(United Kingdom) Jim Clark	Lotus-Climax	1:37.0	+2.4
9	12	(United Kingdom) Tony Brooks	Cooper-Climax	1:37.6	+3.0
10	10	(United States) Phil Hill	Ferrari	1:37.8	+3.2
11	9	(United Kingdom) John Surtees	Lotus-Climax	1:38.6	+4.0
12	14	(Belgium) Olivier Gendebien	Cooper-Climax	1:39.2	+4.6
13	18	(United Kingdom) Roy Salvadori	Aston Martin	1:39.4	+4.8
14	16	(United States) Masten Gregory	Cooper-Maserati	1:39.8	+5.2
15	23	(United Kingdom) Jack Fairman	Cooper-Climax	1:39.8	+5.2
16	15	(United Kingdom) Henry Taylor	Cooper-Climax	1:40.0	+5.4
17	24	(Belgium) Lucien Bianchi	Cooper-Climax	1:40.2	+5.6
18	25	(United Kingdom) Brian Naylor	JBW-Maserati	1:41.2	+6.6
19	3	(United States) Chuck Daigh	Cooper-Climax	1:42.4	+7.8
20	17	(United Kingdom) Ian Burgess	Cooper-Maserati	1:42.6	+8.0
21	19	(France) Maurice Trintignant	Aston Martin	1:43.8	+9.2
22	22	(United Kingdom) Keith Greene	Cooper-Maserati	1:45.8	+11.2
23	3	(United States) Lance Reventlow	Cooper-Climax	1:46.4	+11.8
24	26	(United Kingdom) David Piper	Lotus-Climax	2:05.6	+31.0
25	21	(Italy) Gino Munaron	Cooper-Castellotti		

=== Race ===
Pos	No	Driver	Constructor	Laps	Time/Retired	Grid	Points
1	1	(Australia) Jack Brabham	Cooper-Climax	77	2:04:24.3	1	8
2	9	(United Kingdom) John Surtees	Lotus-Climax	77	+ 49.6	11	6
3	7	(United Kingdom) Innes Ireland	Lotus-Climax	77	+ 1:29.6	5	4
4	2	(New Zealand) Bruce McLaren	Cooper-Climax	76	+ 1 Lap	3	3
5	12	(United Kingdom) Tony Brooks	Cooper-Climax	76	+ 1 Lap	9	2
6	11	(Germany) Wolfgang von Trips	Ferrari	75	+ 2 Laps	7	1
7	10	(United States) Phil Hill	Ferrari	75	+ 2 Laps	10	
8	15	(United Kingdom) Henry Taylor	Cooper-Climax	74	+ 3 Laps	16	
9	14	(Belgium) Olivier Gendebien	Cooper-Climax	74	+ 3 Laps	12	
10	5	(United States) Dan Gurney	BRM	74	+ 3 Laps	6	
11	19	(France) Maurice Trintignant	Aston Martin	72	+ 5 Laps	21	
12	26	(United Kingdom) David Piper	Lotus-Climax	72	+ 5 Laps	23	
13	25	(United Kingdom) Brian Naylor	JBW-Maserati	72	+ 5 Laps	18	
14	16	(United States) Masten Gregory	Cooper-Maserati	71	+ 6 laps	14	
15	21	(Italy) Gino Munaron	Cooper-Castellotti	70	+ 7 Laps	24	
16	8	(United Kingdom) Jim Clark	Lotus-Climax	70	+ 7 Laps	8	
Ret	4	(United Kingdom) Graham Hill	BRM	71	Brakes	2	
Ret	24	(Belgium) Lucien Bianchi	Cooper-Climax	62	Electrical	17	
Ret	6	(Sweden) Jo Bonnier	BRM	59	Suspension	4	
Ret	3	(United States) Chuck Daigh	Cooper-Climax	58	Overheating	19	
Ret	17	(United Kingdom) Ian Burgess	Cooper-Maserati	58	Engine	20	
Ret	18	(United Kingdom) Roy Salvadori	Aston Martin	46	Steering	13	
Ret	23	(United Kingdom) Jack Fairman	Cooper-Climax	46	Fuel Pump	15	
Ret	22	(United Kingdom) Keith Greene	Cooper-Maserati	12	Overheating	22	
PO*	3	(United States) Lance Reventlow	Cooper-Climax		Withdrawn		

* Lance Reventlow and Chuck Daigh were entered with the same vehicle following extensive damage to their Scarab cars at the preceding French Grand Prix. Daigh proved the faster during practice and so Reventlow was withdrawn.

== Championship standings after the race ==
Drivers' Championship standings

	Pos	Driver	Points
	1	(Australia) Jack Brabham	32
	2	(New Zealand) Bruce McLaren	27
	3	(United Kingdom) Stirling Moss	11
2	4	(United Kingdom) Innes Ireland	11
1	5	(Belgium) Olivier Gendebien	10

Constructors' Championship standings

Pos	Constructor	Points
1	(United Kingdom) Cooper-Climax	46
2	(United Kingdom) Lotus-Climax	25
3	(Italy) Ferrari	16
4	(United Kingdom) BRM	6
5	(United Kingdom) Cooper-Maserati	3

- Notes: Only the top five positions are included for both sets of standings.

Previous race: 1960 French Grand Prix	FIA Formula One World Championship; 1960 season	Next race: 1960 Portuguese Grand Prix
Previous race: 1959 British Grand Prix	British Grand Prix	Next race: 1961 British Grand Prix
