= 1960 Portuguese Grand Prix =

← Previous race	Next race →

Race details
- Date: 14 August 1960
- Official name: IX Portuguese Grand Prix
- Location: Circuito da Boavista; Oporto (Porto), Portugal
- Course: Public road
- Course length: 7.4 km (4.625 miles)
- Distance: 55 laps, 407 km (254.375 miles)

Pole position
Driver	(United Kingdom) John Surtees	Lotus-Climax
- Time: 2:25.56

Fastest lap
Driver	(United Kingdom) John Surtees	Lotus-Climax
- Time: 2:27.53 on lap 33

Podium
First	(Australia) Jack Brabham	Cooper-Climax
Second	(New Zealand) Bruce McLaren	Cooper-Climax
Third	(United Kingdom) Jim Clark	Lotus-Climax

The 1960 Portuguese Grand Prix was a Formula One motor race held at Circuito da Boavista, Oporto on 14 August 1960. It was race 8 of 10 in the 1960 World Championship of Drivers and race 7 of 9 in the 1960 International Cup for Formula One Manufacturers.

Scottish racing legend Jim Clark scored his first ever Formula One podium at this race.

John Surtees achieved his first pole position at this race.

Jack Brabham, with his first-place finish, cinched the 1960 World Drivers' Championship on the 8th round of 10.

== Classification ==
=== Qualifying ===
Pos	No	Driver	Constructor	Time	Gap
1	18	(United Kingdom) John Surtees	Lotus-Climax	2:25.56	—
2	24	(United States) Dan Gurney	BRM	2:25.63	+0.07
3	2	(Australia) Jack Brabham	Cooper-Climax	2:26.05	+0.49
4	12	(United Kingdom) Stirling Moss	Lotus-Climax	2:26.19	+0.63
5	22	(United Kingdom) Graham Hill	BRM	2:27.11	+1.55
6	4	(New Zealand) Bruce McLaren	Cooper-Climax	2:27.44	+1.88
7	16	(United Kingdom) Innes Ireland	Lotus-Climax	2:27.52	+1.96
8	14	(United Kingdom) Jim Clark	Lotus-Climax	2:28.36	+2.80
9	28	(Germany) Wolfgang von Trips	Ferrari	2:28.40	+2.84
10	26	(United States) Phil Hill	Ferrari	2:28.42	+2.86
11	30	(United States) Masten Gregory	Cooper-Maserati	2:29.16	+3.60
12	6	(United Kingdom) Tony Brooks	Cooper-Climax	2:32.12	+6.56
13	20	(Sweden) Jo Bonnier	BRM	2:33.34	+7.78
14	8	(Belgium) Olivier Gendebien	Cooper-Climax	2:33.73	+8.17
15	32	(Portugal) Mário de Araújo Cabral	Cooper-Maserati	2:33.85	+8.29

=== Race ===
Pos	No	Driver	Constructor	Laps	Time/Retired	Grid	Points
1	2	(Australia) Jack Brabham	Cooper-Climax	55	2:19:00.03	3	8
2	4	(New Zealand) Bruce McLaren	Cooper-Climax	55	+ 57.97	6	6
3	14	(United Kingdom) Jim Clark	Lotus-Climax	55	+ 1:53.23	8	4
4	28	(Germany) Wolfgang von Trips	Ferrari	55	+ 1:58.81	9	3
5	6	(United Kingdom) Tony Brooks	Cooper-Climax	49	+ 6 Laps	12	2
6	16	(United Kingdom) Innes Ireland	Lotus-Climax	48	+ 7 Laps	7	1
7	8	(Belgium) Olivier Gendebien	Cooper-Climax	46	+ 9 Laps	14	
DSQ	12	(United Kingdom) Stirling Moss	Lotus-Climax	51	Disqualified	4	
Ret	32	(Portugal) Mário de Araújo Cabral	Cooper-Maserati	38	Accident	15	
Ret	18	(United Kingdom) John Surtees	Lotus-Climax	37	Radiator	1	
Ret	26	(United States) Phil Hill	Ferrari	30	Accident	10	
Ret	24	(United States) Dan Gurney	BRM	25	Engine	2	
Ret	30	(United States) Masten Gregory	Cooper-Maserati	21	Gearbox	11	
Ret	22	(United Kingdom) Graham Hill	BRM	9	Gearbox	5	
Ret	20	(Sweden) Jo Bonnier	BRM	6	Engine	13	
DNS	10	(United Kingdom) Henry Taylor	Cooper-Climax		Accident		

== Notes ==
- This was the second win of a Portuguese Grand Prix for a Cooper; a new record. Likewise, it was a second Portuguese Grand Prix win for a Coventry Climax-powered car, also a new record.

== Championship standings after the race ==
Drivers' Championship standings

	Pos	Driver	Points
	1	(Australia) Jack Brabham	40
	2	(New Zealand) Bruce McLaren	33
1	3	(United Kingdom) Innes Ireland	12
1	4	(United Kingdom) Stirling Moss	11
	5	(Belgium) Olivier Gendebien	10

Constructors' Championship standings

Pos	Constructor	Points
1	(United Kingdom) Cooper-Climax	48 (54)
2	(United Kingdom) Lotus-Climax	28 (29)
3	(Italy) Ferrari	19
4	(United Kingdom) BRM	6
5	(United Kingdom) Cooper-Maserati	3

- Notes: Only the top five positions are included for both sets of standings. Only the best 6 results counted towards each Championship. Numbers without parentheses are Championship points; numbers in parentheses are total points scored.

Previous race: 1960 British Grand Prix	FIA Formula One World Championship; 1960 season	Next race: 1960 Italian Grand Prix
Previous race: 1959 Portuguese Grand Prix	Portuguese Grand Prix	Next race: 1964 Portuguese Grand Prix
