= 1959 Italian Grand Prix =

| ← Previous race | Next race → |
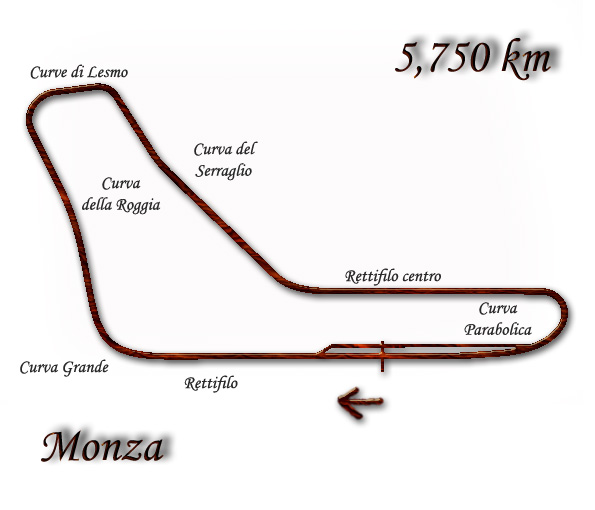

Race details
- Date: 13 September 1959
- Official name: XXX Gran Premio d'Italia
- Location: Autodromo Nazionale di Monza; Monza, Italy
- Course: Permanent racing facility
- Course length: 5.750 km (3.573 miles)
- Distance: 72 laps, 414.000 km (257.256 miles)
- Weather: Dry and sunny

Pole position
| Driver | (United Kingdom) Stirling Moss | Cooper-Climax |
- Time: 1:39.7

Fastest lap
| Driver | (United States) Phil Hill | Ferrari |
- Time: 1:40.4

Podium
| First | (United Kingdom) Stirling Moss | Cooper-Climax |
| Second | (United States) Phil Hill | Ferrari |
| Third | (Australia) Jack Brabham | Cooper-Climax |

The 1959 Italian Grand Prix was a Formula One motor race held at Monza on 13 September 1959. It was race 8 of 9 in the 1959 World Championship of Drivers and race 7 of 8 in the 1959 International Cup for Formula One Manufacturers. It was the 29th Italian Grand Prix and the 24th to be held at Monza. The race was held over 72 laps of the five-kilometre circuit for a total race distance of 414 kilometres.

The race was won by British driver Stirling Moss driving a Cooper T51 for the privateer Rob Walker Racing Team. Moss won by 46 seconds over American driver Phil Hill driving a Ferrari Dino 246 for Scuderia Ferrari. Championship points leader Australian Jack Brabham finished third in works entered Cooper T51, expanding his points lead, but not sufficiently to prevent a championship showdown with Moss and Ferrari driver Tony Brooks at the United States Grand Prix.

== Race report ==
This race was won on the weight of the cars, with Stirling Moss and team manager Rob Walker gambling on running the whole race without a tyre change in the little lightweight Cooper – although they substituted knock-on wheels for bolt-ons in case a pit stop was necessary. Stirling drove a careful race, relying on the Ferrari crew needing to pit. Tony Brooks made a good start but a piston failure eliminated him on the first lap. Graham Hill and then Dan Gurney led, but lost their advantages through clumsy pit-stop action. Moss continued to win at an average speed of 124 mph, a track record. Phil Hill was second for Ferrari on their home track, ahead of a Ferrari 4–5–6 in the order Gurney, Cliff Allison and Olivier Gendebien.

Moss's win closed the championship gap to only 5.5 points behind Jack Brabham with Brooks eight points behind Brabham. The combined efforts of Brabham, Moss, Maurice Trintignant, Bruce McLaren and Masten Gregory secured the Constructors' Championship for the Cooper Car Company.

== Classification ==
=== Qualifying ===
| Pos | No | Driver | Constructor | Time | Gap |
|---|---|---|---|---|---|
| 1 | 14 | (United Kingdom) Stirling Moss | Cooper-Climax | 1:39.7 | — |
| 2 | 30 | (United Kingdom) Tony Brooks | Ferrari | 1:39.8 | +0.1 |
| 3 | 12 | (Australia) Jack Brabham | Cooper-Climax | 1:40.2 | +0.5 |
| 4 | 36 | (United States) Dan Gurney | Ferrari | 1:40.8 | +1.1 |
| 5 | 32 | (United States) Phil Hill | Ferrari | 1:41.2 | +1.5 |
| 6 | 38 | (Belgium) Olivier Gendebien | Ferrari | 1:41.4 | +1.7 |
| 7 | 2 | (United States) Harry Schell | BRM | 1:41.6 | +1.9 |
| 8 | 34 | (United Kingdom) Cliff Allison | Ferrari | 1:41.8 | +2.1 |
| 9 | 8 | (New Zealand) Bruce McLaren | Cooper-Climax | 1:42.0 | +2.3 |
| 10 | 18 | (United Kingdom) Graham Hill | Lotus-Climax | 1:42.9 | +3.2 |
| 11 | 6 | (Sweden) Jo Bonnier | BRM | 1:43.1 | +3.4 |
| 12 | 10 | (Italy) Giorgio Scarlatti | Cooper-Climax | 1:43.3 | +3.6 |
| 13 | 16 | (France) Maurice Trintignant | Cooper-Climax | 1:43.4 | +3.7 |
| 14 | 20 | (United Kingdom) Innes Ireland | Lotus-Climax | 1:43.5 | +3.8 |
| 15 | 4 | (United Kingdom) Ron Flockhart | BRM | 1:43.6 | +3.9 |
| 16 | 42 | (United Kingdom) Ian Burgess | Cooper-Maserati | 1:44.6 | +4.9 |
| 17 | 24 | (United Kingdom) Roy Salvadori | Aston Martin | 1:44.7 | +5.0 |
| 18 | 40 | (United Kingdom) Colin Davis | Cooper-Maserati | 1:44.9 | +5.2 |
| 19 | 26 | (United States) Carroll Shelby | Aston Martin | 1:46.4 | +6.7 |
| 20 | 22 | (United Kingdom) Jack Fairman | Cooper-Maserati | 1:49.4 | +9.7 |
| 21 | 28 | (Italy) Giulio Cabianca | Maserati | 1:51.5 | +11.8 |

=== Race ===
| Pos | No | Driver | Constructor | Laps | Time/Retired | Grid | Points |
|---|---|---|---|---|---|---|---|
| 1 | 14 | (United Kingdom) Stirling Moss | Cooper-Climax | 72 | 2:04:05.4 | 1 | 8 |
| 2 | 32 | (United States) Phil Hill | Ferrari | 72 | + 46.7 | 5 | 7^{1} |
| 3 | 12 | (Australia) Jack Brabham | Cooper-Climax | 72 | + 1:12.5 | 3 | 4 |
| 4 | 36 | (United States) Dan Gurney | Ferrari | 72 | + 1:19.6 | 4 | 3 |
| 5 | 34 | (United Kingdom) Cliff Allison | Ferrari | 71 | + 1 Lap | 8 | 2 |
| 6 | 38 | (Belgium) Olivier Gendebien | Ferrari | 71 | + 1 Lap | 6 | |
| 7 | 2 | (United States) Harry Schell | BRM | 70 | + 2 Laps | 7 | |
| 8 | 6 | (Sweden) Jo Bonnier | BRM | 70 | + 2 Laps | 11 | |
| 9 | 16 | (France) Maurice Trintignant | Cooper-Climax | 70 | + 2 Laps | 13 | |
| 10 | 26 | (United States) Carroll Shelby | Aston Martin | 70 | + 2 Laps | 19 | |
| 11 | 40 | (United Kingdom) Colin Davis | Cooper-Maserati | 68 | + 4 Laps | 18 | |
| 12 | 10 | (Italy) Giorgio Scarlatti | Cooper-Climax | 68 | + 4 Laps | 12 | |
| 13 | 4 | (United Kingdom) Ron Flockhart | BRM | 67 | + 5 Laps | 15 | |
| 14 | 42 | (United Kingdom) Ian Burgess | Cooper-Maserati | 67 | + 5 Laps | 16 | |
| 15 | 28 | (Italy) Giulio Cabianca | Maserati | 64 | + 8 Laps | 21 | |
| Ret | 24 | (United Kingdom) Roy Salvadori | Aston Martin | 44 | Engine | 17 | |
| Ret | 8 | (New Zealand) Bruce McLaren | Cooper-Climax | 22 | Engine | 9 | |
| Ret | 22 | (United Kingdom) Jack Fairman | Cooper-Maserati | 18 | Engine | 20 | |
| Ret | 20 | (United Kingdom) Innes Ireland | Lotus-Climax | 14 | Brakes | 14 | |
| Ret | 18 | (United Kingdom) Graham Hill | Lotus-Climax | 1 | Clutch | 10 | |
| Ret | 30 | (United Kingdom) Tony Brooks | Ferrari | 0 | Clutch | 2 | |

Notes

- ^1 – Includes 1 point for fastest lap

== Championship standings after the race ==
Drivers' Championship standings

| | Pos | Driver | Points |
|---|---|---|---|
| | 1 | (Australia) Jack Brabham | 31 |
| 1 | 2 | (United Kingdom) Stirling Moss | 25.5 |
| 1 | 3 | (United Kingdom) Tony Brooks | 23 |
| | 4 | (United States) Phil Hill | 20 |
| 3 | 5 | (United States) Dan Gurney | 13 |

Constructors' Championship standings

| Pos | Constructor | Points |
|---|---|---|
| 1 | (United Kingdom) Cooper-Climax | 38 (45) |
| 2 | (Italy) Ferrari | 32 (34) |
| 3 | (United Kingdom) BRM | 18 |
| 4 | (United Kingdom) Lotus-Climax | 3 |

- Notes: Only the top five positions are included for both sets of standings. Only the best 5 results counted towards each championship. Numbers without parentheses are championship points; numbers in parentheses are total points scored.

| Previous race: 1959 Portuguese Grand Prix | FIA Formula One World Championship; 1959 season | Next race: 1959 United States Grand Prix |
| Previous race: 1958 Italian Grand Prix | Italian Grand Prix | Next race: 1960 Italian Grand Prix |
