= Ferrari V6 F1 engine =

Dino 246 2.4 L V6 engine Dino 156 1.5 L V6 engine Tipo 228 2.4 L V6 engine

Overview
- Manufacturer: (Italy) Ferrari
- Production: 1958–1966

Layout
- Configuration: 65° V6
- Displacement: 1.5 L (1,476 cc); 2.4 L (2,417 cc)
- Cylinder bore: 73 mm (2.9 in); 85 mm (3.3 in)
- Piston stroke: 58.8 mm (2.3 in); 71 mm (2.8 in)
- Compression ratio: 9.8:1

Combustion
- Fuel system: Carburetor
- Fuel type: Gasoline
- Cooling system: Water-cooled

Output
- Power output: 185–295 hp (138–220 kW; 188–299 PS)
- Torque output: 102.5–187 lb⋅ft (139–254 N⋅m)

Dimensions
- Dry weight: 135 kg (298 lb)

Chronology
- Successor: Ferrari turbocharged V6 F1 engine (1981-1988)

Ferrari made four naturally-aspirated V6 racing engines designed for Formula One; between 1958 and 1966. The Formula One regulations for 1954–1960 limited naturally aspirated engines to 2500 cc, and for the 1958 season, there was a change from alcohol fuels to avgas. The 246 F1 used a 2,417.34 cc (2.4 L; 147.5 cu in) Dino V6 engine with a 65° angle between the cylinder banks. The power output was 280 PS (206 kW; 276 hp) at 8500 rpm. This was the first use of a V6 engine in a Formula One car, but otherwise the 246 F1 was a conventional front-engine design. The Ferrari 246 F1 was good enough to win a World Championship for Mike Hawthorn and a second place in the Constructors' Championship for Ferrari.

The Ferrari 246 F1 was not only the first V6-engined car to win a Formula One Grand Prix, the French Grand Prix at Reims in 1958, it was also the last front-engined car to win a Formula One Grand Prix. This occurred at the 1960 Italian Grand Prix at Monza, where the major British teams boycotted the race.

In 1959, to make full use of the allowed capacity regulations, Ferrari enlarged the bore of the Dino V6 engine of the 246 F1 car by 1 mm to 86 mm. This allowed the total displacement to rise to 2,474.54 cc (151 cu in). The resulting power output was now 295 PS (217 kW; 291 hp) at 8600 rpm. The new car also received disc brakes as standard and a five-speed gearbox. Only Tony Brooks raced this model but he was outpaced by the mid-engined British cars. He still won in the French and German Grands Prix.

In 1960, the Ferrari 246 designation was also used for the first mid-/rear-engined Ferrari, the 246 P Formula One car (using same Dino V6 engine of 2,417.34 cc (148 cu in)), and then again in 1966 for Ferrari's first three-litre era Formula One car.

Ferrari started the season with a 65-degree Dino engine, then replaced by a new engine with the V-angle increased to 120-degrees and designed by Carlo Chiti. A V-6 engine with 120-degree bank is smoother at producing power because every 120-degree rotation of engine crankshaft produces a power pulse. This change increased the power by 7 kW (10 hp). Bore and stroke were 73.0 mm × 58.8 mm (2.87 in × 2.31 in) with a displacement of 1,476.60 cc (90.108 cu in) and a claimed 140 kW (188 hp) at 9500 rpm. For 1962, a 24-valve version was planned with 147 kW (197 hp) at 10,000 rpm, but never appeared.

== 65° ==
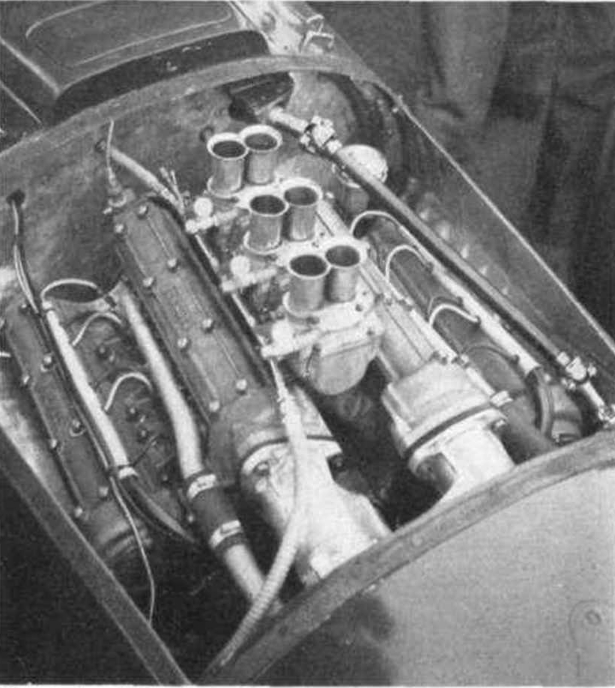
65° V6 in the 1957 Dino 156 F2 s/n 0011 on 28 April 1957.

Ferrari designers began work on the first Dino V6 engine in 1956 and the engine was running by the end of the year. The engine displaced 1,489 cc (1.5 L; 90.9 cu in). This engine was installed in the Dino 156 F2 car and was first raced in the Grand Prix of Naples in April 1957, where it finished in third place behind two Lancia-Ferrari V8 Formula One cars.

The result of the trio's creativity was the world's only 65° V6 engine. The extra 5° between cylinder banks gave Ferrari the straight intakes he wanted. As this engine was not a true V6 but had a separate crankpin for every connecting rod, the crankpins were offset by 55 degrees within every pair of cylinders. This ensured an even firing order for the complete engine as well as an even distance between firing pulses per cylinder bank. Thus the engine was as smooth running as a conventional 60-degree V6, but had greatly enhanced potential for the design of harmonically balanced exhaust manifolds, giving much better performance. Although the Dino V6 was discontinued with the introduction of the V8, the 65° design continues to this day: It reappeared on Ferrari's 1992 456 V12.

The 85 mm × 71 mm (3.35 in × 2.80 in) 2,417 cc (2.4 L; 147.5 cu in) engine used in the 246 S produced 280 PS (276 bhp; 206 kW) with dual overhead camshafts pushing two valves per cylinder. The rear mid-engine, rear-wheel-drive layout 1961 Ferrari 246 SP used this same engine, as did the 246 P F1.

== Applications ==
- Ferrari 246 F1
- Ferrari 246 P
- Ferrari 156 F1
- Ferrari 246 F1-66/158/246
