= Ferrari Dino 156 F2 =

Italian Formula 2 race car

Ferrari 156 F2
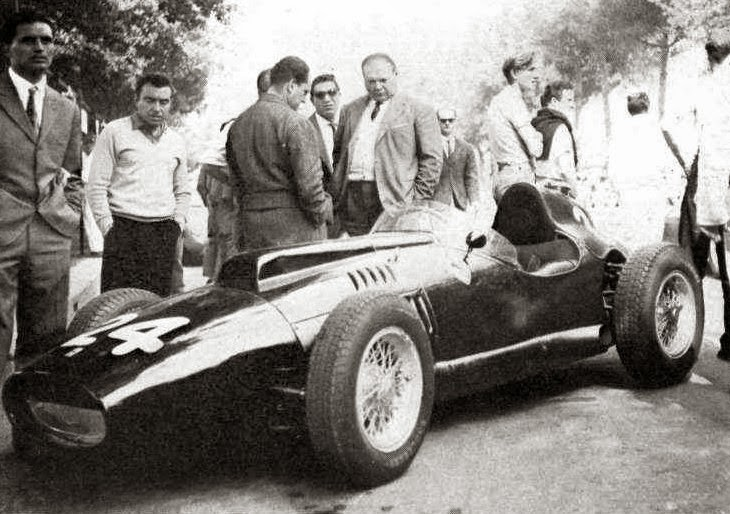
- 1957 Ferrari 156 F2
- Category: Formula Two
- Constructor: Ferrari
- Designer(s): Vittorio Jano (Technical Director); Carlo Chiti (Chief Designer)
- Predecessor: 801
- Successor: Dino 166 F2/156

Technical specifications
- Chassis: Tubular aluminium body on chassis composed of two main elliptic tubes and other small tubes to form a light, rigid structure
- Suspension (front): double wishbones, coil springs, telescopic dampers and anti-roll bar
- Suspension (rear): DeDion axle, transverse upper leaf spring, two longitudinal radius arms, Houdaille shock absorber lever dampers
- Engine: Dino, 1,489 cc (90.9 cu in), 65° V6, naturally aspirated front engine, longitudinally mounted
- Transmission: Ferrari Type 523 4-speed manual
- Weight: 512 kg (1,129 lb)
- Fuel: Shell
- Tyres: Dunlop

Competition history
- Notable entrants: Scuderia Ferrari; FISA; Scuderia Sant Ambroeus

The Ferrari Dino 156 F2 was an open-wheel Formula 2 race car, designed, developed, built, and entered into the competition by Italian racing team Scuderia Ferrari.

== Development history and technology ==
When it was foreseeable in 1957 that the Ferrari 801 would not bring the desired success - the concept of the car came from 1953, when Vittorio Jano developed the Lancia D50 - Ferrari devoted itself to the development of a new type of racing car. The Dino 156F2, named after Alfredo ("Dino"), the son of company founder Enzo Ferrari who died young, was a Formula 2 racing car and the first of this series. Alfredino had worked together with Jano on the design of a V6 engine that was used in the Dino 156 until his death. In 1957, the engine produced 180 hp at 1489 cm³. In 1958 Aviation fuel was prescribed as a fuel in Formula 1, the power could be increased to 190 hp.

The chassis was based on the blueprint of the 1955 Ferrari 555 Supersqualo, with coil springs at the front and a De Dion axle at the rear. The Dino 156 was a heavy car, but the powerful engine made up for the weight handicap. From the autumn of 1957, larger displacement engines were used, first the 2.1-liter engine, later the 2.5-liter engine. In 1958, a new tubular space frame was briefly experimented with, but the idea was abandoned in 1959.

== Technical data ==
Technical data	156 F2
Engine:	Front mounted 65° 6 cylinder V engine
Cylinder:	1489 cm³
Bore x stroke:	70 x 64.5 mm
Compression:	9.8:1
Max power at rpm:	180 hp at 9 000 rpm
Valve control:	Dual Overhead Camshafts per cylinder bank
Carburetor:	3 Weber 38 DCN
Gearbox:	4-speed manual
suspension front:	Double wishbones, coil springs, anti-roll bars
suspension rear:	De Dion axle, double longitudinal links, transverse leaf spring
Brakes:	Drum brakes
Chassis & body:	Fackverksframe with aluminum body
Wheelbase:	216 cm
Dry weight:	512 kg
Dry speed:	240 km/h

== Racing history ==
Basically, the 156F2 was the basis for the Ferrari Dino 246 F1, with which the Scuderia won the 1958 World Drivers' Championship. The car was rarely used in races. In 1957 the Dino 156F2 was seen in two races and Cliff Allison drove the car in the 1959 Monaco Grand Prix. Allison retired early after colliding with Bruce Halford and Wolfgang von Trips.
