= Ferrari 246 F1 =

Formula One racing car

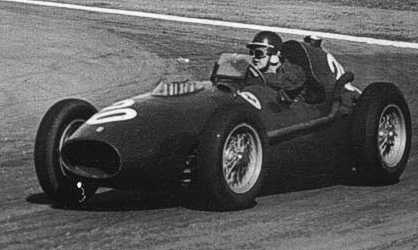
- Mike Hawthorn driving a 246 F1 at the 1958 Argentine Grand Prix
- Category: Formula One
- Constructor: Ferrari
- Designers: Vittorio Jano (Technical Director); Carlo Chiti (Chief Designer)
- Predecessor: 801, 156 F2
- Successor: 246 P, 156

Technical specifications
- Chassis: Tubular aluminium body on chassis composed of two main elliptic tubes and other small tubes to form a light, rigid structure
- Suspension (front): double wishbones, coil springs, telescopic dampers and anti-roll bar
- Suspension (rear): DeDion axle, transverse upper leaf spring, two longitudinal radius arms, Houdaille shock absorber lever dampers
- Engine: Dino, 2,417.33 cc (147.5 cu in), 65° V6, naturally aspirated front engine, longitudinally mounted
- Transmission: Ferrari Type 523 4-speed manual
- Weight: 560 kg (1,230 lb)
- Fuel: Shell
- Tyres: Dunlop

Competition history
- Notable entrants: Scuderia Ferrari; FISA; Scuderia Sant Ambroeus
- Notable drivers: (Italy) Luigi Musso (United Kingdom) Peter Collins (United Kingdom) Mike Hawthorn (West Germany) Wolfgang von Trips (Belgium) Olivier Gendebien (United States) Phil Hill (United Kingdom) Tony Brooks
- Debut: 1958 Argentine Grand Prix
Races	Wins	Poles
25	5	7
- Constructors' Championships: 0
- Drivers' Championships: 1

The Ferrari 246 F1 is a Ferrari racing car built for the Formula One World Championship of 1958.

== 246 F1 ==
The Formula One regulations for 1954–1960 limited naturally aspirated engines to 2500 cc and for the 1958 season there was a change from alcohol fuels to avgas. The 246 F1 used a 2,417.34 cc (2.4 L; 147.5 cu in) Dino V6 engine with a 65° angle between the cylinder banks. The power output was 280 PS (206 kW; 276 hp) at 8500 rpm. Bore X Stroke: 85 mm × 71 mm (3.35 in × 2.80 in) This was the first use of a V6 engine in a Formula One car, but otherwise the 246 F1 was a conventional front-engine design. The Ferrari 246 F1 was good enough to win a World Championship for Mike Hawthorn and a second place in the Constructors' Championship for Ferrari.

The Ferrari 246 F1 was not only the first V6-engined car to win a Formula One Grand Prix, the French Grand Prix at Reims in 1958, it was also the last front-engined car to win a Formula One Grand Prix. This occurred at the 1960 Italian Grand Prix at Monza, where the major British teams boycotted the race.

In 1960, the Ferrari 246 designation was also used for the first mid-/rear-engined Ferrari, the 246 P Formula One car (using same Dino V6 engine of 2,417.34 cc), and then again in 1966 for Ferrari's first three-litre era Formula One car.

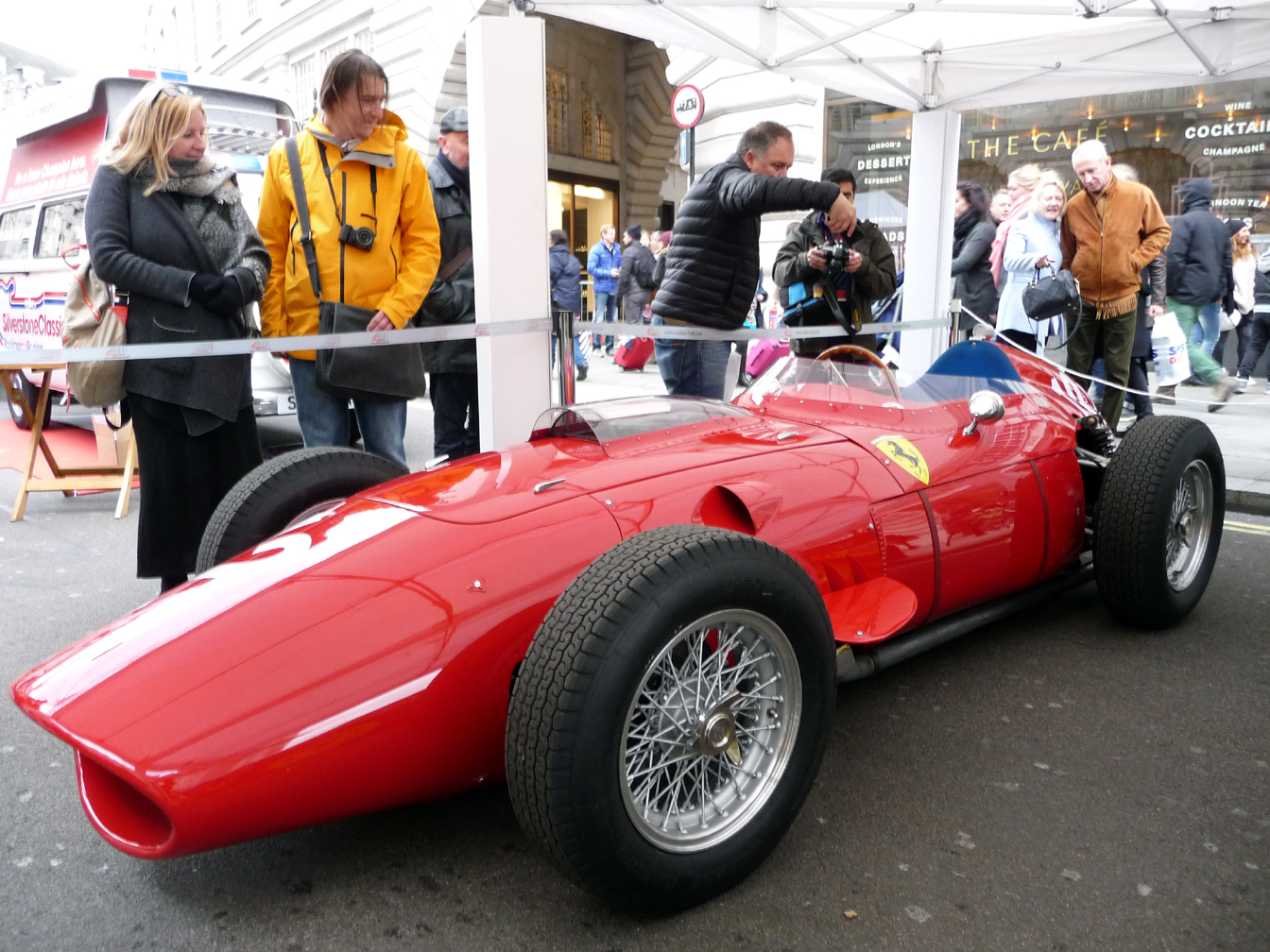
A 246 F1 in exhibition in Regent Street, in 2016

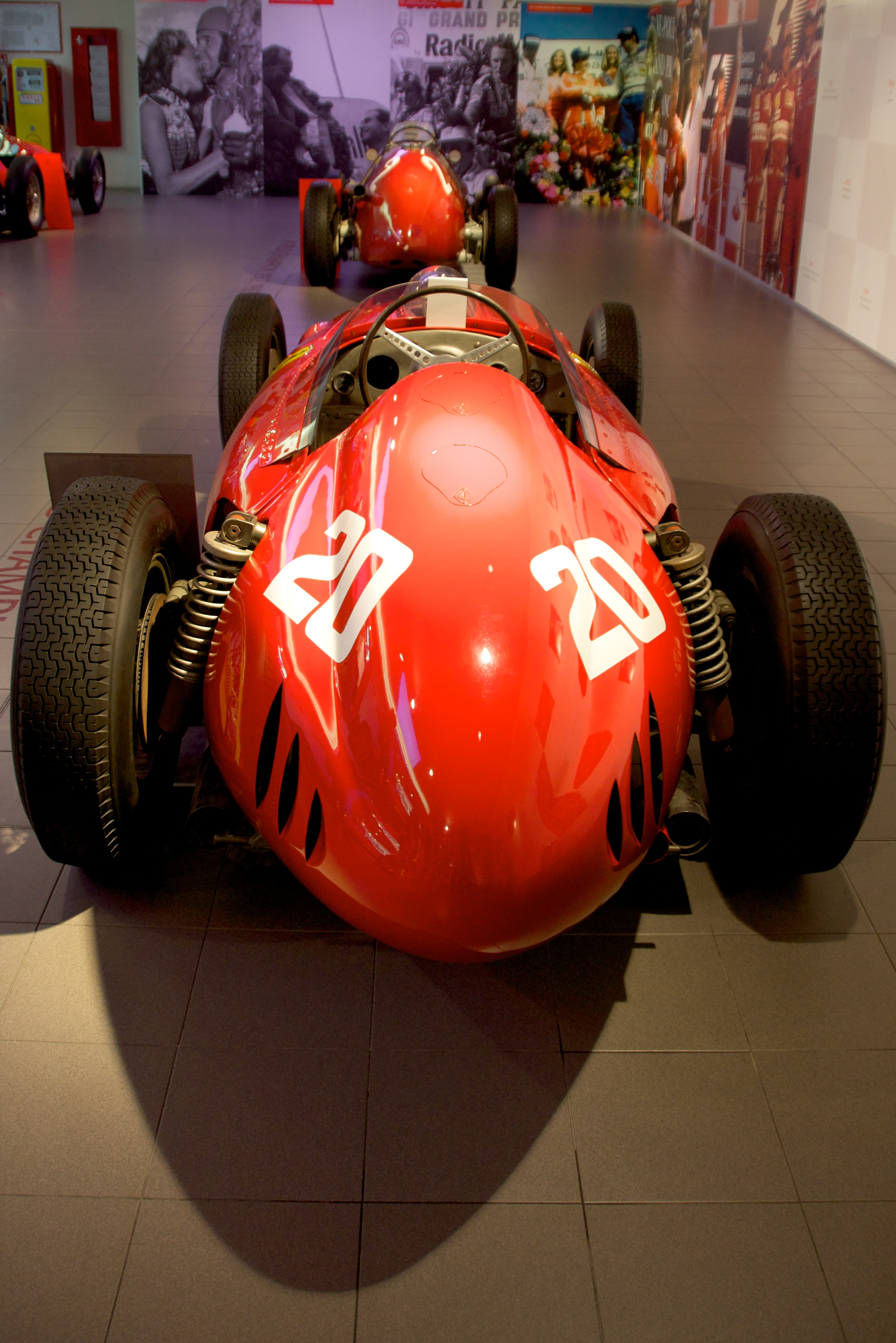
Rear view of the 246 F1

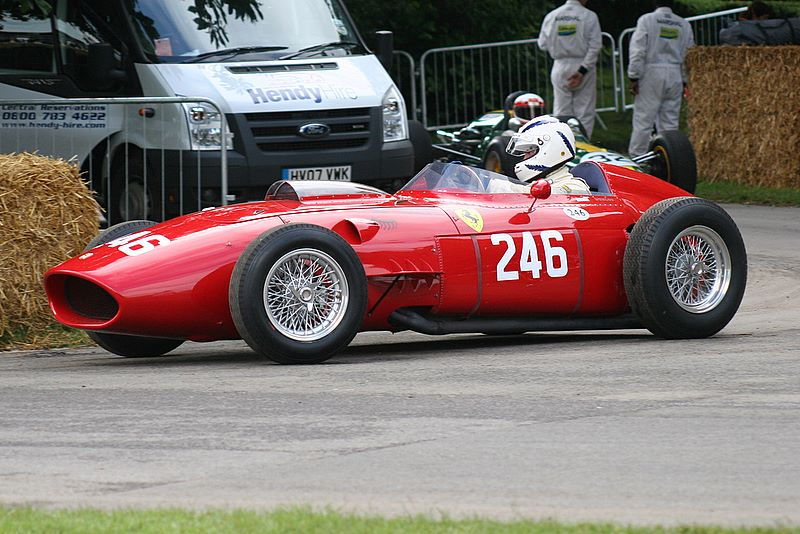
A 246 F1 in 2007

== 256 F1 ==
In 1959, to make a full use of the allowed capacity regulations, Ferrari enlarged the bore of the Dino V6 engine of the 246 F1 car by 1 mm to 86 mm. This allowed the total displacement to rise to 2474.54 cc. The resulting power output was now 295 PS (217 kW; 291 hp) at 8600 rpm. The new car also received disc brakes as standard and a five-speed gearbox. Only Tony Brooks raced this model but he was outpaced by the mid-engined British cars. He still won in the French and German Grands Prix.

== Technical data ==
Technical data	156 F2	246 F1	256 F1
Engine:	Front mounted 65° 6 cylinder V engine
Cylinder:	1489 cm^{3}	2417 cm^{3}	2475 cm^{3}
Bore x stroke:	70 x 64.5 mm	85 x 71 mm	86 x 71 mm
Compression:	9.8:1	10.0:1
Max power at rpm:	180 hp at 9 000 rpm	280 hp at 8 500 rpm	295 hp at 8 600 rpm
Valve control:	Dual Overhead Camshafts per cylinder bank
Carburetor:	3 Weber 38 DCN	3 Weber 42 DCN	3 Weber 45 DCN
Gearbox:	4-speed manual		5-speed manual
suspension front:	Double wishbones, coil springs, anti-roll bars
suspension rear:	De Dion axle, double longitudinal links, transverse leaf spring		De Dion axle, double longitudinal links, coil springs
Brakes:	Drum brakes		Disc brakes
Chassis & body:	Tubular space frame with aluminium body
Wheelbase:	216 cm		222 cm
Dry weight:		560 kg
Maximum speed:	240 km/h	280 km/h

== Formula One World Championship results ==
(key)

Year	Engine	Tyres	Driver	1	2	3	4	5	6	7	8	9	10	11	Points	WCC
1958	2.4 V6	E		ARG	MON	NED	500	BEL	FRA	GBR	GER	POR	ITA	MOR	40^{1} (57)	2nd
1958	2.4 V6	E	(United Kingdom) Peter Collins		3	Ret		Ret	5	1	Ret				40^{1} (57)	2nd
1958	2.4 V6	E	(Belgium) Olivier Gendebien										Ret	Ret	40^{1} (57)	2nd
1958	2.4 V6	E	(United Kingdom) Mike Hawthorn	3	Ret^{F}	5		2^{P}^{F}	1^{P}^{F}	2^{F}	Ret^{P}	2^{F}	2	2^{P}	40^{1} (57)	2nd
1958	2.4 V6	E	(Italy) Luigi Musso		2	7		Ret	Ret						40^{1} (57)	2nd
1958	2.4 V6	E	(Germany) Wolfgang von Trips						3	Ret	4	5	Ret		40^{1} (57)	2nd
1958	2.4 V6	E	(United States) Phil Hill									DNA	3^{F}	3	40^{1} (57)	2nd
1959	2.4 V6	D		MON	500	NED	FRA	GBR	GER	POR	ITA	USA			32 (38)	2nd
1959	2.4 V6	D	(United Kingdom) Cliff Allison			9			Ret		5	Ret			32 (38)	2nd
1959	2.4 V6	D	(France) Jean Behra	Ret											32 (38)	2nd
1959	2.4 V6	D	(United Kingdom) Tony Brooks	2		Ret	1^{P}		1^{P}^{F}	9	Ret	3			32 (38)	2nd
1959	2.4 V6	D	(Belgium) Olivier Gendebien				4								32 (38)	2nd
1959	2.4 V6	D	(United States) Dan Gurney				Ret		2	3	4				32 (38)	2nd
1959	2.4 V6	D	(United States) Phil Hill	4		6	2		3	Ret	2^{F}	Ret			32 (38)	2nd
1959	2.4 V6	D	(Germany) Wolfgang von Trips									6			32 (38)	2nd
1960	2.4 V6	D		ARG	MON	500	NED	BEL	FRA	GBR	POR	ITA	USA		26 (27)	3rd
1960	2.4 V6	D	(United Kingdom) Cliff Allison	2	DNQ										26 (27)	3rd
1960	2.4 V6	D	(United States) Richie Ginther				6					2			26 (27)	3rd
1960	2.4 V6	D	(Argentina) José Froilán González	10											26 (27)	3rd
1960	2.4 V6	D	(United States) Phil Hill	8	3		Ret	4^{F}	12	7	Ret	1^{P}^{F}			26 (27)	3rd
1960	2.4 V6	D	(Belgium) Willy Mairesse					Ret	Ret			3			26 (27)	3rd
1960	2.4 V6	D	(Germany) Wolfgang von Trips	5	8		5	Ret	11	6	4				26 (27)	3rd

^{1}Includes 6 points scored by Dino 156 F2.
