= Phil Hill =

American racing driver (1927–2008)

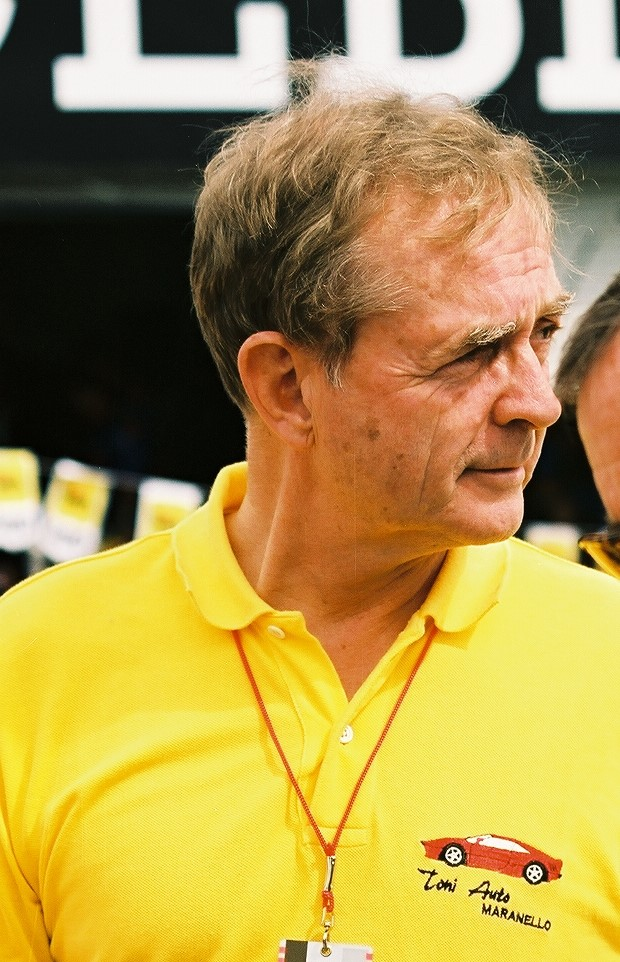
- Hill at the 1991 United States Grand Prix
- Born: Philip Toll Hill Jr. April 20, 1927; Miami, Florida, U.S.
- Died: August 28, 2008 (aged 81); Monterey, California, U.S.
- Spouse: Alma Varanowski (m. 1971)
- Children: 3, including Derek

Formula One World Championship career
- Nationality: (United States) American
- Active years: 1958–1964, 1966
- Team(s): Bonnier, Ferrari, BRP, Porsche, ATS, Filipinetti, Cooper, privateer Lotus, privateer McLaren, Eagle
- Entries: 52 (49 starts)
- Championships: 1 (1961)
- Wins: 3
- Podiums: 16
- Career points: 94 (98) (Note: Up until 1990, not all points scored by a driver contributed to their final World Championship tally (see list of points scoring systems for more information). Numbers without parentheses are Championship points; numbers in parentheses are total points scored.)
- Pole positions: 6
- Fastest laps: 6
- First entry: 1958 French Grand Prix
- First win: 1960 Italian Grand Prix
- Last win: 1961 Italian Grand Prix
- Last entry: 1966 Italian Grand Prix

24 Hours of Le Mans career
- Years: 1953, 1955–1967
- Teams: OSCA, Ferrari, Aston Martin, Ford, Shelby American, Chaparral
- Best finish: 1st (1958, 1961, 1962)
- Class wins: 3 (1958, 1961, 1962)

Philip Toll Hill Jr. (April 20, 1927 – August 28, 2008) was an American racing driver, who competed in Formula One from 1958 to 1966. Hill won the Formula One World Drivers' Championship in 1961 with Ferrari, and won three Grands Prix across eight seasons. In endurance racing, Hill was a three-time winner of both the 24 Hours of Le Mans and the 12 Hours of Sebring, all with Ferrari. Upon winning the 24 Hours of Daytona in 1964 with NART, Hill became the first driver to complete the Triple Crown of endurance racing. (Note: The Triple Crown of endurance racing is an unofficial achievement of winning the 24 Hours of Le Mans, the 24 Hours of Daytona, and the 12 Hours of Sebring.)

Hill was one of two American drivers to win the World Drivers' Championship alongside Mario Andretti, and the only one who was born in the United States. Hill was described as a "thoughtful, gentle man" and once said, "I'm in the wrong business. I don't want to beat anybody, I don't want to be the big hero. I'm a peace-loving man, basically."

== Career ==
Born April 20, 1927, in Miami, Florida, Hill was raised in Santa Monica, California, where he lived until his death. He studied business administration at the University of Southern California from 1945 to 1947, where he was a member of Kappa Sigma fraternity. He left early to pursue auto racing, working as a mechanic on other drivers' cars. He began racing cars at an early age, going to England as a Jaguar trainee in 1949 and signing with Enzo Ferrari's team in 1956. He made his debut in the French Grand Prix at Reims, France, in 1958 driving a Maserati. That same year, paired with Belgian teammate Olivier Gendebien, Hill became the first American-born winner of the 24 Hours of Le Mans with Hill driving most of the night in horrific rainy conditions. He and Gendebien would go on to win the endurance race again in 1961 and 1962.

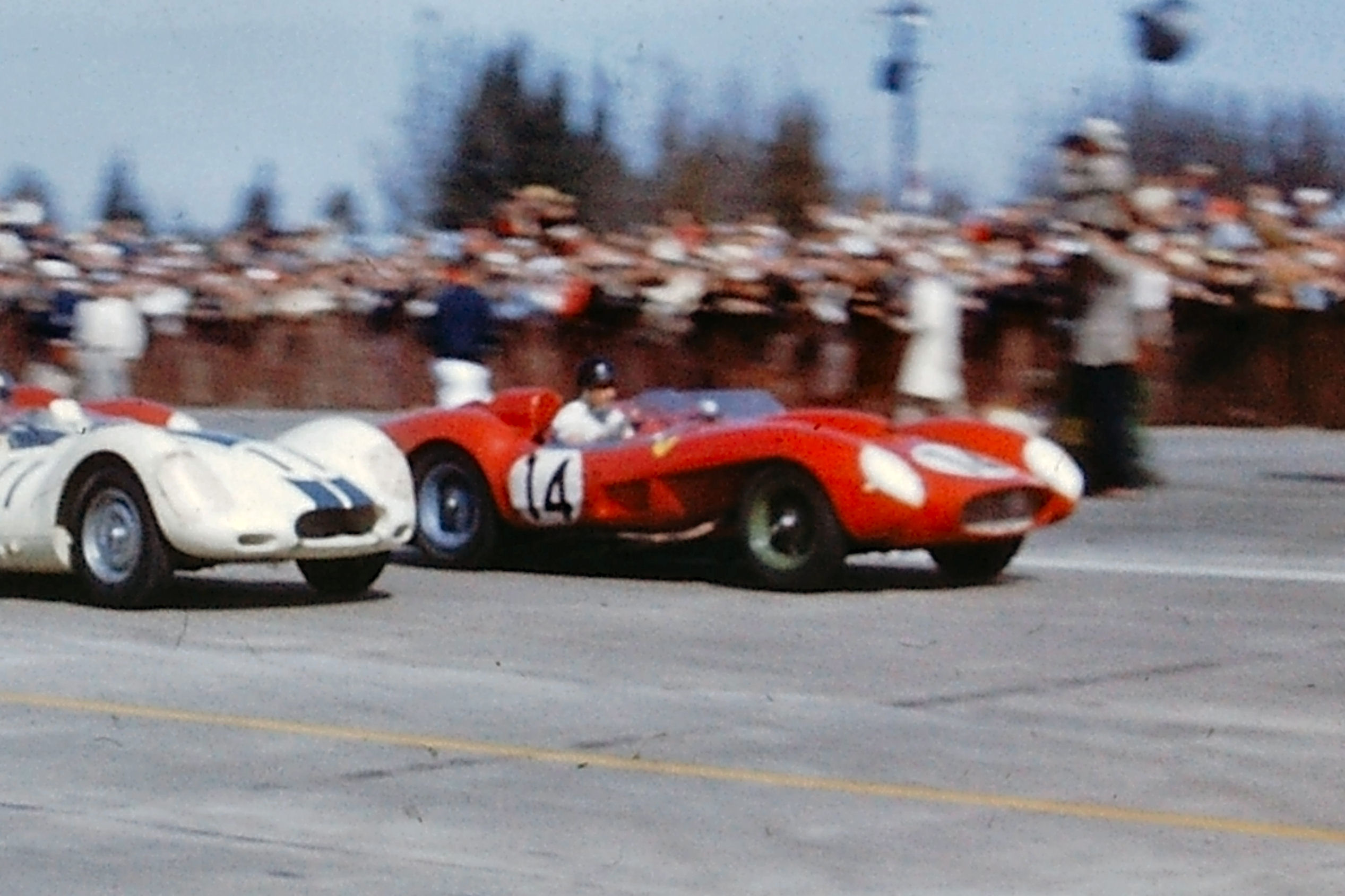
Hill driving a Ferrari 250 TR at the 12 hours of Sebring (1958)

Hill began driving full-time for the Ferrari Formula One team in 1959, earning three podium finishes and fourth place in the Drivers' Championship. The rear-mid engine Cooper-Climax stated to win races with undersize engines, and in 1960 with more capacity, the new construction principle dominated, leaving Ferrari winless until the end. Coopers, having won both championships again, and others boycotted the 1960 Italian Grand Prix for which the organizers chose the fast and dangerous banked oval version of Monza to give the engine power of Ferrari a chance to win. Phil Hill was the Ferrari driver, his win turned out to be the last win for a front-engined car in Formula 1, and also was the first Grand Prix win for an American driver in nearly forty years (except the Indianapolis 500, once part of Grand Prix World Championship series), since Jimmy Murphy won the 1921 French Grand Prix. Ferrari then returned the boycott favour, skipped the USA Grand Prix and did not travel to the Riverside circuit just east of Los Angeles, California. Phil Hill found a ride in a fourth BRP Cooper at his home circuit.

In the 1961 Formula One season, engines were limited to 1.5 liter, same as in Formula 2, and Ferrari used the mid-engine Dino-V6 powered former F2 car to build a new F1 racer, the Ferrari 156 "Shark Nose" that dominated in 1961 as the British teams once again had no suitable engine. Hill won the Belgian Grand Prix and with two races left trailed only his Ferrari teammate Wolfgang von Trips in the season standings. A crash during the Italian Grand Prix killed von Trips and fifteen spectators. Hill won the race and clinched the championship but the triumph was bittersweet. Ferrari's once again decided to skip the trip to America for the season's final round which deprived Hill of the opportunity to participate in his home race at Watkins Glen as the newly crowned World Champion.

When Hill returned for the 1962 Formula One season, his last with Ferrari which now was beaten by four British teams plus Porsche, Hill said, "I no longer have as much need to race, to win. I don't have as much hunger anymore. I am no longer willing to risk killing myself." Ferrari once again did not travel to the USA, thus Hill did not race at his home GP as defending World Champion.

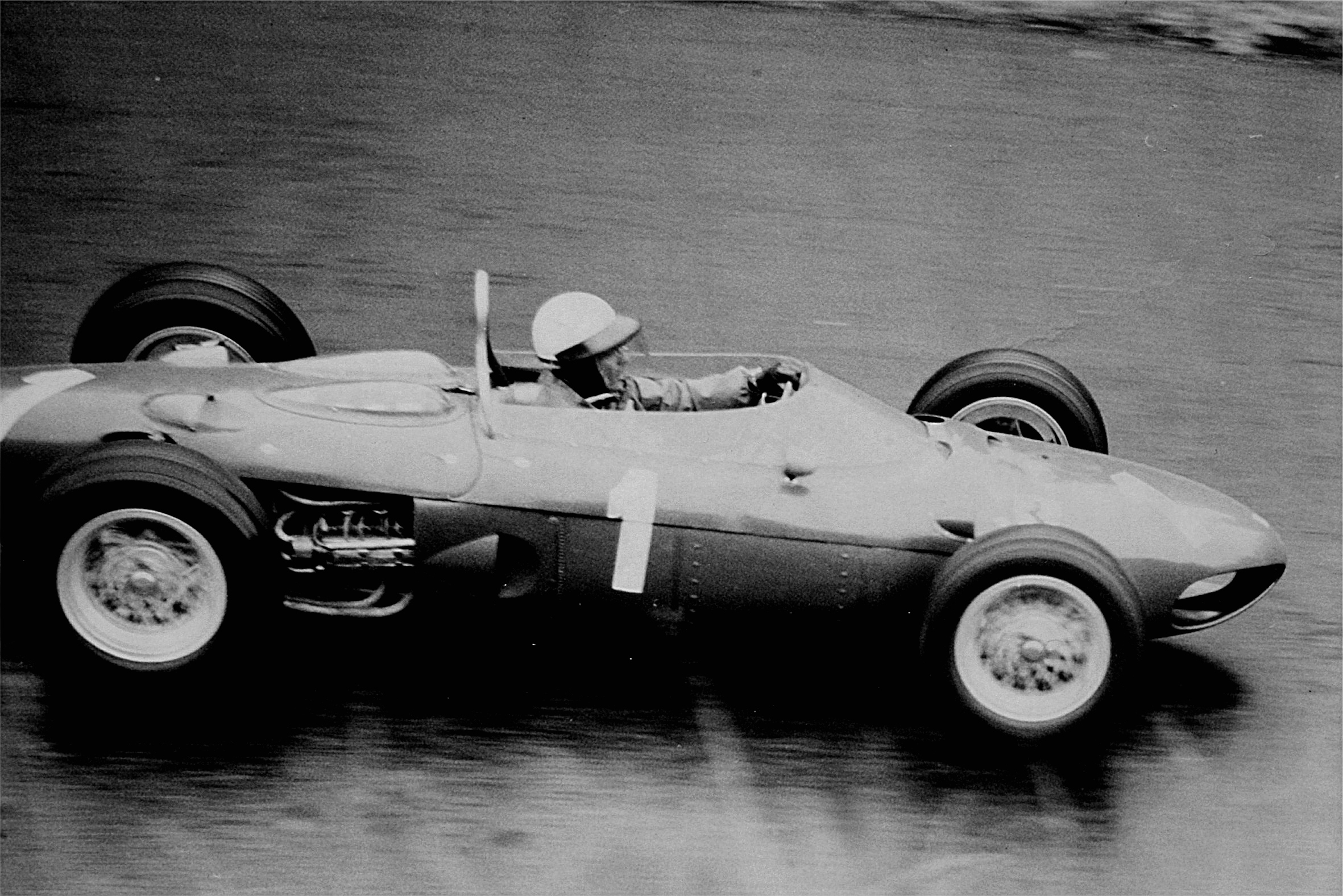
Hill driving for Ferrari at the 1962 German Grand Prix

After leaving Ferrari at the end of 1962, Hill, and fellow driver Giancarlo Baghetti started for the new team ATS created by ex-Ferrari engineers in the great walkout of 1961. In 1964, he continued in Formula One, driving for the Cooper Formula One Team before retiring from single-seaters at the end of the season and limiting his future driving to sports car racing with Ford Motor Company and the Chaparral Cars of Jim Hall.

During the 1966 Formula One season, Hill often participated in race weekends behind the wheel of a Ford GT40 prototype, accompanied by a remote-control Panasonic camera in order to produce images for the movie Grand Prix. In that same season, he entered his last Formula One race, the Italian Grand Prix at Monza, racing for Dan Gurney's All American Racers, but he failed to qualify. Hill retired from racing altogether in 1967.

Hill has the distinction of having won the first (a three-lap event at Carrell Speedway in a MG TC on July 24, 1949) and last races of his driving career, the final victory driving for Chaparral in the BOAC 500 at Brands Hatch in England in 1967. Hill also drove an experimental MG, EX-181, at Bonneville Salt Flats. The "Roaring Raindrop" had a 91-cubic-inch (1.5 L) supercharged MGA twin cam engine, using 86% methanol with nitrobenzene, acetone, and diethyl ether, for an output of 290 HP. In 1959, Hill attained 257 mph in this car, breaking the previous record of Stirling Moss in the same car, 246 mph. Hill appeared as himself on the December 11, 1961, episode of the game show To Tell the Truth. He received none of four possible votes.

== After racing ==
Following his retirement, Hill built up an award-winning classic car restoration business in the 1970s called Hill & Vaughn with business partner Ken Vaughn, until they sold the partnership to Jordanian Raja Gargour and Vaughn went on to run a separate business on his own in 1984. He remained with Gargour at Hill & Vaughn until the sale of the business again in 1995. He also worked as a television commentator for ABC's Wide World of Sports.

Hill had a long association with Road & Track magazine. He wrote several articles for them, including road tests and retrospective articles on historic cars and races. He shared his "grand old man" status at R&T with 1960s racing rival Paul Frère, who also died in 2008. In his last years, He devoted his time to his vintage car collection and judged at the Pebble Beach Concours d'Elegance more often than any other individual; 2007 was the 40th time he had judged the event. Hill was married to Alma, and had three children: Derek, Vanessa and Jennifer. Derek raced in International Formula 3000 in 2001, 2002 and 2003, but was forced to retire when Phil became ill with Parkinson's disease.

After traveling to the Monterey Historic Automobile Races in August 2008, Hill was taken to Community Hospital of the Monterey Peninsula in Monterey, California, where he died after a short illness from complications of Parkinson's disease on August 28. Inside Track, a three-volume book set came out at the tail end of 2017 covering the life and career of Phil Hill. It's a work that had started before his death. Turn 9 of the CW13 configuration of Buttonwillow Raceway Park is named after Hill.

== Racing record ==
=== Complete Formula One World Championship results ===
(key) (Races in bold indicate pole position; races in italics indicate fastest lap)

Year	Entrant	Chassis	Engine	1	2	3	4	5	6	7	8	9	10	11	WDC	Pts
1958	Jo Bonnier	Maserati 250F	Maserati 250F1 2.5 L6	ARG	MON	NED	500	BEL	FRA; 7	GBR					10th	9
1958	Scuderia Ferrari	Ferrari Dino 156 F2	Ferrari D156 1.5 V6								GER; 9				10th	9
1958	Scuderia Ferrari	Ferrari 246 F1	Ferrari 143 2.4 V6									POR; DNA	ITA; 3	MOR; 3	10th	9
1959	Scuderia Ferrari	Ferrari 246 F1	Ferrari 155 2.4 V6	MON; 4	500	NED; 6	FRA; 2	GBR	GER; 3	POR; Ret	ITA; 2	USA; Ret			4th	20
1960	Scuderia Ferrari	Ferrari 246 F1	Ferrari 155 2.4 V6	ARG; 8	MON; 3	500	NED; Ret	BEL; 4	FRA; 12†	GBR; 7	POR; Ret	**ITA**; 1			5th	16
1960	Yeoman Credit Racing Team	Cooper T51	Climax FPF 2.5 L4										USA; 6		5th	16
1961	Scuderia Ferrari SpA SEFAC	Ferrari 156	Ferrari 178 1.5 V6	MON; 3	**NED**; 2	**BEL**; 1	**FRA**; 9	**GBR**; 2	**GER**; 3	ITA; 1	USA; DNA				**1st**	**34 (38)**
1962	Scuderia Ferrari SpA SEFAC	Ferrari 156	Ferrari 178 1.5 V6	NED; 3	MON; 2	BEL; 3	FRA; DNA	GBR; Ret	GER; Ret	ITA; 11					6th	14
1962	Porsche System Engineering	Porsche 804	Porsche 753 1.5 F8								USA; DNS	RSA			6th	14
1963	Automobili Turismo e Sport	ATS 100	ATS 100 1.5 V8	MON	BEL; Ret	NED; Ret				ITA; 11	USA; Ret	MEX; Ret	RSA		NC	0
1963	Ecurie Filipinetti	Lotus 24	BRM P56 1.5 V8				FRA; NC	GBR	GER						NC	0
1964	Cooper Car Company	Cooper T73	Climax FWMV 1.5 V8	MON; 9†	NED; 8	BEL; Ret	FRA; 7	GBR; 6	GER; Ret			USA; Ret	MEX; 9†		19th	1
1964	Cooper Car Company	Cooper T66	Climax FWMV 1.5 V8							AUT; Ret	ITA				19th	1
1966	Phil Hill	Lotus 25	Climax FWMV 1.5 V8	MON; DNS											NC	0
1966	Phil Hill	McLaren M3A^{1}	Ford 289 4.7 V8		BEL; Ret	FRA	GBR	NED	GER						NC	0
1966	Anglo American Racers	Eagle T1F	Climax FPF 2.8 L4							ITA; DNQ	USA	MEX			NC	0

^{1} The M3A, fitted with a cine camera, was allowed to enter the race to capture the start for the film Grand Prix

† Driver did not finish the race, but was still classified.

=== Non-championship Formula One results ===
(key)

Year	Entrant	Chassis	Engine	1	2	3	4	5	6	7	8	9	10	11	12	13	14	15	16	17	18	19	20
1959	Scuderia Ferrari	Ferrari 246	Ferrari 155 2.4 V6	GLV	AIN	INT; 4	OUL	SIL															
1960	Scuderia Ferrari	Ferrari 246	Ferrari 155 2.4 V6	GLV	INT; 5	SIL; 4	LOM	OUL															
1962	Scuderia Ferrari SpA SEFAC	Ferrari 156	Ferrari 178 1.5 V6	CAP	BRX	LOM	LAV	GLV	PAU	AIN; 3	INT	NAP	MAL	CLP	RMS	SOL	KAN	MED	DAN	OUL	MEX	RAN	NAT
1963	Ecurie Filipinetti	Lotus 24	BRM P56 1.5 V8	LOM	GLV	PAU	IMO	SYR	AIN	INT	ROM	SOL; Ret	KAN	MED	AUT	OUL	RAN						
1964	Scuderia Centro Sud	BRM P57	BRM P56 1.5 V8	DMT; 4	NWT	SYR																	
1964	Cooper Car Company	Cooper T66	Climax FWMV 1.5 V8				AIN; Ret	INT; 4	SOL	MED	RAN												

=== Complete 24 Hours of Le Mans results ===
Year	Team	Co-drivers	Car	Class	Laps	Pos.	Class pos.
1953	(United States) Rees T. Makins	(United States) Fred Wacker Jr.	O.S.C.A. MT-4	S1.5	80	DNF (Clutch)	
1955	(Italy) Scuderia Ferrari	(Italy) Umberto Maglioli	Ferrari 735 LM	S5.0	76	DNF (Transmission)	
1956	(Italy) Scuderia Ferrari	(France) André Simon	Ferrari 625 LM	S3.0	107	DNF (Transmission)	
1957	(Italy) Scuderia Ferrari	(United Kingdom) Peter Collins	Ferrari 335 S	S5.0	2	DNF (Piston)	
1958	(Italy) Scuderia Ferrari	(Belgium) Olivier Gendebien	Ferrari 250 TR 58	S3.0	305	**1st**	**1st**
1959	(Italy) Scuderia Ferrari	(Belgium) Olivier Gendebien	Ferrari 250 TR 59	S3.0	263	DNF (Overheating)	
1960	(Italy) Scuderia Ferrari	(Germany) Wolfgang von Trips	Ferrari 250 TR 59/60	S3.0	22	DNF (Out of fuel)	
1961	(Italy) Scuderia Ferrari	(Belgium) Olivier Gendebien	Ferrari 250 TRI/61	S3.0	333	**1st**	**1st**
1962	(Italy) SpA Ferrari SEFAC	(Belgium) Olivier Gendebien	Ferrari 330 TRI/LM Spyder	E+3.0	331	**1st**	**1st**
1963	(United Kingdom) David Brown/Aston Martin Lagonda	(Belgium) Lucien Bianchi	Aston Martin DP215	P+3.0	29	DNF (Gearbox)	
1964	(United States) Ford Motor Company	(New Zealand) Bruce McLaren	Ford GT Mk.I	P5.0	192	DNF (Gearbox)	
1965	(United States) Shelby-American Inc.	(New Zealand) Chris Amon	Ford GT40X	P5.0	89	DNF (Clutch)	
1966	(United States) Chaparral Cars Inc.	(Sweden) Jo Bonnier	Chaparral 2D	P+5.0	111	DNF (Electrics)	
1967	(United States) Chaparral Cars Inc.	(United Kingdom) Mike Spence	Chaparral 2F	P+5.0	225	DNF (Transmission)	

=== Complete 12 Hours of Sebring results ===
Year	Team	Co-drivers	Car	Class	Laps	Pos.	Class pos.
1953	(United States) William Spear	(United States) Bill Spear	Ferrari 225 S	S3.0	56	DNF (Differential)	
1954	(United States) William Spear	(United States) Bill Spear	Ferrari 375 MM	S5.0	60	DNF (Rear end)	
1955	(United States) Allen Guiberson	(United States) Carroll Shelby	Ferrari 750 Monza Spyder	S3.0	182	**2nd**	**1st**
1956	(United States) George Tilp	(United States) Masten Gregory	Ferrari 857 S	S5.0	61	DNF (Bearings)	
1957	(Italy) Ferrari Factory	(West Germany) Wolfgang von Trips	Ferrari 290 MM	S5.0	106	DNF (Electrics)	
1958	(Italy) Scuderia Ferrari	(United Kingdom) Peter Collins	Ferrari 250 TR 58	S3.0	200	**1st**	**1st**
1959	(Italy) Scuderia Ferrari	(United States) Dan Gurney (United States) Chuck Daigh (Belgium) Olivier Gendebien	Ferrari 250 TR 59	S3.0	188	**1st**	**1st**
1961	(Italy) Sefac Automobile Ferrari	(Belgium) Olivier Gendebien	Ferrari 250 TRI/61	S3.0	210	**1st**	**1st**
1962	(United States) North American Racing Team	(Belgium) Olivier Gendebien	Ferrari 250 GTO	GT3.0	196	**2nd**	**1st**
1963	(United States) Ed Hugus	(United Kingdom) Ken Miles (United States) Lew Spencer	Shelby Cobra	GT+4.0	192	11th	**1st**
1963	(United States) Shelby American, Inc.	(United States) Dan Gurney	Shelby Cobra	GT+4.0	163	29th	5th
1964	Ford of France	(France) Jo Schlesser	Shelby Cobra	GT5.0	203	6th	**3rd**
1965	(United States) Shelby American, Inc.	(United States) Lew Spencer (United States) Jim Adams	Shelby Cobra Daytona Coupe	GT5.0	173	21st	5th
1965	(United States) Ken Miles	(United States) Richie Ginther	Ford GT40	P+4.0	37	DNF (Rear suspension)	
1966	(United States) Chaparral Cars Inc.	(Sweden) Jo Bonnier	Chaparral 2D	P+5.0	27	DNF (Oil leak)	

=== Complete 24 Hours of Daytona results ===
Year	Team	Co-drivers	Car	Class	Laps	Pos.	Class pos.
1962	(United States) North American Racing Team	(Mexico) Ricardo Rodríguez	Ferrari 246 SP	S2.5	82	**2nd**	**2nd**
1964	(United States) North American Racing Team	(Mexico) Pedro Rodríguez	Ferrari 250 GTO	GT+2.0	327	**1st**	**1st**
1966	(United States) Chaparral Cars Inc.	(Sweden) Jo Bonnier	Chaparral 2D	P+2.0	318	DNF (Wheel)	
1967	(United States) Chaparral Cars Inc.	(United Kingdom) Mike Spence	Chaparral 2F	P+2.0	93	DNF (Accident suspension damage)	

=== Complete Tasman Series results ===
(key)

Year	Entrant	Chassis	Engine	1	2	3	4	5	6	7	Pos.	Pts
1965	Bruce McLaren Motor Racing	Cooper T70	Climax FPF 2.5 L4	PUK; DNS	LEV; 4	WIG; Ret	TER; 3	WAR; Ret	SAN; 3	LON; 3	4th	15

== Honors and awards ==
- He was inducted in the Motorsports Hall of Fame of America as the sole sports cars driver in the inaugural 1989 class.
- In 1991, he was inducted into the International Motorsports Hall of Fame.
- He was inducted in the West Coast Stock Car Hall of Fame in 2022.

Primary career victories :

- 24 Hours of Le Mans (3) : 1958, 1961, 1962
- 12 Hours of Sebring (4) : 1955 (3.0 class), 1958, 1959, 1961
- 1000 km Buenos Aires (3) : 1956 (S+3.0 class), 1958, 1960
- 1000 km Nürburgring (2) : 1962, 1966
- F1 Italian Grand Prix (2) : 1960, 1961
- F1 Belgian Grand Prix (1) : 1961
- BOAC 500 (Brands Hatch) (1) : 1967
- Targa Florio (1) : 1960 (3.0 class)
- Road America 500 (2) : 1955, 1957
- Continental Tire Monterey Grand Prix (3) : 1950, 1953, 1955
- Los Angeles Times Grand Prix (1) : 1959
- Swedish Grand Prix (1) : 1956
- 2000 km Daytona (1) : 1964

== Notes ==
Sporting positions
Preceded by Jack Brabham	Formula One World Champion; 1961	Succeeded by Graham Hill
Preceded by Ron Flockhart; Ivor Bueb	Winner of the 24 Hours of Le Mans; 1958; With: Olivier Gendebien	Succeeded by Carroll Shelby; Roy Salvadori
Preceded by Olivier Gendebien; Paul Frère	Winner of the 24 Hours of Le Mans; 1961–1962; With: Olivier Gendebien	Succeeded by Ludovico Scarfiotti; Lorenzo Bandini
