= 1958 French Grand Prix =

← Previous race	Next race →
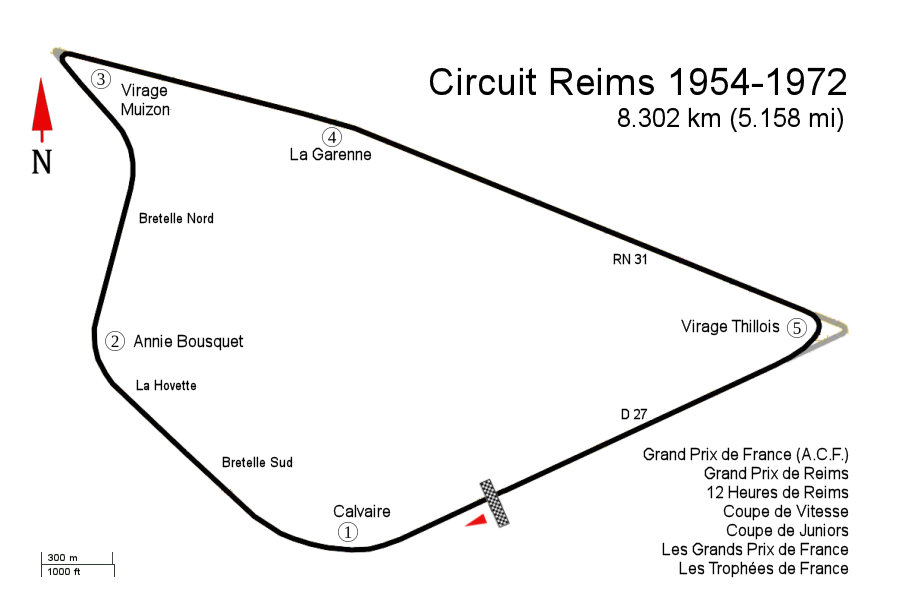
- Reims-Gueux layout

Race details
- Date: 6 July 1958
- Official name: XLIV Grand Prix de l'ACF
- Location: Reims circuit, Reims, France
- Course: Temporary road course
- Course length: 8.302 km (5.159 miles)
- Distance: 50 laps, 415.1 km (257.95 miles)

Pole position
Driver	(United Kingdom) Mike Hawthorn	Ferrari
- Time: 2:21.7

Fastest lap
Driver	(United Kingdom) Mike Hawthorn	Ferrari
- Time: 2:24.9

Podium
First	(United Kingdom) Mike Hawthorn	Ferrari
Second	(United Kingdom) Stirling Moss	Vanwall
Third	(Germany) Wolfgang von Trips	Ferrari

The 1958 French Grand Prix was a Formula One motor race held at Reims on 6 July 1958. It was race 6 of 11 in the 1958 World Championship of Drivers and race 5 of 10 in the 1958 International Cup for Formula One Manufacturers.

The race was won by Mike Hawthorn driving a Ferrari 246 F1; it was his first Formula One victory since the 1954 Spanish Grand Prix and would prove to be his last. It was also the last Formula One race for five-time World Champion Juan Manuel Fangio. On the final lap, Hawthorn eased up to let Fangio, running fifth at the time, finish on the lead lap of his last race. This turned out to be a blessing, as Peter Collins ran out of fuel on the final lap, allowing Fangio to secure fourth. Collins managed to push his car to finish fifth. Finishing in tenth was Indianapolis 500 winner, American Troy Ruttman driving a Maserati 250F for Scuderia Centro Sud in what would be his only Grand Prix appearance outside of the 500. Ruttman had qualified 15 seconds away from pole position and finished five laps down on Hawthorn.

== Fatalities ==
The F1 race was marred by Ferrari driver Luigi Musso's fatal accident at the Courbe du Calvaire. His car hurtled off course and crashed into a ditch. Musso was thrown out of the car, was critically injured and died later that day at a hospital near the track.

Of the 21 starters, six died in racing cars within the next three years. Musso died in the race itself, while Peter Collins died four weeks later in the 1958 German Grand Prix, Lewis-Evans at the Moroccan Grand Prix, Jean Behra in a support race for the 1959 German Grand Prix, Harry Schell in practice for the 1960 BRDC International Trophy, and Wolfgang von Trips and a dozen spectators died at the 1961 Italian Grand Prix.

== Formula 2 ==
The "II Coupe Internationale de Vitesse 1958" 1500cc Formula Two race was held on the same day, over 30 laps. Several current and future F1 pilots entered both events, with F2 already using Rear mid-engine, rear-wheel-drive layout cars from Cooper, and even sportscars with enveloping bodywork from Porsche and OSCA that were heavier but seemingly made up time on the long straights of Reims, a circuit similar to Le Mans. Pole (2'34.1") and victory by Jean Behra in a Porsche 718 RSK (converted central seat sportscar) ahead of Collins in a front engine Ferrari Dino 156 F2.

== Classification ==
=== Qualifying ===
Pos	No	Driver	Constructor	Time	Gap
1	4	(United Kingdom) Mike Hawthorn	Ferrari	2:21.7	—
2	2	(Italy) Luigi Musso	Ferrari	2:22.4	+0.7
3	16	(United States) Harry Schell	BRM	2:23.1	+1.4
4	42	(United Kingdom) Peter Collins	Ferrari	2:23.3	+1.6
5	10	(United Kingdom) Tony Brooks	Vanwall	2:23.4	+1.7
6	8	(United Kingdom) Stirling Moss	Vanwall	2:23.7	+2.0
7	18	(France) Maurice Trintignant	BRM	2:23.7	+2.0
8	34	(Argentina) Juan Manuel Fangio	Maserati	2:24.0	+2.3
9	14	(France) Jean Behra	BRM	2:24.2	+2.5
10	12	(United Kingdom) Stuart Lewis-Evans	Vanwall	2:25.3	+3.6
11	40	(Spain) Paco Godia	Maserati	2:27.1	+5.4
12	22	(Australia) Jack Brabham	Cooper-Climax	2:27.3	+5.6
13	36	(United States) Phil Hill	Maserati	2:29.5	+7.8
14	20	(United Kingdom) Roy Salvadori	Cooper-Climax	2:30.0	+8.3
15	32	(Italy) Gerino Gerini	Maserati	2:30.7	+9.0
16	38	(Sweden) Jo Bonnier	Maserati	2:30.9	+9.2
17	28	(United States) Carroll Shelby	Maserati	2:32.0	+10.3
18	30	(United States) Troy Ruttman	Maserati	2:36.0	+14.3
19	24	(United Kingdom) Graham Hill	Lotus-Climax	2:40.9	+19.2
20	26	(United Kingdom) Cliff Allison	Lotus-Climax	2:49.7	+28.0
21	6	(Germany) Wolfgang von Trips	Ferrari		

=== Race ===
Pos	No	Driver	Constructor	Laps	Time/Retired	Grid	Points
1	4	(United Kingdom) Mike Hawthorn	Ferrari	50	2:03:21.3	1	9^{1}
2	8	(United Kingdom) Stirling Moss	Vanwall	50	+ 24.6	6	6
3	6	(Germany) Wolfgang von Trips	Ferrari	50	+ 59.7	21	4
4	34	(Argentina) Juan Manuel Fangio	Maserati	50	+ 2:30.6	8	3
5	42	(United Kingdom) Peter Collins	Ferrari	50	+ 5:24.9	4	2
6	22	(Australia) Jack Brabham	Cooper-Climax	49	+ 1 Lap	12	
7	36	(United States) Phil Hill	Maserati	49	+ 1 Lap	13	
8	38	(Sweden) Jo Bonnier	Maserati	48	+ 2 Laps	16	
9	32	(Italy) Gerino Gerini	Maserati	47	+ 3 Laps	15	
10	30	(United States) Troy Ruttman	Maserati	45	+ 5 Laps	18	
11	20	(United Kingdom) Roy Salvadori	Cooper-Climax	37	+ 13 Laps	14	
Ret	16	(United States) Harry Schell	BRM	41	Overheating	3	
Ret	14	(France) Jean Behra	BRM	41	Fuel Pump	9	
Ret	12	(United Kingdom) Stuart Lewis-Evans (United Kingdom) Tony Brooks	Vanwall	35	Engine	10	
Ret	24	(United Kingdom) Graham Hill	Lotus-Climax	33	Overheating	19	
Ret	40	(Spain) Paco Godia	Maserati	28	Accident	11	
Ret	18	(France) Maurice Trintignant	BRM	23	Fuel Pump	7	
Ret	10	(United Kingdom) Tony Brooks	Vanwall	16	Engine	5	
Ret	2	(Italy) Luigi Musso	Ferrari	9	Fatal Accident	2	
Ret	28	(United States) Carroll Shelby	Maserati	9	Engine	17	
Ret	26	(United Kingdom) Cliff Allison	Lotus-Climax	6	Engine	20	

Notes

- ^1 – Includes 1 point for fastest lap

== Additional information ==
This was the debut World Championship Formula One race for future world champion Phil Hill.

== Championship standings after the race ==
Drivers' Championship standings

Pos	Driver	Points
1	(United Kingdom) Stirling Moss	23
2	(United Kingdom) Mike Hawthorn	23
3	(Italy) Luigi Musso	12
4	(United States) Harry Schell	10
5	(France) Maurice Trintignant	8

Constructors' Championship standings

	Pos	Constructor	Points
	1	(Italy) Ferrari	28
1	2	(United Kingdom) Vanwall	22
1	3	(United Kingdom) Cooper-Climax	19
	4	(United Kingdom) BRM	10
1	5	(Italy) Maserati	6

- Notes: Only the top five positions are included for both sets of standings.

Previous race: 1958 Belgian Grand Prix	FIA Formula One World Championship; 1958 season	Next race: 1958 British Grand Prix
Previous race: 1957 French Grand Prix	French Grand Prix	Next race: 1959 French Grand Prix
