= Wolfgang von Trips =

German racing driver (1928–1961)

Reichsgraf Wolfgang von Trips
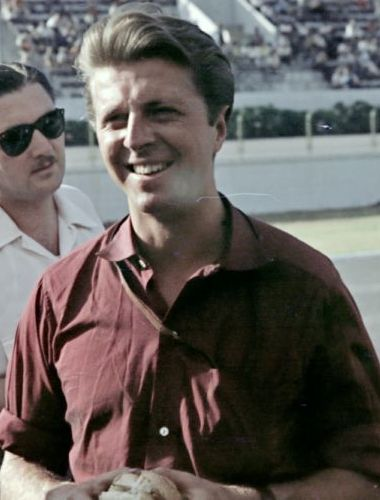
- Von Trips at the 1957 Argentine Grand Prix
- Born: Wolfgang Alexander Albert Eduard Maximilian Reichsgraf Berghe von Trips; 4 May 1928; Cologne, Rhineland, Prussia, Germany
- Died: 10 September 1961 (aged 33); Monza, Italy
- Cause of death: Injuries sustained at the 1961 Italian Grand Prix

Formula One World Championship career
- Nationality: (West Germany) West German
- Active years: 1956–1961
- Team(s): Ferrari, Porsche, Centro Sud
- Entries: 29 (27 starts)
- Championships: 0
- Wins: 2
- Podiums: 6
- Career points: 56
- Pole positions: 1
- Fastest laps: 0
- First entry: 1956 German Grand Prix
- First win: 1961 Dutch Grand Prix
- Last win: 1961 British Grand Prix
- Last entry: 1961 Italian Grand Prix

24 Hours of Le Mans career
- Years: 1956, 1958–1961
- Teams: Porsche, Ferrari
- Best finish: 5th (1956)
- Class wins: 1 (1956)

Wolfgang Alexander Albert Eduard Maximilian Reichsgraf Berghe von Trips (German pronunciation: [ˈvɔlfɡaŋ fɔn tʁɪps]; 4 May 1928 – 10 September 1961), also known as Wolfgang Graf Berghe von Trips, (Note: In German, Graf is a titular "Count".) was a German racing driver who competed in Formula One from 1956 to 1961. Nicknamed "Taffy", (Note: Von Trips was given the nickname Taffy by Mike Hawthorn, for reasons that have been lost throughout history.) von Trips was posthumously runner-up in the Formula One World Drivers' Championship in 1961 with Ferrari, and won two Grands Prix across six seasons.

Born in Cologne and raised in Kerpen, von Trips was born into a noble Rhineland family as an aristocrat and count of the Free State of Prussia. After struggling with agriculture, von Trips moved into motor racing. He made his Formula One debut at the 1956 Italian Grand Prix with Ferrari, failing to qualify. Von Trips made further appearances for Ferrari in 1957 at the Argentine, Monaco and Italian Grands Prix, scoring his maiden podium at the latter. He made regular appearances with the team in 1958, taking another podium at the French Grand Prix. Von Trips made two appearances for Porsche in 1959 before returning to Ferrari at the season-ending United States Grand Prix, with whom he scored regular points finishes throughout his 1960 campaign, finishing seventh in the championship.

Whilst leading the 1961 World Drivers' Championship, having taken his maiden victory at the Dutch Grand Prix and claiming his second at the British Grand Prix, von Trips died as a result of an accident during the Italian Grand Prix at Monza. After a collision with Jim Clark, von Trips lost control of his Ferrari 156, fatally wounding himself and 15 spectators as his car went airborne. Ferrari withdrew from the remaining United States Grand Prix—having already won the World Constructors' Championship—with teammate Phil Hill taking the title by one point to von Trips.

== Early life and family ==
The son of a noble Rhineland family, von Trips was born in Cologne, in the Rhine Province, which at the time was part of the Free State of Prussia during the years of the Weimar Republic. He was an aristocrat and count. Regarding personal names, Graf is a German title, translated as Count, not a first or middle name; the feminine form is Gräfin. Von Trips grew up in a Romantic-moated castle in Horrem (now a district of Kerpen), Cologne. The inheritance of his parents, the castle, and the agricultural and fruit-growing possessions weighted heavily on the young von Trips, who one day had to take sole responsibility for all these lands. From 1951 onwards, he struggled to train to become a qualified farmer as his true passion was racing.

== Formula One and sports car driver career ==
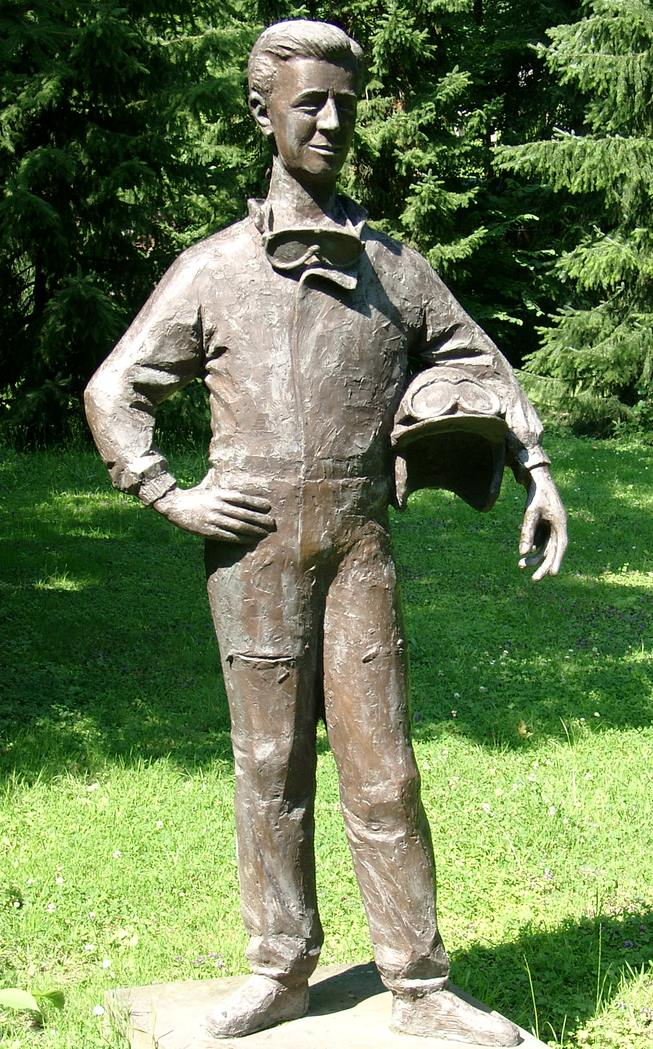
A statue of Wolfgang Graf Berghe von Trips in Kerpen, Germany

Von Trips had diabetes during his career and he always had high sugar snacks during the races to compensate for his low blood sugar levels. Von Trips participated in 29 Formula One World Championship Grand Prix races, debuting on 2 September 1956. He won two races, secured one pole position, achieved six podiums, and scored a total of 56 championship points. Friends and fellow drivers gave him the "Taffy" nickname.

Von Trips sustained a concussion when he spun off track at the Nürburgring during trial runs for a sports car race held in May 1957. His Ferrari was destroyed. It was the only one of its marque to be entered in the Gran Turismo car class of larger than 1600 cc. Von Trips was forced out of a Royal Automobile Club Grand Prix at Silverstone, in July 1958, when his Ferrari came into the pits on the 60th lap with no oil. The following August, he was fifth at Porto in the 1958 Portuguese Grand Prix, which was won by Stirling Moss in a Vanwall. Von Trips completed 49 laps and was one lap behind at the finish. Moss was more than five minutes ahead of Mike Hawthorn, who finished second in a Ferrari.

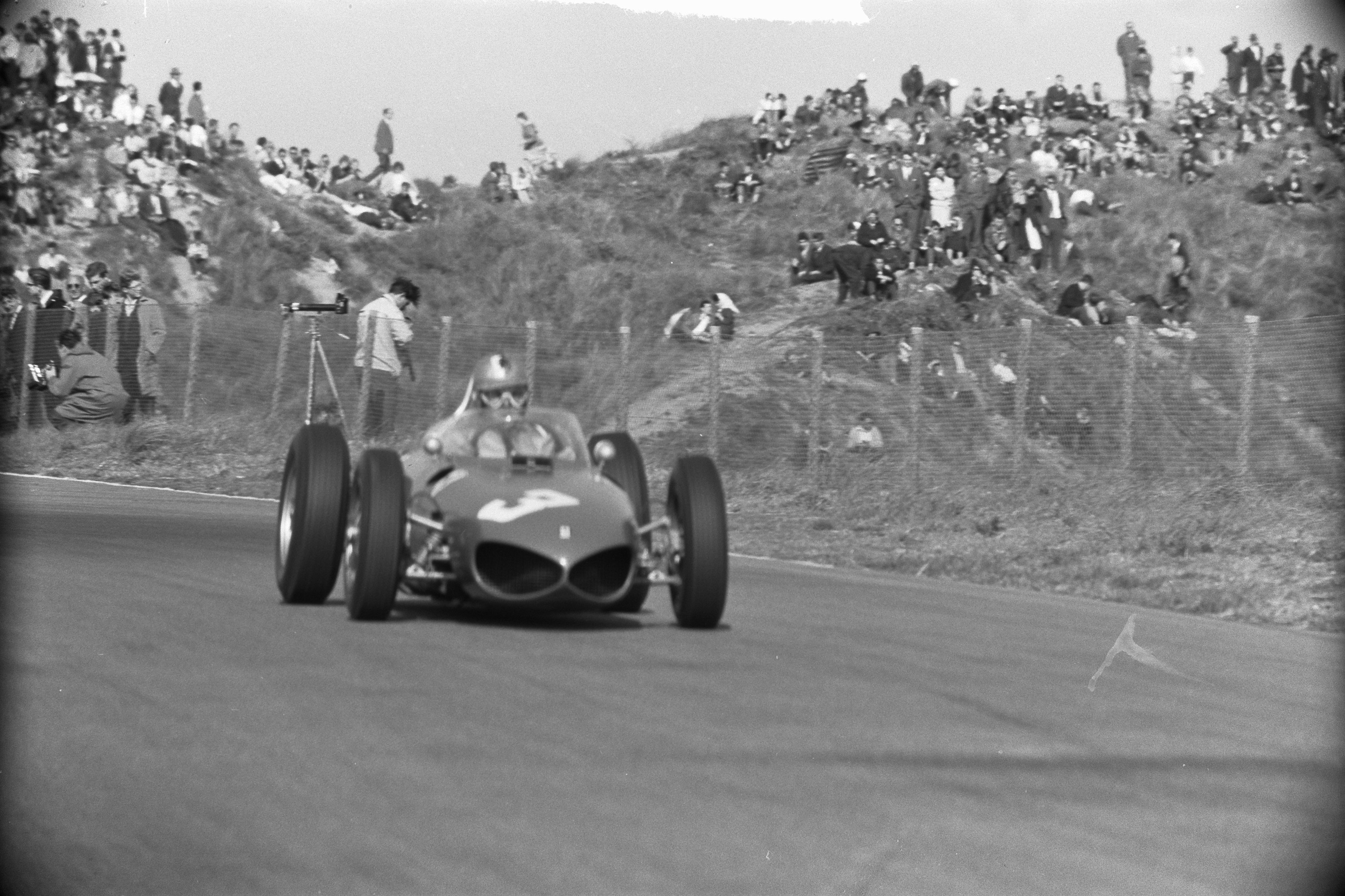
Von Trips at the 1961 Dutch Grand Prix

In July 1960, von Trips was victorious in a Formula Two event in a Ferrari, with a newly introduced engine in the rear. The race was in Stuttgart and was called the Solitude Formula Two Grand Prix. It was a 20-lap event with the winner averaging 164.49 km/h (102.21 mph) over 229 km (142 mi). He won the Targa Florio, ten-lap 721 kilometres (448 mi) race, in May 1961. Von Trips achieved an average speed of 103.42 km/h (64.26 mph) in his Ferrari with Olivier Gendebien of Belgium as his co-driver. Von Trips and Phil Hill traded the lead at Spa, Belgium, during the 1961 Belgian Grand Prix. Hill led most of the way in front of a crowd of 100,000 people. Ferraris captured the first four places at the race conclusion with von Trips finishing second. The Formula One World Championship driver competition at this juncture in 1961 was led by Hill with 19 points followed by von Trips with 18.

In 1961, von Trips established a go-kart race track in Kerpen, Germany. The track was later leased by Rolf Schumacher, whose sons, Michael and Ralf, made their first laps there. In the words of a 2007 German documentary film about von Trips, "If he had won then, he would have become as famous as Michael Schumacher later was – it would have been a kind of second miracle in Bern!"

== Death ==
The aftermath of von Trips's crash. His body can be seen on the left.

The 1961 Italian Grand Prix on 10 September saw von Trips tightly locked in the battle for the Formula One World Drivers' Championship that year with his American teammate Phil Hill. On the second lap of the race at Monza, his Ferrari collided with Jim Clark's Lotus on the long straight before Parabolica, approaching what is now Curva Alboreto; he had made contact with Clark while he was trying to overtake him, which caused him to lose control of his car and went straight into the crowd at high speed. His car became airborne and crashed into a side barrier, fatally throwing von Trips from the car, and killing fifteen spectators. Von Trips died before reaching the hospital. The toll of the accident remains the highest in the history of Formula One. As a result of the accident, the FIA banned Formula One from competing on circuits with steeply-banked corners.

Clark and his car were subjected to an investigation; he was initially accused of manslaughter, before the charges were dropped. At the time, Clark described the accident by saying: "Von Trips and I were racing along the straight and were nearing one of the banked curves, the one on the southern end. We were about 100 metres from the beginning of the curve. Von Trips was running close to the inside of the track. I was closely following him, keeping near the outside. At one point von Trips shifted sideways so that my front wheels collided with his back wheels. It was the fatal moment. Von Trips's car spun twice and went into the guardrail along the inside of the track. Then it bounced back, struck my own car and bounced down into the crowd." Movie footage of the crash that surfaced after the race showed that Clark's memory of the incident was inaccurate; after colliding with Clark, von Trips's car rode directly up an embankment on the outside of the track and struck a fence behind which spectators were closely packed. At the time of his death, von Trips was leading the Formula One World Championship. He had previous incidents at the Autodromo Nazionale Monza, where he crashed cars in the 1956 Italian Grand Prix and the 1958 Italian Grand Prix, and was injured in both events.

== Racing record ==
=== Complete Formula One World Championship results ===
(key) (Races in bold indicate pole position)

Year	Entrant	Chassis	Engine	1	2	3	4	5	6	7	8	9	10	11	WDC	Points
1956	Scuderia Ferrari	Lancia-Ferrari D50	Ferrari V8	ARG	MON	500	BEL	FRA	GBR	GER	ITA; DNS				NC	0
1957	Scuderia Ferrari	Lancia-Ferrari D50A	Ferrari V8	ARG; 6 *											14th	4
1957	Scuderia Ferrari	Ferrari 801	Ferrari V8		MON; Ret †	500	FRA	GBR	GER	PES	ITA; 3				14th	4
1958	Scuderia Ferrari	Ferrari Dino 246	Ferrari V6	ARG	MON; Ret	NED	500	BEL	FRA; 3	GBR; Ret	GER; 4	POR; 5	ITA; Ret	MOR	12th	9
1959	Dr Ing hcf Porsche KG	Porsche 718 F2	Porsche Flat-4	MON; Ret	500	NED	FRA	GBR	GER; DNS	POR	ITA				NC	0
1959	Scuderia Ferrari	Ferrari Dino 246	Ferrari V6									USA; 6			NC	0
1960	Scuderia Ferrari	Ferrari Dino 246	Ferrari V6	ARG; 5	MON; 8	500	NED; 5	BEL; Ret	FRA; 11	GBR; 6	POR; 4				7th	10
1960	Scuderia Ferrari	Ferrari 246P F2	Ferrari V6									ITA; 5			7th	10
1960	Scuderia Centro Sud	Cooper T51	Maserati Straight-4										USA; 9		7th	10
1961	Scuderia Ferrari	Ferrari 156	Ferrari V6	MON; 4	NED; 1	BEL; 2	FRA; Ret	GBR; 1	GER; 2	**ITA**; Ret	USA				**2nd**	**33**

* Indicates shared drive with Cesare Perdisa and Peter Collins
† Indicates shared drive with Mike Hawthorn

=== Formula One Non-Championship results ===
(key) (Races in bold indicate pole position) (Races in italics indicate fastest lap)

Year	Entrant	Chassis	Engine	1	2	3	4	5	6	7	8	9	10	11	12	13	14	15	16	17	18	19	20	21
1957	Scuderia Ferrari	Lancia D50	Lancia V8	BUE; 8	SYR	PAU	GLV	NAP	RMS	CAE	INT	MOD	MOR											
1961	Scuderia Ferrari	Ferrari 156	Ferrari V6	LOM	GLV	PAU	BRX	VIE	AIN	SYR	NAP	LON	SIL	SOL; DNA	KAN	DAN	MOD	FLG	OUL	LEW	VAL	RAN	NAT	RSA

=== 24 Hours of Le Mans results ===
Year	Team	Co-Driver(s)	Car	Class	Laps	Pos.	Class Pos.
1956	(Germany) Porsche KG	(Germany) Richard von Frankenberg	Porsche 550A Coupe	S 1.5	282	5th	**1st**
1958	(Italy) Scuderia Ferrari	(Germany) Wolfgang Seidel	Ferrari 250 TR/58	S 3.0	101	DNF	DNF
1959	(Germany) Porsche KG	(Sweden) Jo Bonnier	Porsche 718 RSK	S 2.0	182	DNF	DNF
1960	(Italy) Scuderia Ferrari	(United States) Phil Hill	Ferrari 250 TR59/60	S 3.0	22	DNF	DNF
1961	(Italy) SEFAC Ferrari	(United States) Richie Ginther	Ferrari 246 SP	S 2.5	231	DNF	DNF

== See also ==
- Formula One drivers from Germany
- La Passione (1996 film)

Preceded by Giulio Cabianca	Formula One fatal accidents 10 September 1961	Succeeded by Ricardo Rodríguez
Awards
Preceded by Georg Thoma	German Sportsman of the Year; 1961	Succeeded by Gerhard Hetz
