= Ferrari 156 F1 =

Ferrari 156
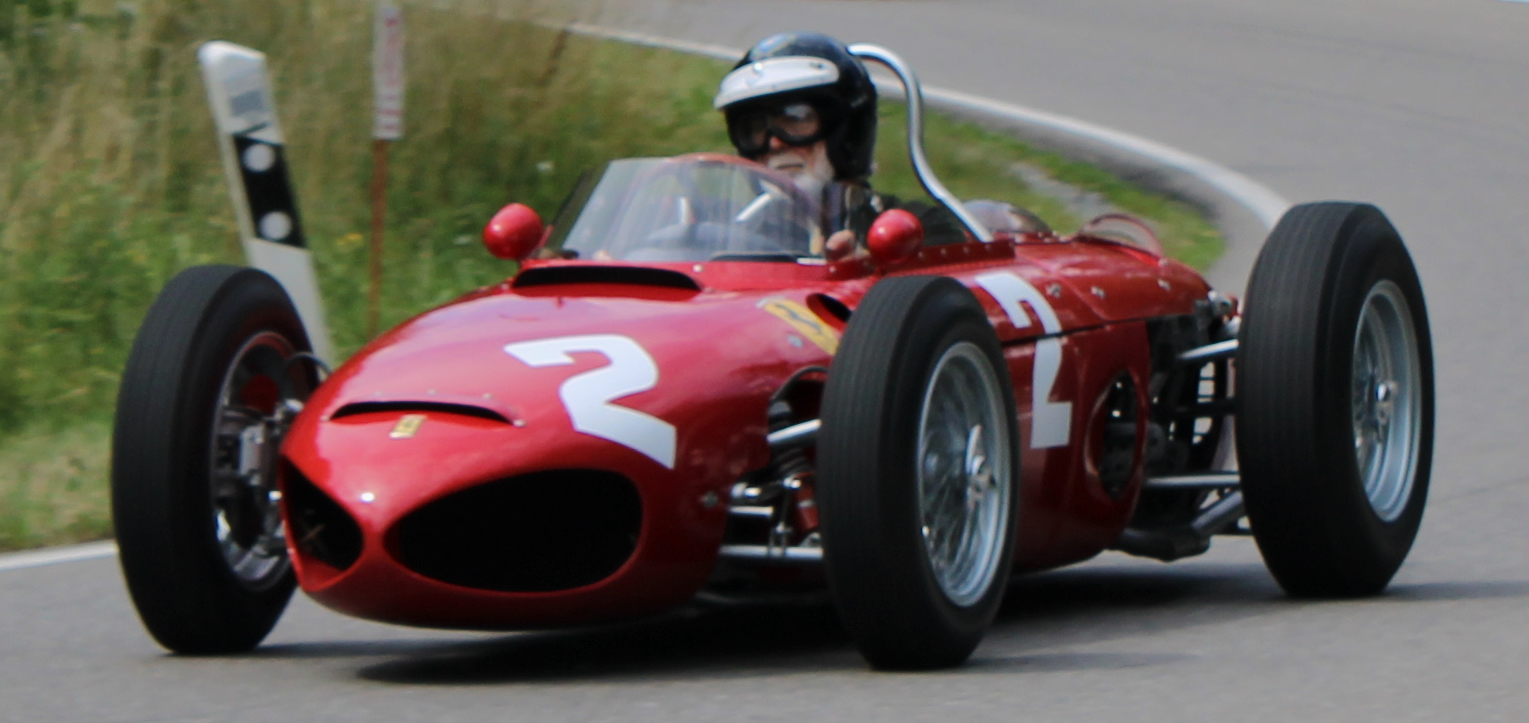
- Category: Formula One
- Constructor: Ferrari
- Designers: Vittorio Jano (Technical Director); Carlo Chiti (Chief Designer)
- Predecessor: 246 F1/246 P
- Successor: 158

Technical specifications
- Chassis: Tubular Spaceframe
- Engine: Ferrari Type 178, 1,476 cc (90.1 cu in), 120° V6 2 valves per cylinder DOHC, naturally aspirated Mid-engined, longitudinally mounted
- Transmission: Ferrari Type 543/C 5-speed manual
- Fuel: Shell
- Tyres: Dunlop

Competition history
- Notable entrants: Scuderia Ferrari; FISA; Scuderia Sant Ambroeus
- Notable drivers: (United States) Phil Hill (West Germany) Wolfgang von Trips (United States) Richie Ginther (Belgium) Willy Mairesse (Italy) Giancarlo Baghetti (Mexico) Ricardo Rodríguez (Italy) Lorenzo Bandini (United Kingdom) John Surtees (Italy) Ludovico Scarfiotti
- Debut: 1961 Monaco Grand Prix
Races	Wins	Poles	F/Laps
29	7	7	7
- Constructors' Championships: 2 (1961, 1964)
- Drivers' Championships: 1 (1961 – Phil Hill)
- Unless otherwise stated, all data refer to Formula One World Championship Grands Prix only.

The Ferrari 156 was a racing car made by Ferrari in 1961 to comply with then-new Formula One regulations that reduced engine displacement from 2.5- to 1.5-litres, similar to the pre-1961 Formula Two class for which Ferrari had developed a mid-engined car also called 156 F2.

Phil Hill won the 1961 World Championship of Drivers and Ferrari secured the 1961 International Cup for F1 Manufacturers, both victories achieved with the 156.

== Development ==
=== Sharknose ===
The 1961 version was affectionately dubbed "sharknose" due to its characteristic air intake "nostrils". A similar intake duct styling was applied to the five SP-series Ferraris in 1961 and 1962 that were also designed by Carlo Chiti.

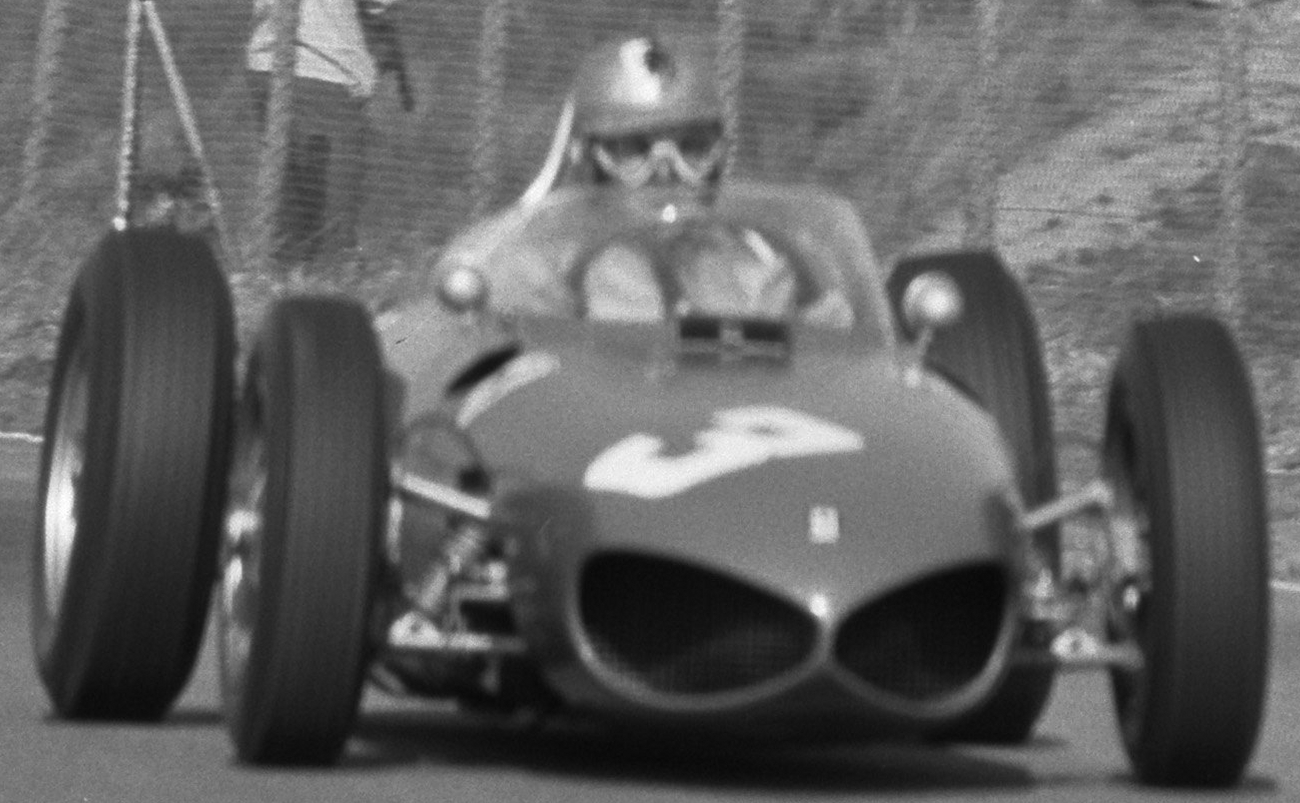
Wolfgang von Trips (1928–1961) driving the 156 at the 1961 Dutch Grand Prix, showing the car's distinctive "sharknose"

Ferrari started the season with a 65-degree Dino engine, then replaced by a new engine with the V-angle increased to 120-degrees and designed by Carlo Chiti. A V-6 engine with 120-degree bank is smoother at producing power because every 120-degree rotation of engine crankshaft produces a power pulse. This change increased the power by 7 kW (10 hp). Bore and stroke were 73.0 mm × 58.8 mm (2.87 in × 2.31 in) with a displacement of 1,476.60 cc (90.108 cu in) and a claimed 140 kW (188 hp) at 9500 rpm. For 1962, a 4-valve per cylinder version was planned with 147 kW (197 hp) at 10,000 rpm, but never appeared. At the 1962 British Grand Prix, Phil Hill raced a new version with a six-speed transmission mounted in front of the engine. In August, at the German Grand Prix, Lorenzo Bandini tested a non-sharknose variant with modified front and rear suspension and a smaller radiator, heralding the 156 Aero used in 1963.

=== 1963 Ferrari 156 Aero ===
The updated Ferrari 156, used in the 1963 and 1964 seasons, did not feature the distinctive sharknose design. but had a rather conventional intake, somewhat larger than the Ferrari 158 introduced in 1964.

In 1963 the 120° V6 employed Bosch direct-fuel injection instead of carburetors and output increased to 147 kW (197 hp). The last victory for the Ferrari 156 was achieved by Italian Lorenzo Bandini in the 1964 Austrian Grand Prix.

== Technical data ==
Technical data	156 F1	156 Aero
Engine:	Mid-mounted 120° 6-cylinder V-engine
displacement:	1476.6 cm³
Bore x stroke:	73 x 58.8 mm
Compression:	9.8:1
Max power at rpm:	190 hp at 9 500 rpm	205 hp at 10 500 rpm
Valve control:	Double Overhead Camshafts per cylinder bank, 2 valves per cylinder
Fuel system:	2 pcs Weber 40 IF3C	Bosch fuel injection
Gearbox:	5-speed manual	6-speed manual
suspension front:	Double cross links, coil springs
suspension rear:	Double cross links, coil springs	Upper transverse link, lower triangle link, double longitudinal links, coil springs, anti-roll bars
Brakes:	Hydraulic disc brakes
Chassis & body:	Tubular spaceframe with aluminum body	Self-supporting monocoque
Wheelbase:	230 cm	238 cm
Dry weight:	420 kg	460 kg
Maximum speed:	260 km/h

== Gallery ==
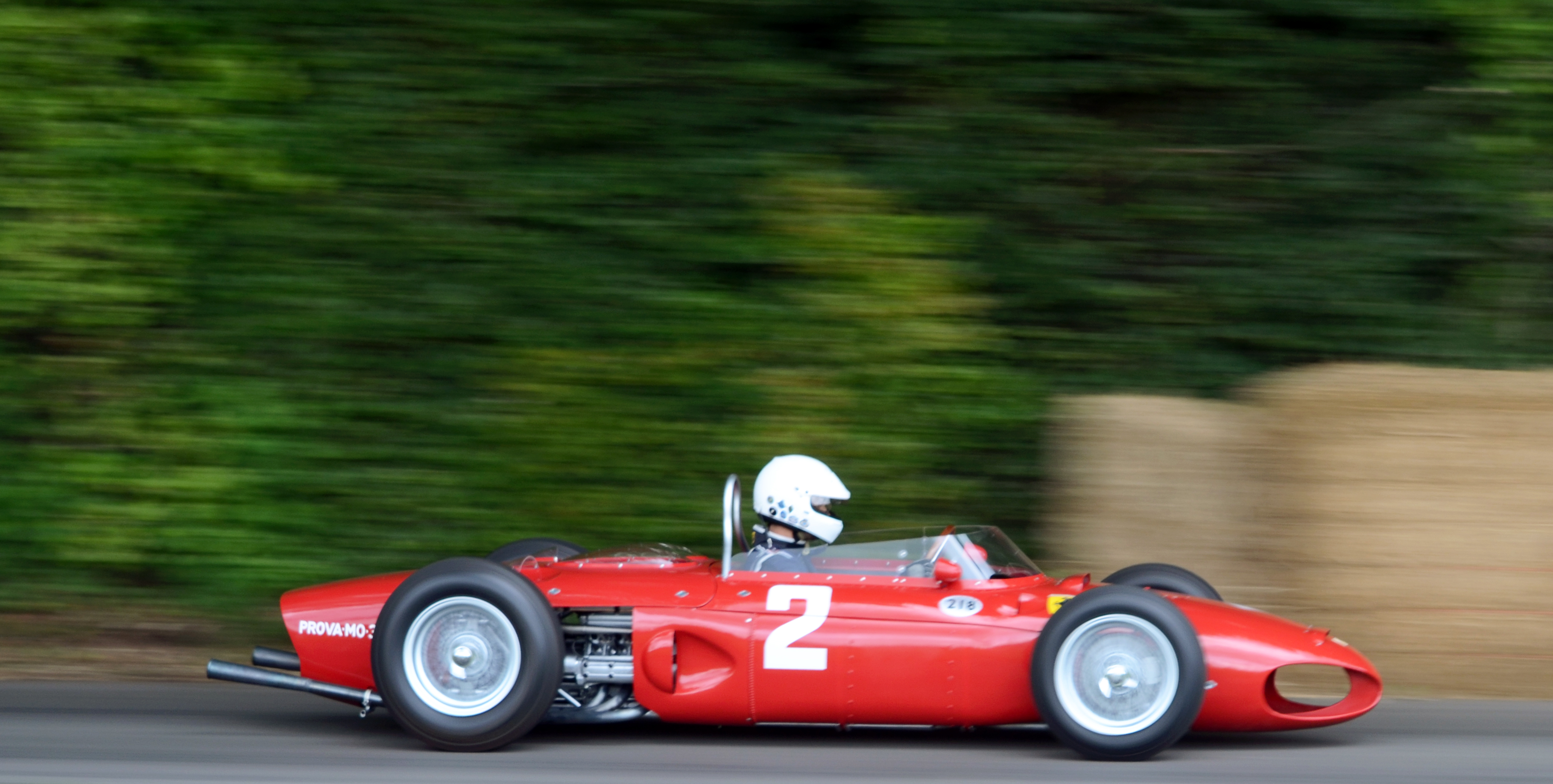
A Ferrari 156 Sharknose (replica) car at the 2017 Goodwood Festival of Speed

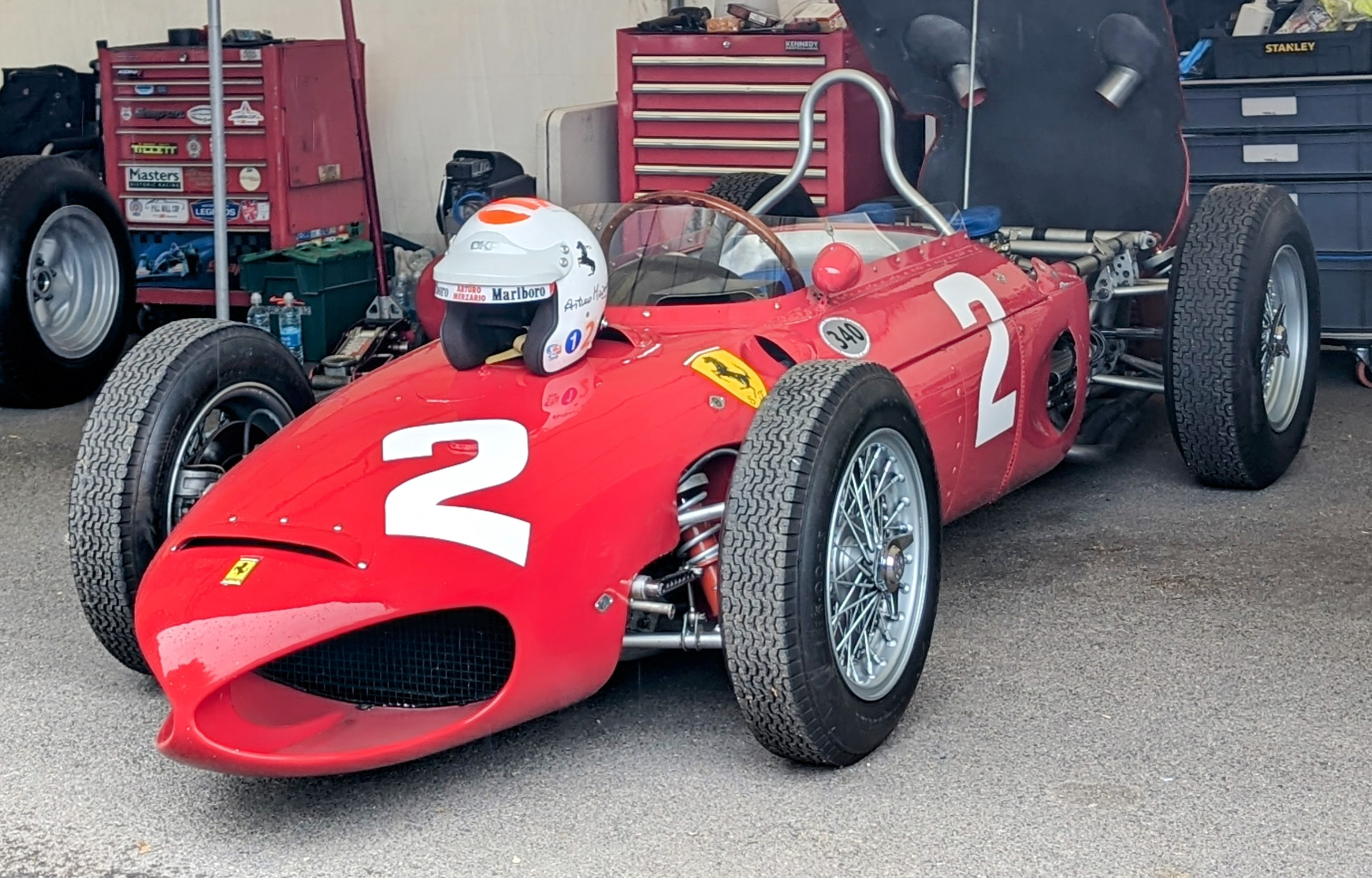
Front view of the Ferrari 156

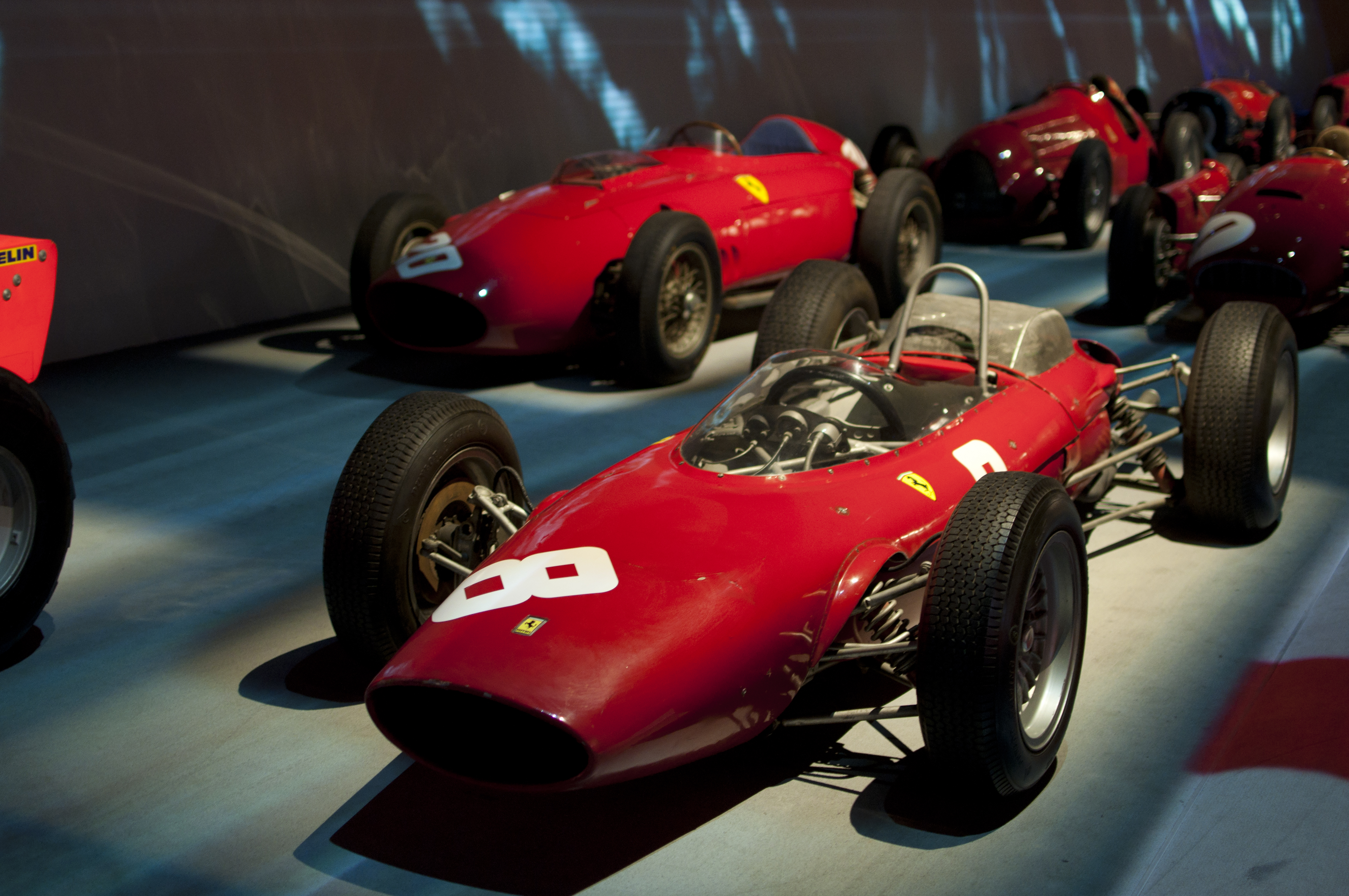
1963 Ferrari 156 Aero (replica)

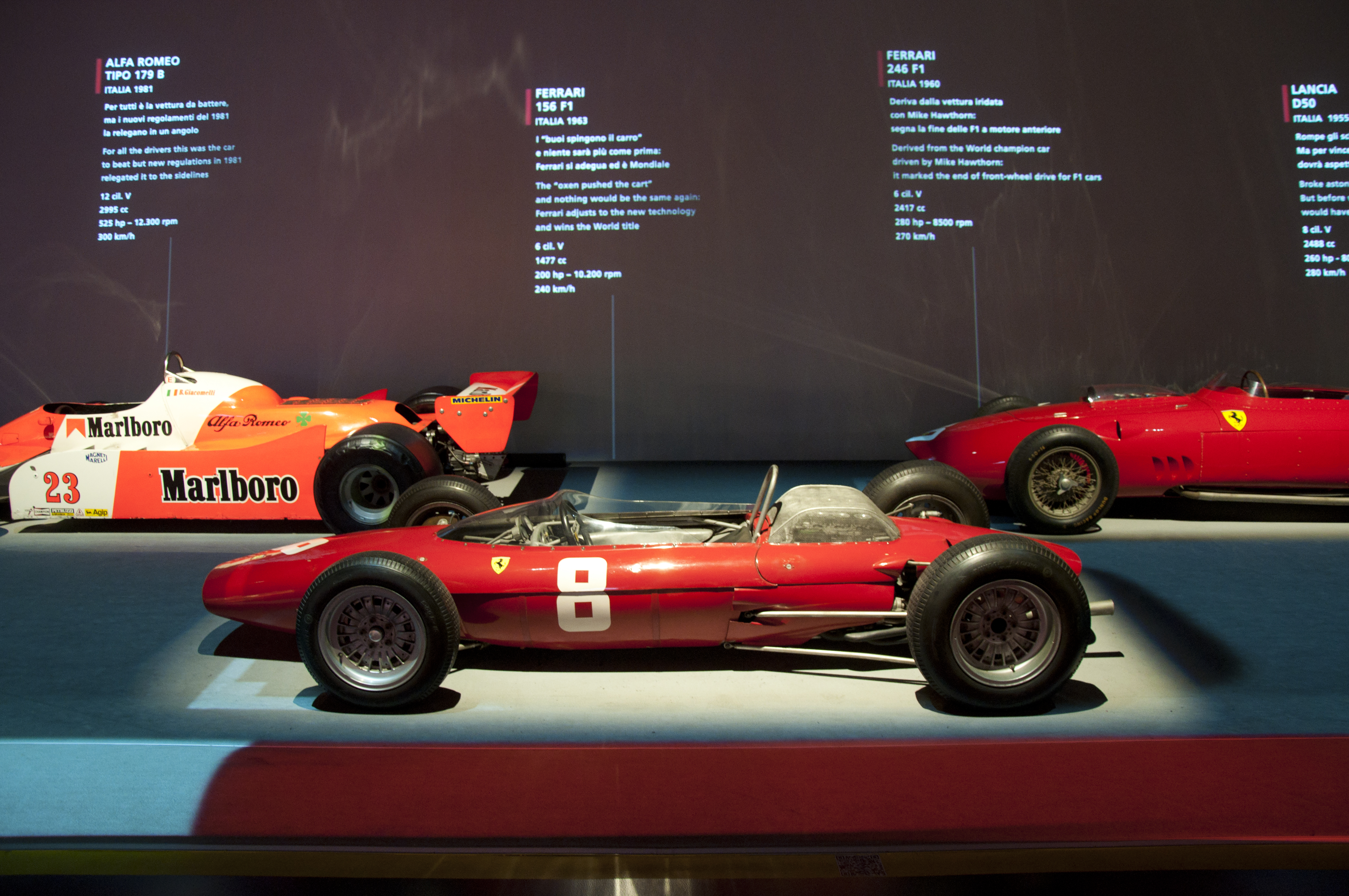
1963 Ferrari 156 (replica) at the F1 Museo Nazionale dell'Automobile Torino

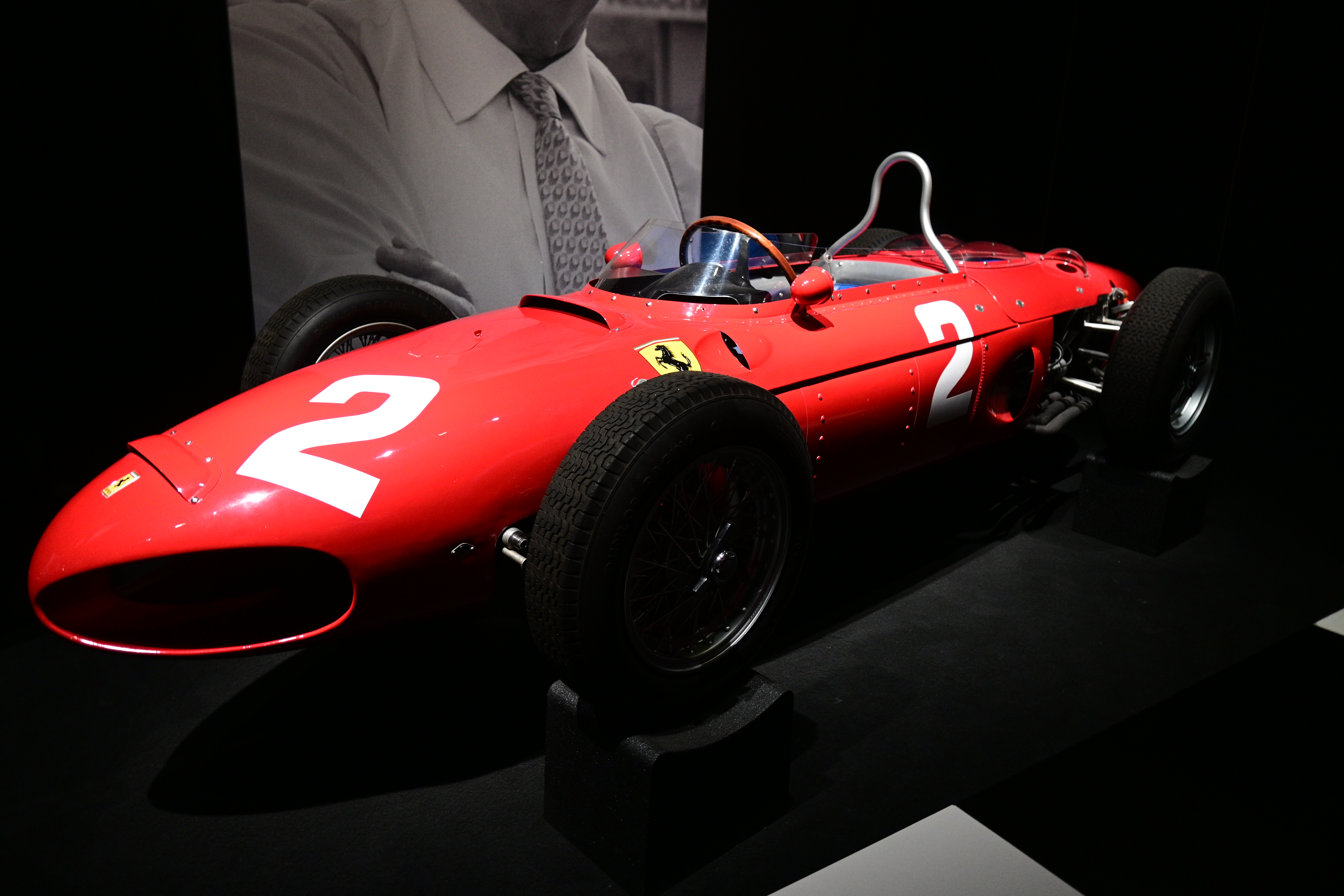
Phil Hill's 1961 (replica) Ferrari 156 at the Formula 1 Exhibition in London

== Monza crash ==
On September 10, 1961, after a collision with Jim Clark's Lotus on the second lap of the Italian Grand Prix, the 156 of Wolfgang von Trips (Hill's teammate) became airborne and crashed into a side barrier, fatally throwing him from the car and killing fifteen spectators.

== Replicas ==
Ferrari factory policy in the early 1960s meant that all the original cars were scrapped. Since then at least two replicas of the 156 F1 have been constructed. One was created for the film La Passione, which features the car as a major subject, and another was constructed by an enthusiast for personal use. A 156 replica is also exhibited in the "Galleria Ferrari".

== Famous drivers ==
- Phil Hill
- Wolfgang von Trips
- Richie Ginther
- Willy Mairesse
- Olivier Gendebien
- Giancarlo Baghetti
- Ricardo Rodríguez
- Lorenzo Bandini
- John Surtees
- Ludovico Scarfiotti
- Pedro Rodríguez

== Complete Formula One World Championship results ==
(key) (results in bold indicate pole position; results in italics indicate fastest lap)

Year	Entrant	Engine	Tyres	Drivers	1	2	3	4	5	6	7	8	9	10	Points	WCC
1961	Scuderia Ferrari SpA SEFAC	Ferrari 188 1.5 V6; Ferrari 178 1.5 V6	D		MON	NED	BEL	FRA	GBR	GER	ITA	USA			40 (52)	1st
1961	Scuderia Ferrari SpA SEFAC	Ferrari 188 1.5 V6; Ferrari 178 1.5 V6	D	Richie Ginther	2	5	3	15	3	8	Ret	DNA			40 (52)	1st
1961	Scuderia Ferrari SpA SEFAC	Ferrari 188 1.5 V6; Ferrari 178 1.5 V6	D	Phil Hill	3	**2**	**1**	**9**	**2**	**3**	1	DNA			40 (52)	1st
1961	Scuderia Ferrari SpA SEFAC	Ferrari 188 1.5 V6; Ferrari 178 1.5 V6	D	Wolfgang von Trips	4	1	2	Ret	1	2	**Ret**				40 (52)	1st
1961	Scuderia Ferrari SpA SEFAC	Ferrari 188 1.5 V6; Ferrari 178 1.5 V6	D	Olivier Gendebien			4								40 (52)	1st
1961	Scuderia Ferrari SpA SEFAC	Ferrari 188 1.5 V6; Ferrari 178 1.5 V6	D	Willy Mairesse			Ret			Ret					40 (52)	1st
1961	Scuderia Ferrari SpA SEFAC	Ferrari 188 1.5 V6; Ferrari 178 1.5 V6	D	Ricardo Rodríguez							Ret				40 (52)	1st
1961	Scuderia Ferrari SpA SEFAC	Ferrari 188 1.5 V6; Ferrari 178 1.5 V6	D	Pedro Rodríguez								DNA			40 (52)	1st
1961	FISA	Ferrari 188 1.5 V6; Ferrari 178 1.5 V6	D	Giancarlo Baghetti				1							40 (52)	1st
1961	Scuderia Sant Ambroeus	Ferrari 188 1.5 V6; Ferrari 178 1.5 V6	D	Giancarlo Baghetti					Ret		Ret				40 (52)	1st
1962	Scuderia Ferrari SpA SEFAC	Ferrari 178 1.5 V6	D		NED	MON	BEL	FRA	GBR	GER	ITA	USA	RSA		18	6th
1962	Scuderia Ferrari SpA SEFAC	Ferrari 178 1.5 V6	D	Phil Hill	3	2	3	DNA	Ret	Ret	11				18	6th
1962	Scuderia Ferrari SpA SEFAC	Ferrari 178 1.5 V6	D	Giancarlo Baghetti	4		Ret		DNA	10	5	DNA			18	6th
1962	Scuderia Ferrari SpA SEFAC	Ferrari 178 1.5 V6	D	Ricardo Rodríguez	Ret	DNS	4	DNA	DNA	6	14				18	6th
1962	Scuderia Ferrari SpA SEFAC	Ferrari 178 1.5 V6	D	Lorenzo Bandini		3		DNA		Ret	8	DNA			18	6th
1962	Scuderia Ferrari SpA SEFAC	Ferrari 178 1.5 V6	D	Willy Mairesse		7	Ret				4	DNA			18	6th
1963	Scuderia Ferrari SpA SEFAC	Ferrari 178 1.5 V6	D		MON	BEL	NED	FRA	GBR	GER	ITA	USA	MEX	RSA	26	4th
1963	Scuderia Ferrari SpA SEFAC	Ferrari 178 1.5 V6	D	Willy Mairesse	Ret	Ret				Ret					26	4th
1963	Scuderia Ferrari SpA SEFAC	Ferrari 178 1.5 V6	D	John Surtees	4	Ret	3	Ret	2	1	**Ret**	9	DSQ	Ret	26	4th
1963	Scuderia Ferrari SpA SEFAC	Ferrari 178 1.5 V6	D	Ludovico Scarfiotti		DNA	6	DNS							26	4th
1963	Scuderia Ferrari SpA SEFAC	Ferrari 178 1.5 V6	D	Lorenzo Bandini							Ret	5	Ret	5	26	4th
1964	Scuderia Ferrari SpA SEFAC	Ferrari 178 1.5 V6	D		MON	NED	BEL	FRA	GBR	GER	AUT	ITA	USA	MEX	45 (49)	1st
1964	Scuderia Ferrari SpA SEFAC	Ferrari 178 1.5 V6	D	Lorenzo Bandini	10				5	3	1				45 (49)	1st
1964	Scuderia Ferrari SpA SEFAC	Ferrari 178 1.5 V6	D	Ludovico Scarfiotti								9			45 (49)	1st
1964	North American Racing Team	Ferrari 178 1.5 V6	D	Pedro Rodríguez										6	45 (49)	1st
