= Ferrari 246 P =

Formula One racing car

Ferrari 246 P Ferrari 156 F2
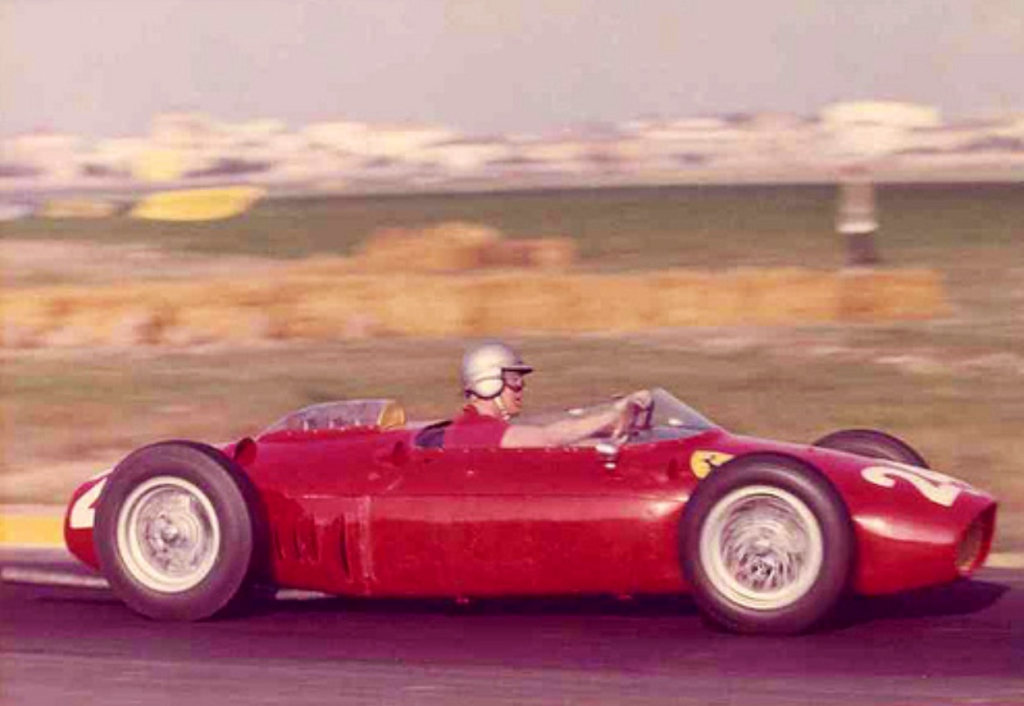
- Category: Formula One; Formula Two
- Constructor: Ferrari
- Designers: Vittorio Jano (Technical Director); Carlo Chiti (Chief Designer)
- Predecessor: 246 F1
- Successor: 156

Technical specifications
- Chassis: Steel spaceframe
- Suspension (front): Double wishbones, coil springs, telescopic dampers and anti-roll bar.
- Suspension (rear): Double wishbones, coil springs and co-axial telescopic dampers.
- Axle track: Front: 1,220 mm (48 in); Rear: 1,190 mm (47 in)
- Wheelbase: 2,320 mm (91 in)
- Engine: Dino Type 171, 2,417.33 cc (147.5 cu in), 65° V6, naturally aspirated Mid-engine, longitudinally mounted
- Transmission: Ferrari 543 5-speed manual
- Weight: 452 kg (996 lb)
- Fuel: Shell
- Tyres: Dunlop

Competition history
- Notable entrants: Scuderia Ferrari
- Notable drivers: (United States) Richie Ginther
- Debut: 1960 Monaco Grand Prix
Races	Wins	Poles	F/Laps
2	0	0	0
- Constructors' Championships: 0
- Drivers' Championships: 0

The Ferrari 246 P F1 was a Formula One race car prototype used by Ferrari in 1960. It was Ferrari's first mid-engined car.

== Development ==
The disappointing form of the Ferrari 246 in 1959, along with the continuing rise of Cooper and Lotus, finally convinced Enzo Ferrari that the future lay in rear-engine cars. The 246P was developed in secret by a team led by Carlo Chiti. After sorting its tail-heavy weight distribution, it debuted at the 1960 Monaco Grand Prix, retiring on lap 70 with a failed differential, but classified sixth.

== 156 F2 ==
With the new 1.5 litre rules due to come into force in 1961, the 246P was then pressed into service as a development mule for the revised V6 engine, in which guise it could compete in the existing Formula Two class. It made a single World Championship appearance, at the 1960 Italian Grand Prix, finishing fifth, but won the Formula Two Solitude Grand Prix.

== Technical data ==
Technical data	246 P F1	156 F2 0008
Engine:	Mid-mounted 65° 6 cylinder V engine
Cylinder:	2417.3 cm³	1476.6 cm³
Bore x stroke:	85 x 71 mm	73 x 58.8 mm
Compression:	10.0:1	9.8:1
Max power at rpm:	263 hp at 8 600 rpm	185 hp at 9 200 rpm
Valve control:	Double Overhead Camshafts per cylinder bank, 2 valves per cylinder
Carburetor:	3 Weber 42 DCN	3 Weber 38 DCN
Gearbox:	5-speed manual
suspension front:	Double wishbones, coil springs, telescopic dampers and anti-roll bar
suspension rear:	Double wishbones, coil springs and co-axial telescopic dampers
Brakes:	Drum brakes
Chassis & body:	tubular steel
Wheelbase:	232 cm
Dry weight:	452 kg
Dry speed:	280 km/h	250 km/h

== Complete Formula One World Championship results ==
(key)(results in bold indicate pole position, results in italics indicate fastest lap)

Year	Entrant	Engine	Tyres	Drivers	1	2	3	4	5	6	7	8	9	10	Points	WCC
1960	Scuderia Ferrari	Ferrari 171 2.4 V6	**D**		ARG	MON	500	NED	BEL	FRA	GBR	POR	ITA	USA	**26** **(27)***	**3rd***
1960	Scuderia Ferrari	Ferrari 171 2.4 V6	**D**	Richie Ginther		6									**26** **(27)***	**3rd***
1960	Scuderia Ferrari	Ferrari 1.5 V6	**D**	Wolfgang Von Trips									5		**26** **(27)***	**3rd***

* Includes points scored by the Ferrari 246
