= 1961 French Grand Prix =

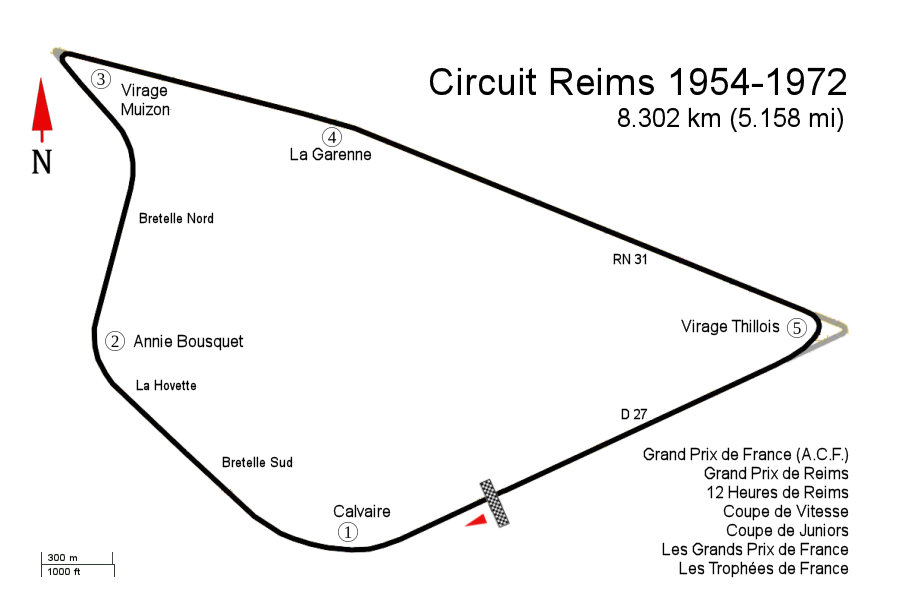

Race details
- Date: 2 July 1961
- Official name: XLVIIe Grand Prix de l'A.C.F.
- Location: Reims; France
- Course: Street circuit/Racing facility
- Course length: 8.302 km (5.158 miles)
- Distance: 52 laps, 431.704 km (268.248 miles)
- Weather: Sunny

Pole position
Driver	(United States) Phil Hill	Ferrari
- Time: 2.24.9

Fastest lap
Driver	(United States) Phil Hill	Ferrari
- Time: 2.27.1 on lap 20

Podium
First	(Italy) Giancarlo Baghetti	Ferrari
Second	(United States) Dan Gurney	Porsche
Third	(United Kingdom) Jim Clark	Lotus-Climax

The 1961 French Grand Prix was a Formula One motor race held on 2 July 1961 at Reims. It was race 4 of 8 in both the 1961 World Championship of Drivers and the 1961 International Cup for Formula One Manufacturers.

By winning the race, Giancarlo Baghetti became only the third driver to win his first World Championship race, the other two being Nino Farina, who won the first World Championship race (the 1950 British Grand Prix) and Johnnie Parsons, who won the 1950 Indianapolis 500 (the Indianapolis 500 was part of the World Championship from 1950 to 1960), though both Farina and Parsons had competed at future World Championship races before the creation of the championship, while this was Baghetti's first start at a major Grand Prix. This was Baghetti's only World Championship race win. He would never finish in the top 3 again.

== Classification ==
=== Qualifying ===
Pos	No	Driver	Constructor	Qualifying times			Gap
Pos	No	Driver	Constructor	Q1	Q2	Q3	Gap
1	16	(United States) Phil Hill	Ferrari	2:24.9	No time	2:30.0	—
2	20	(Germany) Wolfgang von Trips	Ferrari	2:26.4	No time	2:28.7	+1.5
3	18	(United States) Richie Ginther	Ferrari	2:27.4	2:27.0	2:26.8	+1.9
4	26	(United Kingdom) Stirling Moss	Lotus-Climax	2:27.6	2:31.0	2:32.3	+2.7
5	8	(United Kingdom) Jim Clark	Lotus-Climax	2:30.3	2:33.7	2:29.0	+4.1
6	22	(United Kingdom) Graham Hill	BRM-Climax	2:29.1	2:30.4	2:32.0	+4.2
7	40	(United Kingdom) John Surtees	Cooper-Climax	2:33.3	2:32.2	2:29.1	+4.2
8	4	(New Zealand) Bruce McLaren	Cooper-Climax	2:31.3	2:30.4	2:29.4	+4.5
9	12	(United States) Dan Gurney	Porsche	No time	2:31.1	2:29.6	+4.7
10	6	(United Kingdom) Innes Ireland	Lotus-Climax	2:30.2	2:30.5	2:29.8	+4.9
11	24	(United Kingdom) Tony Brooks	BRM-Climax	2:32.3	2:31.6	2:29.9	+5.0
12	50	(Italy) Giancarlo Baghetti	Ferrari	2:30.9	2:30.9	2:30.5	+5.6
13	10	(Sweden) Jo Bonnier	Porsche	No time	No time	2:30.5	+5.6
14	2	(Australia) Jack Brabham	Cooper-Climax	2:31.0	2:33.1	2:33.0	+6.1
15	42	(United Kingdom) Roy Salvadori	Cooper-Climax	2:31.2	2:31.3	2:35.3	+6.3
16	36	(United States) Masten Gregory	Cooper-Climax	2:31.9	2:31.3	2:33.0	+6.4
17	14	(Netherlands) Carel Godin de Beaufort	Porsche	No time	2:33.2	2:31.8	+6.9
18	44	(United Kingdom) Jackie Lewis	Cooper-Climax	2:33.0	2:32.0	No time	+7.1
19	28	(Belgium) Lucien Bianchi	Lotus-Climax	2:33.8†	2:33.4	2:34.2	+8.5
20	48	(Belgium) Willy Mairesse	Lotus-Climax	No time	No time	2:35.8	+10.9
21	52	(France) Bernard Collomb	Cooper-Climax	2:39.1	No time	2:36.8	+11.9
22	46	(Switzerland) Michael May	Lotus-Climax	No time	2:40.2	2:37.9	+13.0
23	32	(France) Maurice Trintignant	Cooper-Maserati	No time	2:38.8	No time	+13.9
24	38	(United Kingdom) Ian Burgess	Lotus-Climax	2:44.7	2:40.9	2:39.7	+14.8
25	30	(United Kingdom) Henry Taylor	Lotus-Climax	No time†	3:14.2	2:40.3	+15.4
26	34	(Italy) Giorgio Scarlatti	De Tomaso-Osca	No time	2:47.3	2:47.1	+22.2

† Bianchi was absent for the first day of qualifying. Taylor qualified on Day 1 with Bianchi's car, but French timekeepers only tied the laptimes of a given car to the driver listed alongside in the programme, and his laptime was attributed to Bianchi.

=== Race ===
Pos	No	Driver	Constructor	Laps	Time/Retired	Grid	Points
1	50	(Italy) Giancarlo Baghetti	Ferrari	52	2:14:17.5	12	9
2	12	(United States) Dan Gurney	Porsche	52	+0.1	5	6
3	8	(United Kingdom) Jim Clark	Lotus-Climax	52	+1:01.0	9	4
4	6	(United Kingdom) Innes Ireland	Lotus-Climax	52	+1:10.3	10	3
5	4	(New Zealand) Bruce McLaren	Cooper-Climax	52	+1:41.8	8	2
6	22	(United Kingdom) Graham Hill	BRM-Climax	52	+1:41.9	6	1
7	10	(Sweden) Jo Bonnier	Porsche	52	+3:15.4	13	
8	42	(United Kingdom) Roy Salvadori	Cooper-Climax	51	+1 Lap	15	
9	16	(United States) Phil Hill	Ferrari	50	+2 Laps	1	
10	30	(United Kingdom) Henry Taylor	Lotus-Climax	49	+3 Laps	25	
11	46	(Switzerland) Michael May	Lotus-Climax	48	+4 Laps	22	
12	36	(United States) Masten Gregory	Cooper-Climax	43	+9 Laps	16	
13	32	(France) Maurice Trintignant	Cooper-Maserati	42	+10 Laps	23	
14	38	(United Kingdom) Ian Burgess	Lotus-Climax	42	+10 Laps	24	
15	18	(United States) Richie Ginther	Ferrari	40	Oil Pressure	3	
Ret	26	(United Kingdom) Stirling Moss	Lotus-Climax	31	Brakes	4	
Ret	48	(Belgium) Willy Mairesse	Lotus-Climax	27	Engine	20	
Ret	14	(Netherlands) Carel Godin de Beaufort	Porsche	23	Overheating	17	
Ret	28	(Belgium) Lucien Bianchi	Lotus-Climax	21	Overheating	19	
Ret	20	(Germany) Wolfgang von Trips	Ferrari	18	Engine	2	
Ret	34	(Italy) Giorgio Scarlatti	De Tomaso-Osca	15	Engine	26	
Ret	2	(Australia) Jack Brabham	Cooper-Climax	14	Oil Pressure	14	
Ret	52	(France) Bernard Collomb	Cooper-Climax	6	Engine	21	
Ret	40	(United Kingdom) John Surtees	Cooper-Climax	4	Accident	7	
Ret	24	(United Kingdom) Tony Brooks	BRM-Climax	4	Overheating	11	
Ret	44	(United Kingdom) Jackie Lewis	Cooper-Climax	4	Overheating	18	
DNS	46	(Germany) Wolfgang Seidel	Lotus-Climax		Practice only - May's car		
DNS	28	(Argentina) Juan Manuel Bordeu	Lotus-Climax		Practice only - UDT Laystall T-car		
WD	46	(Belgium) Olivier Gendebien	Emeryson-Maserati		Entry taken by May		
WD	14	(Germany) Hans Herrmann	Porsche		Car taken by de Beaufort		
DNA	54	(United Kingdom) Brian Naylor	JBW-Climax		Car not ready		

== Notes ==
- This was the first Formula One World Championship podium for Porsche as a constructor and engine supplier.

== Championship standings after the race ==
Drivers' Championship standings

	Pos	Driver	Points
	1	(United States) Phil Hill	19
	2	(Germany) Wolfgang von Trips	18
	3	(United Kingdom) Stirling Moss	12
	4	(United States) Richie Ginther	12
25	5	(Italy) Giancarlo Baghetti	9

Constructors' Championship standings

	Pos	Constructor	Points
	1	(Italy) Ferrari	30
	2	(United Kingdom) Lotus-Climax	16
1	3	(Germany) Porsche	9
1	4	(United Kingdom) Cooper-Climax	6
1	5	(United Kingdom) BRM-Climax	1

- Notes: Only the top five positions are included for both sets of standings.

Previous race: 1961 Belgian Grand Prix	FIA Formula One World Championship; 1961 season	Next race: 1961 British Grand Prix
Previous race: 1960 French Grand Prix	French Grand Prix	Next race: 1962 French Grand Prix
