= 1960 Campionato Italiano season =

1960 Campionato Italiano

Seasons
- ← 1959 1961 →

The 1960 Campionato Italiano was the 3rd season of the Campionato Italiano. Renato Pirocchi won this championship. Many rounds were run in conjunction 1960 Campionato A.N.P.E.C./Auto Italiana (Auto Italiana's World Car Trophy ANPEC), which saw Colin Davis win the title.

== Campionato Italiano ==
Champion: (Italy) Renato Pirocchi

Runner Up: (Italy) Roberto Lippi

=== Results ===
| Date | Round | Circuit | Winning driver | Winning team | Winning car |
|---|---|---|---|---|---|
| 10/04 | Rd. 1 | (Italy) Vallelunga | (Italy) Antonio Maglione | Antonio Maglione | de Sanctis-Fiat |
| 17/04 | Rd. 2 | (Italy) Cesenatico | (United States) Carroll Smith | Carroll Smith | Cooper-BMC T52 |
| 25/04 | Rd. 3 | (Italy) Monza | (Italy) Giancarlo Baghetti | Scuderia Sant’Ambroeus | Dagrada-Lancia |
| 05/06 | Rd. 4 | (Italy) Teramo | (Italy) Renato Pirocchi | Scuderia Pescara | Stanguellini-Fiat |
| 19/06 | Rd. 5 | (Italy) Caserta | (Italy) Berardo Taraschi | Scuderia Taraschi | Taraschi-Fiat |
| 29/06 | Rd. 6 | (Italy) Monza | (United Kingdom) Colin Davis | Scuderia Serenissima | OSAC-Fiat |
| 24/07 | Rd. 7 | (Italy) Salerno | (United Kingdom) Colin Davis | Scuderia Serenissima | OSAC-Fiat |
| 31/07 | Rd. 8 | (Italy) Messina | (United Kingdom) Colin Davis | Scuderia Serenissima | OSAC-Fiat |
| 09/10 | Rd. 9 | (Italy) Modena | (Italy) Corrado Manfredini | Scuderia Madunina | Wainer-Fiat |
| 23/10 | Rd. 10 | (Italy) Siracusa | (United Kingdom) Colin Davis | Scuderia Serenissima | OSAC-Fiat |

=== Table ===
| Place | Driver | Pts. |
|---|---|---|
| 1 | (Italy) Renato Pirocchi | 40 |
| 2 | (Italy) Roberto Lippi | 25 |
| 3 | (Italy) Antonio Maglione | 20 |
| 4= | (Italy) ”Geki” | 14 |
| 4= | (Italy) Giancarlo Baghetti | 14 |
| 6 | (Italy) Lorenzo Bandini | 12 |
| 7 | (Italy) Menato Boffa | 10 |
| 8= | (Italy) Lucio de Sanctis | 8 |
| 8= | (Italy) Corrado Manfredini | 8 |
| 10 | (Italy) Franco Dari | 7 |
| 11= | (Italy) Giorgio Cecchini | 6 |
| 11= | (Italy) Carlo Peroglio | 6 |
| 11= | (Italy) Carmelo Genovese | 6 |
| 14 | (Italy) Agostino Zanetti | 5 |
| 15= | (Italy) Mario Ciarelli | 4 |
| 15= | (Italy) Dalmazio Calvi | 4 |
| 17= | (Italy) Carlo Facetti | 3 |
| 17= | (Italy) Raffaele Fiordelisi | 3 |
| 17= | (Italy) Leandro Terra | 3 |
| 20= | (Italy) Antonio Laurent | 2 |
| 20= | (Italy) Romano Orsola | 2 |
| 20= | (Italy) Norberto Bagnalasta | 2 |
| 20= | (Italy) Giorgio Bassi | 2 |

== Campionato A.N.P.E.C./Auto Italiana ==
Champion: (United Kingdom) Colin Davis

Runner Up: (France) Jacques Calès

=== Results ===
| Date | Round | Circuit | Winning driver | Winning team | Winning car |
|---|---|---|---|---|---|
| 24/02 | Rd. 1 Leg 1 | (Cuba) Habana | (Italy) Renato Pirocchi | Scuderia Pescara | Stanguellini-Fiat |
| 28/02 | Rd. 1 Leg 2 | (Cuba) Habana | (Italy) Lorenzo Bandini | Scuderia Madunina | Stanguellini-Fiat |
| 25/04 | Rd. 2 | (Italy) Monza | (Italy) Giancarlo Baghetti | Scuderia Sant’Ambroeus | Dagrada-Lancia |
| 28/05 | Rd. 3 | Monaco | (United Kingdom) Henry Taylor | Ken Tyrrell | Cooper-BMC T52 |
| 12/06 | Rd. 4 | (France) Albi | (United Kingdom) Henry Taylor | Ken Tyrrell | Cooper-BMC T52 |
| 29/06 | Rd. 5 | (Italy) Monza | (United Kingdom) Colin Davis | Scuderia Serenissima | OSAC-Fiat |
| 31/07 | Rd. 6 | (Italy) Messina | (United Kingdom) Colin Davis | Scuderia Serenissima | OSAC-Fiat |
| 15/08 | Rd. 7 | (Italy) Pescara | (New Zealand) Denny Hulme | New Zealand International Grand Prix Team | Cooper-BMC T52 |
| 09/10 | Rd. 8 | (Austria) Alpenflughafen Innsbruck | (Germany) Gerhard Mitter | Autohaus Mitter | Lotus-DKW 18 |
| 09/10 | Rd. 9 | (Italy) Modena | (Italy) Corrado Manfredini | Scuderia Madunina | Wainer-Fiat |
| 23/10 | Rd. 10 | (Italy) Siracusa | (United Kingdom) Colin Davis | Scuderia Serenissima | OSAC-Fiat |

=== Table ===
| Place | Driver | Pts. |
|---|---|---|
| 1 | (United Kingdom) Colin Davis | 76 (81) |
| 2 | (France) Jacques Calès | 41 |
| 3 | (New Zealand) Denny Hulme | 38 |
| 4 | (Italy) Lorenzo Bandini | 37 |
| 5 | (France) Henri Grandsire | 35 |
| 6 | (United Kingdom) Henry Taylor | 32 |
| 7= | (Italy) Giancarlo Baghetti | 28 |
| 7= | (Italy) Renato Pirocchi | 28 |
| 9 | (Argentina) Juan Manuel Bordeu | 26 |
| 10 | (Rhodesia) John Love | 23 |
| 11= | (Italy) Andrea Melarosa | 16 |
| 11= | (Italy) Corrado Manfredini | 16 |
| 11= | (Germany) Gerhard Mitter | 16 |
| 14 | (Italy) ”Geki” | 14 |
| 15 | (Italy) Franco Dari | 13 |
| 16= | (United Kingdom) Ian Raby | 12 |
| 16= | (Italy) Roberto Lippi | 12 |
| 16= | (United Kingdom) Peter Ashdown | 12 |
| 16= | (Germany) Kurt Ahrens Jr. | 12 |
| 20= | (Switzerland) Michel May | 10 |
| 20= | (United Kingdom) Trevor Taylor | 10 |
| 20= | (Austria) Walter Schatz | 10 |
etc.

Sporting positions
| Preceded by (Italy) Renato Cammarota | Campionato Italiano; 1960 | Succeeded by (Italy) ”Geki” |
