= Formula One drivers from Italy =

List of Formula One drivers who competed as Italian

- Drivers: 98
- Grands Prix: 905
- Entries: 3445
- Starts: 3035
- Best season finish: 1st (1950, 1952, 1953, 2026)
- Wins: 52
- Podiums: 226
- Pole positions: 55
- Fastest laps: 62
- Points: 2580.8
- First entry: 1950 British Grand Prix
- First win: 1950 British Grand Prix
- Latest win: 2026 United States Grand Prix
- Latest entry: 2026 São Paulo Grand Prix
- 2026 drivers: Kimi Antonelli

There have been 98 Formula One drivers from Italy who have competed in a World Championship Grand Prix weekend, (Note: A total of 108 Italian drivers were entered for at least one World Championship Grand Prix, of whom 98 competed in a Grand Prix weekend and 84 started at least one race.) including three World Drivers' Champions. Giuseppe "Nino" Farina won the world championship in its inaugural year (1950) and Alberto Ascari was the first double World Champion (winning titles in 1952 and 1953). The first three championships came in the early 1950s, and few Italian drivers came close to the title during the 73-year drought that ended with Kimi Antonelli winning the World Championship in 2026. In each season from 1989 to 1991, there were a record 13 drivers from Italy. Prior to Antonio Giovinazzi in 2017, there were five consecutive seasons without an Italian driver, with 2012 marking the first season an Italian driver did not enter a Formula One race weekend. (Note: Before 2012, 1969 was the only season in which no Italian driver started a World Championship race. Ernesto Brambilla entered the Italian Grand Prix but did not start.) Kimi Antonelli of Mercedes is the only Italian driver competing in 2026, having made his debut in 2025.

== World champions and race winners ==
Three Italian drivers have won the drivers' championship. Giuseppe Farina won the inaugural championship in 1950 driving for Alfa Romeo, Alberto Ascari won consecutive titles in 1952 and 1953 driving for Scuderia Ferrari, and Kimi Antonelli won the 2026 title driving for Mercedes. Mario Andretti, who was born in Italy but is an American citizen, won the 1978 drivers' championship representing the United States.

A total of 16 different Italian drivers have won a race in Formula One, the most recent being Kimi Antonelli in 2026. Only seven drivers from Italy have won more than a single race, Ascari having won most, with 13 victories.

== Current drivers ==
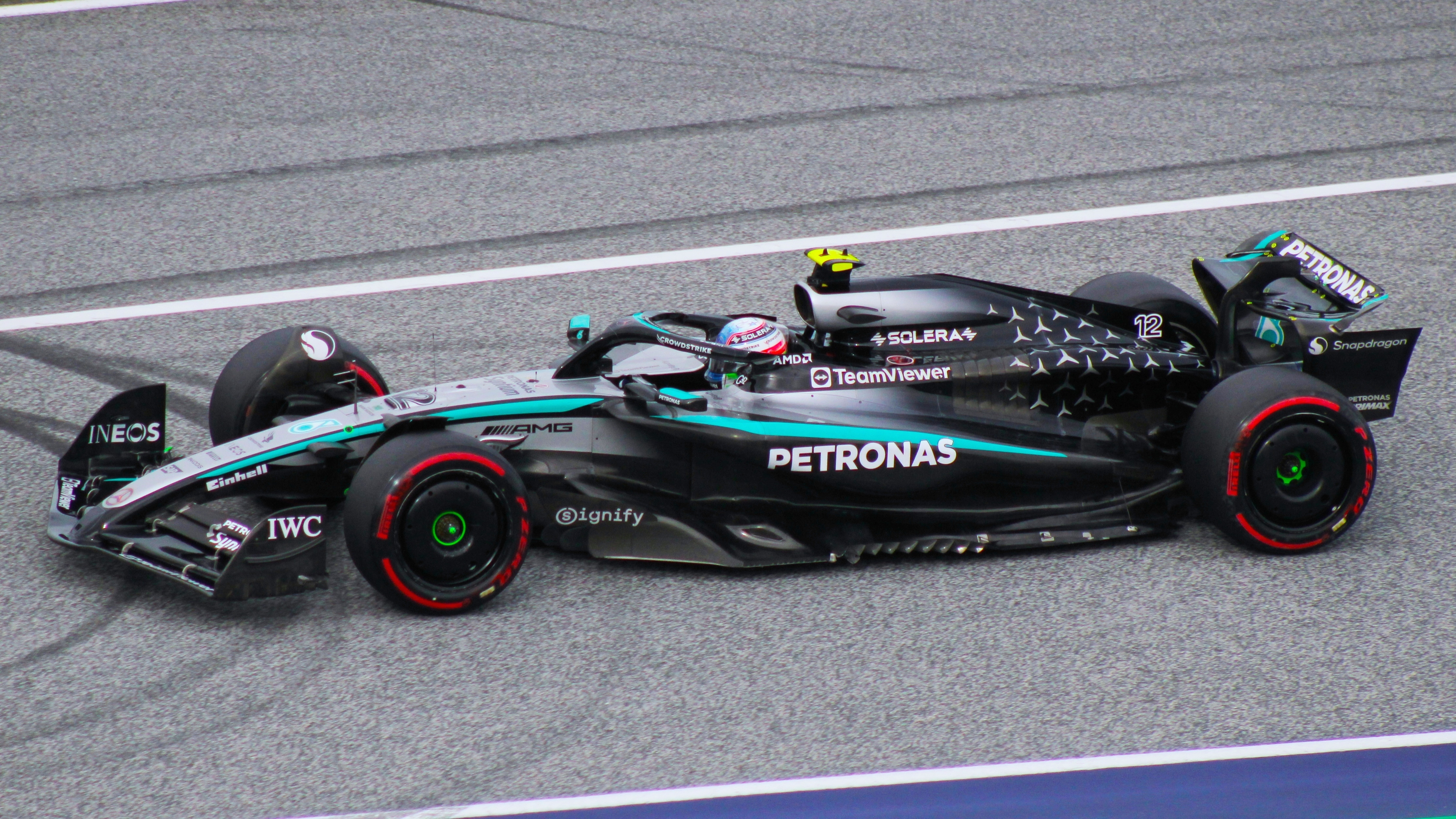
Kimi Antonelli driving for Mercedes at the 2025 Austrian Grand Prix

Kimi Antonelli is the only Italian driver in the 2026 Formula One World Championship, and the most recent Italian Drivers' Champion, securing it at the 2026 Mexico City Grand Prix. Antonelli has achieved 9 wins, 7 pole positions, 11 fastest laps, and 19 podiums from 44 starts.

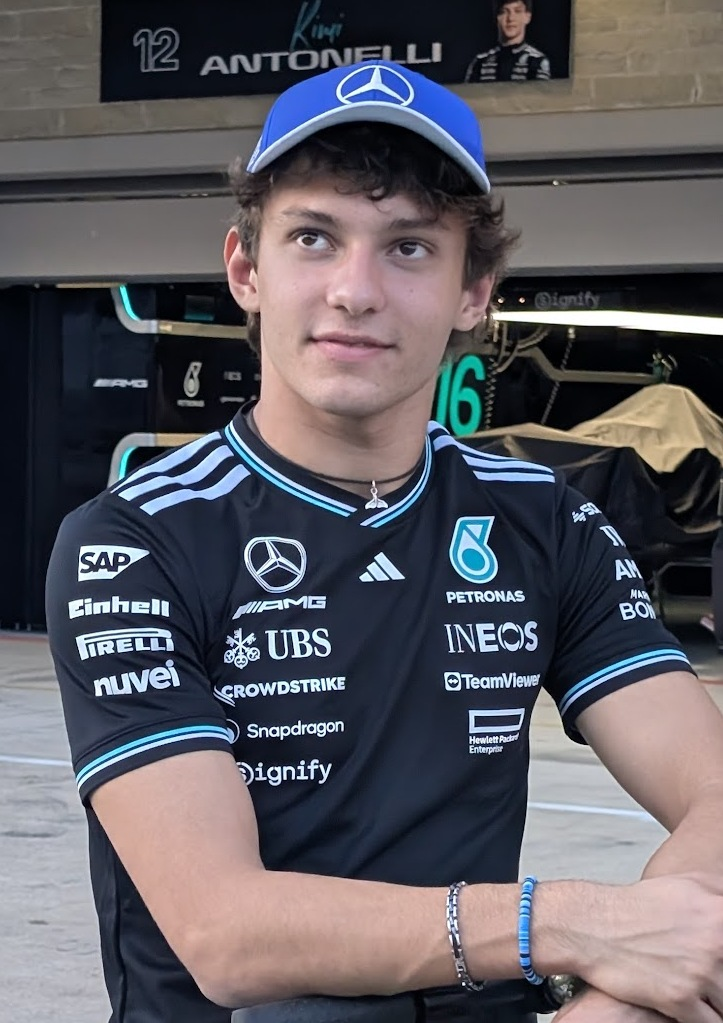
Kimi Antonelli
2026 season position: 1st

== Former drivers ==
=== Notable former drivers ===
Giuseppe "Nino" Farina won the very first World Championship race and title in 1950 in an Alfa Romeo. He won half of the six races that year, more than he would win in the remainder of his career in Formula One. Teammate Juan Manuel Fangio took the title in 1951 with Farina only managing to finish fourth in the championship, but he came much closer with Ferrari the following year. However, he was again beaten by a teammate as Alberto Ascari took the 1952 title. His final race victory came in 1953 and he finished third in the title race but would later suffer a career-threatening crash. In 1954 Farina was driving in a sports car race alongside his F1 career. At the start of a race in Monza his car was engulfed in flames and he suffered serious burns that would mean he turned to amphetamines and morphine to cope with the pain. He returned to Formula One for four races in 1955 and, despite finishing on the podium at all three of the races he started, he felt unable to continue.

Alberto Ascari won the drivers' championship for Ferrari in 1952 and became to first person to retain the title. Across the two seasons he won nine consecutive races, a record still unbeaten 60 years later. Ascari had made his debut with Ferrari in 1950, coming fifth in the championship after contesting just four races. The following year he won two grands prix and was runner-up in the title race. After back-to-back championships with Ferrari in 1952 and 1953 Ascari moved to Lancia but the car was not ready until late in the season leaving him unable to challenge the dominant Juan Manuel Fangio and he ended the year without seeing the chequered flag at a single event. Two races with Lancia in 1955 brought about similar disappointment but Ascari would not manage to see the year out. While testing a Ferrari at Monza he crashed under unexplained circumstances and was killed. He was the last Italian Formula One Drivers' World Champion before Kimi Antonelli won the title in 2026 and the title holder with the fewest ever Grand Prix starts (32).

Michele Alboreto started 194 races in a career that spanned 14 seasons. He started with a drive for Tyrrell in 1981, impressing the team enough to secure a three-year contract. He won two races with them before moving to Ferrari for five seasons. It was with the Italian team that Alboreto would come close to winning the title – eight podium finishes including two wins was not quite enough to give him the 1985 championship and he finished the year as runner-up. On leaving Ferrari Alboreto's career went downhill with only one podium finish in his final six years.

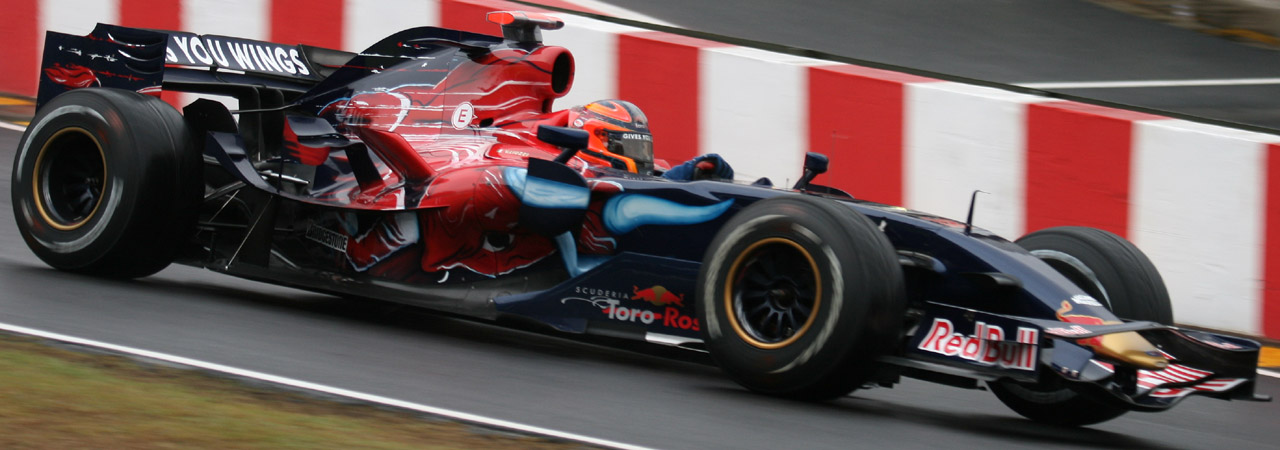
Liuzzi driving for Toro Rosso at the 2007 Brazilian Grand Prix

Four Italian drivers have started more than 200 races, easily more than any other country. Though they had 936 starts between them, the drivers only scored ten victories and 62 other podium finishes.

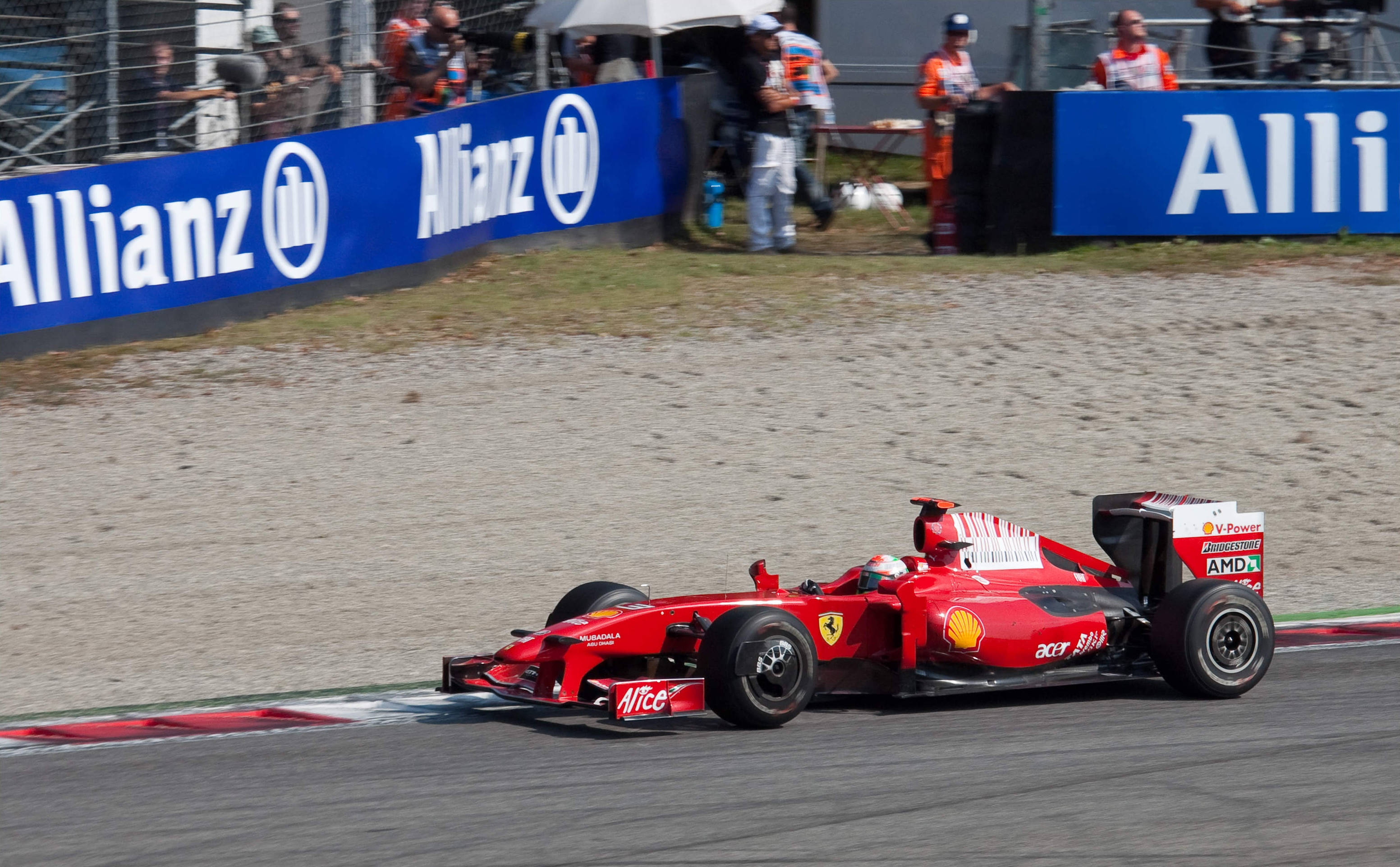
Fisichella driving for Ferrari at the 2009 Italian Grand Prix

Giancarlo Fisichella competed for 14 seasons. He won the 2006 Malaysian Grand Prix, remaining the last Italian driver to win a Formula One Grand Prix for almost 20 years, until Kimi Antonelli's first victory in 2026. It was his third and final victory and came in his most successful season, one which saw him finish the year fourth in the drivers' championship. Fisichella featured on the podium at 19 of the 229 races he started.

Riccardo Patrese competed in Formula One for 17 years, standing on the podium 31 times including six victories. He started 256 races, placing him as one of the top three most experienced Formula One drivers in history, and finished just under half of them. From his 1977 debut to the end of the 1988 season Patrese was only able to finish at best ninth in the championship, but his career rose to new heights with his second year with Williams. He ended the 1989 season third and crossed the finish line in the top three 17 times across 1991 and 1992, finishing third and second in the championship respectively. He left Formula One after the 1993 season to race touring cars.

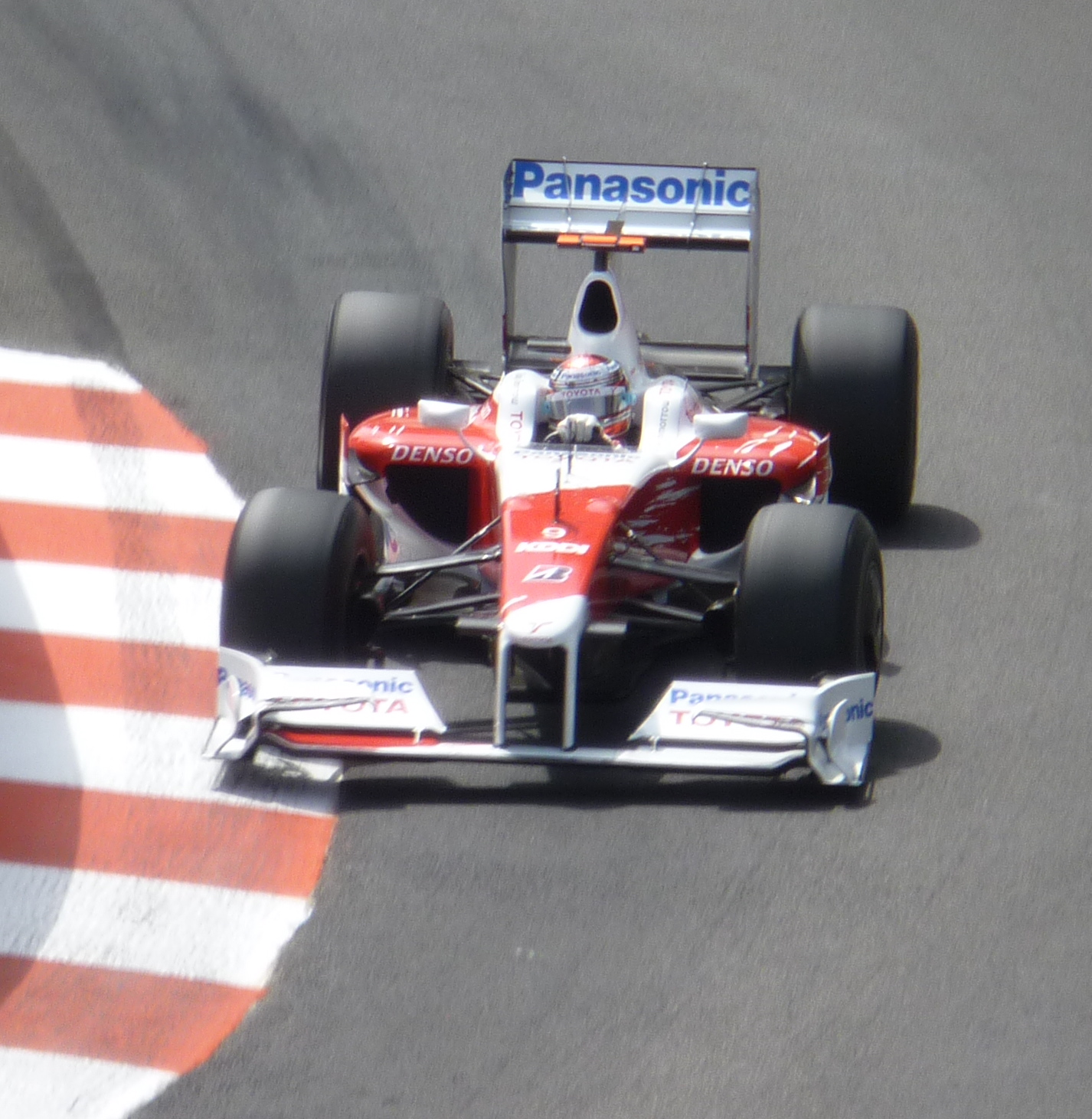
Trulli driving for Toyota at the 2009 Monaco Grand Prix

Jarno Trulli competed at 256 events over 15 seasons from 1997. He started on pole and then won the 2004 Monaco Grand Prix, but was sacked later that year when his relationship with Renault team boss Flavio Briatore broke down. It would prove to be Trulli's highest championship finish with his accrued 46 points giving him sixth place.

Andrea de Cesaris stood on the podium five times out of 208 race starts, and is the driver with the second-most starts to never have won a race. He drove for Alfa Romeo twice in 1980 before securing a full-time drive with McLaren the following year. Never staying with a team for more than two seasons in a row de Cesaris drove for ten different teams in total. Perhaps his worst time in the sport came between 1985 and 1987 when he only finished six of the 42 races he started.

Elio de Angelis scored two wins during a career that spanned eight seasons. He made his debut in 1979 with Shadow before a six-year stint with Lotus. He achieved his best result in 1984 when four podium finishes helped him to third in the title race. He looked to be going better the following year, leading the championship for several races, but a series of poor results put him down to fifth. He moved over to Brabham for the 1986 season but was only able to compete four times before losing his life while testing at Circuit Paul Ricard. He was the last person to die in a Formula One car until the weekend of the 1994 San Marino Grand Prix.

Alessandro Zanardi won two Indy Car championships but was unable to find success in Formula One. He drove in four races across 1991 and 1992 before securing a full-time drive with Lotus in 1993. He finished five races with a best result of sixth before a crash ended his season early. Zanardi returned the following year but did not win a single point and was unable to secure a drive for 1995. On leaving the sport he embarked on a very successful career in Indy Car before returning for one final, and very poor, season in 1999.

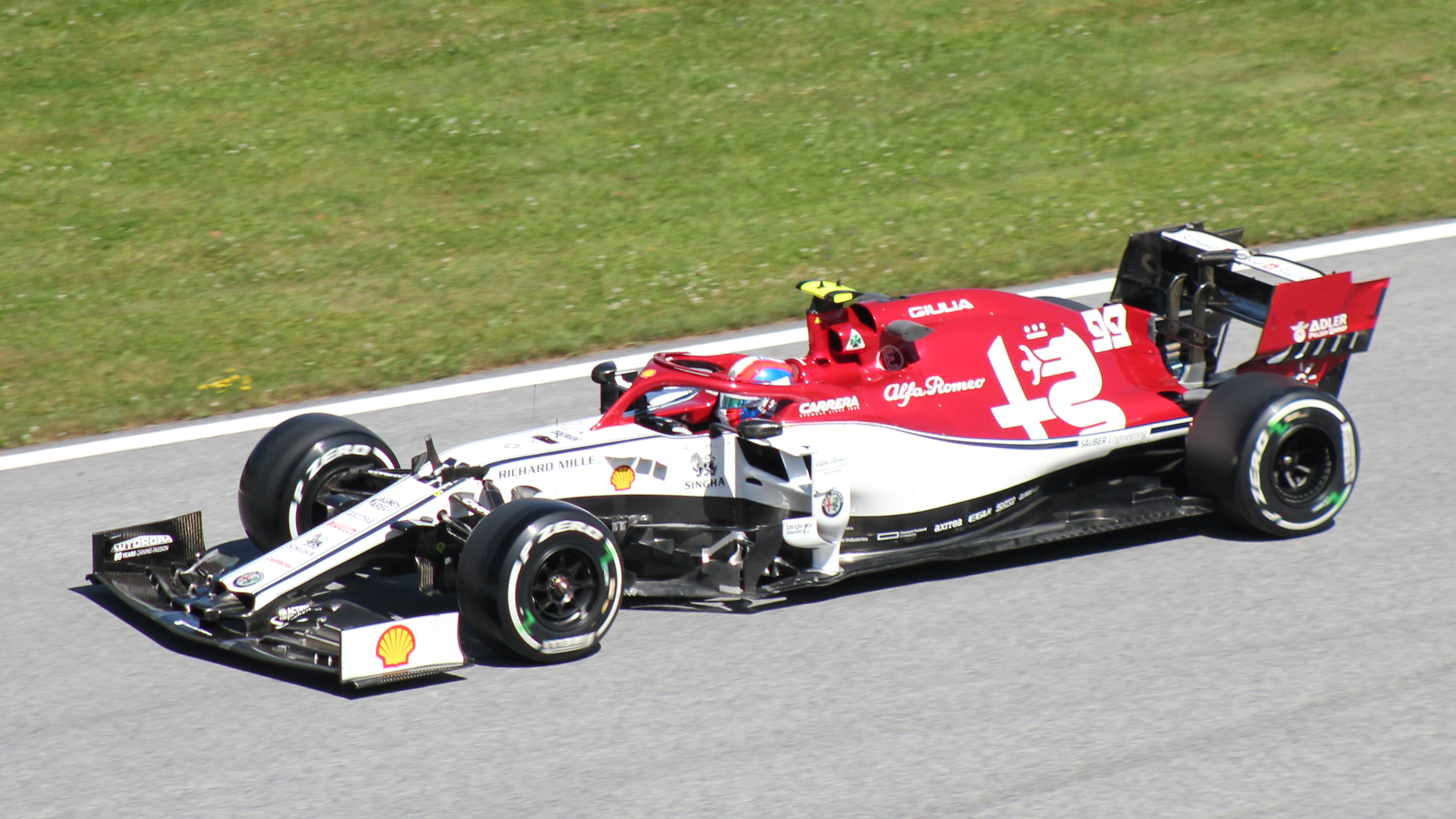
Giovinazzi driving for Alfa Romeo at the 2019 Austrian Grand Prix

Antonio Giovinazzi debuted in Formula 1 in 2017 with Sauber, after Pascal Wehrlein had suffered a back injury at the Race of Champions during pre-season. He finished 12th at the Australian Grand Prix, but crashed from the Chinese Grand Prix. He would not come back to Formula 1 until 2019, with Alfa Romeo, and had three poor seasons, with his 5th place in the 2019 Brazilian Grand Prix as his best result. After leaving Alfa Romeo, he joined Haas as a reserve driver for 2022. However, he left the following year to race at the World Endurance Championship with Ferrari AF Corse. In 2023, alongside his teammates James Calado and Alessandro Pier Guidi, he won the 24 Hours of Le Mans on board the #51 Ferrari 499P, and became world champion two years later.

Maria Teresa de Filippis was an Italian racing driver, and the first woman to race in Formula One. She participated in five World Championship Grands Prix, debuting on 18 May 1958, but scored no championship points. Though her Formula One racing career was brief, she won races in other series and is remembered as a pioneer in the sport. The 1958 Belgian Grand Prix allowed all drivers to compete with no cut-off for a qualifying time. De Filippis qualified in 19th place, nearly 34 seconds off Hawthorn's pole position time and only ahead of a mechanically-hindered Ken Kavanagh. Although she was lapped twice by race winner Tony Brooks in the 24 lap race she managed to finish, albeit in 10th and last place after nine other cars failed to finish. This would prove to be her only race finish.

Lella Lombardi is the only woman to have finished a Formula One race in a points-scoring position. She was first entered for the 1974 British Grand Prix with Brabham but failed to qualify, returning to the sport in 1975 with March. She became the first woman to qualify for a race when she secured a place on the grid at the 1975 South African Grand Prix. Later in the year, at the Spanish Grand Prix, she was running in sixth place when the race was stopped due to an accident involving the Embassy Hill of German driver Rolf Stommelen (which killed four people and left him, the driver himself, seriously injured—forcing him to take a temporary leave from the category). With the race not yet halfway through half points were awarded and Lombardi was awarded half a championship point. She was unable to win any further points and neither has any other female driver since.

== Driver statistics ==
Drivers	Active Years	Entries	Wins	Podiums	Career Points	Poles	Fastest Laps	Championships
Alberto Ascari	1950–1955	33 (32 starts)	13	17	107 9/14 (140 1/7)	14	12	2 (1952, 1953)
Felice Bonetto	1950–1953	16 (15 starts)	0	2	17.5	0	0	-
Franco Comotti	1950, 1952	2	0	0	0	0	0	-
Clemente Biondetti	1950	1	0	0	0	0	0	-
Luigi Fagioli	1950–1951	7	1	6	28 (32)	0	0	-
Nino Farina	1950–1956	35 (33 starts)	5	20	115 1/3 (127 1/3)	5	5	1 (1950)
Nello Pagani	1950	1	0	0	0	0	0	-
Franco Rol	1950-1952	5	0	0	3	0	0	-
Consalvo Sanesi	1950-1951	5	0	1	3	0	0	-
Dorino Serafini	1950	1	0	1	6	0	0	-
Piero Taruffi	1950–1952, 1954–1956	18	1	5	41	0	1	-
Luigi Villoresi	1950–1956	34 (31 starts)	0	8	46 (49)	0	1	-
Piero Carini	1952-1953	3 (3 starts)	0	0	4	0	0	-
Piero Dusio	1952	1 (0 starts)	0	0	0	0	0	-
Umberto Maglioli	1953–1957	10	0	2	3 1/3	0	0	-
Sergio Mantovani	1953–1955	8 (7 starts)	0	0	4	0	0	-
Luigi Musso	1953–1958	25 (24 starts)	1	7	44	0	1	-
Giovanni de Riu	1954	1 (0 starts)	0	0	0	0	0	-
Cesare Perdisa	1955-1957	8 (7 starts)	0	2	5	0	0	-
Eugenio Castellotti	1955–1957	14	0	3	19.5	1	0	-
Luigi Piotti	1955-1958	9 (5 starts)	0	0	0	0	0	-
Gerino Gerini	1956, 1958	7 (6 starts)	0	0	1.5	0	0	-
Giorgio Scarlatti	1956–1961	15 (12 starts)	0	0	1	0	0	-
Piero Scotti	1956	1	0	0	0	0	0	-
Giulio Cabianca	1958-1960	4 (3 starts)	0	0	0	0	0	-
Luigi Taramazzo	1958	1 (0 starts)	0	0	0	0	0	-
Maria Teresa de Filippis	1958-1959	5 (3 starts)	0	0	0	0	0	-
Gino Munaron	1960	4	0	0	0	0	0	-
Piero Drogo	1960	1	0	0	0	0	0	-
Gaetano Starrabba	1961	1	0	0	0	0	0	-
Giancarlo Baghetti	1961–1967	21	1	1	14	0	1	-
Lorenzo Bandini	1961–1967	42	1	8	58	1	2	-
Massimo Natili	1961	2 (1 start)	0	0	0	0	0	-
Nino Vaccarella	1961-1962, 1965	5 (4 starts)	0	0	0	0	0	-
Renato Pirocchi	1961	1	0	0	0	0	0	-
Roberto Bussinello	1961, 1965	3 (2 starts)	0	0	0	0	0	-
Roberto Lippi	1961-1963	3 (1 start)	0	0	0	0	0	-
Ernesto Prinoth	1962	1 (0 starts)	0	0	0	0	0	-
Ernesto Brambilla	1963, 1969	2 (0 starts)	0	0	0	0	0	-
Ludovico Scarfiotti	1963–1968	12 (10 starts)	1	1	17	0	1	-
Geki	1964-1966	3 (2 starts)	0	0	0	0	0	-
Giorgio Bassi	1965	1	0	0	0	0	0	-
Andrea de Adamich	1968, 1970–1973	36 (30 starts)	0	0	6	0	0	-
Ignazio Giunti	1970	4	0	0	3	0	0	-
Nanni Galli	1970–1973	20 (17 starts)	0	0	0	0	0	-
Arturo Merzario	1972–1979	85 (57 starts)	0	0	11	0	0	-
Carlo Facetti	1974	1 (0 starts)	0	0	0	0	0	-
Lella Lombardi	1974–1976	17 (12 starts)	0	0	0.5	0	0	-
Vittorio Brambilla	1974–1980	79 (74 starts)	1	1	15.5	1	1	-
Renzo Zorzi	1975-1977	7	0	0	1	0	0	-
Alessandro Pesenti-Rossi	1976	4 (3 starts)	0	0	0	0	0	-
Bruno Giacomelli	1977–1983, 1990	82 (69 starts)	0	1	14	1	0	-
Giorgio Francia	1977, 1981	2 (0 starts)	0	0	0	0	0	-
Lamberto Leoni	1977-1978	5 (1 start)	0	0	0	0	0	-
Riccardo Patrese	1977–1993	257 (256 starts)	6	37	281	8	13	-
Alberto Colombo	1978	3 (0 starts)	0	0	0	0	0	-
Beppe Gabbiani	1978, 1981	17 (3 starts)	0	0	0	0	0	-
Gimax	1978	1 (0 starts)	0	0	0	0	0	-
Elio de Angelis	1979–1986	109 (108 starts)	2	9	122	3	0	-
Gianfranco Brancatelli	1979	3 (0 starts)	0	0	0	0	0	-
Andrea de Cesaris	1980–1994	214 (208 starts)	0	5	59	1	1	-
Michele Alboreto	1981–1994	215 (194 starts)	5	23	186.5	2	5	-
Piercarlo Ghinzani	1981, 1983–1989	111 (74 starts)	0	0	2	0	0	-
Siegfried Stohr	1981	13 (9 starts)	0	0	0	0	0	-
Mauro Baldi	1982–1985	41 (36 starts)	0	0	5	0	0	-
Riccardo Paletti	1982	8 (2 starts)	0	0	0	0	0	-
Teo Fabi	1982, 1984–1987	71 (64 starts)	0	2	23	3	2	-
Corrado Fabi	1983–1984	18 (12 starts)	0	0	0	0	0	-
Pierluigi Martini	1984–1985, 1988–1995	124 (118 starts)	0	0	18	0	0	-
Ivan Capelli	1985–1993	98 (93 starts)	0	3	31	0	0	-
Alex Caffi	1986–1992	77 (56 starts)	0	0	6	0	0	-
Alessandro Nannini	1986–1990	78 (76 starts)	1	9	65	0	2	-
Nicola Larini	1987–1992, 1994, 1997	75 (49 starts)	0	1	7	0	0	-
Stefano Modena	1987–1992	81 (70 starts)	0	2	17	0	0	-
Gabriele Tarquini	1987–1992, 1995	78 (38 starts)	0	0	1	0	0	-
Enrico Bertaggia	1989, 1992	8 (0 starts)	0	0	0	0	0	-
Emanuele Pirro	1989–1991	40 (37 starts)	0	0	3	0	0	-
Paolo Barilla	1989-1990	15 (9 starts)	0	0	0	0	0	-
Claudio Langes	1990	14 (0 starts)	0	0	0	0	0	-
Gianni Morbidelli	1990–1992, 1994–1995, 1997	70 (67 starts)	0	1	8.5	0	0	-
Alessandro Zanardi	1991–1994, 1999	44 (41 starts)	0	0	1	0	0	-
Fabrizio Barbazza	1991, 1993	20 (8 starts)	0	0	2	0	0	-
Emanuele Naspetti	1992-1993	6	0	0	0	0	0	-
Giovanna Amati	1992	3 (0 starts)	0	0	0	0	0	-
Luca Badoer	1993, 1995–1996, 1999, 2009	58 (50 starts)	0	0	0	0	0	-
Marco Apicella	1993	1	0	0	0	0	0	-
Andrea Montermini	1994–1996	29 (20 starts)	0	0	0	0	0	-
Domenico Schiattarella	1994-1995	7 (6 starts)	0	0	0	0	0	-
Massimiliano Papis	1995	7	0	0	0	0	0	-
Giovanni Lavaggi	1995–1996	10 (7 starts)	0	0	0	0	0	-
Giancarlo Fisichella	1996–2009	231 (229 starts)	3	19	275	4	2	-
Jarno Trulli	1997–2011	256 (252 starts)	1	11	246.5	4	1	-
Vincenzo Sospiri	1997	1 (0 starts)	0	0	0	0	0	-
Gianmaria Bruni	2004	18	0	0	0	0	0	-
Giorgio Pantano	2004	14	0	0	0	0	0	-
Vitantonio Liuzzi	2005–2007, 2009–2011	81 (80 starts)	0	0	26	0	0	-
Antonio Giovinazzi	2017, 2019–2021	62	0	0	21	0	0	-
Kimi Antonelli	2025–present	44	9	19	540	7	11	1 (2026)

== See also ==
- List of Formula One Grand Prix winners
