= List of 1960 motorsport champions =

1960 motorsport champions
Previous: 1959	Next: 1961

This list of 1960 motorsport champions is a list of national or international auto racing series with a Championship decided by the points or positions earned by a driver from multiple races.

Some titles may be from single events.

== Motorcycle racing ==
Series	Rider	refer
500cc World Championship	(United Kingdom) John Surtees	1960 Grand Prix motorcycle racing season
350cc World Championship	(United Kingdom) John Surtees	1960 Grand Prix motorcycle racing season
250cc World Championship	(Italy) Carlo Ubbiali	1960 Grand Prix motorcycle racing season
125cc World Championship	(Italy) Carlo Ubbiali	1960 Grand Prix motorcycle racing season
Motocross World Championship	500cc: (Sweden) Bill Nilsson	1960 Motocross World Championship
Motocross World Championship	250cc: (United Kingdom) Dave Bickers	1960 Motocross World Championship
Speedway World Championship	(Sweden) Ove Fundin	1960 Individual Speedway World Championship

== Open wheel racing ==
Series	Driver	refer
Formula One World Championship	(Australia) Jack Brabham	1960 Formula One season
Formula One World Championship	Constructors: (United Kingdom) Cooper-Climax	1960 Formula One season
Australian Drivers' Championship	(Australia) Alec Mildren	1960 Australian Drivers' Championship
Campionato Italiano	(Italy) Renato Pirocchi	1960 Campionato Italiano season
Campionato Italiano	Teams: (Italy) Scuderia Pescara	1960 Campionato Italiano season
East German Formula Junior Championship	(East Germany) Heinz Melkus	1960 East German Formula Junior Championship
South African Formula One Championship	(South Africa) Syd van der Vyver	1960 South African Formula One Championship
USAC National Championship	(United States) A. J. Foyt	1960 USAC Championship Car season
Formula Three
John Davy Formula Junior (British F3)	(United Kingdom) Jim Clark	1960 British Formula Three Championship
BRSCC Formula Junior (British F3)	(United Kingdom) Jack Pitcher	1960 British Formula Three Championship
Motor Racing Formula Junior (British F3)	(United Kingdom) Jim Clark (United Kingdom) Trevor Taylor	1960 British Formula Three Championship
Finnish Formula Three Championship	(Finland) Heimo Hietarinta	1960 Finnish Formula Three Championship
Soviet Formula 3 Championship	(Soviet Union) Georgy Surguchev	1960 Soviet Formula 3 Championship

== Rallying ==
Series	Drivers	Season article
British Rally Championship	(United Kingdom) Bill Bengry	1960 British Rally Championship
British Rally Championship	Co-Drivers: (United Kingdom) David Skeffington	1960 British Rally Championship
Canadian Rally Championship	(Canada) Art Dempsey	1960 Canadian Rally Championship
Canadian Rally Championship	Co-Drivers: (Canada) Bill A. Silvera	1960 Canadian Rally Championship
Estonian Rally Championship	(Estonian Soviet Socialist Republic) Valdo Mägi	1960 Estonian Rally Championship
Estonian Rally Championship	Co-Drivers: (Estonian Soviet Socialist Republic) Mihkel Tartlain	1960 Estonian Rally Championship
European Rally Championship	(Germany) Walter Schock	1960 European Rally Championship
European Rally Championship	Co-Drivers: (Germany) Rolf Moll	1960 European Rally Championship
European Rally Championship	Ladies: (United Kingdom) Pat Moss	1960 European Rally Championship
Finnish Rally Championship	(Finland) Carl-Otto Bremer	1960 Finnish Rally Championship
South African National Rally Championship	(South Africa) Ewold van Bergen	
South African National Rally Championship	Co-Drivers: (South Africa) Alan van Niekerk	
Spanish Rally Championship	(Spain) Víctor Sagi	
Spanish Rally Championship	Co-Drivers: (Spain) Antonio Agramunt	

== Sports car and GT ==
Series	Champion	Season article
World Sportscar Championship	(Italy) Ferrari	1960 World Sportscar Championship
USAC Road Racing Championship	(United States) Carroll Shelby	1960 USAC Road Racing Championship
SCCA National Sports Car Championship	B Modified: (United States) Augie Pabst	1960 SCCA National Sports Car Championship
SCCA National Sports Car Championship	D Modified: (Switzerland) Gaston Andrey	1960 SCCA National Sports Car Championship
SCCA National Sports Car Championship	E Modified: (United States) Bob Holbert	1960 SCCA National Sports Car Championship
Australian GT Championship	(Australia) Leo Geoghegan	1960 Australian GT Championship

== Stock car racing ==
Series	Driver	Season article
NASCAR Grand National Series	(United States) Rex White	1960 NASCAR Grand National Series
NASCAR Grand National Series	Manufacturers: (United States) Chevrolet	1960 NASCAR Grand National Series
NASCAR Pacific Coast Late Model Series	(United States) Marvin Porter	1960 NASCAR Pacific Coast Late Model Series
ARCA Racing Series	(United States) Nelson Stacy	1960 ARCA Racing Series
Turismo Carretera	(Argentina) Juan Gálvez	1960 Turismo Carretera
USAC Stock Car National Championship	(United States) Norm Nelson	1960 USAC Stock Car National Championship

== Touring car ==
Series	Driver	refer
Australian Touring Car Championship	(Australia) David McKay	1960 Australian Touring Car Championship
British Saloon Car Championship	(United Kingdom) Doc Shepherd	1960 British Saloon Car Championship

== See also ==
- List of motorsport championships
- Auto racing
