= 1961 Naples Grand Prix =

- Non-championship race in the 1961 Formula One season
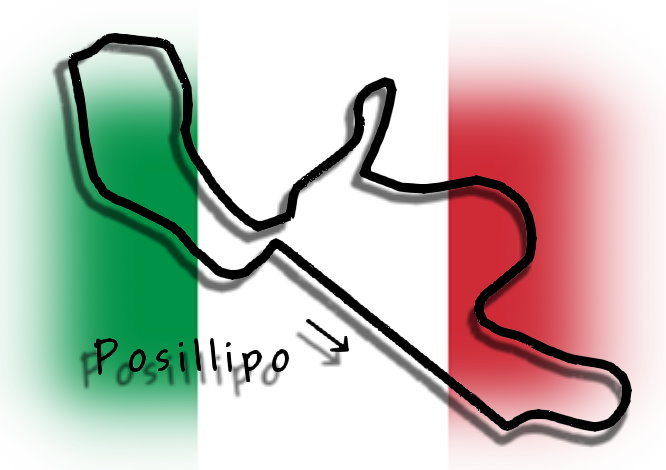

Race details
- Date: 14 May 1961
- Official name: XIX Gran Premio di Napoli
- Location: Posillipo Circuit, Posillipo, Naples
- Course: Street circuit
- Course length: 2.491 km (1.548 miles)
- Distance: 60 laps, 149.444 km (92.86 miles)

Pole position
Driver	(United Kingdom) Gerry Ashmore	Lotus-Climax
- Time: 1:21.3

Fastest lap
Driver	(Italy) Giancarlo Baghetti	Ferrari
- Time: 1:20.2

Podium
First	(Italy) Giancarlo Baghetti	Ferrari
Second	(United Kingdom) Gerry Ashmore	Lotus-Climax
Third	(Italy) Lorenzo Bandini	Cooper-Maserati

The 19th Naples Grand Prix was a motor race, run to Formula One rules, held on 14 May 1961 at Posillipo Circuit, Naples. The race was run over 60 laps of the circuit, and was won by Italian driver Giancarlo Baghetti in a Ferrari 156 in only his second Formula One race, having also won his first. Baghetti went on to win his next Formula One race as well, his first World Championship race, and is the only driver to have won his first three Formula One races run.

This race was held on the same day as the 1961 Monaco Grand Prix, therefore very few of the top drivers of the day were in action in Naples. Baghetti took a comfortable victory despite only starting third on the grid, with pole-sitter Gerry Ashmore finishing second after the other main challenger and early leader Roy Salvadori suffered a puncture. Lorenzo Bandini had led for a lap before Baghetti took over on lap 4, and he held the lead until the chequered flag.

== Qualifying ==
Pos	No.	Driver	Constructor	Lap	Gap
1	10	(United Kingdom) Gerry Ashmore	Lotus-Climax	1:21.3	—
2	18	(United Kingdom) Roy Salvadori	Cooper-Climax	1:21.3	+0.0
3	32	(Italy) Giancarlo Baghetti	Ferrari	1:21.9	+0.6
4	34	(Italy) Lorenzo Bandini	Cooper-Maserati	1:22.5	+1.2
5	30	(United Kingdom) Ian Burgess	Lotus-Climax	1:22.7	+1.4
6	40	(Italy) Ernesto Prinoth	Lotus-Climax	1:23.0	+1.7
7	36	(Italy) Menato Boffa	Cooper-Climax	1:23.2	+1.9
8	22	(Italy) Giovanni Alberti	De Tomaso-O.S.C.A.	1:24.4	+3.1
9	2	(United Kingdom) John Campbell-Jones	Cooper-Climax	1:24.5	+3.2
10	26	(France) Bernard Collomb	Cooper-Climax	1:24.6	+3.3
11	28	(Italy) Roberto Bussinello	De Tomaso-O.S.C.A.	1:25.1	+3.8
12	8	(United Kingdom) Tim Parnell	Lotus-Climax	1:25.2	+3.9
13	14	(United Kingdom) Keith Greene	Gilby-Climax	1:25.2	+3.9
14	38	(Italy) Massimo Natili	Cooper-Maserati	1:25.3	+4.0
15	12	(Italy) Renato Pirocchi	Cooper-Climax	1:25.8	+4.5
16	6	(Belgium) André Pilette	Emeryson-Climax	1:27.1	+5.8
17	16	(Switzerland) "Wal Ever"	Cooper-O.S.C.A.	1:27.2	+5.9
18	20	(Italy) Giuseppe Maugeri	Cooper-Climax	1:27.6	+6.3
19	4	(France) François Santé	Cooper-Climax	2:22.9	+1:01.6

== Results ==
Pos	No.	Driver	Entrant	Constructor	Time/Retired	Grid
1	32	(Italy) Giancarlo Baghetti	FISA	Ferrari	1.22:46.5	3
2	10	(United Kingdom) Gerry Ashmore	Tim Parnell	Lotus-Climax	59 laps	1
3	34	(Italy) Lorenzo Bandini	Scuderia Centro Sud	Cooper-Maserati	59 laps	4
4	30	(United Kingdom) Ian Burgess	Camoradi International	Lotus-Climax	58 laps	6
5	28	(Italy) Roberto Bussinello	Isobele de Tomaso	De Tomaso-O.S.C.A.	56 laps	11
6	26	(France) Bernard Collomb	Bernard Collomb	Cooper-Climax	56 laps	10
7	18	(United Kingdom) Roy Salvadori	Yeoman Credit Racing Team	Cooper-Climax	56 laps	2
8	8	(United Kingdom) Tim Parnell	Tim Parnell	Lotus-Climax	54 laps	12
9	40	(Italy) Ernesto Prinoth	Scuderia Dolomiti	Lotus-Climax	34 laps	6
Ret	22	(Italy) Giovanni Alberti	Scuderia Settecolli	De Tomaso-O.S.C.A.	Unknown - 36 laps	8
Ret	14	(United Kingdom) Keith Greene	Gilby Engineering	Gilby-Climax	Accident - 5 laps	13
Ret	36	(Italy) Menato Boffa	Menato Boffa	Cooper-Climax	Accident - 5 laps	16
Ret	2	(United Kingdom) John Campbell-Jones	John Campbell-Jones	Cooper-Climax	Ignition - 1 lap	9
DNQ	38	(Italy) Massimo Natili	Scuderia Centro Sud	Cooper-Maserati		-
DNQ	12	(Italy) Renato Pirocchi	Pescara Racing Club	Cooper-Climax		-
DNQ	6	(Belgium) André Pilette	Equipe Nationale Belge	Emeryson-Climax		-
DNQ	16	(Switzerland) "Wal Ever"	"Wal Ever"	Cooper-O.S.C.A.		-
DNQ	20	(Italy) Giuseppe Maugeri	Giuseppe Maugeri	Cooper-Climax		-
DNQ	4	(France) François Santé	François Santé	Cooper-Climax		-
DNA	24	(Switzerland) André Wicky	André Wicky	Cooper-Climax	Withdrew	-

Previous race: 1961 BRDC International Trophy	Formula One non-championship races 1961 season	Next race: 1961 London Trophy
Previous race: 1960 Naples Grand Prix	Naples Grand Prix	Next race: 1962 Naples Grand Prix
