= List of 1961 motorsport champions =

1961 motorsport champions
Previous: 1960	Next: 1962

This list of 1961 motorsport champions is a list of national or international auto racing series with a Championship decided by the points or positions earned by a driver from multiple races.

Some titles may be from single events.

== Motorcycle racing ==
Series	Rider	refer
500cc World Championship	(Federation of Rhodesia and Nyasaland) Gary Hocking	1961 Grand Prix motorcycle racing season
350cc World Championship	(Federation of Rhodesia and Nyasaland) Gary Hocking	1961 Grand Prix motorcycle racing season
250cc World Championship	(United Kingdom) Mike Hailwood	1961 Grand Prix motorcycle racing season
125cc World Championship	(Australia) Tom Phillis	1961 Grand Prix motorcycle racing season
Motocross World Championship	500cc: (Sweden) Sten Lundin	1961 Motocross World Championship
Motocross World Championship	250cc: (United Kingdom) Dave Bickers	1961 Motocross World Championship
Speedway World Championship	(Sweden) Ove Fundin	1961 Individual Speedway World Championship

== Open wheel racing ==
Series	Driver	refer
Formula One World Championship	(United States) Phil Hill	1961 Formula One season
Formula One World Championship	Constructors: (Italy) Ferrari	1961 Formula One season
Australian Drivers' Championship	(Australia) Bill Patterson	1961 Australian Drivers' Championship
Campionato Italiano	(Italy) "Geki"	
Campionato Italiano	Teams: (Italy) Scuderia Madunina	
East German Formula Junior Championship	(East Germany) Willy Lehmann	1961 East German Formula Junior Championship
South African Formula One Championship	(South Africa) Syd van der Vyver	1961 South African Formula One Championship
USAC National Championship	(United States) A. J. Foyt	1961 USAC Championship Car season
Formula Three
John Davy Formula Junior (British F3)	(United Kingdom) Bill Moss	1961 British Formula Three Championship
BRSCC Formula Junior (British F3)	(United Kingdom) Mike Ledbrook	1961 British Formula Three Championship
Motor Racing Formula Junior (British F3)	(United Kingdom) Trevor Taylor	1961 British Formula Three Championship
Soviet Formula 3 Championship	(Estonian Soviet Socialist Republic) Ants Seiler	1961 Soviet Formula 3 Championship

== Rallying ==
Series	Drivers	Season article
British Rally Championship	(United Kingdom) Bill Bengry	1961 British Rally Championship
British Rally Championship	Co-Drivers: (United Kingdom) David Skeffington	1961 British Rally Championship
Estonian Rally Championship	(Estonian Soviet Socialist Republic) Kalju Nurme	1961 Estonian Rally Championship
Estonian Rally Championship	Co-Drivers: (Estonian Soviet Socialist Republic) Aadu Viik	1961 Estonian Rally Championship
European Rally Championship	(Germany) Hans-Joachim Walter	1961 European Rally Championship
European Rally Championship	Co-Drivers: (Germany) Ewald Stock	1961 European Rally Championship
Finnish Rally Championship	(Finland) Rauno Aaltonen	1961 Finnish Rally Championship
Italian Rally Championship	(Italy) Luigi Marsaglia	1961 Italian Rally Championship
Italian Rally Championship	Co-Drivers: (Italy) Giovanni Prada Moroni	1961 Italian Rally Championship
Italian Rally Championship	Manufacturers: (Italy) Fiat	1961 Italian Rally Championship
South African National Rally Championship	(South Africa) Pieter Muhl	
South African National Rally Championship	Co-Drivers: (South Africa) Reinhard Muhl	
Spanish Rally Championship	(Spain) Juan Fernández	
Spanish Rally Championship	Co-Drivers: (Spain) Ramón Grifoll	

== Sports car and GT ==
Series	Driver	refer
World Sportscar Championship	(Italy) Ferrari	1961 World Sportscar Championship season
USAC Road Racing Championship	(United Kingdom) Ken Miles	1961 USAC Road Racing Championship season
SCCA National Sports Car Championship	D Modified: (United States) Roger Penske	1961 SCCA National Sports Car Championship season
SCCA National Sports Car Championship	E Modified: (United States) Bob Holbert	1961 SCCA National Sports Car Championship season
Australian GT Championship	(Australia) Frank Matich	1961 Australian GT Championship

== Stock car racing ==
Series	Driver	Season article
NASCAR Grand National Series	(United States) Ned Jarrett	1961 NASCAR Grand National Series
NASCAR Grand National Series	Manufacturers: (United States) Chevrolet	1961 NASCAR Grand National Series
NASCAR Pacific Coast Late Model Series	(United States) Eddie Gray	1961 NASCAR Pacific Coast Late Model Series
ARCA Racing Series	(United States) Harold Smith	1961 ARCA Racing Series
Turismo Carretera	(Argentina) Oscar Alfredo Gálvez	1961 Turismo Carretera
USAC Stock Car National Championship	(United States) Paul Goldsmith	1961 USAC Stock Car National Championship

== Touring car ==
Series	Driver	refer
Australian Touring Car Championship	(Australia) Bill Pitt	1961 Australian Touring Car Championship
British Saloon Car Championship	(United Kingdom) John Whitmore	1961 British Saloon Car Championship

== See also ==
- List of motorsport championships
- Auto racing
