= List of 1959 motorsport champions =

1959 motorsport champions
Previous: 1958	Next: 1960

This list of 1959 motorsport champions is a list of national or international auto racing series with a Championship decided by the points or positions earned by a driver from multiple races.

== Motorcycle racing ==
Series	Rider	Season article
500cc World Championship	(United Kingdom) John Surtees	1959 Grand Prix motorcycle racing season
350cc World Championship	(United Kingdom) John Surtees	1959 Grand Prix motorcycle racing season
250cc World Championship	(Italy) Carlo Ubbiali	1959 Grand Prix motorcycle racing season
125cc World Championship	(Italy) Carlo Ubbiali	1959 Grand Prix motorcycle racing season
Motocross World Championship	500cc: (Sweden) Sten Lundin	1959 Motocross World Championship
Motocross World Championship	250cc: (Sweden) Rolf Tibblin	1959 Motocross World Championship
Speedway World Championship	(New Zealand) Ronnie Moore	1959 Individual Speedway World Championship

== Open wheel racing ==
Series	Driver	Season article
Formula One World Championship	(Australia) Jack Brabham	1959 Formula One season
Formula One World Championship	Constructors: (United Kingdom) Cooper-Climax	1959 Formula One season
USAC National Championship	(United States) Rodger Ward	1959 USAC Championship Car season
Australian Drivers' Championship	(Australia) Len Lukey	1959 Australian Drivers' Championship
Campionato Italiano	(Italy) Raffaele Cammarota	
Campionato Italiano	Team: (Italy) Scuderia Bardahl	
Formula Three
British Formula Three Championship	(United Kingdom) Don Parker	1959 British Formula Three Championship
Finnish Formula Three Championship	(Finland) Curt Lincoln	1959 Finnish Formula Three Championship

== Rallying ==
Series	Drivers	Season article
British Rally Championship	(United Kingdom) John Sprinzel	1959 British Rally Championship
British Rally Championship	Co-Drivers: (United Kingdom) Stuart Turner	1959 British Rally Championship
Canadian Rally Championship	(Canada) Art Dempsey	1959 Canadian Rally Championship
Canadian Rally Championship	Co-Drivers: (Canada) Bill A. Silvera	1959 Canadian Rally Championship
Estonian Rally Championship	(Soviet Union) B. Borsianski	1959 Estonian Rally Championship
Estonian Rally Championship	Co-Drivers: (Soviet Union) V. Jegorov	1959 Estonian Rally Championship
European Rally Championship	(France) Paul Coltelloni	1959 European Rally Championship
European Rally Championship	Co-Drivers: (France) P. Alexandre	1959 European Rally Championship
Finnish Rally Championship	(Finland) Esko Keinänen	1959 Finnish Rally Championship
Spanish Rally Championship	(Spain) Luciano Eliakin	
Spanish Rally Championship	Co-Drivers: (Spain) "Pascal"	

== Sports car and GT ==
Series	Champion	Season article
World Sportscar Championship	(United Kingdom) Aston Martin	1959 World Sportscar Championship
USAC Road Racing Championship	(United States) Augie Pabst	1959 USAC Road Racing Championship
SCCA National Sports Car Championship	C Modified: (United States) Dick Thompson	1959 SCCA National Sports Car Championship

== Stock car racing ==
Series	Driver	Season article
NASCAR Grand National Series	(United States) Lee Petty	1959 NASCAR Grand National Series
NASCAR Grand National Series	Manufacturers: (United States) Chevrolet	1959 NASCAR Grand National Series
NASCAR Pacific Coast Late Model Series	(United States) Bob Ross	1959 NASCAR Pacific Coast Late Model Series
ARCA Racing Series	(United States) Nelson Stacy	1959 ARCA Racing Series
Turismo Carretera	(Argentina) Rodolfo de Álzaga	1959 Turismo Carretera
USAC Stock Car National Championship	(United States) Fred Lorenzen	1959 USAC Stock Car National Championship

== Touring car ==
Series	Drivers	Season article
British Saloon Car Championship	(United Kingdom) Jeff Uren	1959 British Saloon Car Championship

== See also ==
- List of motorsport championships
- Auto racing
