= 1958 in motorsport =

The following is an overview of the events of 1958 in motorsport including the major racing events, motorsport venues that were opened and closed during a year, championships and non-championship events that were established and disestablished in a year, and births and deaths of racing drivers and other motorsport people.

== Annual events ==
The calendar includes only annual major non-championship events or annual events that had own significance separate from the championship. For the dates of the championship events see related season articles.

Date	Event	Ref
11 May	42nd Targa Florio	
18 May	16th Monaco Grand Prix	
30 May	42nd Indianapolis 500	
2–6 June	40th Isle of Man TT	
21–22 June	26th 24 Hours of Le Mans	
16 November	5th Macau Grand Prix	

== Births ==
Date	Month	Name	Nationality	Occupation	Note	Ref
7	January	Miki Biasion	Italian	Rally driver	World Rally champion (1988-1989).	
10	January	Eddie Cheever	American	Racing driver	Indianapolis 500 winner (1998).	
11	March	Eddie Lawson	American	Motorcycle racer	500cc Grand Prix motorcycle racing World champion (1984, 1986, 1988-1989).	
26	April	Johnny Dumfries	British	Racing driver	24 Hours of Le Mans winner (1988).	
18	August	Didier Auriol	French	Rally driver	World Rally champion (1994).	

== Deaths ==
Date	Month	Name	Age	Nationality	Occupation	Note	Ref
8	January	John Duff	62	Canadian	Racing driver	24 Hours of Le Mans winner (1924).	
30	May	Pat O'Connor	29	American	Racing driver	Died during 1958 Indianapolis 500.	
6	July	Luigi Musso	33	Italian	Racing driver	1956 Argentine Grand Prix winner	
3	August	Peter Collins	26	British	Racing driver	Winner of 1956 Belgian Grand Prix, 1956 French Grand Prix and 1958 British Grand Prix	
21	September	Peter Whitehead	71	British	Racing driver	24 Hours of Le Mans winner (1951)	

== See also ==
- List of 1958 motorsport champions
