= List of 1958 motorsport champions =

1958 motorsport champions
Previous: 1957	Next: 1959

This list of 1958 motorsport champions is a list of national or international auto racing series with a Championship decided by the points or positions earned by a driver from multiple races.

== Motorcycle racing ==
Series	Rider	Season article
500cc World Championship	(United Kingdom) John Surtees	1958 Grand Prix motorcycle racing season
350cc World Championship	(United Kingdom) John Surtees	1958 Grand Prix motorcycle racing season
250cc World Championship	(Italy) Tarquinio Provini	1958 Grand Prix motorcycle racing season
125cc World Championship	(Italy) Carlo Ubbiali	1958 Grand Prix motorcycle racing season
Motocross World Championship	500cc: (Belgium) René Baeten	1958 Motocross World Championship
Motocross World Championship	250cc: (Czech Republic) Jaromír Čížek	1958 Motocross World Championship
Speedway World Championship	(New Zealand) Barry Briggs	1958 Individual Speedway World Championship

== Open wheel racing ==
Series	Driver	Season article
Formula One World Championship	(United Kingdom) Mike Hawthorn	1958 Formula One season
Formula One World Championship	Constructors: (United Kingdom) Vanwall	1958 Formula One season
USAC National Championship	(United States) Tony Bettenhausen	1958 USAC Championship Car season
Australian Drivers' Championship	(Australia) Stan Jones	1958 Australian Drivers' Championship
Campionato Italiano	(Italy) Roberto Lippi	
Campionato Italiano	Team: (Italy) Scuderia Bardahl	
Formula Three
British Formula Three Championship	(United Kingdom) Trevor Taylor	1958 British Formula Three Championship
East German Formula Three Championship	(East Germany) Heinz Melkus	1958 East German Formula Three Championship
Finnish Formula Three Championship	(Finland) Heimo Hietarinta	1958 Finnish Formula Three Championship

== Rallying ==
Series	Drivers	Season article
British Rally Championship	(United Kingdom) Ron Gouldbourn	1958 British Rally Championship
British Rally Championship	Co-Drivers: (United Kingdom) Stuart Turner	1958 British Rally Championship
European Rally Championship	(Sweden) Gunnar Andersson	1958 European Rally Championship
European Rally Championship	Co-Drivers: (Norway) Nils Fredrik Grøndal	1958 European Rally Championship
European Rally Championship	Ladies: (United Kingdom) Pat Moss	1958 European Rally Championship
Spanish Rally Championship	(Spain) Jaime Milans del Bosch	
Spanish Rally Championship	Co-Drivers: (Spain) Antonio Forest	

== Sports car and GT ==
Series	Champion	Season article
World Sportscar Championship	(Italy) Ferrari	1958 World Sportscar Championship
USAC Road Racing Championship	(United States) Dan Gurney	1958 USAC Road Racing Championship
SCCA National Sports Car Championship	C Modified: (United States) Walt Hansgen	1958 SCCA National Sports Car Championship

== Stock car racing ==
Series	Driver	Season article
NASCAR Grand National Series	(United States) Lee Petty	1958 NASCAR Grand National Series
NASCAR Grand National Series	Manufacturers: (United States) Chevrolet	1958 NASCAR Grand National Series
NASCAR Pacific Coast Late Model Series	(United States) Eddie Gray	1958 NASCAR Pacific Coast Late Model Series
ARCA Racing Series	(United States) Nelson Stacy	1958 ARCA Racing Series
Turismo Carretera	(Argentina) Juan Gálvez	1958 Turismo Carretera
USAC Stock Car National Championship	(United States) Fred Lorenzen	1958 USAC Stock Car National Championship

== Touring car ==
Series	Drivers	Season article
British Saloon Car Championship	(United Kingdom) Jack Sears	1958 British Saloon Car Championship

== See also ==
- List of motorsport championships
- Auto racing
