= List of 1957 motorsport champions =

1957 motorsport champions
Previous: 1956	Next: 1958

This list of 1957 motorsport champions is a list of national or international auto racing series with a Championship decided by the points or positions earned by a driver from multiple races.

== Motorcycle racing ==
Series	Rider	refer
500cc World Championship	(Italy) Libero Liberati	1957 Grand Prix motorcycle racing season
350cc World Championship	(Australia) Keith Campbell	1957 Grand Prix motorcycle racing season
250cc World Championship	(United Kingdom) Cecil Sandford	1957 Grand Prix motorcycle racing season
125cc World Championship	(Italy) Tarquinio Provini	1957 Grand Prix motorcycle racing season
Motocross World Championship	500cc: (Sweden) Bill Nilsson	1957 Motocross World Championship
Motocross World Championship	250cc: (Germany) Fritz Betzelbacher	1957 Motocross World Championship
Speedway World Championship	(New Zealand) Barry Briggs	1957 Individual Speedway World Championship

== Open wheel racing ==
Series	Driver	Season article
Formula One World Championship	(Argentina) Juan Manuel Fangio	1957 Formula One season
USAC National Championship	(United States) Jimmy Bryan	1957 USAC Championship Car season
Australian Drivers' Championship	(Australia) Lex Davison	1957 Australian Drivers' Championship
Formula Three
BRSCC British Formula Three Championship	(United Kingdom) Jim Russell	1957 BRSCC British Formula Three Championship
East German Formula Three Championship	(East Germany) Willy Lehmann	1957 East German Formula Three Championship

== Rallying ==
Series	Drivers	Season article
Canadian Rally Championship	(Canada) Leslie Chelminski	1957 Canadian Rally Championship
Canadian Rally Championship	Co-Drivers: (Canada) Les Stanley	1957 Canadian Rally Championship
European Rally Championship	(Germany) Ruprecht Hopfen	1957 European Rally Championship
European Rally Championship	Co-Drivers: (Germany) Kurt van Loesch	1957 European Rally Championship
Spanish Rally Championship	(Spain) Fernando Roqué	1957 Spanish Rally Championship
Spanish Rally Championship	Co-Drivers: (Spain) Alfonso Marimón	1957 Spanish Rally Championship

== Sports car and GT ==
Series	Driver	Season article
World Sportscar Championship	(Italy) Ferrari	1957 World Sportscar Championship
SCCA National Sports Car Championship	C Sports: (United States) Walt Hansgen	1957 SCCA National Sports Car Championship
SCCA National Sports Car Championship	D Sports: (United States) Paul O'Shea	1957 SCCA National Sports Car Championship
SCCA National Sports Car Championship	E Sports: (Switzerland) Gaston Andrey	1957 SCCA National Sports Car Championship
SCCA National Sports Car Championship	B Production: (United States) Dick Thompson	1957 SCCA National Sports Car Championship

== Stock car racing ==
Series	Driver	Season article
NASCAR Grand National Series	(United States) Buck Baker	1957 NASCAR Grand National Series
NASCAR Grand National Series	Manufacturers: (United States) Ford	1957 NASCAR Grand National Series
NASCAR Pacific Coast Late Model Division	(United States) Lloyd Dane	1957 NASCAR Pacific Coast Late Model Division
MARC Racing Series	(United States) Iggy Katona	1957 MARC Racing Series
Turismo Carretera	(Argentina) Juan Gálvez	1957 Turismo Carretera
USAC Stock Car National Championship	(United States) Jerry Unser	1957 USAC Stock Car Series

== See also ==
- List of motorsport championships
- Auto racing
