= 1961 Italian Grand Prix =

Formula One motor race held in 1961

Race details
- Date: 10 September 1961
- Official name: XXXII Gran Premio d'Italia
- Location: Autodromo Nazionale di Monza; Monza, Italy
- Course: Permanent racing facility
- Course length: 10.00 km (6.214 miles)
- Distance: 43 laps, 430.00 km (267.190 miles)
- Weather: Sunny

Pole position
Driver	(Germany) Wolfgang von Trips	Ferrari
- Time: 2:46.3

Fastest lap
Driver	(Italy) Giancarlo Baghetti	Ferrari
- Time: 2:48.4 on lap 2

Podium
First	(United States) Phil Hill	Ferrari
Second	(United States) Dan Gurney	Porsche
Third	(New Zealand) Bruce McLaren	Cooper-Climax

The 1961 Italian Grand Prix was a Formula One motor race held on 10 September 1961 at Monza. It was race 7 of 8 in both the 1961 World Championship of Drivers and the 1961 International Cup for Formula One Manufacturers.

The race was marked by an accident with the highest death toll in the history of Formula One, when on the end of lap 2, at the approach to the Parabolica, German driver Wolfgang von Trips lost control of his Ferrari after colliding with the Lotus of Jim Clark and crashed into a fence line of spectators, killing 15 and himself. The race was not stopped, allegedly to avoid the spectators going home en masse jamming the roads around the stadium and thus impeding the rescue work for the injured. This was also the last Formula One race ever to be held on the full 10 kilometres (6.2 mi) Monza circuit, with the two banked corners and the straight between the bankings included.

The race was won by von Trips's American teammate Phil Hill; since von Trips was the only one who could challenge him, Hill won the World Championship with one race to go, becoming the first American driver to win the Formula One World Championship. Hill's Monza win also assured Ferrari of the Constructors' Championship for 1961.

== Background ==
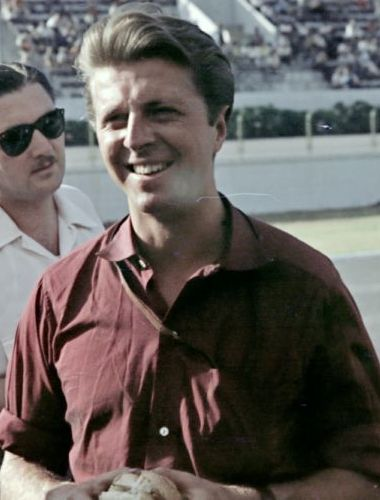
Wolfgang von Trips, who was killed during the race

Before the running of the 1961 Italian Grand Prix, four drivers were mathematically in contention for the year's Drivers' Championship: Wolfgang von Trips, Phil Hill, Stirling Moss, and Richie Ginther. Realistically, however, the championship had come down to two Ferrari drivers, von Trips and Hill.

In the Constructors' Championship, two teams were mathematically in contention: Ferrari, and Lotus-Climax. In order for Lotus to overtake Ferrari at this point, one of their drivers had to win both this race and the final race of the season, the 1961 United States Grand Prix.

== Qualifying ==
37 cars attempted to qualify for the Italian Grand Prix, and 32 had sufficiently fast times to make it to the race grid. Similar to the 107% rule of today, a rule was in place for the 1961 season enforcing a 115% cutoff against the time of the second fastest driver.

== Classification ==
=== Qualifying ===
Pos	No	Driver	Constructor	Qualifying times		Gap
Pos	No	Driver	Constructor	Q1	Q2	Gap
1	4	(West Germany) Wolfgang von Trips	Ferrari	2:50.3	2:46.3	—
2	8	(Mexico) Ricardo Rodríguez	Ferrari	2:49.6	2:46.4	+0.1
3	6	(United States) Richie Ginther	Ferrari	2:46.8	2:47.1	+0.5
4	2	(United States) Phil Hill	Ferrari	2:48.9	2:47.2	+0.9
5	24	(United Kingdom) Graham Hill	BRM-Climax	2:55.0	2:48.7	+2.4
6	32	(Italy) Giancarlo Baghetti	Ferrari	2:53.4	2:49.0	+2.7
7	36	(United Kingdom) Jim Clark	Lotus-Climax	2:52.4	2:49.2	+2.9
8	44	(Sweden) Jo Bonnier	Porsche	2:53.6	2:49.6	+3.3
9	38	(United Kingdom) Innes Ireland	Lotus-Climax	2:56.7	2:50.3	+4.0
10	10	(Australia) Jack Brabham	Cooper-Climax	2:55.1	2:51.6	+5.3
11	28	(United Kingdom) Stirling Moss	Lotus-Climax	2:51.8	2:57.5	+5.5
12	46	(United States) Dan Gurney	Porsche	2:53.4	2:52.0	+5.7
13	26	(United Kingdom) Tony Brooks	BRM-Climax	2:58.8	2:52.2	+5.9
14	12	(New Zealand) Bruce McLaren	Cooper-Climax	2:59.8	2:53.4	+7.1
15	74	(Netherlands) Carel Godin de Beaufort	Porsche	2:57.9	2:53.8	+7.5
16	60	(United Kingdom) Jackie Lewis	Cooper-Climax	No time	2:54.0	+7.7
17	22	(United States) Masten Gregory	Lotus-Climax	3:01.4	2:55.2	+8.9
18	40	(United Kingdom) Roy Salvadori	Cooper-Climax	3:02.0	2:55.2	+8.9
19	42	(United Kingdom) John Surtees	Cooper-Climax	2:59.3	2:55.6	+9.3
20	50	(Italy) Nino Vaccarella	De Tomaso-Alfa Romeo	3:03.7	2:56.0	+9.7
21	62	(Italy) Lorenzo Bandini	Cooper-Maserati	2:57.7	2:58.2	+11.4
22	48	(France) Maurice Trintignant	Cooper-Maserati	3:03.9	2:58.7	+12.4
23	20	(United Kingdom) Henry Taylor	Lotus-Climax	3:03.8	3:00.6	+14.3
24	54	(Italy) Roberto Bussinello	De Tomaso-Alfa Romeo	3:09.8	3:01.7	+15.4
25	18	(United Kingdom) Gerry Ashmore	Lotus-Climax	No time	3:03.0	+16.7
26	30	(United Kingdom) Jack Fairman	Cooper-Climax	3:06.7	3:04.8	+18.5
27	16	(United Kingdom) Tim Parnell	Lotus-Climax	3:15.4	3:05.7	+19.4
28	56	(West Germany) Wolfgang Seidel	Lotus-Climax	No time	3:06.0	+19.7
29	58	(Italy) Renato Pirocchi	Cooper-Maserati	3:18.3	3:06.5	+20.2
30	72	(Italy) Gaetano Starrabba	Lotus-Maserati	No time	3:07.9	+21.6
31	14	(United Kingdom) Brian Naylor	JBW-Climax	3:13.0	3:08.1	+21.8
32	52	(Italy) Roberto Lippi	De Tomaso-Osca	3:27.7	3:08.9	+22.6
115% cutoff time: 3:11.36
DNQ	68	(Belgium) André Pilette	Emeryson-Climax	3:19.4	3:11.6	+25.3

=== Race ===
Pos	No	Driver	Constructor	Laps	Time/Retired	Grid	Points
1	2	(United States) Phil Hill	Ferrari	43	2:03:13.0	4	9
2	46	(United States) Dan Gurney	Porsche	43	+31.2	12	6
3	12	(New Zealand) Bruce McLaren	Cooper-Climax	43	+2:28.4	14	4
4	60	(United Kingdom) Jackie Lewis	Cooper-Climax	43	+2:40.4	16	3
5	26	(United Kingdom) Tony Brooks	BRM-Climax	43	+2:40.5	13	2
6	40	(United Kingdom) Roy Salvadori	Cooper-Climax	42	+1 Lap	18	1
7	74	(Netherlands) Carel Godin de Beaufort	Porsche	41	+2 Laps	15	
8	62	(Italy) Lorenzo Bandini	Cooper-Maserati	41	+2 Laps	21	
9	48	(France) Maurice Trintignant	Cooper-Maserati	41	+2 Laps	22	
10	16	(United Kingdom) Tim Parnell	Lotus-Climax	40	+3 Laps	27	
11	20	(United Kingdom) Henry Taylor	Lotus-Climax	39	+4 Laps	23	
12	58	(Italy) Renato Pirocchi	Cooper-Maserati	38	+5 Laps	29	
Ret	28	(United Kingdom) Stirling Moss	Lotus-Climax	36	Wheel bearing	11	
Ret	6	(United States) Richie Ginther	Ferrari	23	Engine	3	
Ret	72	(Italy) Gaetano Starrabba	Lotus-Maserati	19	Engine	30	
Ret	44	(Sweden) Jo Bonnier	Porsche	14	Suspension	8	
Ret	8	(Mexico) Ricardo Rodríguez	Ferrari	13	Fuel system	2	
Ret	32	(Italy) Giancarlo Baghetti	Ferrari	13	Engine	6	
Ret	50	(Italy) Nino Vaccarella	De Tomaso-Alfa Romeo	13	Engine	20	
Ret	22	(United States) Masten Gregory	Lotus-Climax	11	Suspension	17	
Ret	24	(United Kingdom) Graham Hill	BRM-Climax	10	Engine	5	
Ret	10	(Australia) Jack Brabham	Cooper-Climax	8	Overheating	10	
Ret	14	(United Kingdom) Brian Naylor	JBW-Climax	6	Engine	31	
Ret	38	(United Kingdom) Innes Ireland	Lotus-Climax	5	Chassis	9	
Ret	30	(United Kingdom) Jack Fairman	Cooper-Climax	5	Engine	26	
Ret	42	(United Kingdom) John Surtees	Cooper-Climax	2	Accident	19	
Ret	4	(West Germany) Wolfgang von Trips	Ferrari	1	Fatal collision	1	
Ret	36	(United Kingdom) Jim Clark	Lotus-Climax	1	Collision	7	
Ret	54	(Italy) Roberto Bussinello	De Tomaso-Alfa Romeo	1	Engine	24	
Ret	56	(West Germany) Wolfgang Seidel	Lotus-Climax	1	Engine	28	
Ret	52	(Italy) Roberto Lippi	De Tomaso-Osca	1	Engine	32	
Ret	18	(United Kingdom) Gerry Ashmore	Lotus-Climax	0	Accident	25	
DNQ	68	(Belgium) André Pilette	Emeryson-Climax		Too slow		
DNS	46	(West Germany) Edgar Barth	Porsche		Practice only – experimental car		
WD	58	(Italy) Massimo Natili	Cooper-Maserati		Pirocchi drove car		
DNA	34	(Italy) Alfonso Thiele	Cooper-Climax		Support race		
DNA	64	(Italy) Ernesto Prinoth	Lotus-Climax		On route to the Flugplatzrennen		
DNA	66	(Italy) Menato Boffa	Cooper-Climax		Racing at Vallelunga		
DNA	70	(Switzerland) Michael May	Lotus-Climax		Retired from racing		

== Notes ==
- This was the Formula One World Championship debut for Ricardo Rodríguez; and the first for a Mexican driver.
- This was the first (and only) pole position for Wolfgang von Trips, and the first for a German driver.

== Championship standings after the race ==
- **Bold text** indicates the World Champions.

Drivers' Championship standings

	Pos	Driver	Points
1	1	(United States) **Phil Hill**	34 (38)
1	2	(Germany) Wolfgang von Trips	33
	3	(United Kingdom) Stirling Moss	21
	4	(United States) Richie Ginther	16
2	5	(United States) Dan Gurney	15

Constructors' Championship standings

Pos	Constructor	Points
1	(Italy) **Ferrari**	40 (52)
2	(United Kingdom) Lotus-Climax	24
3	(Germany) Porsche	17
4	(United Kingdom) Cooper-Climax	13 (15)
5	(United Kingdom) BRM-Climax	3

- Notes: Only the top five positions are included for both sets of standings. Only the best 5 results counted towards the Championship. Numbers without parentheses are Championship points; numbers in parentheses are total points scored.

Previous race: 1961 German Grand Prix	FIA Formula One World Championship; 1961 season	Next race: 1961 United States Grand Prix
Previous race: 1960 Italian Grand Prix	Italian Grand Prix	Next race: 1962 Italian Grand Prix
