= 1961 British Grand Prix =

Formula One motor race

Race details
- Date: 15 July 1961
- Official name: 14th RAC British Grand Prix
- Location: Aintree Circuit, Liverpool, England
- Course: Permanent road course
- Course length: 4.828 km (3.000 miles)
- Distance: 75 laps, 362.10 km (225.00 miles)
- Weather: Torrential rain, drying later

Pole position
Driver	(United States) Phil Hill	Ferrari
- Time: 1:58.8

Fastest lap
Driver	(United Kingdom) Tony Brooks	BRM-Climax
- Time: 1:57.8 on lap 72

Podium
First	(Germany) Wolfgang von Trips	Ferrari
Second	(United States) Phil Hill	Ferrari
Third	(United States) Richie Ginther	Ferrari

The 1961 British Grand Prix was a Formula One motor race, held on 15 July 1961 at the Aintree Circuit, near Liverpool. It was race 5 of 8 in both the 1961 World Championship of Drivers and the 1961 International Cup for Formula One Manufacturers.

Following a wet weekend, with torrential rain affecting both qualifying and the race start, the Grand Prix was ultimately dominated by Scuderia Ferrari, with their drivers taking all three podium positions. The race was won by German Wolfgang von Trips, who had led for much of the race after starting from fourth place on the grid. This was von Trips's second but also his final Grand Prix victory as two races later he was killed in an accident during the 1961 Italian Grand Prix; it was also the last full-length Grand Prix won by a German until Michael Schumacher achieved his first of 91 wins at the 1992 Belgian Grand Prix. Pole position winner Phil Hill drove to second place on his way to winning the World Drivers' Championship at the end of the season, and third place was taken by Hill's American compatriot Richie Ginther.

The 1961 British Grand Prix is also notable as being the first occasion on which a four-wheel drive car, and the last at which a front engined car was entered for a World Championship race. These two accomplishments were achieved by the same vehicle: the experimental Ferguson P99-Climax run by the Rob Walker Racing Team. Although the car was disqualified for receiving assistance on the track, in the hands of Stirling Moss – who took over the car from first driver Jack Fairman after his own Lotus's brakes failed – it showed some promise. The 1961 British Grand Prix also marked the last occasion on which Moss contested a Grand Prix race on home soil, as his career was ended by an accident during a non-championship race prior to the 1962 season.

== Classification ==
=== Qualifying ===
Pos	No	Driver	Constructor	Qualifying times				Gap
Pos	No	Driver	Constructor	Q1	Q2	Q3	Q4	Gap
1	2	(United States) Phil Hill	Ferrari	2:00.8	1:58.8	2:15.8	2:05.8	—
2	6	(United States) Richie Ginther	Ferrari	2:00.8	1:58.8	2:08.4	2:06.4	+0.0
3	8	(Sweden) Jo Bonnier	Porsche	2:00.8	1:58.8	2:11.6	2:12.4	+0.0
4	4	(Germany) Wolfgang von Trips	Ferrari	2:01.4	1:58.8	2:06.0	2:06.2	+0.0
5	28	(United Kingdom) Stirling Moss	Lotus-Climax	No time	1:59.0	2:01.6	2:08.0	+0.2
6	22	(United Kingdom) Tony Brooks	BRM-Climax	2:02.2	1:59.0	2:18.0	2:09.4	+0.2
7	16	(United Kingdom) Innes Ireland	Lotus-Climax	2:01.2	1:59.2	2:42.2	2:13.8	+0.4
8	18	(United Kingdom) Jim Clark	Lotus-Climax	2:03.8	1:59.2	2:11.0	2:11.6	+0.4
9	12	(Australia) Jack Brabham	Cooper-Climax	No time	1:59.4	2:25.0	2:07.6	+0.6
10	34	(United Kingdom) John Surtees	Cooper-Climax	2:01.2	1:59.6	2:10.2	2:07.4	+0.8
11	20	(United Kingdom) Graham Hill	BRM-Climax	2:01.4	2:00.0	2:12.0	2:11.2	+1.2
12	10	(United States) Dan Gurney	Porsche	2:01.6	2:00.2	2:18.8	2:10.0	+1.4
13	36	(United Kingdom) Roy Salvadori	Cooper-Climax	2:02.0	2:00.8	2:05.6	2:07.0	+2.0
14	14	(New Zealand) Bruce McLaren	Cooper-Climax	No time	2:01.0	2:15.4	2:09.2	+2.2
15	46	(United Kingdom) Jackie Lewis	Cooper-Climax	2:03.8	2:01.0	2:29.2	No time	+2.2
16	42	(United States) Masten Gregory	Cooper-Climax	2:02.8	2:01.4	2:30.2	2:29.8	+2.6
17	30	(United Kingdom) Henry Taylor	Lotus-Climax	2:03.2	2:01.8	2:25.6	2:13.6	+3.0
18	56	(Netherlands) Carel Godin de Beaufort	Porsche	2:06.2	2:02.0	2:27.0	2:13.0	+3.2
19	58	(Italy) Giancarlo Baghetti	Ferrari	2:06.0	2:02.0	2:18.6	2:12.8	+3.2
20	26	(United Kingdom) Jack Fairman	Ferguson-Climax	2:05.8	2:03.4	2:14.6	No time	+4.6
21	60	(Italy) Lorenzo Bandini	Cooper-Maserati	2:05.6	2:03.6	2:23.0	2:12.4	+4.8
22	52	(Germany) Wolfgang Seidel	Lotus-Climax	2:06.4	2:04.2	No time	2:15.2	+5.4
23	54	(United Kingdom) Keith Greene	Gilby-Climax	2:07.4	2:06.0	No time	No time	+7.2
24	50	(South Africa) Tony Maggs	Lotus-Climax	2:28.8	2:06.4	2:15.8	2:17.2	+7.6
25	44	(United Kingdom) Ian Burgess	Lotus-Climax	No time	2:06.6	2:26.2	2:19.0	+7.8
26	40	(United Kingdom) Gerry Ashmore	Lotus-Climax	No time	2:08.2	2:30.2	No time	+9.4
27	48	(United Kingdom) Tony Marsh	Lotus-Climax	No time	No time	2:19.8	2:09.6	+10.8
28	62	(Italy) Massimo Natili	Cooper-Maserati	2:51.4	2:10.2	No time	2:38.8	+11.4
29	38	(United Kingdom) Tim Parnell	Lotus-Climax	2:23.0	No time	2:59.6	2:16.8	+18.0
30	32	(Belgium) Lucien Bianchi	Lotus-Climax	No time	No time	2:29.0	2:18.8	+20.0

=== Race ===
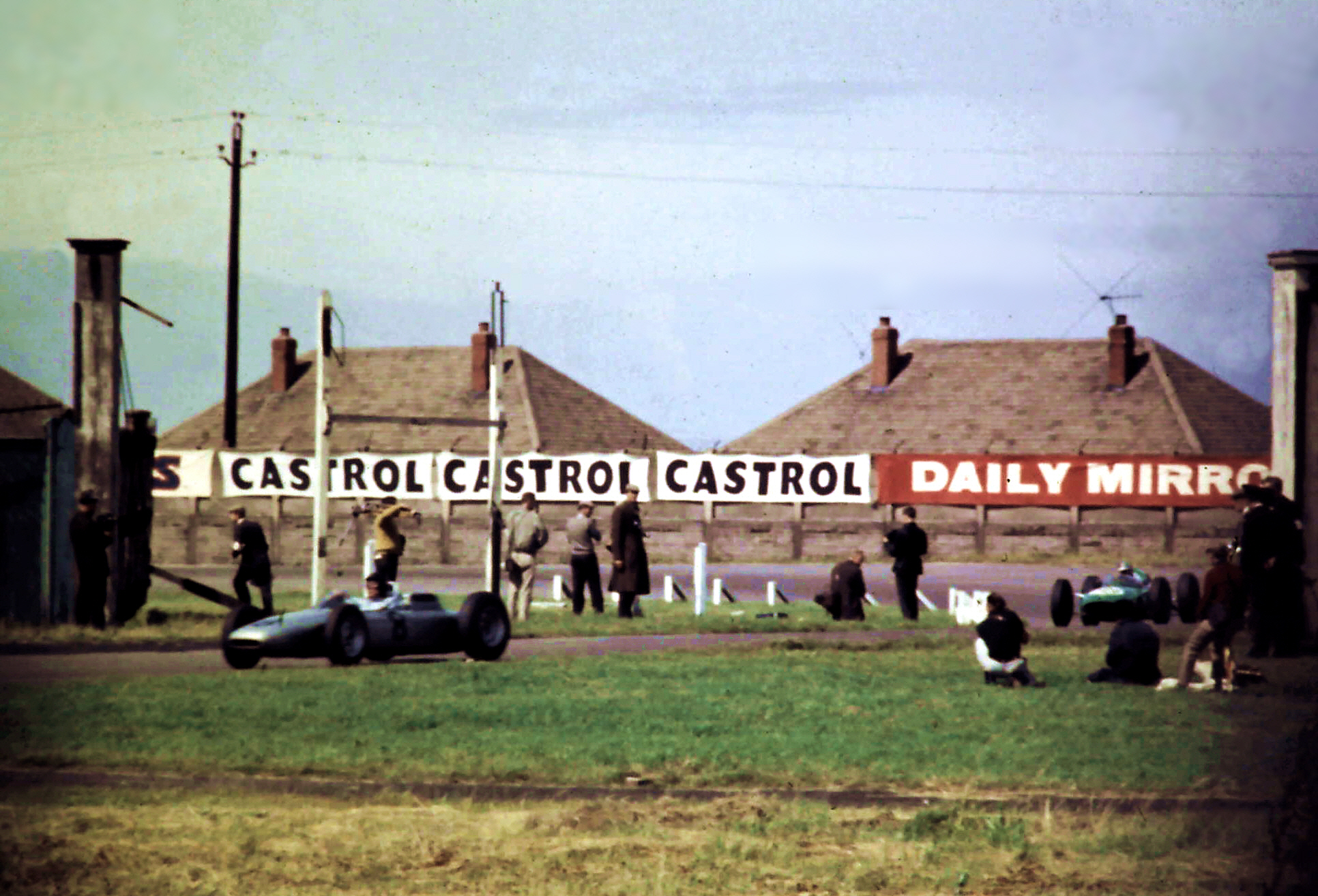
Dan Gurney in his Porsche passing Anchor Crossing

Pos	No	Driver	Constructor	Laps	Time/Retired	Grid	Points
1	4	(Germany) Wolfgang von Trips	Ferrari	75	2:40:53.6	4	9
2	2	(United States) Phil Hill	Ferrari	75	+46.0	1	6
3	6	(United States) Richie Ginther	Ferrari	75	+46.8	2	4
4	12	(Australia) Jack Brabham	Cooper-Climax	75	+1:08.6	9	3
5	8	(Sweden) Jo Bonnier	Porsche	75	+1:16.2	3	2
6	36	(United Kingdom) Roy Salvadori	Cooper-Climax	75	+1:26.2	13	1
7	10	(United States) Dan Gurney	Porsche	74	+1 Lap	12	
8	14	(New Zealand) Bruce McLaren	Cooper-Climax	74	+1 Lap	14	
9	22	(United Kingdom) Tony Brooks	BRM-Climax	73	+2 Laps	6	
10	16	(United Kingdom) Innes Ireland	Lotus-Climax	72	+3 Laps	7	
11	42	(United States) Masten Gregory	Cooper-Climax	71	+4 Laps	16	
12	60	(Italy) Lorenzo Bandini	Cooper-Maserati	71	+4 Laps	21	
13	50	(South Africa) Tony Maggs	Lotus-Climax	69	+6 Laps	24	
14	44	(United Kingdom) Ian Burgess	Lotus-Climax	69	+6 Laps	25	
15	54	(United Kingdom) Keith Greene	Gilby-Climax	69	+6 Laps	23	
16	56	(Netherlands) Carel Godin de Beaufort	Porsche	69	+6 Laps	18	
17	52	(Germany) Wolfgang Seidel	Lotus-Climax	58	+17 Laps	22	
Ret	18	(United Kingdom) Jim Clark	Lotus-Climax	62	Oil Leak	8	
DSQ	26	(United Kingdom) Jack Fairman (United Kingdom) Stirling Moss	Ferguson-Climax	56	Push Start In Pits	20	
Ret	32	(Belgium) Lucien Bianchi	Lotus-Climax	45	Gearbox	30	
Ret	28	(United Kingdom) Stirling Moss	Lotus-Climax	44	Brakes	5	
Ret	20	(United Kingdom) Graham Hill	BRM-Climax	43	Engine	11	
Ret	58	(Italy) Giancarlo Baghetti	Ferrari	27	Accident	19	
Ret	48	(United Kingdom) Tony Marsh	Lotus-Climax	25	Ignition	27	
Ret	34	(United Kingdom) John Surtees	Cooper-Climax	23	Differential	10	
Ret	38	(United Kingdom) Tim Parnell	Lotus-Climax	12	Clutch	29	
Ret	46	(United Kingdom) Jackie Lewis	Cooper-Climax	7	Handling	15	
Ret	40	(United Kingdom) Gerry Ashmore	Lotus-Climax	7	Ignition	26	
Ret	30	(United Kingdom) Henry Taylor	Lotus-Climax	5	Accident	17	
Ret	62	(Italy) Massimo Natili	Cooper-Maserati	0	Gearbox	28	
DNA	24	(Belgium) Olivier Gendebien	Emeryson-Maserati		Left the team		

== Notes ==
- This was the Formula One World Championship debut for South African driver Tony Maggs, also the first for a South African driver.
- This was the Formula One World Championship debut for British driver Gerry Ashmore.

== Championship standings after the race ==
Drivers' Championship standings

	Pos	Driver	Points
1	1	(Germany) Wolfgang von Trips	27
1	2	(United States) Phil Hill	25
1	3	(United States) Richie Ginther	16
1	4	(United Kingdom) Stirling Moss	12
	5	(Italy) Giancarlo Baghetti	9

Constructors' Championship standings

Pos	Constructor	Points
1	(Italy) Ferrari	38
2	(United Kingdom) Lotus-Climax	16
3	(Germany) Porsche	11
4	(United Kingdom) Cooper-Climax	9
5	(United Kingdom) BRM-Climax	1

- Notes: Only the top five positions are included for both sets of standings.

Previous race: 1961 French Grand Prix	FIA Formula One World Championship; 1961 season	Next race: 1961 German Grand Prix
Previous race: 1960 British Grand Prix	British Grand Prix	Next race: 1962 British Grand Prix
