= Giancarlo Baghetti =

Italian racing driver (1934–1995)

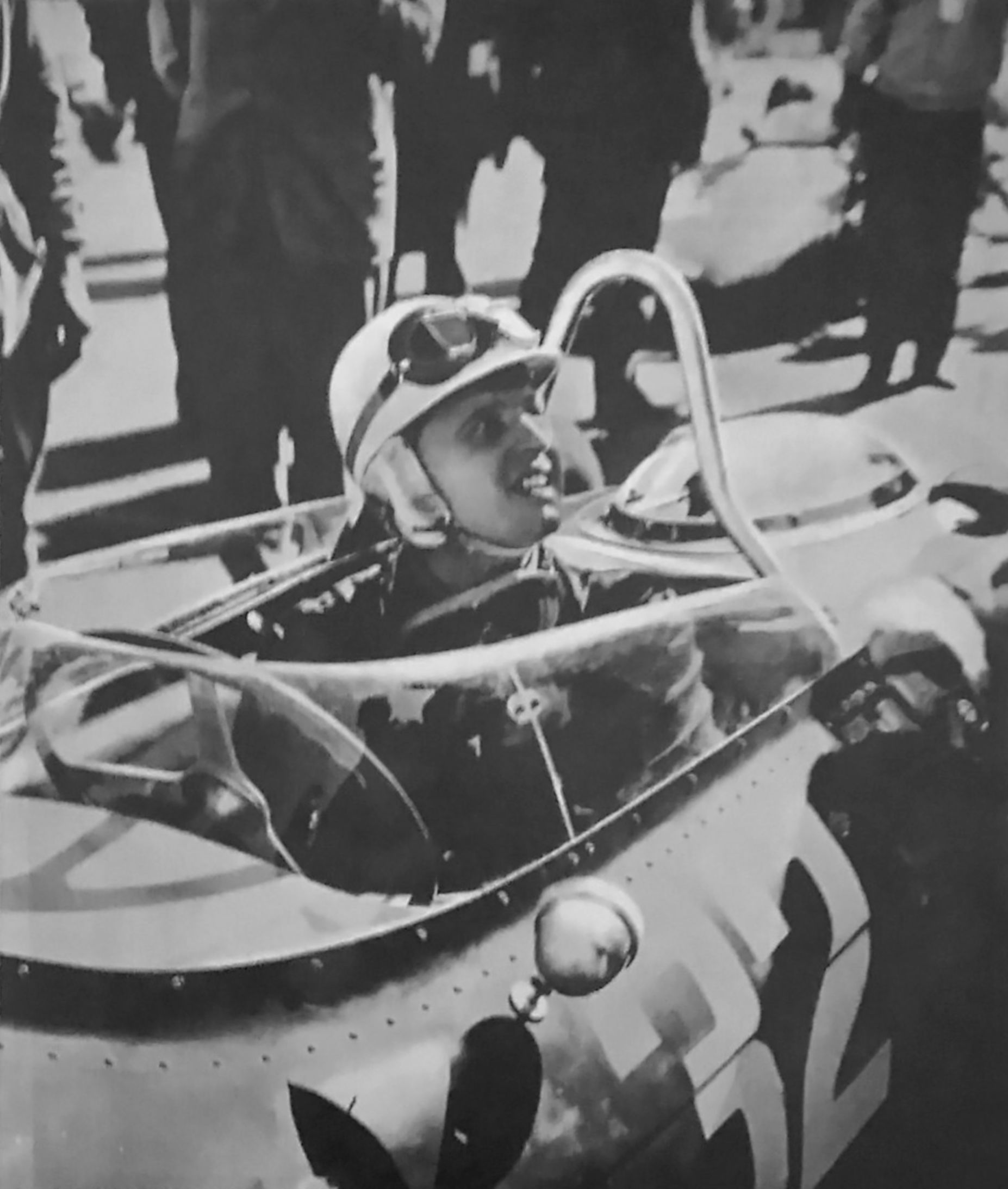
- Baghetti at the 1961 Syracuse Grand Prix
- Born: 25 December 1934; Milan, Kingdom of Italy
- Died: 27 November 1995 (aged 60); Milan, Italy

Formula One World Championship career
- Nationality: (Italy) Italian
- Active years: 1961–1967
- Team(s): Privateer Ferrari, Ferrari, ATS, Centro Sud, Brabham, Parnell, Lotus
- Entries: 21
- Championships: 0
- Wins: 1
- Podiums: 1
- Career points: 14
- Pole positions: 0
- Fastest laps: 1
- First entry: 1961 French Grand Prix
- First win: 1961 French Grand Prix
- Last entry: 1967 Italian Grand Prix

Giancarlo Baghetti (Italian pronunciation: [dʒaŋˈkarlo baˈɡetti]; 25 December 1934 – 27 November 1995) was an Italian racing driver, who competed in Formula One from 1961 to 1967. Baghetti won the 1961 French Grand Prix in a privateer Ferrari 156, and remains the only driver to win a Formula One Grand Prix on debut. (Note: Excluding the World Championship's inaugural 1950 British Grand Prix, which was won by Giuseppe Farina, as well as all non-championship Grands Prix held from 1946 to 1983. Johnnie Parsons won on his World Championship debut at the 1950 Indianapolis 500, which was not a Grand Prix despite forming a round in the championship from 1950 to 1960.)

Born and raised in Milan, Baghetti started his racing career aged 23 in production cars before progressing to Formula Junior in 1958. Three years later, he was selected by the Federazione Italiana Scuderie Automobilistiche to compete in a non-works Ferrari 156. After winning his first two non-championship Formula One races at the Syracuse and Naples Grands Prix, Baghetti made his World Championship debut with FISA at the 1961 French Grand Prix. He went on to win the race, beating the Porsche of Dan Gurney to score a hat-trick of wins in his opening three Formula One races, and become the first driver to win on his World Championship debut since the inaugural 1950 season. Despite scoring a fastest lap at the Italian Grand Prix and a non-championship victory at the Coppa Italia, Baghetti would never finish on the podium again. After the success of his rookie season, he signed for Ferrari in 1962, followed by seasons with ATS in 1963 and Scuderia Centro Sud in 1964. Baghetti made one-off appearances for Brabham, Parnell and Lotus prior to leaving the sport at the conclusion of the 1967 season.

Outside of Formula One, Baghetti won the 1000cc European Touring Car Championship in 1966 with Abarth, before retiring from motor racing two years later.

== Formula One career ==
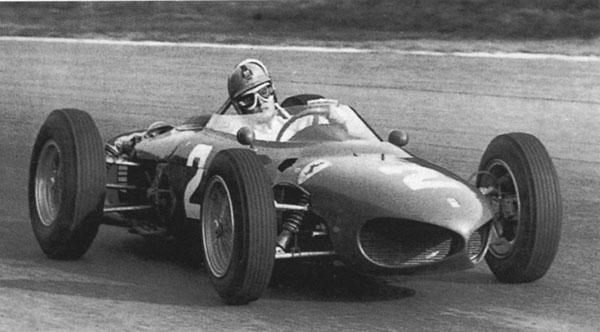
Baghetti at the 1962 Italian Grand Prix

Baghetti was born in Milan. His father was a wealthy Milan industrialist. He began racing in 1955 in production cars, moving up to Formula Junior in 1958. In 1961 he was selected by the Federazione Italiana Scuderie Automobilistiche (FISA), a coalition of independent Italian team owners who had agreed a loan deal with Ferrari for a 156 Formula Two car to run in non-Championship Grand Prix, giving experience to promising Italian drivers. Despite not showing spectacular form in lower categories, Baghetti was chosen over Albino Buttichi and Lucien de Sanctis for the seat. The car was first entered for the Syracuse Grand Prix, the first major event run under the new 1.5-litre championship regulations, and against a strong field Baghetti qualified second and won in the only Ferrari, with the British teams and Porsche 718 flat 4 unable to compete with the Dino's V6. He then drove the same car to win at the Napoli Grand Prix a few weeks later.

Team FISA entered an original 60-degree V6 Ferrari 156, at least 10 hp down on power, for Baghetti in the 1961 French Grand Prix at Reims-Gueux, for this World Championship event. Once Wolfgang von Trips, Richie Ginther and Phil Hill had all retired their works 156s, Baghetti was left to uphold Ferrari honour. He overcame Dan Gurney's Porsche 718 to take victory, giving him a hat trick of wins from his first three Grands Prix. Gurney was leading with 100 yd (91 m) to go as the cars raced to the finish line at 160 mph (260 km/h). The victory meant Baghetti became the first Italian since 1956 to win a Formula One World Championship event. It also ensured that he became the first, and only driver ever to win on their World Championship Grand Prix debut against a field that did not consist entirely of other debutant drivers.

Baghetti entered two more Championship races, retiring from the 1961 British Grand Prix and 1961 Italian Grand Prix, though he posted fastest lap in the latter. He also won the poorly attended Prima Coppa Italia race at Vallelunga in a Porsche 718.

Baghetti was promoted to the works Ferrari line-up for 1962, but took just two Championship placings – fourth at the Dutch Grand Prix, and fifth at the Italian Grand Prix, as Ferrari was outclassed by the British teams. Baghetti took second in the non-Championship Mediterranean Grand Prix. He was offered a full Ferrari F1 drive for 1963, but had already signed with a rival team. Enzo Ferrari rated Baghetti highly, calling him, 'a lesser Varzi'. Baghetti was involved in 1963 in the disastrous ATS effort in 1963, joining up with Phil Hill for Carlo Chiti's breakaway team, but failed to register a finish from five starts. For 1964 he switched to Scuderia Centro Sud's outdated BRM P57 cars, peaking with seventh at the Austrian Grand Prix. His Grand Prix career was then virtually over, though he had three more one-off drives, all at the Italian Grand Prix – a works Brabham in 1965, a Reg Parnell-semiworks Dino Ferrari 2.4 V6 in which he ran strongly ahead of Arundell's Lotus V8 Climax and Anderson's 2.7 litre Brabham, running 5th in 1966 and a similarly competent drive in a works Lotus 49 in 1967, running in midfield and passing Amon and Ickx and would have scored a point but for a blown engine.

== Post-Formula One racing ==
Baghetti achieved some success in the European Touring Car Championship with Alfa Romeo and FIAT Abarth, winning the 1966 1000cc Class Championship in an Abarth 1000. After dabbling in Formula Three, he retired after a huge accident at the 1967 "Monza Lottery". Boley Pittard of England was burned severely when his Lola burst into flames at the start of the final qualifying heat. Baghetti won the event in a Branca with an average speed over thirty-five laps of 114 mph (183 km/h). In June 1968, Baghetti was in a huge pile-up on the 23rd lap of a Formula Two race at Monza. He was driving a Dino.

Baghetti later became a journalist and photographer in motorsport and fashion, and promoted various industrial videos for Fiat.

== Death and legacy ==
Baghetti's Championship debut win has secured him a footnote in Formula One history, as he became the only driver to have won his first three Formula One races, starting with two non-championship Grand Prix races in Italy. Baghetti died of cancer on 27 November 1995.

== Complete Formula One World Championship results ==
(key) (Races in italics indicate fastest lap)

Year	Entrant	Chassis	Engine	1	2	3	4	5	6	7	8	9	10	11	WDC	Points
1961	FISA	Ferrari 156	Ferrari V6	MON	NED	BEL	FRA; 1								9th	9
1961	Scuderia Sant Ambroeus	Ferrari 156	Ferrari V6					GBR; Ret	GER	ITA; Ret	USA				9th	9
1962	Scuderia Ferrari	Ferrari 156	Ferrari V6	NED; 4	MON	BEL; Ret	FRA	GBR	GER; 10	ITA; 5	USA	RSA			11th	5
1963	Automobili Turismo e Sport	ATS 100	ATS V8	MON	BEL; Ret	NED; Ret	FRA	GBR	GER	ITA; 15	USA; Ret	MEX; Ret	RSA		NC	0
1964	Scuderia Centro Sud	BRM P57	BRM V8	MON; DNA	NED; 10	BEL; 8	FRA	GBR; 12	GER; Ret	AUT; 7	ITA; 8	USA	MEX		NC	0
1965	Brabham Racing Organisation	Brabham BT7	Climax V8	RSA	MON	BEL	FRA	GBR	NED	GER	ITA; Ret	USA	MEX		NC	0
1966	Reg Parnell Racing Ltd	Ferrari 246	Ferrari V6	MON	BEL	FRA	GBR	NED	GER	ITA; NC	USA	MEX			NC	0
1967	Team Lotus	Lotus 49	Cosworth V8	RSA	MON	NED	BEL	FRA	GBR	GER	CAN	ITA; Ret	USA	MEX	NC	0

=== Non-championship ===
(key) (Races in italics indicate fastest lap)

Year	Entrant	Chassis	Engine	1	2	3	4	5	6	7	8	9	10	11	12	13	14	15	16	17	18	19	20	21
1961	FISA	Ferrari 156	Ferrari V6	LOM	GLV	PAU	BRX	VIE	AIN	SYR; 1	NAP; 1	LON	SIL	SOL	KAN	DAN	MOD	FLG	OUL	LEW				
1961	Scuderia Sant Ambroeus	Porsche 718	Porsche Flat-4																		VAL; 1	RAN	NAT	RSA
1962	Scuderia Ferrari	Ferrari 156	Ferrari V6	CAP	BRX	LOM	LAV	GLV	PAU	AIN; 4	INT	NAP	MAL	CLP	RMS; DNA	SOL	KAN	MED; 2	DAN	OUL	MEX	RAN	NAT	
1963	Ecurie Filipinetti	Lotus 21	Climax Straight-4	LOM	GLV	PAU	IMO; DNQ	SYR	AIN	INT	ROM	SOL	KAN	MED	AUT	OUL	RAN							
1964	Scuderia Centro Sud	BRM P57	BRM V8	DMT; DNS	NWT; 9	SYR; Ret	AIN; 9	INT; 8	SOL	MED	RAN													
1965	Scuderia Centro Sud	BRM P57	BRM V8	ROC	SYR	SMT	INT	MED; Ret	RAN															
1966	Anglo-Suisse Racing Team	Lotus 33	Climax V8	RSA	SYR; DNS	INT	OUL																	

== See also ==
- Formula One drivers from Italy

Sporting positions
Preceded by Ed Swart	European Touring Car Championship; Div.1 Champion; 1966	Succeeded by Willi Kauhsen
