= Cooper T52 =

Formula Junior racing car

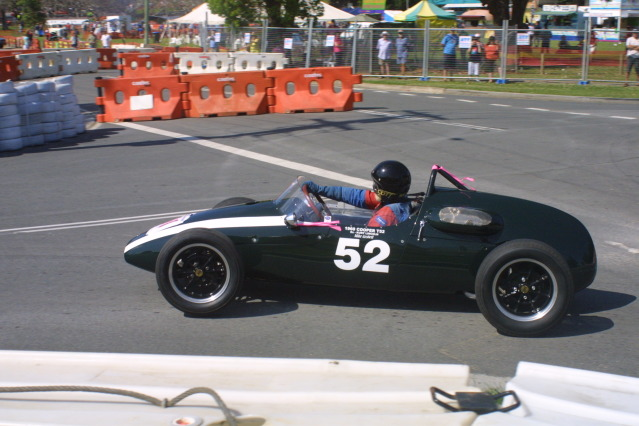
Cooper T52

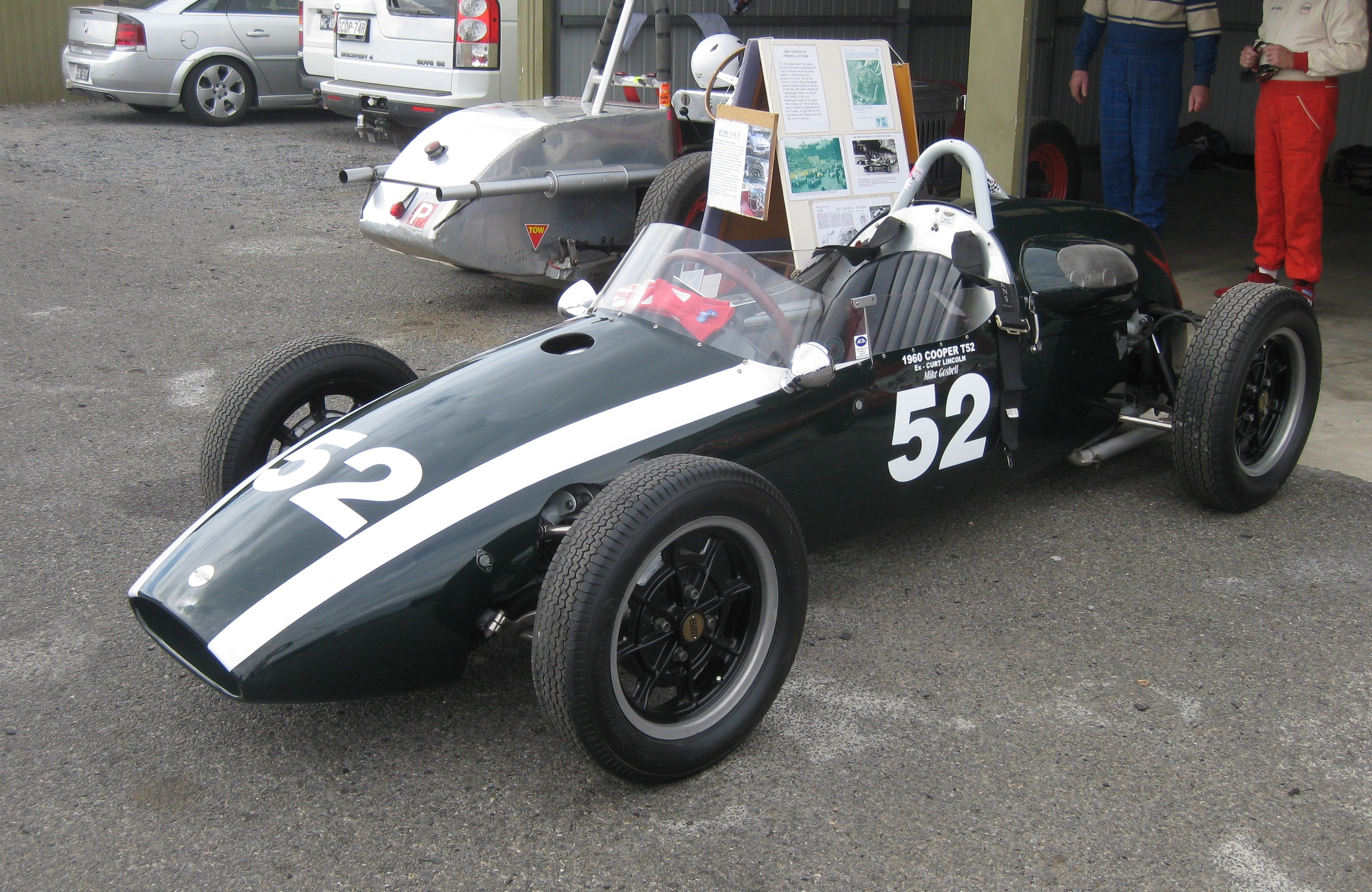
Cooper T52 Formula Junior

The Cooper T52 was the first series of Formula Junior racing cars produced by the Cooper Car Company, built for the 1960 racing season. Its chassis frame comprised four longitudinal tubes with hoops at the cowl and behind the driver. Unequal length A arms supported the car with coil springs at the front and a transverse leaf spring at the rear. BMC provided the power-plant with the 'A' series engine married to a Citroën box. John Surtees debuted on four wheels in a Cooper T52 at Goodwood in March 1960 when he came second to Jim Clark. The T52 was often outpaced by the Lotus 18 but Henry Taylor managed to win the prestigious Monaco Cup and the Albi Grand Prix driving a MKI Formula Junior T52.
