= Carroll Smith =

American racing driver

Carroll Smith (1932–2003) was a successful professional race car driver, engineer, and author. Carroll's books are highly regarded among racing drivers and engineers around the world. He was representative of the club racing spirit: learning a craft and bringing together several disciplines in order to participate in a dangerous and often misunderstood sport.

== Biography ==
Born in Oswego, New York and raised in the northeast United States, Smith began racing MGs while attending the University of Rochester. Entering SCCA events in Pensacola, Florida, at the time, he was enlisted in the US Navy.

Smith moved to Europe where he befriended John Cooper. Driving a Formula Junior Cooper, he won his first race. After waning success in the Cooper cars, followed by a characteristically clear-eyed personal assessment that he lacked the ability to drive race cars at the highest levels, he returned to the United States and began working with Carroll Shelby and the Ford Motor Company on the GT40 Le Mans program. Smith oversaw the preparation on the cars that won the 1966 and 1967 24 Hours of Le Mans.

After winning Le Mans with the GT40 cars from 1966 to 1969 (inclusive), FIA rules changes caused Ford to cancel the GT40 program. Smith moved to work with American Under-2.5 Liter Trans-Am champion Tony Adamowicz to work on his F5000 car in 1969. Smith led the team to the championship that year. In his many writings, Adamowicz credits Smith with successfully focusing his driving and tuning efforts.

After that victory, Smith began working on Prepare to Win. Smith later consulted for the Ferrari Formula One team and in 1977 he was team manager for the Moffat Ford Dealer Team in Australia; the team winning both the Australian Touring Car Championship and the Bathurst 1000 endurance race. In later life Smith exercised his interest in racing by running vintage cars. Carroll was an active and avid Society of Automotive Engineers member.

Smith succumbed to pancreatic cancer in May 2003 at his home in northern California, leaving his daughter Dana, his son Christopher, and his fiancée Ginger. Carroll's first wife, Jane, died on October 15, 1994, after a fall from a balcony in their home while she was gardening. Carroll himself notes: "She went doing what she liked best, enjoying the ocean view and gardening...secure in the love of her family and friends and in the respect of her co-workers and students."

Smith's books were well received by drivers and mechanics alike because of their affable, direct, and clear writing style. After writing a series of books about different aspects of racing car preparation, tuning and engineering practice, each with ... to Win in the title, he wrote the Nuts, Bolts, Fasteners, and Plumbing Handbook about the fasteners and plumbing parts often used in cars. When Smith announced the forthcoming book, he proclaimed his intent to title it Screw to Win, which (he claimed) the publisher then disallowed. His readers and fans refer to the book by just that title. For a while, he gave out Screw to Win autographed stickers to cover up the title.

== Publications ==
- Smith, Carrol (1975). Prepare to Win. ISBN 0-9651600-3-3.
- —— (1978). Tune to Win. ISBN 0-87938-071-3.
- —— (1985). Engineer to Win. ISBN 0-87938-186-8.
- —— (1990). Nuts, Bolts, Fasteners, and Plumbing Handbook. ISBN 0-87938-406-9.
- —— (1996). Drive to Win. ISBN 0-9651600-0-9.
- —— (1998). Carroll Smith's Engineer in Your Pocket. ISBN 0-9651600-1-7.
- Smith, Carrol (2004). Racing Chassis and Suspension Design. Society of Automotive Engineers . ISBN 9780768011203.
