= Roberto Lippi =

Italian racing driver (1926–2011)

- Born: 17 October 1926; Rome, Italy
- Died: 31 October 2011 (aged 85); Anzio, Italy

Formula One World Championship career
- Nationality: (Italy) Italian
- Active years: 1961–1963
- Team: non-works De Tomaso
- Entries: 3 (1 start)
- Championships: 0
- Wins: 0
- Podiums: 0
- Career points: 0
- Pole positions: 0
- Fastest laps: 0
- First entry: 1961 Italian Grand Prix
- Last entry: 1963 Italian Grand Prix

Roberto Lippi (17 October 1926 – 31 October 2011) was a racing driver from Italy. He was the inaugural champion of the Campionato Italiano for Formula Junior cars in 1958, and participated in three Formula One World Championship Grands Prix, all at Monza in a privateer De Tomaso, from 1961 to 1963. He qualified only for the first of these, and scored no championship points.

Lippi had a best non-championship finish of fourth, achieved at the 1963 Rome Grand Prix. Lippi also competed in multiple editions of the Mille Miglia in the 1950s, as well as the 24 Hours of Le Mans in 1957.

From 1964 to 1972, Lippi was chief test driver for the Scuderia Ferrari. He later worked as a racing instructor, primarily at his home track of Vallelunga, before retiring in 1998. He died on 31 October 2011 at age 85, after a long illness.

== Racing record ==
=== Complete 24 Hours of Le Mans results ===
Year	Team	Co-Drivers	Car	Class	Laps	Pos.	Class Pos.
1957	(Italy) Automobili Stanguellini	(Italy) Francesco Siracusa	Stanguellini S1100 Prototipo	S 1.1	67	DNF	DNF

=== Complete Formula One World Championship results ===
(key)

Year	Entrant	Chassis	Engine	1	2	3	4	5	6	7	8	9	10	WDC	Points
1961	Scuderia Settecolli	De Tomaso F1	O.S.C.A. Straight-4	MON	NED	BEL	FRA	GBR	GER	ITA; Ret	USA			NC	0
1962	Scuderia Settecolli	De Tomaso F1	O.S.C.A. Straight-4	NED	MON	BEL	FRA	GBR	GER	ITA; DNQ	USA	RSA		NC	0
1963	Scuderia Settecolli	De Tomaso F1	Ferrari V6	MON	BEL	NED	FRA	GBR	GER	ITA; DNQ	USA	MEX	RSA	NC	0
