= Campionato Italiano =

Formula Junior car championship in Italy

- Category: Formula Junior
- Country: Italy
- Inaugural season: 1958
- Folded: 1963
- Last Drivers' champion: (Italy) ”Geki”
- Last Teams' champion: (Italy) Scuderia Madunina

The Campionato Italiano (Italian Championship) was a domestic championship which took place in Italy for between 1958 and 1963, for Formula Junior cars. From 1964 onwards, the championship ran Formula Three specification cars instead.

== History ==
Formula Junior was the traditionally been regarded as the first major stepping stone for F1 hopefuls, before the introduction of Formula Three - it is typically the first point in a driver's career at which most drivers in the series are aiming at professional careers in racing rather than being amateurs and enthusiasts.

Most notably in the latter years of the Campionato Italiano, it was dominated by one driver, who won three successive titles. Between 1961 and 1963, ”Geki”, won three titles, before taking the first Italian Formula Three title the following season, in 1964

== Champions ==
Season	Champion	Team	Car
1958	(Italy) Roberto Lippi	Scuderia Bardahl	Bardahl-Stanguellini-Fiat
1959	(Italy) Raffaele Cammarota	Scuderia Bardahl	Stanguellini-Fiat
1960	(Italy) Renato Pirocchi	Scuderia Pescara	Stanguellini-Fiat
1961	(Italy) "Geki"	Scuderia Madunina	Stanguellini-Fiat; Lotus-Ford 18
1962	(Italy) "Geki"	Scuderia Madunina	Lotus-Ford 18; Lotus-Ford 22
1963	(Italy) "Geki"	Scuderia Madunina; Scuderia Junior Italia	de Sanctis-Ford; Lotus-Ford 27
