= Massimo Natili =

Italian racing driver (1935–2017)

- Born: 28 July 1935; Ronciglione, Kingdom of Italy
- Died: 19 September 2017 (aged 82); Viterbo, Italy

Formula One World Championship career
- Nationality: (Italy) Italian
- Active years: 1961
- Team: Scuderia Centro Sud
- Entries: 2 (1 start)
- Championships: 0
- Wins: 0
- Podiums: 0
- Career points: 0
- Pole positions: 0
- Fastest laps: 0
- First entry: 1961 British Grand Prix
- Last entry: 1961 Italian Grand Prix

Massimo Natili (28 July 1935 – 19 September 2017) was a racing driver from Italy. He participated in two Formula One World Championship Grands Prix, debuting on 15 July 1961. He scored no championship points.

== Career ==
Natili started in Formula One with Scuderia Centro Sud in 1961 with a retirement from the Syracuse Grand Prix, followed by a failure to qualify for the Naples Grand Prix. He retired on the first lap of the 1961 British Grand Prix with gearbox failure, and practiced for the Italian Grand Prix but did not start.

In 1962, Natili was involved in a fiery accident in a Formula Junior race at Monza, and was rescued by an anonymous spectator. He came 4th in the 1964 Rome Grand Prix after retiring from the previous year's event, and subsequently competed in Italian Formula 3.

== Complete Formula One World Championship results ==
(key)

Year	Entrant	Chassis	Engine	1	2	3	4	5	6	7	8	WDC	Points
1961	Scuderia Centro Sud	Cooper T51	Maserati Straight-4	MON	NED	BEL	FRA	GBR; Ret	GER	ITA; DNS	USA	NC	0

== 24 Hours of Le Mans results ==
Year	Team	Co-Drivers	Car	Class	Laps	Pos.	Class Pos.
1966	(Italy) Prototipo Bizzarrini	(United States) Sam Posey	Bizzarrini P538 Super America	P +5.0	39	DSQ	DSQ
