= Geki (racing driver) =

Italian racing driver (1937–1967)

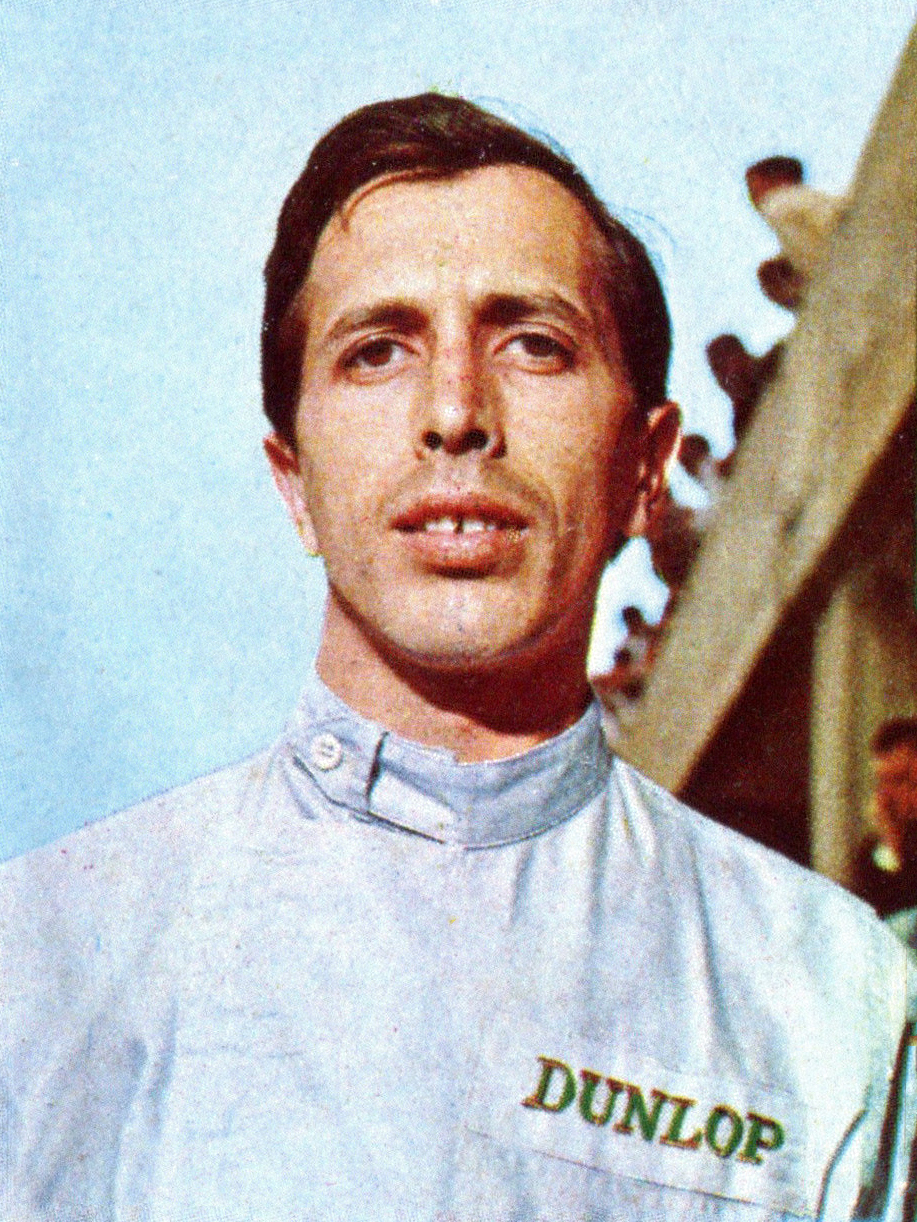
- Giacomo Russo c. 1966
- Born: 23 October 1937; Milan, Italy
- Died: 18 June 1967 (aged 29); Caserta, Italy

Formula One World Championship career
- Nationality: (Italy) Italian
- Active years: 1964–1966
- Team: Lotus (including non-works)
- Entries: 3 (2 starts)
- Championships: 0
- Wins: 0
- Podiums: 0
- Career points: 0
- Pole positions: 0
- Fastest laps: 0
- First entry: 1964 Italian Grand Prix
- Last entry: 1966 Italian Grand Prix

"Geki" was the racing pseudonym of Giacomo Russo (23 October 1937 – 18 June 1967), who was a racing driver from Italy. An experienced driver in the Italian lower formulae, he also participated in three Formula One Italian Grands Prix from 1964 to 1966, failing to qualify for the 1964 race, driving a Brabham for Rob Walker. For his two Grand Prix starts, he drove for Team Lotus. He scored no championship points.

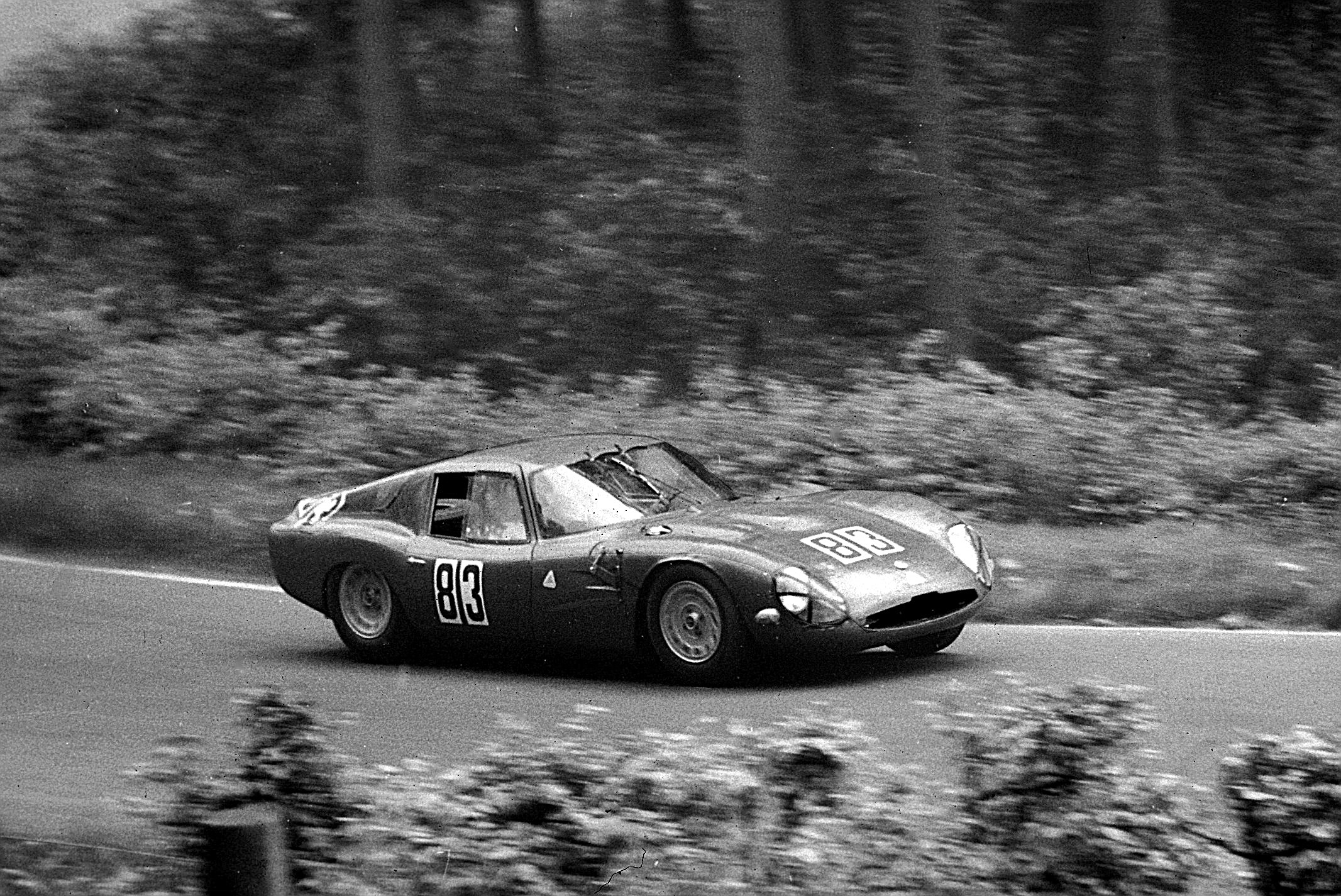
Alfa Romeo TZ 2, Andrea de Adamich and Giacomo Russo in Hatzenbach section 1000km Nürburgring 1965; 17th overall, winner of the GT class up to 1.6 litres, 40 laps in 7: 00: 53.400 hours

Geki was a four-time Italian Formula Three series champion, winning consecutive championships from 1961 to 1964.

He was killed in an accident in an Italian Formula Three race at Caserta in 1967. After an accident involving Beat Fehr, Andrea Saltari and Franco Foresti, Fehr ran down the track to warn the oncoming racers of the damaged cars and oil on the track ahead. The next group of cars included Geki, Massimo Natili, Jürg Dubler, Romano "Tiger" Perdomi and Corrado Manfredini, who were unable to avoid colliding with the wreckage on the track. Geki's Matra then crashed into a wall, and he was killed instantly. Fehr was struck by one of the cars and was also killed, and Perdomi died in hospital eight days later.

== Complete Formula One results ==
(key)

Year	Entrant	Chassis	Engine	1	2	3	4	5	6	7	8	9	10	WDC	Points
1964	Rob Walker Racing Team	Brabham BT11	BRM V8	MON	NED	BEL	FRA	GBR	GER	AUT	ITA; DNQ	USA	MEX	NC	0
1965	Team Lotus	Lotus 25	Climax V8	RSA	MON	BEL	FRA	GBR	NED	GER	ITA; Ret	USA	MEX	NC	0
1966	Team Lotus	Lotus 33	Climax V8	MON	BEL	FRA	GBR	NED	GER	ITA; 9	USA	MEX		NC	0

Sporting positions
Preceded by Inaugural	Italian Formula Three Championship; Champion; 1964	Succeeded by Andrea de Adamich
