= Renato Pirocchi =

Italian racing driver (1933–2002)

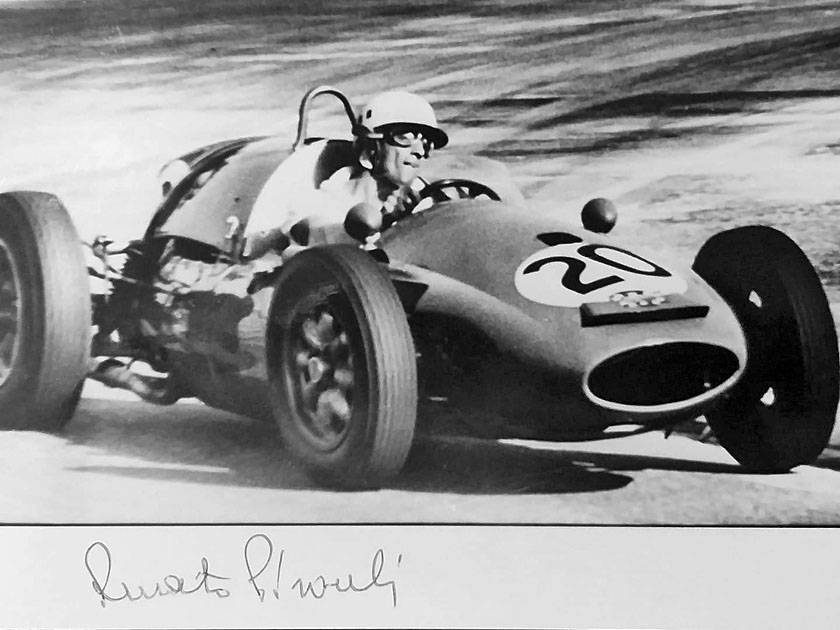
- Pirocchi at 1961 Modena Grand Prix
- Born: 26 March 1933; Notaresco, Italy
- Died: 29 July 2002 (aged 69); Chieti, Italy

Formula One World Championship career
- Nationality: (Italy) Italian
- Active years: 1961
- Team: Non-works Cooper
- Entries: 1
- Championships: 0
- Wins: 0
- Podiums: 0
- Career points: 0
- Pole positions: 0
- Fastest laps: 0
- First entry: 1961 Italian Grand Prix

Renato Pirocchi (26 March 1933 – 29 July 2002) was a racing driver from Italy. He participated in one Formula One World Championship Grand Prix, the 1961 Italian Grand Prix on September 10, 1961. He qualified in 29th position (out of 33) and finished 12th, five laps behind, scoring no championship points.

After a successful time in Formula Junior at the turn of the 1960s, Pirocchi participated in several non-Championship Formula One races during the 1961 season, but often failed to qualify. He finished 12th at Syracuse, and shared a drive to 11th place at Zeltweg with Lorenzo Bandini, but was many laps adrift on both occasions.

== Complete Formula One World Championship results ==
(key)

Year	Entrant	Chassis	Engine	1	2	3	4	5	6	7	8	WDC	Points
1961	Pescara Racing Club	Cooper T45	Maserati Straight-4	MON	NED	BEL	FRA	GBR	GER; DNA			NC	0
1961	Pescara Racing Club	Cooper T51	Maserati Straight-4							ITA; 12	USA	NC	0

== Sources ==
- Steve Small, The Grand Prix Who's Who, 1995.
- John Thompson, The Formula One Record Book, 1974.
