= 1957 BRDC International Trophy =

- Non-championship race in the 1957 Formula One season
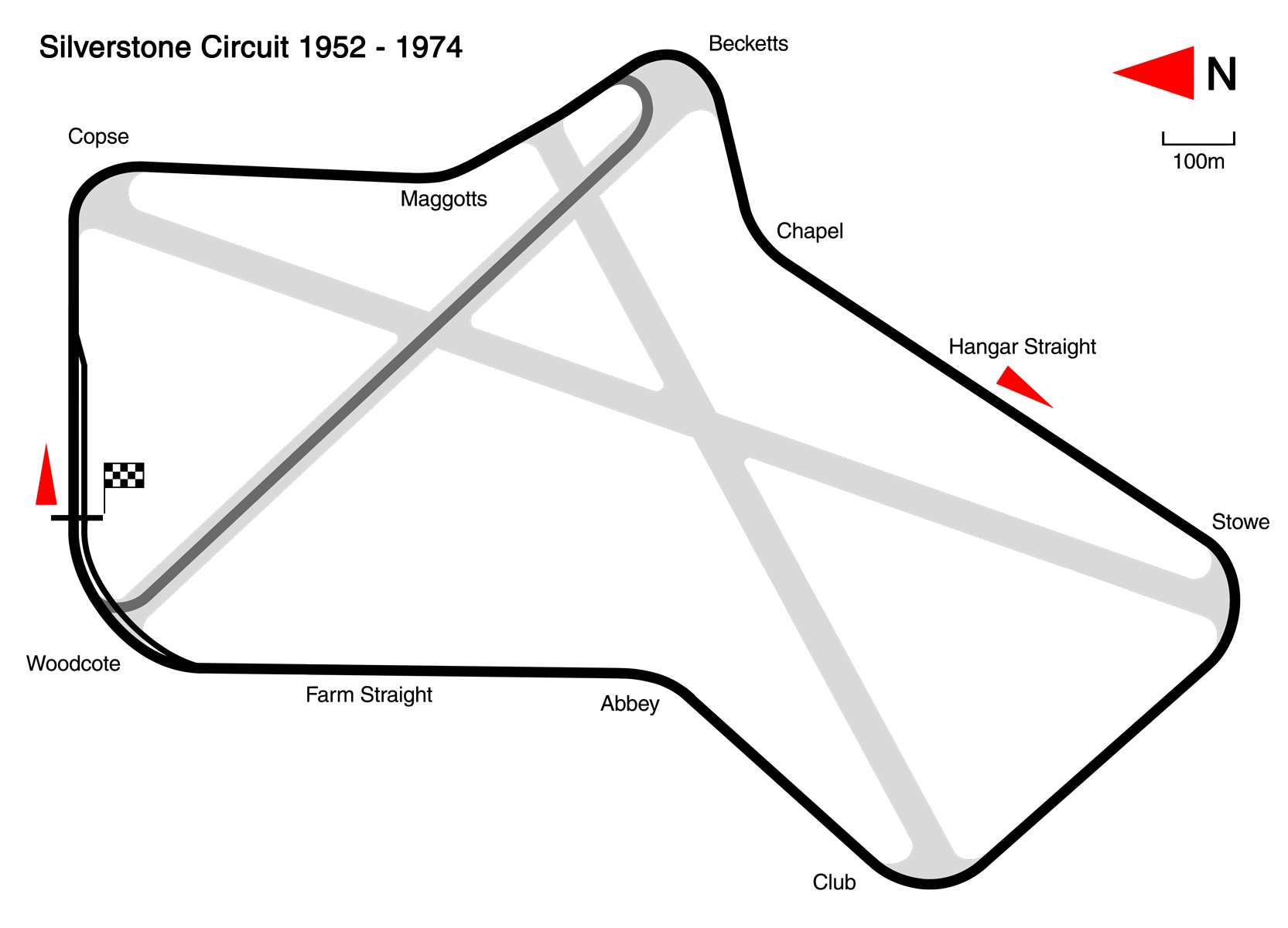

Race details
- Date: 14 September 1957
- Official name: IX BRDC International Trophy
- Location: Silverstone Circuit, Northamptonshire
- Course: Permanent racing facility
- Course length: 4.71 km (2.93 miles)
- Distance: 2 x 15 lap heats and final of 35 laps, 164.87 km (102.44 miles)

Pole position
| Driver | (France) Jean Behra | BRM |
- Grid positions set by heat results

Fastest lap
| Driver | (France) Jean Behra | BRM |
- Time: 1:43.0

Podium
| First | (France) Jean Behra | BRM |
| Second | (United States) Harry Schell | BRM |
| Third | (United Kingdom) Ron Flockhart | BRM |

The 9th BRDC International Trophy – formally the International Daily Express Trophy – was a motor race, run to Formula One rules, held on 14 September 1957 at Silverstone Circuit, Northamptonshire. The race was run over two 15 lap heats and a 35 lap final, and was won by French driver Jean Behra in a BRM P25.

The field also included several Formula Two cars, highest finisher being Roy Salvadori in a Cooper T43, finishing in eighth place overall.

== Results ==
=== Entry list ===
Note: a blue background indicates a car running under Formula 2 regulations.

| No. | Driver | Entrant | Constructor | Notes |
|---|---|---|---|---|
| 1 | (Sweden) Jo Bonnier | Scuderia Centro Sud | Maserati 250F | |
| 2 | (United States) Masten Gregory | Scuderia Centro Sud | Maserati 250F | |
| 3 | (United Kingdom) Stirling Moss | Vandervell Products Ltd | Vanwall | DNA |
| 4 | (United Kingdom) Tony Brooks | Vandervell Products Ltd | Vanwall | DNA |
| 5 | (United Kingdom) Stuart Lewis-Evans | Vandervell Products Ltd | Vanwall | DNA |
| 6 | (France) Jean Behra | Owen Racing Organisation | BRM P25 | |
| 7 | (United States) Harry Schell | Owen Racing Organisation | BRM P25 | |
| 8 | (United Kingdom) Ron Flockhart | Owen Racing Organisation | BRM P25 | |
| 9 | (United Kingdom) Ivor Bueb | Gilby Engineering | Maserati 250F | |
| 10 | (United Kingdom) Tony Brooks | R.R.C. Walker Racing Team | Cooper T43-Climax | |
| 11 | (United Kingdom) Jimmy Stewart | Jimmy Stewart | Cooper T23-Bristol | |
| 12 | (United Kingdom) Bob Gerard | F.R. Gerard | Cooper-BG T43-Bristol | |
| 14 | (Australia) Jack Brabham^{2} | Cooper Car Company | Cooper T43-Climax | |
| 14 | (United Kingdom) Roy Salvadori^{1} | Cooper Car Company | Cooper T43-Climax | DNA |
| 15 | (United Kingdom) Horace Gould | Horace Gould | Maserati 250F | |
| 16 | (France) Marc Rozier | Marc Rozier | Ferrari 500/625 | |
| 17 | (United Kingdom) Bruce Halford | Bruce Halford | Maserati 250F | |
| 18 | (United Kingdom) Geoff Richardson | Geoff Richardson | RRA-Jaguar | |
| 19 | (United Kingdom) Les Leston | Les Leston | Cooper T43-Climax | |
| 20 | (United Kingdom) Dennis Taylor | Dennis Taylor | Lotus 12-Climax | |
| 21 | (New Zealand) Ronnie Moore | Kiwi Equipe | Cooper T43-Climax | |
| 22 | (New Zealand) Raymond Thackwell | Kiwi Equipe | Cooper T43-Climax | |
| 23 | (Australia) Paul England | Ridgeway Managements | Cooper T41-Climax | DNA |
| 24 | (United Kingdom) Dick Gibson | Dick Gibson | Cooper T43-Climax | |
| 25 | (United Kingdom) Tony Marsh | Ridgeway Managements | Cooper T43-Climax | |
| 26 | (United Kingdom) Jack Fairman | R.R.C. Walker Racing Team | Cooper T43-Climax | |
| 26 | (United Kingdom) Mike Anthony | R.R.C. Walker Racing Team | Cooper T43-Climax | DNA |
| 27 | (United Kingdom) Noel Cunningham-Reid | R.R.C. Walker Racing Team | Cooper T41-Climax | |
| 28 | (United Kingdom) George Wicken | George Wicken | Cooper T43-Climax | |
| 29 | (United Kingdom) Brian Naylor | JB Naylor | Cooper T43-Climax | |
| 30 | (United Kingdom) Keith Hall | Team Lotus | Lotus 12-Climax | |
| 31 | (United Kingdom) Cliff Allison | Team Lotus | Lotus 12-Climax | |
| 32 | (United Kingdom) Henry Taylor | Team Lotus | Lotus 12-Climax | |
| 32 | (United Kingdom) Colin Chapman | Team Lotus | Lotus 12-Climax | DNA |
| 33 | (United Kingdom) Ian Burgess | Cooper Car Company | Cooper T43-Climax | |
| 34 | (United Kingdom) Graham Hill^{3} | Cooper Car Company | Cooper T43-Climax | |
| 34 | (Australia) Jack Brabham^{2} | Cooper Car Company | Cooper T43-Climax | DNA |
| 35 | (United Kingdom) Roy Salvadori^{1} | Cooper Car Company | Cooper T43-Climax | |
| 35 | (United Kingdom) John Cooper | Cooper Car Company | Cooper T43-Climax | DNA |
| 36 | (United Kingdom) Graham Hill^{3} | John Willment (Automobiles) | Willment-Climax | DNA |
| 37 | (United Kingdom) Innes Ireland | Equipe Endeavour | Cooper T43-Climax | |
| 38 | (United Kingdom) Jim Russell | Alan Brown | Cooper T43-Climax | |
| 39 | (United Kingdom) Archie Scott-Brown | Lister Engineering | Lister-Climax | |
| 40 | (Argentina) Alejandro de Tomaso | O.S.C.A. | OSCA F2 | |

Notes:

^{1}Roy Salvadori drove the works' Cooper number 35, which had been entered for John Cooper, who did not take part.

^{2}Jack Brabham drove car number 14 in place of Salvadori.

^{3}Graham Hill drove car number 34 in place of Brabham.

=== Heats ===
| Heat 1 | Driver | Time/Retired | Grid | Time | Heat 2 | Driver | Time/Retired | Grid | Time |
|---|---|---|---|---|---|---|---|---|---|
| 1 | Behra | 25:28.8 | 2 | 1:44.6 | 1 | Schell | 26:58.0 | 1 | 1:44.8 |
| 2 | Flockhart | 26:42.2 | 3 | 1:46.0 | 2 | Brabham | 27:05.0 | 15 | no time |
| 3 | Gregory | 26:50.2 | 4 | 1:47.0 | 3 | Bonnier | 27:08.0 | 14 | no time |
| 4 | Gould | 27:31.6 | 15 | 1:53.6 | 4 | Bueb | 27:58.0 | 3 | 1:50.4 |
| 5 | Halford | 27:35.6 | 6 | 1:49.0 | 5 | Wicken | 28:02.0 | 4 | 1:51.2 |
| 6 | Ireland | 14 laps | 11 | 1:52.0 | 6 | Fairman^{1} | 28:07.0 | 6 | 1:51.4 |
| 7 | Marsh | 14 laps | 8 | 1:51.2 | 7 | H. Taylor^{2} | 28:52.0 | 5 | 1:51.2 |
| 8 | Leston | 14 laps | 14 | 1:53.0 | 8 | Hill | 28:52.0 | 16 | no time |
| 9 | Cunningham-Reid | 14 laps | 12 | 1:52.8 | 9 | D. Taylor | 14 laps | 7 | 1:52.0 |
| 10 | Gerard | 14 laps | 10 | 1:51.8 | 10 | Russell | 14 laps | 9 | 1:52.2 |
| 11 | Burgess | 14 laps | 9 | 1:51.6 | 11 | Thackwell | 14 laps | 10 | 2:00.0 |
| 12 | Salvadori | 14 laps | 5 | 1:48.0 | 12 | Gibson | 14 laps | 13 | 2:12.8 |
| 13 | Moore | 13 laps | 17 | 1:59.8 | 13 | Stewart | 14 laps | 11 | 2:00.2 |
| DNF | Allison | 9 laps | 7 | 1:50.0 | DNF | Richardson | Oil pressure | 8 | 1:52.2 |
| DNF | Naylor | | 13 | 1:53.0 | DNF | Rozier | | 12 | 2:10.0 |
| DNF | Brooks | 0 laps - crown wheel & pinion | 1 | 1:43.0 | DNF | Hall | 2 laps | 2 | 1:48.6 |
| DNS | Scott-Brown | Oil pressure | 16 | 1:54.0 | DNF | de Tomaso | 1 lap - crash | 17 | no time |

Notes:

^{1} Tony Brooks took over Fairman's car in order to qualify for the final

^{2} Cliff Allison took over Taylor's car in order to qualify for the final

=== Final ===
Note: a blue background indicates a car running under Formula 2 regulations.

| Pos. | No. | Driver | Car | Time/Retired | Grid |
|---|---|---|---|---|---|
| 1 | 6 | (France) Jean Behra | BRM P25 | 1h01m30.0, 160.87 km/h | 1 |
| 2 | 7 | (United States) Harry Schell | BRM P25 | 1h03m00.0 (+1m30s) | 4 |
| 3 | 8 | (United Kingdom) Ron Flockhart | BRM P25 | 1h03m06.0 (+1m36s) | 2 |
| 4 | 1 | (Sweden) Jo Bonnier | Maserati 250F | 1h03m07.0 (+1m37s) | 6 |
| 5 | 2 | (United States) Masten Gregory | Maserati 250F | 34 laps | 3 |
| 6 | 15 | (United Kingdom) Horace Gould | Maserati 250F | 34 laps | 7 |
| 7 | 17 | (United Kingdom) Bruce Halford | Maserati 250F | 34 laps | 8 |
| 8 | 35 | (United Kingdom) Roy Salvadori | Cooper T43-Climax | 34 laps | 21 |
| 9 | 9 | (United Kingdom) Ivor Bueb | Maserati 250F | 33 laps | 10 |
| 10 | 28 | (United Kingdom) George Wicken | Cooper T43-Climax | 33 laps | 12 |
| 11 | 25 | (United Kingdom) Tony Marsh | Cooper T43-Climax | 33 laps | 11 |
| 12 | 27 | (United Kingdom) Noel Cunningham-Reid | Cooper T41-Climax | 33 laps | 15 |
| 13 | 36 | (United Kingdom) Graham Hill | Cooper T43-Climax | 33 laps | 18 |
| 14 | 12 | (United Kingdom) Bob Gerard | Cooper BGT43-Bristol | 32 laps | 16 |
| 15 | 19 | (United Kingdom) Les Leston | Cooper T43-Climax | 32 laps | 14 |
| 16 | 24 | (United Kingdom) Dick Gibson | Cooper T43-Climax | 31 laps | 24 |
| 17 | 21 | (New Zealand) Ronnie Moore | Cooper T43-Climax | 31 laps | 26 |
| 18 | 11 | (United Kingdom) Jimmy Stewart | Cooper T23-Bristol | 31 laps | 25 |
| DNF | 32 | (United Kingdom) Cliff Allison | Lotus 12-Climax | 30 laps - crash | 17 |
| DNF | 20 | (United Kingdom) Dennis Taylor | Lotus 12-Climax | ? | 19 |
| DNF | 33 | (United Kingdom) Ian Burgess | Cooper T43-Climax | engine | 20 |
| DNF | 14 | (Australia) Jack Brabham | Cooper T43-Climax | 22 laps - oil pipe | 5 |
| DNF | 37 | (United Kingdom) Innes Ireland | Cooper T43-Climax | half-shaft | 9 |
| DNF | 38 | (United Kingdom) Jim Russell | Cooper T43-Climax | mechanical | 22 |
| DNF | 22 | (New Zealand) Raymond Thackwell | Cooper T43-Climax | oil pressure | 23 |
| DNF | 26 | (United Kingdom) Tony Brooks | Cooper T43-Climax | valve | 13 |

| Previous race: 1957 Caen Grand Prix | Formula One non-championship races 1957 season | Next race: 1957 Modena Grand Prix |
| Previous race: 1956 BRDC International Trophy | BRDC International Trophy | Next race: 1958 BRDC International Trophy |
