= 1958 BRDC International Trophy =

- Non-championship race in the 1958 Formula One season
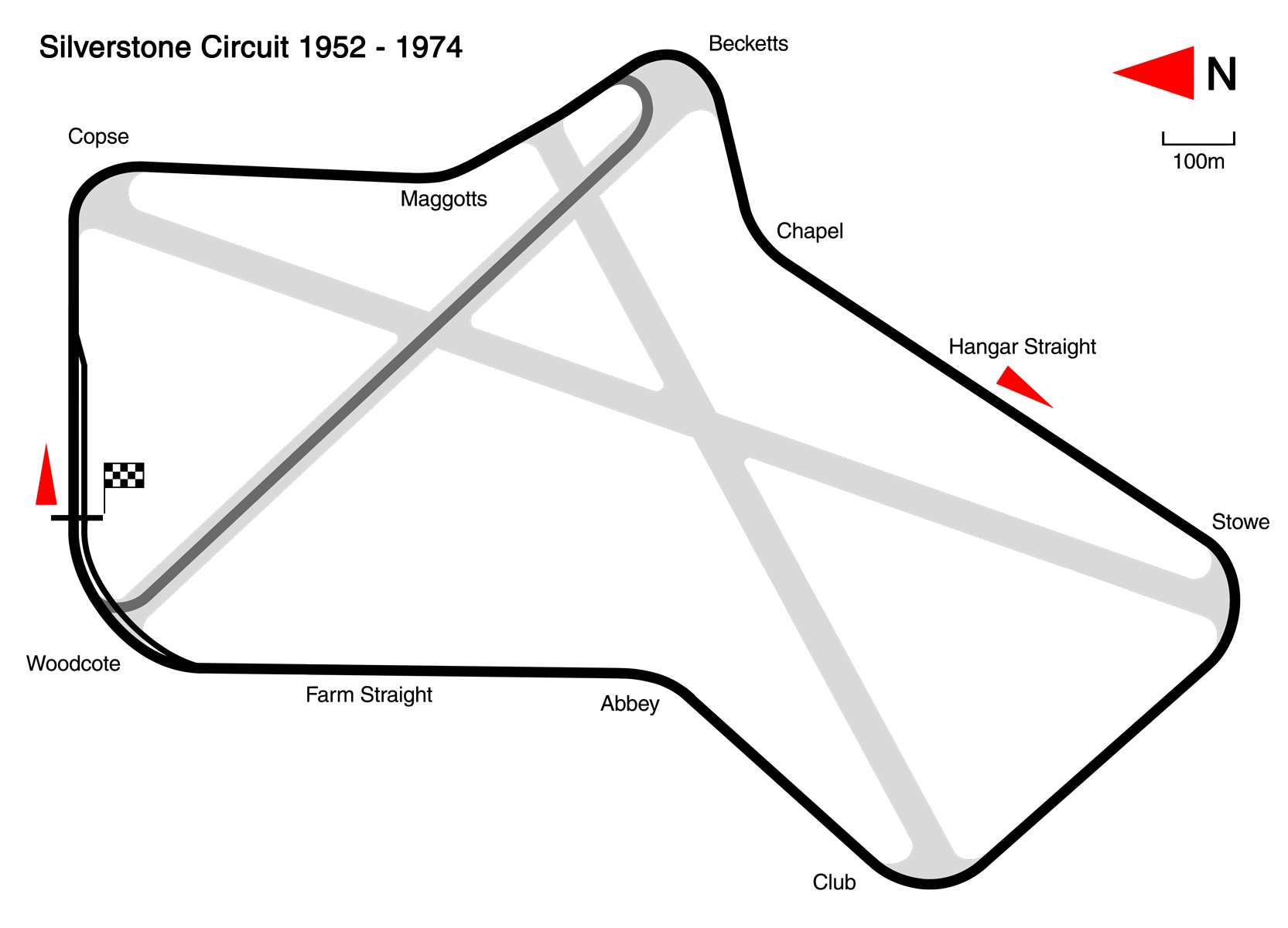

Race details
- Date: 3 May 1958
- Official name: X BRDC International Trophy
- Location: Silverstone Circuit, Northamptonshire
- Course: Permanent racing facility
- Course length: 4.71 km (2.93 miles)
- Distance: 50 laps, 235.7 km (146.5 miles)

Pole position
Driver	(United Kingdom) Roy Salvadori	Cooper-Climax
- Time: 1:40.8

Fastest lap
Drivers	(France) Jean Behra	BRM
	(United Kingdom) Peter Collins	Ferrari
- Time: 1:40.0

Podium
First	(United Kingdom) Peter Collins	Ferrari
Second	(United Kingdom) Roy Salvadori	Cooper-Climax
Third	(United States) Masten Gregory	Maserati

The 10th BRDC International Trophy, also known as The Daily Express Trophy (named after the principal sponsor of the race), was a motor race, run to Formula One rules, held on 3 May 1958 at the Silverstone Circuit, England. The race was run over 50 laps of the Grand Prix circuit, and was won by British driver Peter Collins in a Ferrari Dino 246.

The field also included several Formula Two cars, highest finisher being Cliff Allison in a Lotus 12, finishing in sixth place overall.

== Results ==
Note: a blue background indicates a car running under Formula 2 regulations.

Pos	No.	Driver	Entrant	Constructor	Time/Retired	Grid
1	9	(United Kingdom) Peter Collins	Scuderia Ferrari	Ferrari Dino 246	1h 26m 14.6s, 163.88 km/h	4
2	5	(United Kingdom) Roy Salvadori	Cooper Car Company	Cooper T45-Climax	1h 26m 38.0s (+23.4s)	1
3	3	(United States) Masten Gregory	Scuderia Centro Sud	Maserati 250F	1h 26m 51.0s (+36.4s)	10
4	1	(France) Jean Behra	Owen Racing Organisation	BRM P25	1h 27m 27.0s (+1m 12.4s)	5
5	6	(Australia) Jack Brabham	Cooper Car Company	Cooper T45-Climax	49 laps	2
6	18	(United Kingdom) Cliff Allison	Team Lotus	Lotus 12-Climax	49 laps	8
7	21	(United Kingdom) Stuart Lewis-Evans	British Racing Partnership	Cooper T45-Climax	49 laps	9
8	17	(United Kingdom) Graham Hill	Team Lotus	Lotus 12-Climax	49 laps	7
9	29	(New Zealand) Bruce McLaren	Bruce McLaren	Cooper T45-Climax	48 laps	23
10	22	(United Kingdom) Jim Russell	Jim Russell	Cooper T45-Climax	48 laps	16
11	27	(United Kingdom) Ian Burgess	High Efficiency Motors	Cooper T43-Climax	47 laps	18
12	15	(United Kingdom) Geoff Richardson	Geoff Richardson	Connaught Type B-Alta	47 laps	19
13	31	(United States) Bruce Kessler	Alan Brown Equipe	Cooper T43-Climax	46 laps	21
14	24	(United Kingdom) Tony Marsh	Tony Marsh	Cooper T45-Climax	46 laps	24
15	32	(United Kingdom) Dennis Taylor	Dennis Taylor	Lotus 12-Climax	46 laps	28
16	14	(United Kingdom) Bruce Halford	Bruce Halford	Maserati 250F	46 laps	14
17	4	(Germany) Wolfgang Seidel	Scuderia Centro Sud	Maserati 250F	45 laps	27
18	12	(Australia) Ken Kavanagh	Ken Kavanagh	Maserati 250F	45 laps	26
19	28	(United Kingdom) George Wicken	George Wicken	Cooper T43-Climax	43 laps	17
20	16	(Australia) Steve Ouvaroff	Count S Ouvaroff	Cooper T43-Climax	43 laps	32
Ret.	33	(United Kingdom) Ivor Bueb	Ecurie Demi Litre	Lotus 12-Climax	20 laps - overheating	12
Ret.	2	(United Kingdom) Ron Flockhart	Owen Racing Organisation	BRM P25	Accident	6
Ret.	7	(United Kingdom) Stirling Moss	Rob Walker Racing	Cooper T43-Climax	18 laps - gearbox	3
Ret.	10	(Italy) Giorgio Scarlatti	Giorgio Scarlatti	Maserati 250F	Rear suspension	20
Ret.	11	(Sweden) Jo Bonnier	Joakim Bonnier	Maserati 250F	Rear suspension	13
Ret.	19	(United Kingdom) Dick Gibson	Dick Gibson	Cooper T43-Climax	Gearbox	31
Ret.	20	(United Kingdom) Bob Gerard	Bob Gerard	Cooper T44-Bristol		25
Ret.	23	(New Zealand) Raymond Thackwell	Kiwi Equipe	Cooper T43-Climax		30
Ret.	25	(New Zealand) Ronnie Moore	Kiwi Equipe	Cooper T43-Climax		29
Ret.	26	(United Kingdom) David Shale	S&W Motors	Cooper T43-Climax	Brakes	33
Ret.	30	(United Kingdom) Tony Brooks	Rob Walker Racing	Cooper T43-Climax	Engine	11
Ret.	34	(United Kingdom) Henry Taylor	Nixon's Garage	Cooper T45-Climax	Gearbox	22
Ret.	8	(France) Maurice Trintignant	Rob Walker Racing	Cooper T45-Climax	Overheating	15
DNS	10	(Italy) Gerino Gerini	Giorgio Scarlatti	Maserati 250F	Car driven by Scarlatti	-
DNA	2	(United States) Harry Schell	Owen Racing Organisation	BRM P25		-
DNA	3	(Italy) Gerino Gerini	Scuderia Centro Sud	Maserati 250F		-
DNA	31	(United Kingdom) Keith Hall	Alan Brown Equipe	Cooper T43-Climax		-
DNA	23	(United Kingdom) Brian Naylor	JB Naylor	Cooper T45-Climax		-

Previous race: 1958 BARC Aintree 200	Formula One non-championship races 1958 season	Next race: 1958 Caen Grand Prix
Previous race: 1957 BRDC International Trophy	BRDC International Trophy	Next race: 1959 BRDC International Trophy
