= 1958 BARC Aintree 200 =

1958 BARC "200"
- Non-championship race in the 1958 Formula One season

Race details
- Date: 19 April 1958
- Official name: XIII BARC "200"
- Location: Aintree Circuit, Merseyside
- Course: Permanent racing facility
- Course length: 4.83 km (3.00 miles)
- Distance: 67 laps, 323.61 km (201.00 miles)

Pole position
Driver	(France) Jean Behra	BRM P25
- Time: 1:59.8

Fastest lap
Driver	(Australia) Jack Brabham	Cooper-Climax
- Time: 2:01.4

Podium
First	(United Kingdom) Stirling Moss	Cooper-Climax
Second	(Australia) Jack Brabham	Cooper-Climax
Third	(United Kingdom) Tony Brooks	Cooper-Climax

The 13th BARC "200" was a motor race, run to Formula One rules, held on 19 April 1958 at the Aintree Circuit, England. The race was run over 67 laps of the circuit, and was won by British driver Stirling Moss in a Cooper T45.

The field also included many Formula Two cars, highest finisher being Tony Brooks who took third place in a Cooper T43.

== Results ==
Note: a blue background indicates a car running under Formula 2 regulations.

Pos	No.	Driver	Entrant	Constructor	Time/Retired	Grid
1	7	(United Kingdom) Stirling Moss	Rob Walker Racing	Cooper T45-Climax	2h 20m 47.0s, 137.87 km/h	3
2	10	(Australia) Jack Brabham	Cooper Car Company	Cooper T45-Climax	2h 20m 47.2s (+0.2s)	4
3	20	(United Kingdom) Tony Brooks	Rob Walker Racing	Cooper T43-Climax	2h 21m 52.2s (+1m 5.2s)	10
4	9	(United Kingdom) Roy Salvadori	Cooper Car Company	Cooper T45-Climax	2h 22m 15.0s (+1m 28.0s)	2
5	22	(United Kingdom) Stuart Lewis-Evans	British Racing Partnership	Cooper T45-Climax	2h 22m 58.0s (+2m 11.0s)	5
6	2	(United States) Harry Schell	Owen Racing Organisation	Cooper T43-Climax	66 laps	14
7	16	(United Kingdom) Graham Hill	Team Lotus	Lotus 12-Climax	66 laps	6
8	17	(United Kingdom) Cliff Allison	Team Lotus	Lotus 12-Climax	66 laps	7
9	5	(United Kingdom) Archie Scott-Brown	Bernie Ecclestone	Connaught Type B-Alta	65 laps	8
10	19	(France) Maurice Trintignant	Rob Walker Racing	Cooper T43-Climax	65 laps	13
11	26	(United Kingdom) Ian Burgess	High Efficiency Motors	Cooper T43-Climax	65 laps	15
12	25	(United Kingdom) Jim Russell	Jim Russell	Cooper T45-Climax	65 laps	19
13	21	(New Zealand) Bruce McLaren	Cooper Car Company	Cooper T45-Climax	64 laps	16
14	6	(United Kingdom) Paul Emery	Bernie Ecclestone	Connaught Type B-Alta	63 laps	18
15	3	(United Kingdom) Geoff Richardson	Geoff Richardson	Connaught Type B-Alta	63 laps	20
16	18	(United Kingdom) Dennis Taylor	Dennis Taylor	Lotus 12-Climax	62 laps	28
Ret.	27	(United Kingdom) Ken Tyrrell	Nixon's Garage	Cooper T45-Climax	62 laps	no time
Ret.	28	(United Kingdom) Ivor Bueb	Ecurie Demi Litre	Cooper T43-Climax	51 laps - accident damage	9
Ret.	24	(United Kingdom) Brian Naylor	JB Naylor	Cooper T45-Climax	37 laps - accident	12
Ret.	29	(United Kingdom) David Shale	S&W Motors	Cooper T43-Climax	33 laps - overheating	25
Ret.	15	(United Kingdom) Keith Campbell	Keith Campbell	Maserati 250F	29 laps - oil pipe	22
Ret.	1	(France) Jean Behra	Owen Racing Organisation	BRM P25	28 laps - brakes	1
Ret.	8	(United Kingdom) Keith Ballisat	Equipe Prideaux	Cooper T43-Climax	26 laps - gearbox	24
Ret.	4	(United Kingdom) Verdun Edwards	Autospeed Garages	Connaught Type B-Alta	21 laps - spin	27
Ret.	14	(Australia) Ken Kavanagh	Ken Kavanagh	Maserati 250F	20 laps - petrol leak	23
Ret.	12	(United Kingdom) Bruce Halford	Bruce Halford	Maserati 250F	15 laps - puncture	11
Ret.	30	(United Kingdom) Tim Parnell	Tim Parnell	Cooper T45-Climax	12 laps suspension	26
Ret.	23	(United Kingdom) George Wicken	George Wicken	Cooper T43-Climax	7 laps - gear change	21
Ret.	31	(United Kingdom) Tony Marsh	Tony Marsh	Cooper T45-Climax	4 laps - mechanical	17
DNA	11	(United Kingdom) Horace Gould	Horace Gould	Maserati 250F		-
DNA	32	(United Kingdom) Jackie Lewis	Jackie Lewis	Cooper T43-Climax	Reserve driver	-
DNA	2	(United States) Harry Schell	Harry Schell	BRM P25	Drove in F2 class	-
DNA	27	(United Kingdom) Henry Taylor	Henry Taylor	Cooper T45-Climax		-

Previous race: 1958 Syracuse Grand Prix	Formula One non-championship races 1958 season	Next race: 1958 BRDC International Trophy
Previous race: 1956 BARC Aintree 200	BARC 200	Next race: 1959 BARC "200"
