= Lotus 16 =

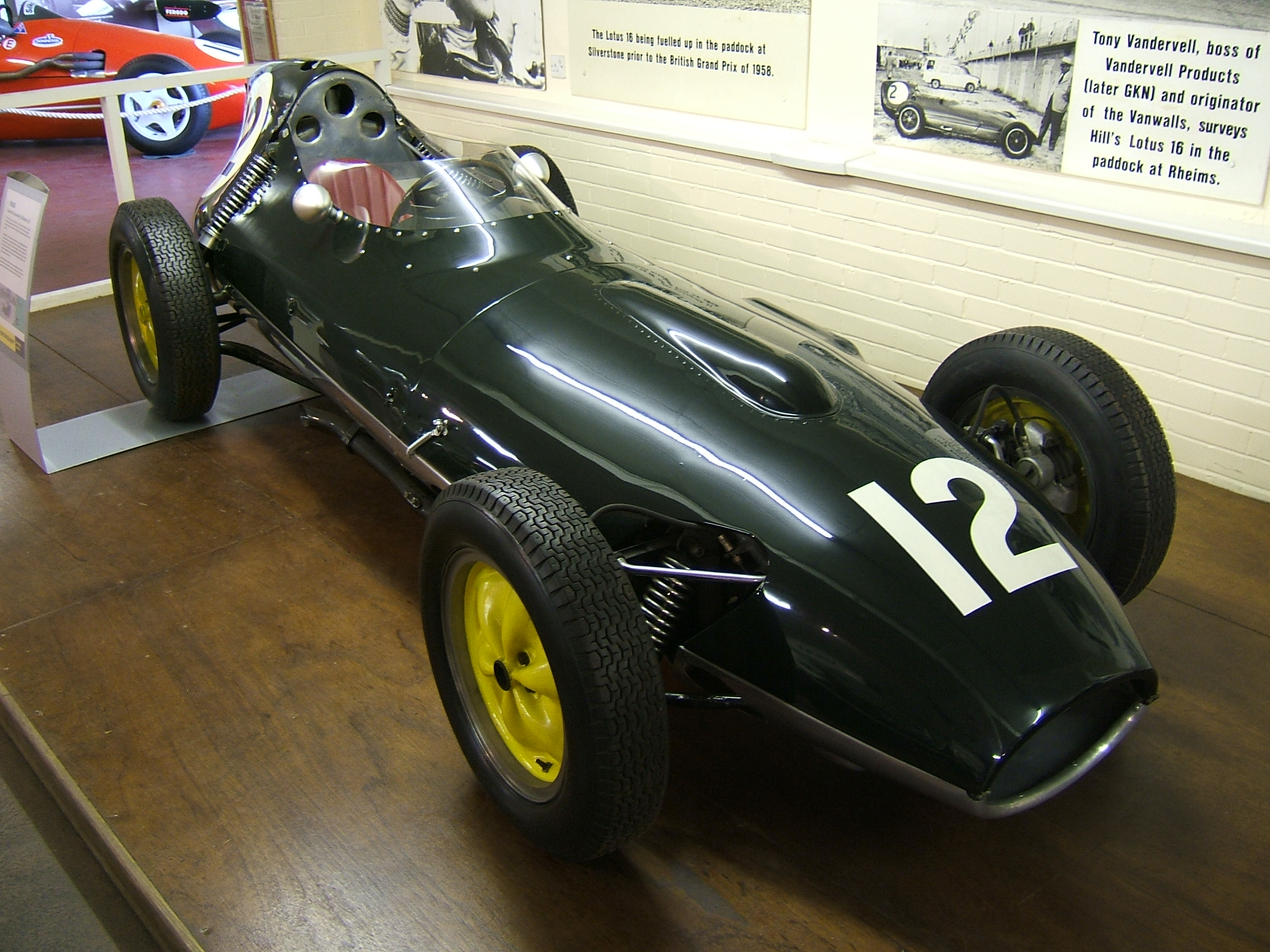
- Category: Formula One/Two
- Constructor: Lotus Cars
- Designer: Colin Chapman
- Predecessor: Lotus 12
- Successor: Lotus 18

Technical specifications
- Chassis: Steel spaceframe.
- Suspension (front): Double wishbone with outboard coilover spring/damper units.
- Suspension (rear): Chapman strut with integrated coilover spring/damper units.
- Axle track: 1,195 mm (47.0 in)
- Wheelbase: 2,235 mm (88.0 in)
- Engine: Coventry Climax FPF F2: 1,475 cc (90.0 cu in); F1: 1,964 cc (119.9 cu in), 2,207 cc (134.7 cu in), 2,467 cc (150.5 cu in) Gear-driven DOHC, straight-4. Naturally aspirated, front mounted.
- Transmission: Lotus (Ansdale-Mundy) 5-speed sequential manual transaxle with ZF differential.
- Weight: 490 kg (1,080 lb)
- Tyres: Dunlop

Competition history
- Notable entrants: Team Lotus
- Notable drivers: (United Kingdom) Graham Hill (United Kingdom) Innes Ireland
- Debut: 1958 French Grand Prix
Races	Wins	Podiums	Poles	F/Laps
17	0	0	0	0
- Constructors' Championships: 0
- Drivers' Championships: 0
- Unless otherwise stated, all data refer to Formula One World Championship Grands Prix only.

The Lotus 16 was the second single-seat racing car designed by Colin Chapman, and was built by his Lotus Cars manufacturing company for the Team Lotus racing squad. The Lotus 16 was constructed to compete in both the Formula One and Formula Two categories, and was the first Lotus car to be constructed for Formula One competition. Its design carried over many technological features of the first Lotus single-seater, the Lotus 12, as well as incorporating ideas which Chapman had been developing while working on the Vanwall racing cars. Indeed, such was the visual similarity between the Vanwall and Lotus 16 designs that the Lotus was often dubbed the "mini Vanwall" by the contemporary motor sport press. Although the Lotus 16 only scored five Formula One World Championship points in the three seasons during which it was used, its raw pace pointed the way for its more successful successors, the Lotus 18 and 21.

== Design ==
Colin Chapman had started building Ford-engined, Austin 7-based specials shortly after the end of World War II, and had quickly graduated to his own sports car designs with the Lotus 6 of 1952. These lithe, lightweight sports cars immediately took a stranglehold on domestic British club racing, and through a rapid succession of upgraded models soon moved up to the international stage, culminating in class wins in the 24 Hours of Le Mans race in both 1956 and 1957. Also in 1956 Chapman's reputation as an engineering innovator saw him drafted in by the ambitious Vanwall team to help develop their Formula One cars, and in 1957 the first single-seat Lotus, the Formula Two Lotus 12, appeared.

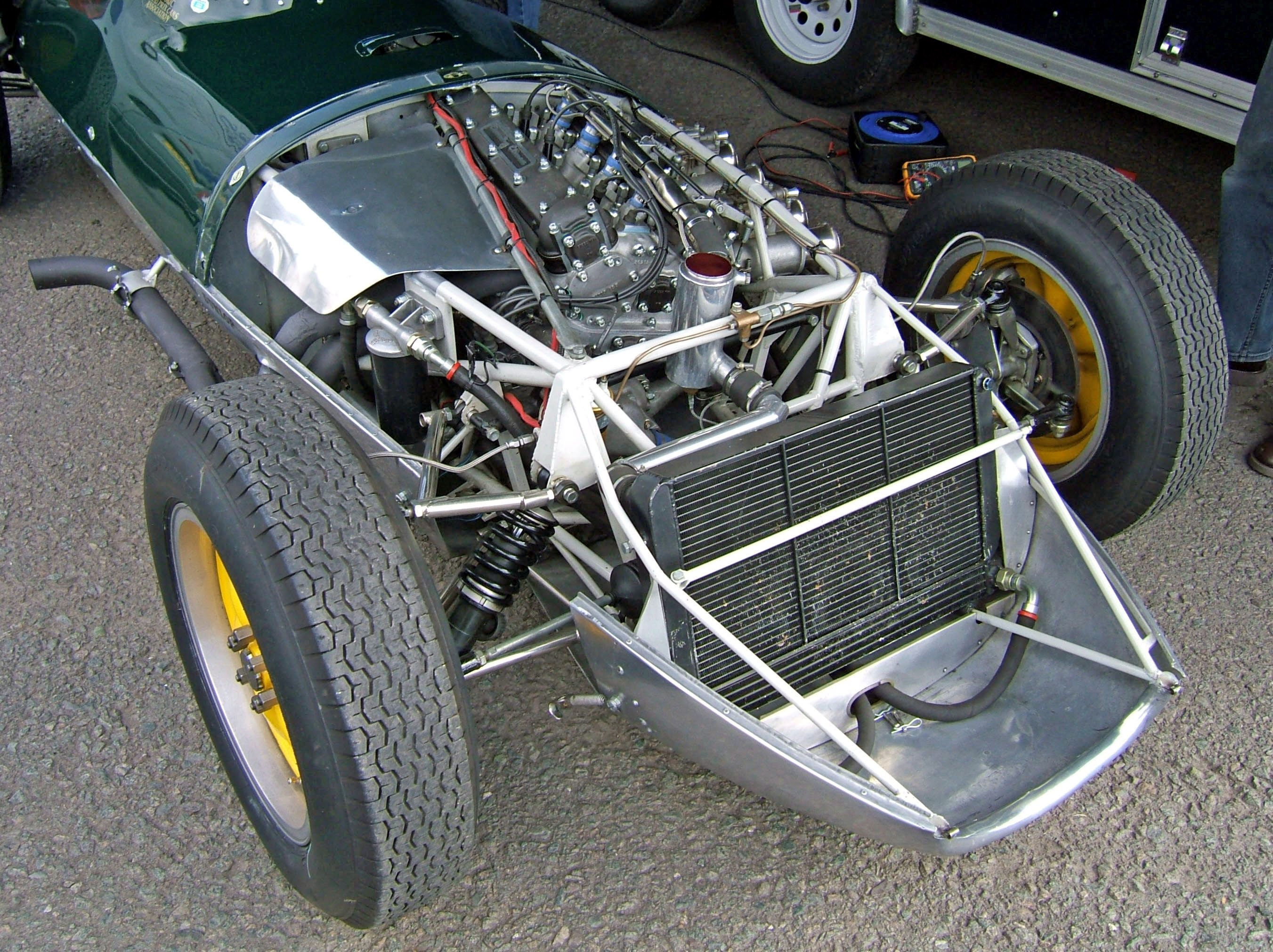
A Lotus 16 with its bonnet removed, clearly showing the spaceframe chassis and obliquely aligned engine. Also seen are details of the double wishbone front suspension.

His experiences with Vanwall showed Chapman that his own Lotus 12 design could itself provide the basis for a Formula One competitor. The 12's spaceframe chassis design was adapted to accept its engine in a distinctly offset position and allowed the drive shaft (driven at the engine speed) to pass to the left side of the driver, rather than beneath him, to reach the transaxle located in the rear, lowering the driving position and reducing the frontal area. The drive shaft used Hooke joints (not constant-velocity joints), which at the higher-than-usual shaft angles used produced a vibration at twice engine speed (two cycles per revolution). That high-frequency vibration caused chassis welds and transaxle mounts to fracture. The steel chassis tubes themselves were of a thinner gauge than the 12's, sacrificing strength in Chapman's quest for weight-saving. However, the handling of the car was badly compromised by the unequal weight distribution which resulted from the engine positioning, and the 16 had to be reworked to accept its engine in a more conventional, albeit obliquely aligned, central location.

The engine itself was Coventry Climax's FPF straight-4, in a variety of sizes. Initially the cars were fitted with the 2-litre powerplant, but as Climax gradually stretched the FPF's capacity the Lotus 16 appeared with a 2.2, then finally a 2.5-litre, full Formula One engine specification. As in the 12, the engine's power was transmitted to the road through the rear wheels, via Lotus's own 5-speed sequential manual transaxle. In its earliest incarnations this transaxle — designed by Richard Ansdale and Harry Mundy incorporating a ZF limited slip differential — proved troublesome and gained itself the derogatorily punning nickname "queerbox". However, in 1957 Chapman had hired Keith Duckworth (later to find fame as one half of the founders of Cosworth, and father of the Cosworth DFV) as a gearbox engineer who made significant improvements to its design. By the time that the Lotus unit found its way into the 16 it was a more reliable and less troublesome system.

The Lotus 16's front suspension was also borrowed from the 12, with Chapman's own double wishbone design incorporating the anti-roll bar within the upper wishbones; an example of Chapman's innovative attention to detail in trying to shave every excess ounce from his cars. Unlike the 12, however, the 16 was designed from the outset to incorporate the Chapman strut rear suspension design. This was one of the first rear independent suspension designs to be incorporated into a Formula One car, and offered much better traction, handling and adjustability than the previously common de Dion tube systems. The 16 also sported the, by now iconic, Lotus "wobbly-web wheels"; an innovative cast alloy design borrowed from the aviation industry. Brakes were disc brakes all round, mounted inboard at the rear.

That the bodywork enclosing all of Chapman's innovative technology was similar in appearance to the Vanwall Grand Prix cars was no accident, as both cars had been sculpted by pioneer automotive aerodynamacist Frank Costin. As with many of Lotus's competition cars, the aluminium used to construct the bodywork was extremely thin and offered little in the way of support for the underlying chassis members. The car was extremely low and compact, with the bonnet barely reaching the same height as the tops of the front wheels, despite the smaller diameters used from the 1959 season onward. The driver sat in a slightly reclined position — nowhere near as extremely inclined as Chapman would later inflict upon his pilots but still unusual for its day — and behind the driver rose a stubby rear fin, incorporating the fuel tank.

Eight Lotus 16s were built in total.

== Competition history ==
The Lotus 16 had been intended for use from the beginning of the 1958 Formula One season. However, delays owing to the need to reposition the engine within the chassis meant that the first Lotus Formula One car was in fact a converted Lotus 12, which made Lotus's Grand Prix debut at the 1958 Monaco Grand Prix. The Lotus 16 finally saw light of day three Grands Prix later, at the 1958 French Grand Prix on 6 July. A single car was entered for this event, to be driven by works driver and sometime mechanic Graham Hill. The 16 did not perform well, posting the second slowest time in qualifying, only beating team-mate Cliff Allison's 12. Although the 16 was very aerodynamically efficient, thanks to Costin's bodywork, the high speed Reims-Gueux circuit did not favour the 16's rather under-powered 2-litre engine; Hill's car overheated on lap 19.

Lotus 16s were entered for all of the remaining rounds of the 1958 World Championship season, sometimes in Formula Two configuration, but they often failed to finish the race. Commonly this was due to engine overheating or associated failures, but failures of other mechanical systems were far from uncommon. Although Hill and Allison did manage to nurse the 16 to the finish on a few occasions, most often they had completed too few laps to justify an official finishing classification.

For the 1959 Formula One season the works cars were finally upgraded to the full 2.5-litre specification, and mechanical upgrades had been made to improve reliability. In addition to the works team, Lotus 16s had also been sold to a number of privateer entrants. As the season progressed the works cars were gradually developed still further, and their qualifying times began to fall. Reliability was still a major issue, however, and too often the cars failed to complete a full race distance. Although regular works driver Hill failed to finish even a single race during the season, his team-mate Innes Ireland's car held together long enough to take five World Championship points, with fourth place in the Dutch Grand Prix and fifth in the season finale in the United States.

In the opening round of the 1960 Formula One season the works team fielded two 16s for Alan Stacey and local driver Alberto Rodríguez Larreta, while team-leader Ireland was equipped with the new Lotus 18. Following yet another retirement and a non-points finish Team Lotus abandoned the 16 entirely, in favour of the new model. However, with sponsorship from Robert Bodle Ltd., David Piper entered a lone 16 for the 1960 French and British Grands Prix, but again the car failed to trouble the Championship scorers.

=== World Championship results ===
(key)

Year	Entrant	Engine	Tyres	Drivers	1	2	3	4	5	6	7	8	9	10	11	Pts.	WCC
1958	Team Lotus	Coventry Climax FPF 2.2 L L4	D		ARG	MON	NED	500	BEL	FRA	GBR	GER	POR	ITA	MOR	3	6th^{1}
1958	Team Lotus	Coventry Climax FPF 2.2 L L4	D	Graham Hill						Ret	Ret		Ret	6	16	3	6th^{1}
1958	Team Lotus	Coventry Climax FPF 2.2 L L4	D	Alan Stacey							Ret					3	6th^{1}
1958	Team Lotus	Coventry Climax FPF 2.2 L L4	D	Cliff Allison								10				3	6th^{1}
1958	Team Lotus	Coventry Climax FPF 1.5 L L4	D	Graham Hill								Ret				3	6th^{1}
1959	Team Lotus	Coventry Climax FPF 2.5 L L4	D		MON	500	NED	FRA	GBR	GER	POR	ITA	USA			5	4th
1959	Team Lotus	Coventry Climax FPF 2.5 L L4	D	Graham Hill	Ret		7	Ret	9	Ret	Ret	Ret				5	4th
1959	Team Lotus	Coventry Climax FPF 2.5 L L4	D	Pete Lovely	DNQ											5	4th
1959	Team Lotus	Coventry Climax FPF 2.5 L L4	D	Innes Ireland			4	Ret		Ret	Ret	Ret	5			5	4th
1959	Team Lotus	Coventry Climax FPF 2.5 L L4	D	Alan Stacey					8				Ret			5	4th
1959	John Fisher	Coventry Climax FPF 1.5 L L4	D	Bruce Halford	Ret											5	4th
1959	Dorchester Service Station	Coventry Climax FPF 1.5 L L4	D	David Piper					Ret							5	4th
1960	Team Lotus	Coventry Climax FPF 2.5 L L4	D		ARG	MON	500	NED	BEL	FRA	GBR	POR	ITA	USA		34	2nd^{2}
1960	Team Lotus	Coventry Climax FPF 2.5 L L4	D	Alan Stacey	Ret											34	2nd^{2}
1960	Team Lotus	Coventry Climax FPF 2.5 L L4	D	Alberto Rodríguez Larreta	9											34	2nd^{2}
1960	Robert Bodle Ltd.	Coventry Climax FPF 2.5 L L4	D	David Piper						Ret	12					34	2nd^{2}

Footnotes

^{1} Three points scored using the Lotus 12.
^{2} Thirty four points scored using the Lotus 18.
