= Tony Brooks (racing driver) =

British racing driver (1932–2022)

- Brooks at the 1958 German Grand Prix
- Born: Charles Anthony Standish Brooks; 25 February 1932; Dukinfield, Cheshire, England
- Died: 3 May 2022 (aged 90); Ottershaw, Surrey, England
- Spouse: Pina Resegotti (m. 1958)
- Children: 5
- Relatives: Norman Brooks (cousin)

Formula One World Championship career
- Nationality: (United Kingdom) British
- Active years: 1956–1961
- Team(s): BRM, Vanwall, Ferrari, BRP
- Entries: 39 (38 starts)
- Championships: 0
- Wins: 6
- Podiums: 10
- Career points: 75
- Pole positions: 3
- Fastest laps: 3
- First entry: 1956 Monaco Grand Prix
- First win: 1957 British Grand Prix
- Last win: 1959 German Grand Prix
- Last entry: 1961 United States Grand Prix

Charles Anthony Standish "Tony" Brooks (25 February 1932 – 3 May 2022) was a British racing driver who competed in Formula One from 1956 to 1961. Nicknamed "the Racing Dentist", (Note: Brooks was nicknamed the Racing Dentist for his studies in dentistry, amongst his father's career as a dental surgeon.) Brooks was runner-up in the Formula One World Drivers' Championship in 1959 with Ferrari and Vanwall, and won six Grands Prix across six seasons.

Born and raised in Dukinfield, Brooks was the son of a dental surgeon. He began motor racing in 1952, driving sportscars at club events until he progressed to Formula Two in 1955. That year, Brooks debuted in Formula One machinery at the non-championship Syracuse Grand Prix with Connaught, becoming the first British victor in a British car in Grand Prix motor racing since 1923. He made his World Championship debut at the 1956 Monaco Grand Prix with BRM.

Joining Vanwall for 1957, Brooks took his maiden win at the British Grand Prix, sharing the victory with Stirling Moss. He finished third in the World Drivers' Championship in 1958, and runner-up to Jack Brabham the following season after his move to Ferrari, taking multiple victories across both seasons. Brooks joined BRP in 1960—driving a privateer Cooper T51—and departed without a podium finish. In 1961, he took his final podium at the United States Grand Prix with BRM, retiring at the conclusion of his campaign; he achieved six wins, three pole positions, three fastest laps, and 10 podiums in Formula One, in addition to his non-championship race win.

Outside of Formula One, Brooks was successful in sportscar racing, winning the 1957 1000km of Nürburgring and the 1958 RAC Tourist Trophy, driving the Aston Martin DBR1. He also entered four editions of the 24 Hours of Le Mans from 1955 to 1958 with Aston Martin.

== Career ==
Brooks was born on 25 February 1932, in Dukinfield, Cheshire, and educated at Mount St Mary's College. He was the son of a dental surgeon, Charles Standish Brooks, and studied the practice himself. He was also a cousin of Norman Standish Brooks, a former British Olympic swimmer. He took up racing in 1952 and drove a Healey and a Frazer Nash at club events until 1955. In that same year, Brooks drove in Formula Two a Connaught at Crystal Palace and finished fourth. Later in 1955, Brooks made his first Formula One start at the non-championship Syracuse Grand Prix, winning the race. This was the first international Grand Prix win for a British car since 1924 at the San Sebastián Grand Prix.

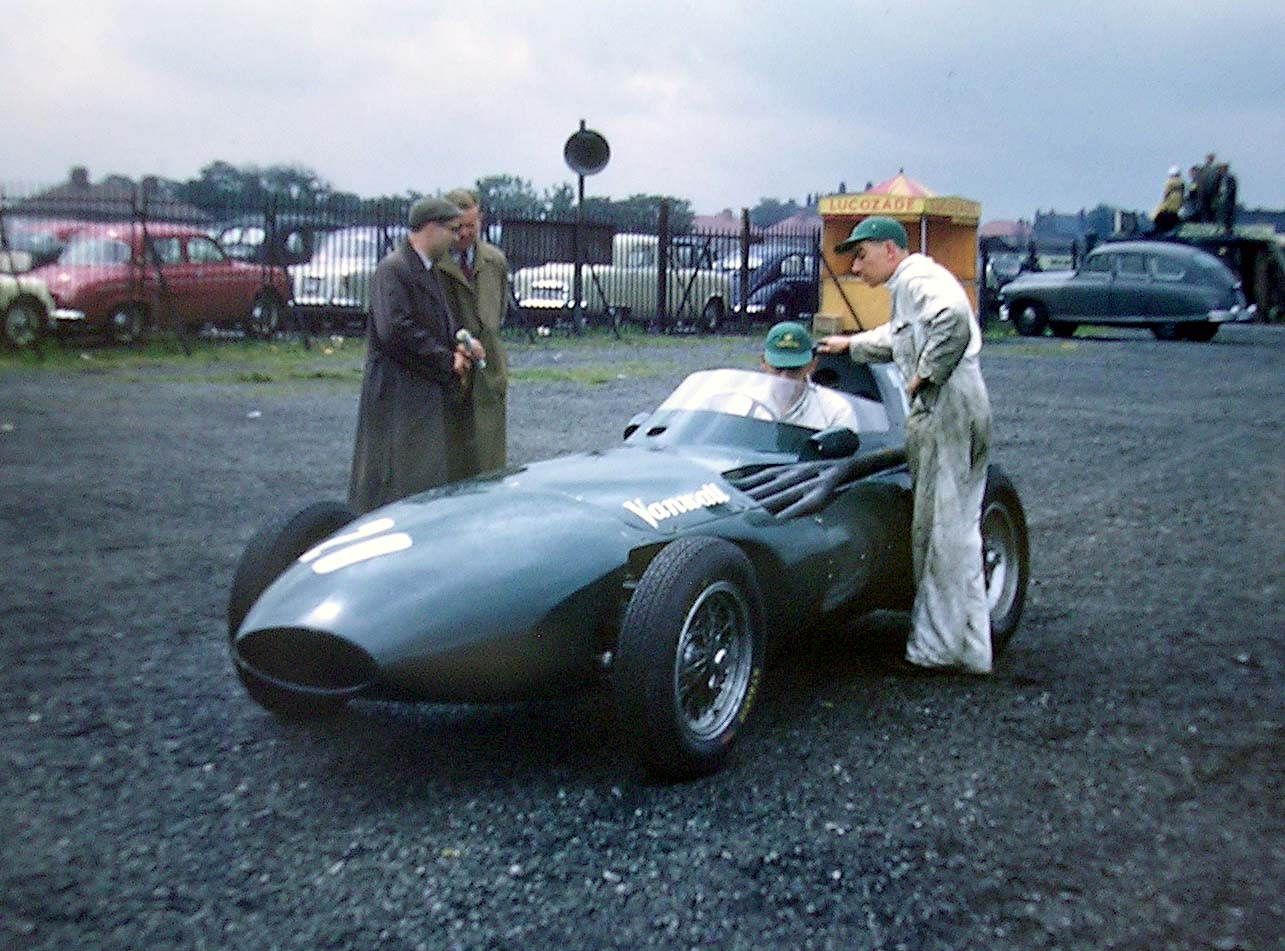
Brooks shared this Vanwall VW5 with Stirling Moss to win the 1957 British Grand Prix.

In 1957, Brooks claimed the first victory for a British-constructed car in a World Championship race in the British Grand Prix at Aintree, which he shared with Stirling Moss. Along with Moss, Brooks is considered one of the best drivers never to have been World Champion and both Moss and three-time World Champion Jack Brabham were known to have thought highly of his ability.

In 1959, Brooks, together with Brabham and Moss, had a chance to win the title due to the retirement and subsequent death in a road accident of Mike Hawthorn and the death in the previous season of Peter Collins. Brooks started well, with a second place at the Monaco Grand Prix, behind Brabham. He failed to finish at the Dutch Grand Prix but dominantly won the French Grand Prix at Reims. Having failed to finish in a Vanwall at the British Grand Prix, which he drove due to Ferrari workers in Italy being on strike, he won the only German Grand Prix of Formula One to be held at AVUS. The race was split unusually into two heats, and he won both. He had a slow car in Portugal, qualifying tenth and finishing five laps down. He retired shortly after the start at Monza but was still in contention to win the championship. At the first ever United States Grand Prix for Formula One at Sebring, he was hit by German teammate Wolfgang von Trips and pitted to check for any damage, losing two minutes. It proved to be a waste of time but still finished in third place. He finished second in the championship with 27 points, seven behind Brabham, and one-and-a-half ahead of Moss.

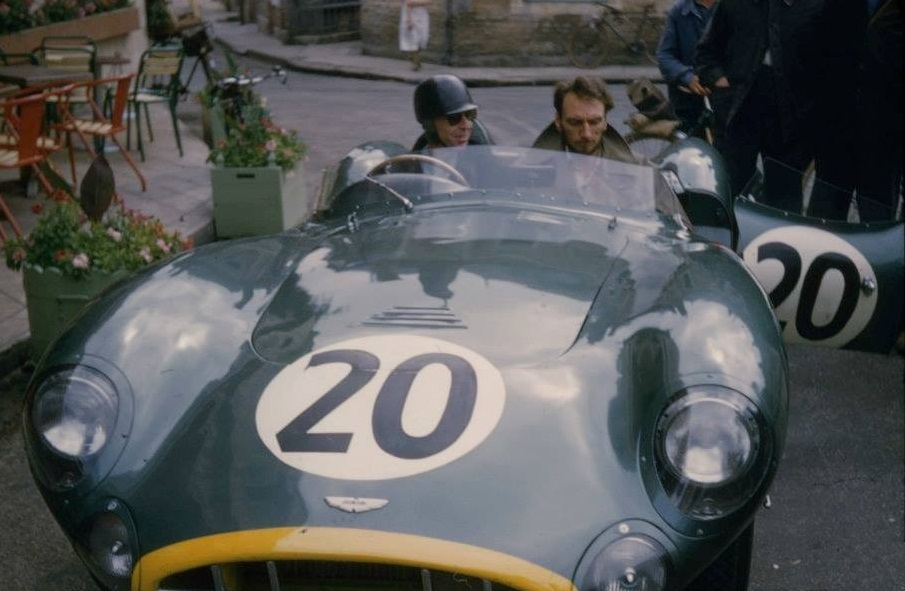
Brooks parked outside the 1957 Le Mans Aston Martin base, the Hotel de France, at the wheel of his DBR1 race car.

Brooks won six races for Vanwall and Ferrari, secured four pole positions, achieved ten podiums, and scored a total of 75 championship points. He drove for British Racing Motors but retired from the team at the end of 1961, just before their most successful season. He ended his career with a third place at the first ever United States Grand Prix at Watkins Glen. He was also an accomplished sports car driver, winning both the 1957 1000 km Nürburgring and the 1958 RAC Tourist Trophy, with co-driver, Moss, racing an Aston Martin DBR1. He was less successful at Le Mans in 1957 due again to an accident which occurred while racing an Aston Martin DBR1 at that year's 24-hour race, which brought about a change in his racing philosophy. A crash in the 1956 British Grand Prix and the subsequent Le Mans crash both occurred in cars with mechanical problems, of which he was aware, and Brooks, being a devout Catholic, vowed he would never again risk his life in a car that was in less than sound condition. He had fewer qualms when it came to his own condition, saying: "I was lucky in the Le Mans shunt in that I didn't break anything, but I did have very severe abrasions – there was a hole in the side of my thigh I could literally have put my fist into." It was with these injuries that he went on to race in the 1957 British GP with Moss, and win. In 2007, Brooks was honoured by his home town. The Dukinfield District Assembly, part of Tameside Council, held a dinner in his honour and unveiled a plaque outside his former home on Park Lane.

Brooks died aged 90 on 3 May 2022. As a result, in addition to Brooks becoming the last surviving Grand Prix winner from the 1950s after the death of Moss in April 2020, three-time World Champion Jackie Stewart (who first raced in the 1960s) was now the oldest Formula One Grand Prix winner.

== Racing record ==
=== Complete Formula One World Championship results ===
(key) (Races in bold indicate pole position; races in italics indicate fastest lap)

| Yr | Entrant | Chassis | Engine | 1 | 2 | 3 | 4 | 5 | 6 | 7 | 8 | 9 | 10 | 11 | WDC | Points |
|---|---|---|---|---|---|---|---|---|---|---|---|---|---|---|---|---|
| 1956 | Owen Racing Organisation | BRM P25 | BRM Straight-4 | ARG | MON; DNS | 500 | BEL | FRA | GBR; Ret | GER | ITA | | | | NC | 0 |
| 1957 | Vandervell Products | Vanwall | Vanwall Straight-4 | ARG | MON; 2 | 500 | FRA | GBR; 1* | GER; 9 | PES; Ret | ITA; 7** | | | | 5th | 11 |
| 1958 | Vandervell Products | Vanwall | Vanwall Straight-4 | ARG | **MON**; Ret | NED; Ret | 500 | BEL; 1 | FRA; Ret | GBR; 7 | GER; 1 | POR; Ret | ITA; 1 | MOR; Ret | **3rd** | **24** |
| 1959 | Scuderia Ferrari | Ferrari Dino 246 | Ferrari V6 | MON; 2 | 500 | NED; Ret | **FRA**; 1 | | **GER**; 1** | POR; 9 | ITA; Ret | USA; 3 | | | **2nd** | **27** |
| 1959 | Vandervell Products | Vanwall | Vanwall Straight-4 | | | | | GBR; Ret | | | | | | | **2nd** | **27** |
| 1960 | Yeoman Credit Racing Team | Cooper T51 | Climax Straight-4 | ARG | MON; 4 | 500 | NED; Ret | BEL; Ret | | GBR; 5 | POR; 5 | ITA | USA; Ret | | 11th | 7 |
| 1960 | Vandervell Products | Vanwall | Vanwall Straight-4 | | | | | | FRA; Ret | | | | | | 11th | 7 |
| 1961 | Owen Racing Organisation | BRM P48/57 | Climax Straight-4 | MON; 13 | NED; 9 | BEL; 13 | FRA; Ret | GBR; 9 | GER; Ret | ITA; 5 | USA; 3 | | | | 10th | 6 |

* Brooks won the 1957 British Grand Prix sharing his car with Stirling Moss. Both were awarded half points for their victory (4 instead of 8).
** Brooks was also awarded one point in the 1957 Italian Grand Prix and 1959 German Grand Prix for recording the fastest lap.

=== Non-championship results ===
(key) (Races in bold indicate pole position) (Races in italics indicate fastest lap)

| Year | Entrant | Chassis | Engine | 1 | 2 | 3 | 4 | 5 | 6 | 7 | 8 | 9 | 10 | 11 | 12 | 13 | 14 | 15 | 16 | 17 | 18 | 19 | 20 | 21 |
|---|---|---|---|---|---|---|---|---|---|---|---|---|---|---|---|---|---|---|---|---|---|---|---|---|
| 1955 | Equipe Endeavour | Connaught Type A | Lea-Francis Straight-4 | BUE | VLN | PAU | GLV | BOR | INT | NAP | ALB | CUR | CRN | LON; 4 | REC | RDX | TLG; 4 | OUL | AVO; 5 | | | | | |
| 1955 | Connaught Engineering | Connaught Type B | Alta Straight-4 | | | | | | | | | | | | | | | | | SYR; 1 | | | | |
| 1956 | Owen Racing Organisation | BRM P25 | BRM Straight-4 | NZL | BUE | GLO; Ret | SYR | BAR; 2 | INT | NAP | AIN; Ret | VAN | CAE | SUS | BRS | AUS | | | | | | | | |
| 1957 | Vandervell Products Ltd. | Vanwall | Vanwall Straight-4 | BUE | SYR; Ret | PAU | GLV; 6 | NAP | RMS | | | | **MOR**; Ret | | | | | | | | | | | |
| 1957 | Tony Brooks | Cooper T43 | Climax Straight-4 | | | | | | | CAE; Ret | INT; Ret | MOD | | | | | | | | | | | | |
| 1958 | Tony Brooks | Cooper T45 | Climax Straight-4 | BUE | GLV | SYR | AIN; 3 | INT; Ret | CAE | | | | | | | | | | | | | | | |
| 1959 | Scuderia Ferrari | Ferrari 246 | Ferrari V6 | GLV | AIN; 2 | INT; Ret | OUL | SIL | | | | | | | | | | | | | | | | |
| 1960 | G.A. Vandervell | Vanwall | Vanwall Straight-4 | GLV; 7 | INT; DNA | | | | | | | | | | | | | | | | | | | |
| 1960 | Yeoman Credit Racing Team | Cooper T51 | Climax Straight-4 | | | SIL; Ret | | | | | | | | | | | | | | | | | | |
| 1960 | Vandervell Products Ltd. | Lotus 18 | Vanwall Straight-4 | | | | LOM; DNS | OUL | | | | | | | | | | | | | | | | |
| 1961 | Owen Racing Organisation | BRM P48/57 | BRM Straight-4 | LOM | GLV; Ret | PAU | BRX | VIE | AIN; 7 | SYR; Ret | NAP | LON | SIL; 3 | SOL | KAN | DAN | MOD; 6 | FLG | OUL; 4 | LEW | VAL | RAN | NAT | RSA |
