= 1958 Monaco Grand Prix =

Coordinates: 43°44′4.74″N 7°25′16.8″E

← Previous race	Next race →

Race details
- Date: 18 May 1958
- Official name: XVI Grand Prix Automobile
- Location: Circuit de Monaco
- Course: Street Circuit
- Course length: 3.145 km (1.954 miles)
- Distance: 100 laps, 314.5 km (195.4 miles)

Pole position
Driver	(United Kingdom) Tony Brooks	Vanwall
- Time: 1:39.8

Fastest lap
Driver	(United Kingdom) Mike Hawthorn	Ferrari
- Time: 1:40.6

Podium
First	(France) Maurice Trintignant	Cooper-Climax
Second	(Italy) Luigi Musso	Ferrari
Third	(United Kingdom) Peter Collins	Ferrari

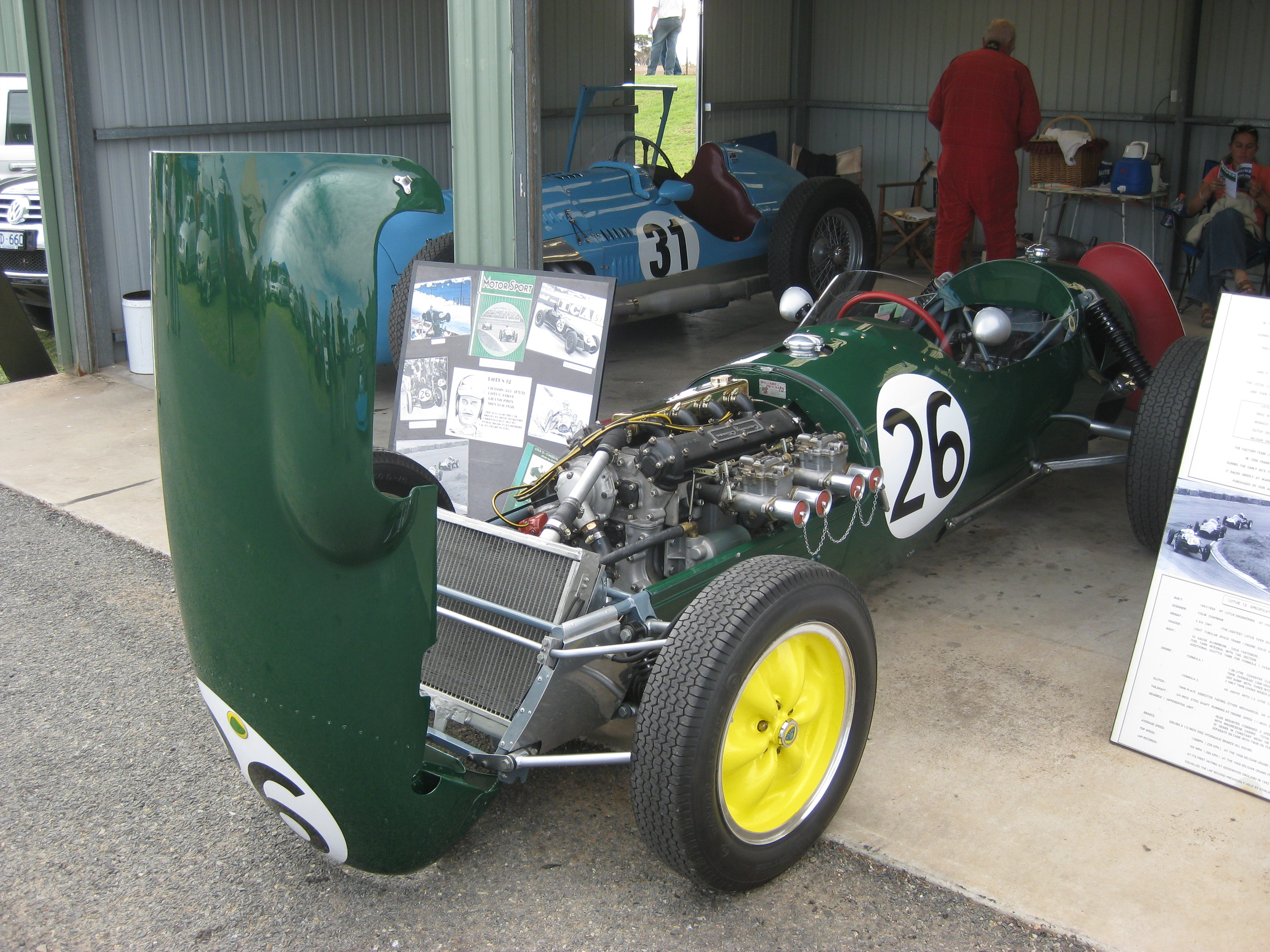
Lotus 12, chassis no 353, (pictured above in 2010) was driven by Graham Hill in his Grand Prix debut at Monaco in 1958

The 1958 Monaco Grand Prix was a Formula One motor race held on 18 May 1958 at Monaco. It was race 2 of 11 in the 1958 World Championship of Drivers and race 2 of 10 in the 1958 International Cup for Formula One Manufacturers. The race was the 16th Monaco Grand Prix and was held over 100 laps of the three kilometre circuit for a total race distance of 314 kilometres.

The race was won by French driver Maurice Trintignant in the second and final Grand Prix victory of his long career. The win was the second consecutive victory for the privateer Rob Walker Racing Team and its Rear mid-engine, rear-wheel-drive layout Cooper-Climax cars which in January had won the 1958 Argentine Grand Prix that was only contested by 10 cars. The team gambled on not needing a pit stop for new tyres, which the competitors did not realise in time to chase down the underpowered Cooper with its worn tyres, thus Stirling Moss won on a shoe string. He also won the 1958 BARC Aintree 200 in which Coopers dominated.

In Monaco, the disadvantage of the still undersized 2000 cc Climax FPF engine compared to fullsize 2500cc F1 engines could be matched by lower weight and better handling. Three of the new Cooper T45 qualified among the top 5, and it was Trintignant who took the teams newly acquired Cooper T45 to a twenty-second victory over Italian driver Luigi Musso driving a Ferrari 246 F1 while Musso's British teammate Peter Collins (Ferrari 246 F1) was third.

Already in the 1936 Monaco Grand Prix, the mid-engine Auto Union racing cars had scored podium finishes and fastest lap, yet it took 20 more years until this layout showed up again in Grand Prix racing. Trintignant's win put the superiority of front-engined cars in doubt, but with the engine still under size, only two more podium finishes followed later in the year. Musso's second second place put him into a four-point championship lead over race winners Moss and Trintignant who failed to score additional points.

== Race report ==
Vanwall and BRM returned after their Argentine absence and so Stirling Moss, Jean Behra and Harry Schell all went back to their regular drives. In Moss's place at the Rob Walker Racing Team with the new 2000 cc engined Cooper T45 was French driver Maurice Trintignant. The race winning Cooper T43 could not even qualify for the small 16-car Monaco grid, Ron Flockhart was first reserve for the race.

Missing from the field was the previous year's winner and reigning World Champion, Juan Manuel Fangio who did not have a full-season drive, but in January had set pole and fastest lap in his home GP, driving a private Maserati, before he won the Formula Libre 1958 Buenos Aires Grand Prix and subsequently was kidnapped in Cuba. Fangio remained in America, preparing for an ultimately disappointing Indianapolis 500 campaign with two cars.

Future Formula One impresario Bernie Ecclestone entered two Connaught B-Types to be driven by Bruce Kessler and Paul Emery. Neither could qualify complaining of handling problems so Bernie Ecclestone tested one of the cars to see if he could help identify the cause, but he couldn't. This has given rise to the widely circulated story that he attempted unsuccessfully to qualify. Also failing to make the grid were Maria Teresa de Filippis, the first female driver to enter a World Championship Grand Prix, and 58-year-old Louis Chiron in his final appearance at a Grand Prix. The Monaco local had won the Grand Prix 27 years earlier but Chiron and his Maserati 250F did not make it past qualifying.

Tony Brooks took pole position in his Vanwall VW 5 but Behra won the start. He led until his brakes failed in his BRM P25, and Mike Hawthorn swept by in the Ferrari 246 F1. Moss (Vanwall VW 5) had been duelling with him throughout the race until he retired on lap 38, and Hawthorn followed suit on lap 47 with a broken fuel pump. Graham Hill, a future winner, briefly led the race and retired his Lotus 12-Climax from fourth place in his first race on lap 69. Vanwall pair Brooks and Stuart Lewis-Evans retired, too, leaving Trintignant to lead home the Ferraris by some 20 seconds giving Rob Walker his second race win of the year. Behind the Ferraris of Luigi Musso and Peter Collins was Jack Brabham in the factory Cooper T45, although three laps down and still looking a long way from becoming the next years champion. Schell in his BRM P25 was a further six laps behind Brabham picking up the final points after Wolfgang von Trips had an engine failure in the closing stages in his Ferrari 246 F1. The only other car still circulating was the second Lotus 12 of Cliff Allison, 13 laps behind Trintignant.

Trintignant's win disproved the belief that rear-engined Cooper victory achieved by Stirling Moss in Argentina was only a one-off freak circumstance win, and the smaller British cars would be treated more seriously, although ultimately a Cooper would not win another WC race until 1959. Another British newcomer, Vanwall, with a full size engine mounted in the front, would dominate the remainder of the season, with BRM and Lotus being future winners, too. The Rob Walker Racing Teams pair of early 1958 victories would remain the best ever performance by a privateer team until the rise of Tyrrell Racing in the late 1960s.

== Classification ==
=== Qualifying ===
Pos	No	Driver	Constructor	Time	Gap
1	30	(United Kingdom) Tony Brooks	Vanwall	1:39.8	
2	6	(France) Jean Behra	BRM	1:40.8	+1.0
3	16	(Australia) Jack Brabham	Cooper–Climax	1:41.0	+1.2
4	18	(United Kingdom) Roy Salvadori	Cooper–Climax	1:41.0	+1.2
5	20	(France) Maurice Trintignant	Cooper–Climax	1:41.1	+1.3
6	38	(United Kingdom) Mike Hawthorn	Ferrari	1:41.5	+1.7
7	32	(United Kingdom) Stuart Lewis-Evans	Vanwall	1:41.8	+2.0
8	28	(United Kingdom) Stirling Moss	Vanwall	1:42.3	+2.5
9	36	(United Kingdom) Peter Collins	Ferrari	1:42.4	+2.6
10	34	(Italy) Luigi Musso	Ferrari	1:42.6	+2.8
11	8	(United States) Harry Schell	BRM	1:43.8	+4.0
12	40	(West Germany) Wolfgang von Trips	Ferrari	1:44.3	+4.5
13	24	(United Kingdom) Cliff Allison	Lotus–Climax	1:44.6	+4.8
14	46	(Italy) Giorgio Scarlatti	Maserati	1:44.7	+4.9
15	26	(United Kingdom) Graham Hill	Lotus–Climax	1:45.0	+5.2
16	58	(Sweden) Jo Bonnier	Maserati	1:45.0	+5.2
17	22	(United Kingdom) Ron Flockhart	Cooper–Climax	1:45.9	+6.1
18	50	(Australia) Ken Kavanagh	Maserati	1:49.0	+9.2
19	48	(Italy) Gerino Gerini	Maserati	1:49.8	+10.0
20	12	(United States) Bruce Kessler	Connaught–Alta	1:50.5	+10.7
21	14	(United Kingdom) Paul Emery	Connaught–Alta	1:50.8	+11.0
22	44	(Italy) Maria Teresa de Filippis	Maserati	1:50.8	+11.0
23	56	(Monaco) André Testut	Maserati	1:51.4	+11.6
24	52	(Italy) Giulio Cabianca	O.S.C.A.	1:52.0	+12.2
25	54	(Italy) Luigi Piotti	O.S.C.A.	1:52.4	+12.6
26	42	(United Kingdom) Horace Gould	Maserati	1:54.0	+14.2
DNQ	12	(United Kingdom) Bernie Ecclestone	Connaught–Alta	2:43.3	+1:03.5
DNQ	50	(Italy) Luigi Taramazzo	Maserati	No time	
DNQ	56	(Monaco) Louis Chiron	Maserati	No time	
DNQ	4	(Spain) Paco Godia	Maserati	No time	

=== Race ===
Pos	No	Driver	Constructor	Laps	Time/Retired	Grid	Points
1	20	(France) Maurice Trintignant	Cooper-Climax	100	2:52:27.9	5	8
2	34	(Italy) Luigi Musso	Ferrari	100	+20.2 secs	10	6
3	36	(United Kingdom) Peter Collins	Ferrari	100	+38.8 secs	9	4
4	16	(Australia) Jack Brabham	Cooper-Climax	97	+3 Laps	3	3
5	8	(United States) Harry Schell	BRM	91	+9 Laps	12	2
6	24	(United Kingdom) Cliff Allison	Lotus-Climax	87	+13 Laps	13	
Ret	40	(West Germany) Wolfgang von Trips	Ferrari	91	Engine	11	
Ret	58	(Sweden) Jo Bonnier	Maserati	71	Accident	16	
Ret	26	(United Kingdom) Graham Hill	Lotus-Climax	69	Halfshaft	15	
Ret	18	(United Kingdom) Roy Salvadori	Cooper-Climax	56	Gearbox	4	
Ret	38	(United Kingdom) Mike Hawthorn	Ferrari	47	Fuel pump	6	1^{1}
Ret	28	(United Kingdom) Stirling Moss	Vanwall	38	Engine	8	
Ret	6	(France) Jean Behra	BRM	29	Brakes	2	
Ret	46	(Italy) Giorgio Scarlatti	Maserati	28	Engine	14	
Ret	30	(United Kingdom) Tony Brooks	Vanwall	22	Engine	1	
Ret	32	(United Kingdom) Stuart Lewis-Evans	Vanwall	11	Overheating	7	
DNQ	22	(United Kingdom) Ron Flockhart	Cooper-Climax				
DNQ	50	(Australia) Ken Kavanagh	Maserati				
DNQ	48	(Italy) Gerino Gerini	Maserati				
DNQ	12	(United States) Bruce Kessler	Connaught-Alta				
DNQ	14	(United Kingdom) Paul Emery	Connaught-Alta				
DNQ	44	(Italy) Maria Teresa de Filippis	Maserati				
DNQ	56	(Monaco) André Testut	Maserati				
DNQ	52	(Italy) Giulio Cabianca	Osca				
DNQ	54	(Italy) Luigi Piotti	Osca				
DNQ	42	(United Kingdom) Horace Gould	Maserati				
DNQ	10	(United Kingdom) Ron Flockhart	BRM				
DNQ	12	(United Kingdom) Bernie Ecclestone	Connaught-Alta				
DNQ	50	(Italy) Luigi Taramazzo	Maserati				
DNQ	56	(Monaco) Louis Chiron	Maserati				
DNQ	4	(Spain) Paco Godia	Maserati				

Notes

- ^1 – 1 point for fastest lap

== Additional information ==
This was the debut World Championship race for Cliff Allison, future double world champion and five time Monaco winner Graham Hill, Ken Kavanagh, Bruce Kessler, Maria Teresa de Filippis, André Testut, Giulio Cabianca, Bernie Ecclestone, and Luigi Taramazzo. It also marked the debut race for Team Lotus in Formula One.

Luigi Musso scored his final podium and points this race, while Maurice Trintignant claimed his final victory.

== Championship standings after the race ==
Drivers' Championship standings

	Pos	Driver	Points
1	1	(Italy) Luigi Musso	12
1	2	(United Kingdom) Stirling Moss	8
8	3	(France) Maurice Trintignant	8
1	4	(United Kingdom) Mike Hawthorn	5
5	5	(United Kingdom) Peter Collins	4

Constructors' Championship standings

Pos	Constructor	Points
1	(United Kingdom) Cooper-Climax	16
2	(Italy) Ferrari	12
3	(Italy) Maserati	3
4	(United Kingdom) BRM	2

- Note: Only the top five positions are included for both sets of standings.

Previous race: 1958 Argentine Grand Prix	FIA Formula One World Championship; 1958 season	Next race: 1958 Dutch Grand Prix
Previous race: 1957 Monaco Grand Prix	Monaco Grand Prix	Next race: 1959 Monaco Grand Prix
