= Queerbox =

Motor vehicle transmission

The 'Queerbox' was the nickname for an early sequential manual transaxle used by Lotus racing cars of the late-1950s and early-1960s, and was very similar in design and operation to a motorcycle gearbox. It was infamously unreliable.

== Lotus Twelve origins ==
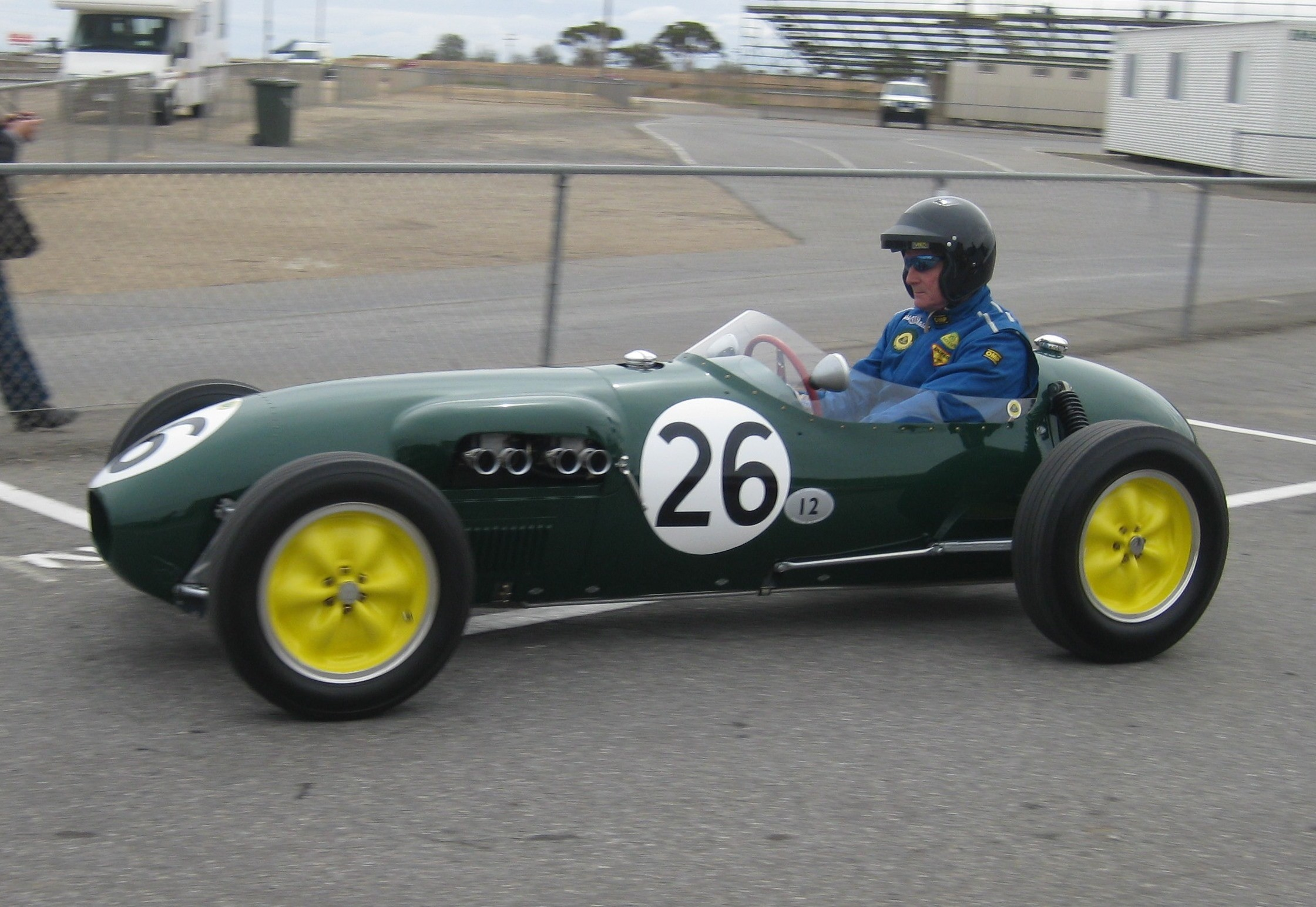
Chassis 353, Graham Hill's 1958 Monaco Grand Prix car

The Lotus Twelve was the first to use the infamous Lotus Queerbox transaxle. This was developed to be, in typical Colin Chapman fashion, the smallest and lightest five-speed transmission possible, also to have a low driveshaft line allowing a low driving position, thus lower centre of mass and air resistance. Chapman also chose a transaxle over the usual gearbox and rear axle layout, as had been used in the first Twelve, as this gave a lower polar moment of inertia. The initial design, the work of Chapman and Harry Mundy, began with the principle of the most compact layout, with the gear cluster arranged in a closely spaced stack, akin to a motorcycle transmission. As the gears shared common axes, and all teeth were cut to the same size, all the pairs of gear had the same number of teeth in total, 44. The stack was only 3 5/8 in (92 mm) long overall. This was likely to require sequential gear change, (Note: A sequential manual transmission is one where gears can only be selected in order, without skipping gears. Most road cars use an "H-pattern" shift, where any gear can be chosen in any order. A "paddle-shift system", with two buttons for 'change up' and 'change down,' is a form of "sequential" transmission, but not all sequential transmissions have a button-controlled shift, rather than a lever.) but that was no drawback in a racing car. The gears would also be easily changeable, to suit different circuits. Gears could be used with the same ratio in any position, to suit both hillclimbing or fast circuits, provided that they remained in a monotonic sequence.

=== Design ===
The shifting mechanism was chosen with the additional input of Richard Ansdale. Space requirements, and the length of the gear cluster, meant that the selection mechanism would have to be mounted inside the gear cluster, rather than the usual motorcycle arrangement of dog clutches between the gears, an external drum to control their engagement and forks to connect the two. The mechanism needed to lock the selected gear onto the shaft, never engage more than one at a time, and all had to work at racing speeds.

Such gearboxes had been built before, but neither widely used nor successfully. Porsche had used one for his 1907 Maja, with a series of internal pawls inside the shaft which could be pushed out one-by-one to engage the gears. Goggomobil and Claude Hill of Ferguson, had both used an internal 'bung' sliding inside the shaft to push out a locking cam or balls through the hollow shaft and engage the gears. Archie Butterworth's AJB Special had used a sleeve over a solid shaft, the sleeve sliding lengthways to engage the gears and also to act as the other gear's bearing surface. The Butterworth design was the one chosen. The designs were so similar that Chapman initially negotiated with Butterworth for the rights to use it, but without any final agreement.

The tubular "selector sleeve" slid back and forth over the input shaft and was splined to rotate with it. The gears of the input shaft were not attached to it and could rotate freely. They rode on the outside of the selector sleeve, not on the shaft itself. The output shaft of the gearbox had all five gears splined to it and in constant mesh with the other gears. (Note: First gear was slightly different.) On the outside of the selector sleeve was a ring of dogs, which could engage one gear at a time as the sleeve was slid back and forth through the gear cluster. The faces of these dogs were not flush but were slightly offset so that they engaged one by one.

=== Unreliability ===
Initial servicing of the Queerbox was undertaken by Graham Hill, then a mechanic at Lotus. (Note: Hill would make his Formula One debut at Monaco in May 1958, driving a Lotus Twelve.) It was soon discovered that the final drive was reliably unreliable, with all examples having the hypoid crown wheel pinion of their final drives fail at around fifty miles, much less than a single race. When improved oils meant that they lasted barely long enough to compete, it was then found that the gearbox section was also unreliable, with a worn box becoming unable to select a gear and leaving drivers with "a box full of neutrals".

The task of fixing the Queerbox's unreliability problems, fell to Keith Duckworth, a young Lotus engineer. He then fell out with Chapman, who would not support the cost of the fix that Duckworth felt was needed, leading to Duckworth leaving to set-up Cosworth with Mike Costin.

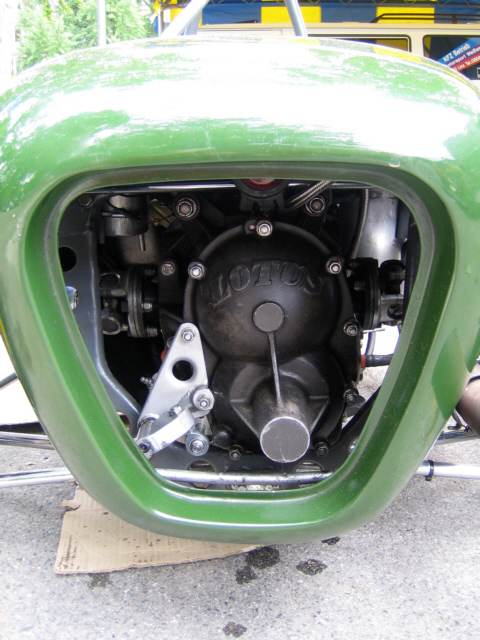
Lotus 18

== Bibliography ==
- Ludvigsen, Karl (2006). Classic Grand Prix Cars (2nd ed.). Haynes Publishing. ISBN 1-84425-318-X.
- Ludvigsen, Karl (2010). Colin Chapman: Inside the Innovator. Haynes Publishing. ISBN 978-1-84425-413-2.
- Robson, Graham (2017). Cosworth - The Search For Power (6th ed.). Veloce Publishing. pp. 23–26. ISBN 978-1845848958.
