= Sequential manual transmission =

Motor transmission

Sequential manual transmission shifting animation

A sequential manual transmission, also known as a sequential gearbox or sequential transmission, is a type of non-synchronous manual transmission used mostly in motorcycles and racing cars. It produces faster shift times than traditional synchronized manual transmissions, and restricts the driver to selecting either the next or previous gear, in a successive order.

== Design ==
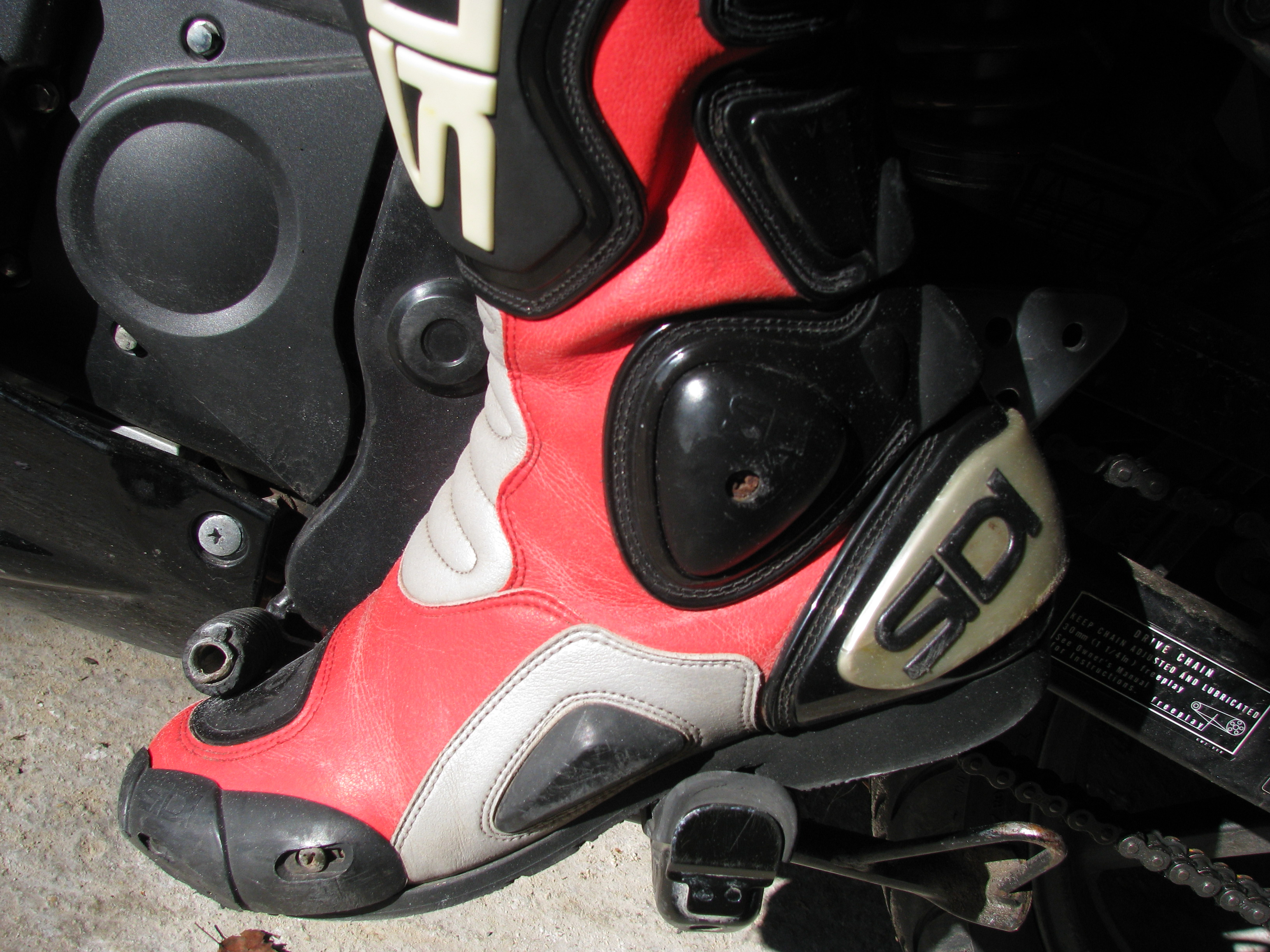
Gear shift lever on a motorcycle (above the toe of the rider's boot)

A sequential manual transmission is unsynchronized, and allows the driver to select either the next gear (e.g. shifting from first gear to second gear) or the previous gear (e.g., shifting from third gear to second gear), operated either via electronic paddle-shifters mounted behind the steering wheel or with a sequential shifter. This restriction avoids accidentally selecting the wrong gear; however, it also prevents the driver from deliberately "skipping" gears. The use of dog clutches (rather than synchromesh) results in faster shift speeds than a conventional manual transmission.

On a sequential manual transmission, the shift lever operates a ratchet mechanism that converts the fore-and-aft motion of the shift lever into rotation of a gear shift drum or selector drum (sometimes called a barrel) which has three or four tracks machined around its circumference. Selector forks are guided by the tracks, either directly or via selector rods. The tracks deviate around the circumference and as the drum rotates, the selector forks are moved to select the required gear.

When upshifting or downshifting a sequential manual transmission, there is no need to operate the clutch, which is only required when the vehicle starts. Since the engagement ring (or "dog ring") is pushed by the shift fork and moves quick, and the engagement ring begins to transmit power synchronously while it comes into contact, the sequential manual transmission has the shortest shift speed, and the shift time is usually 5 milliseconds or less, and is therefore now used in all Formula 1 cars.

A sequential manual transmission is not to be confused with the manumatic sequential shifting function sometimes fitted to hydraulic automatic transmission, marketed with terms such as "Tiptronic" or "SportShift". This function allows the driver to select the previous or next gear through the use of buttons or a lever (usually near the gear shifter or steering wheel); however, the mechanics of the transmission are unrelated to a true sequential manual transmission.

== Usage ==
Most motorcycles use a sequential manual transmission. The rider controls the gear shifter with their foot, allowing their hands to remain on the handlebars, and gear selection uses a layout of 1 - N - 2 - 3 - 4 - 5 - 6 (for a typical 6-speed gearbox, said as "one down, five up"). However, most modern motor scooters do not use a sequential manual transmission; instead using either a hydraulic automatic transmission, or a belt-driven or chain-driven continuously variable transmission. Underbones, however, often use a semi-automatic transmission with an automatic centrifugal clutch, but will still retain the conventional foot-operated gearshift lever, such as the Honda Super Cub.

== History ==
The first proper sequential manual gearbox used in a racecar was with the Porsche Type 360 Cisitalia in 1946, followed by the infamously unreliable Queerbox design, pioneered by Richard Ansdale and Harry Mundy, which was used in various Lotus Grand Prix racecars during the late-1950s and early-1960s, beginning with the 1958 Lotus 12, and is technically the first proper "sequential" gearbox used in a racecar. Most racing cars also use a sequential transmission now (via a sequential shift lever, with a mechanical linkage, or electronic paddle-shifters), rather than the old H-pattern stick shift, beginning with the paddle-shifted Ferrari 640 Formula One car in 1990, which used a sequential drum-rotation mechanism.

The first modern sequential manual gearbox with a manual shift lever was used in the 1990 Peugeot 905 Group C sports car, followed by the Ferrari 333 SP LMP racecar and CART Champ Cars/Indycars in 1994 and 1996, and then the McLaren F1 GTR, Mercedes-Benz CLK GTR, Porsche 911 GT1, and Panoz Esperante GTR-1 GT1 racecars in 1996 and 1997. This was closely followed by WRC Rally cars in 1997, 1998, and 1999, and also the Porsche LMP1-98, Nissan R390 GT1, Toyota GT-One, and the BMW V12 LM' and LMR Le Mans Prototype racecars in 1998 and 1999.

Touring cars have also used sequential manual gearboxes; starting with the European DTM series in 2000, which used it for 12 seasons, until a switch to a paddle-shift system in 2012. The Australian V8 Supercars series started using sequential manual gearboxes in 2008, after switching from an H-pattern manual gearbox.

NASCAR introduced a 5-speed sequential manual transmission with their Gen-7 car in 2022, after using a conventional 4-speed H-pattern manual transmission for many years.

Due to the high rate of wear and abrupt shifting action, sequential manual transmissions are rarely used in passenger cars, albeit with some exceptions.

== See also ==
- Dog clutch
- Dual-clutch transmission
- Manual transmission
