= Lotus 12 =

British racing car

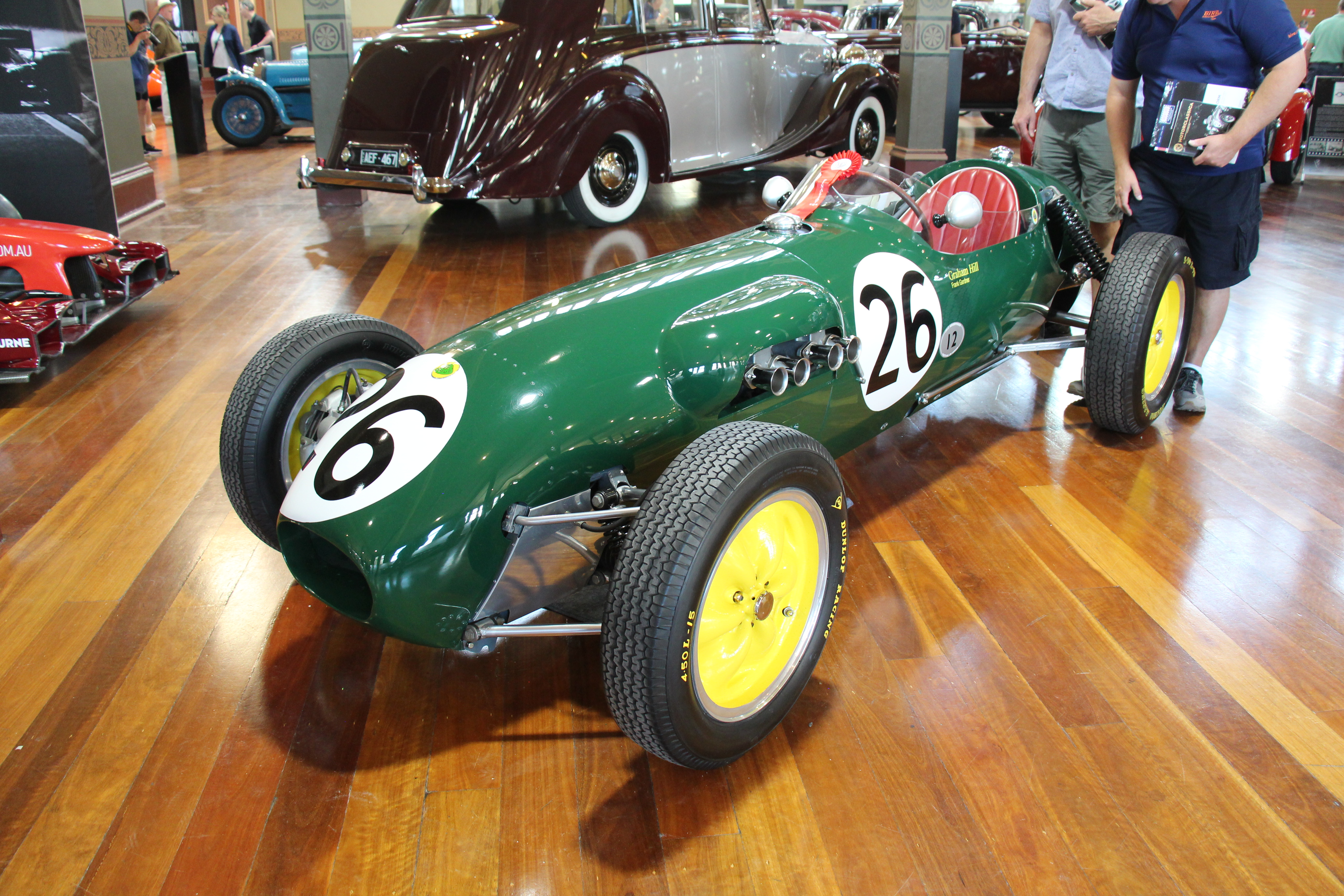
- Category: Formula One, Formula Two
- Constructor: Team Lotus
- Designer: Colin Chapman
- Successor: Lotus 16

Technical specifications
- Chassis: Aluminium body on multi-tubular space frame
- Suspension (front): Double wishbone, coils springs, dampers, anti-roll bar
- Suspension (rear): Chapman strut, trailing arms, fixed length drive shaft
- Length: 130.9 in (332.5 cm)
- Width: 60 in (152.4 cm)
- Height: 35 in (88.9 cm)
- Axle track: 48 in (121.9 cm)
- Wheelbase: 87.9 in (223.3 cm)
- Engine: Coventry Climax FPF 1,965 cc (119.9 cu in) Inline 4-cylinder, DOHC Naturally-aspirated Front engined, longitudinally-mounted
- Transmission: Ansdale-Mundy transaxle 5-speed manual ZF diff. with bespoke casing
- Power: 175 bhp (130.5 kW)
- Weight: 320 kg (705.5 lb)
- Fuel: Petrol
- Brakes: Disc, all-round
- Tyres: Dunlop

Competition history
- Notable entrants: Team Lotus
- Notable drivers: (United Kingdom) Graham Hill (United Kingdom) Cliff Allison
- Debut: 1958 Monaco Grand Prix
- Last event: 1959 British Grand Prix
Races	Wins	Podiums	Poles	F/Laps
9	0	0	0	0
- Unless otherwise stated, all data refer to Formula One World Championship Grands Prix only.

The Lotus 12 was a British racing car used in Formula Two and Formula One. It debuted at the 1958 Monaco Grand Prix and was Colin Chapman's first single-seat racer.

== Design ==
Colin Chapman's first foray into single-seater racing, the 12 appeared in 1958. It featured a number of important innovations Chapman would use on later models. To better use the power of the Coventry Climax engine, it was designed, as usual, for low weight and low drag, relying on a space frame. It placed the driver as low as possible, reducing the height of transmission tunnel by way of a "conceptually brilliant" five-speed sequential-shift transaxle located in the back. This transaxle was designed by Richard Ansdale and Harry Mundy. The gearbox had a (long-undiagnosed) oil starvation problem, thus earned the nickname "Queerbox" for its unreliability.

Although the first two examples of Lotus 12 had De Dion rear suspension, it also introduced a new suspension configuration with what came to be called "Chapman struts" in the rear, essentially a MacPherson strut with a fixed length halfshaft with universal joints on the ends utilised as a suspension arm.

Lotus-Climax 12

Lotus 12 was the first Lotus to be fitted with the iconic wobbly-web wheels. Reflecting Chapman's emphasis on engineering for lightness, these were cast in magnesium alloy, a kind of crimped cylinder, resulting in minimum material and maximum strength, without the weaknesses induced by slots in conventional designs.

Despite its engineering advances, the 12 was not a success in F1. In F2, the car won the class in the mixed F1/F2 1958 BRDC International Trophy, driven by Cliff Allison, but in spite of a small number of podiums, was usually drowned in a sea of Coopers.

== Gallery ==
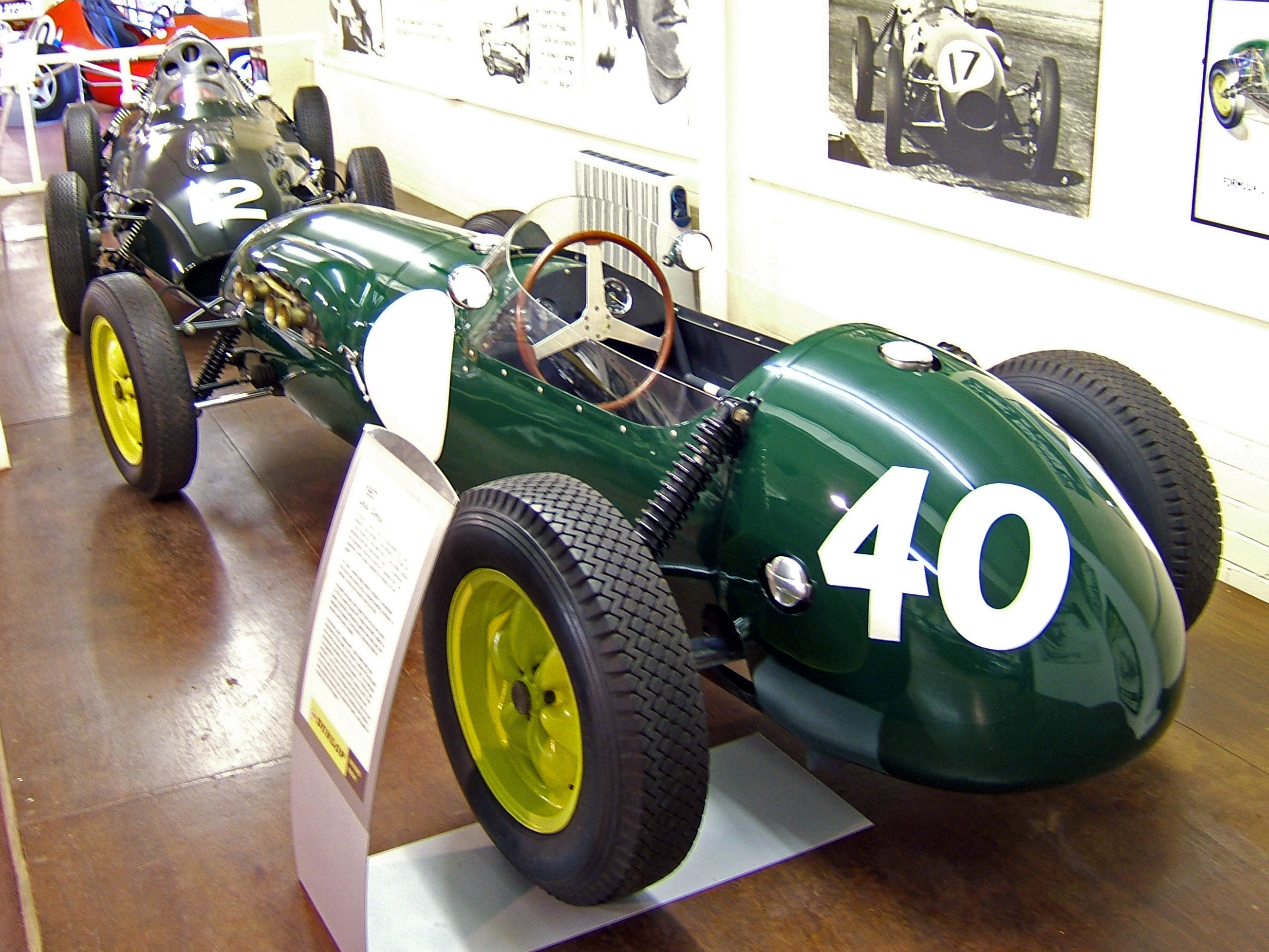
Lotus 12 in the Donington Grand Prix Exhibition in 2007

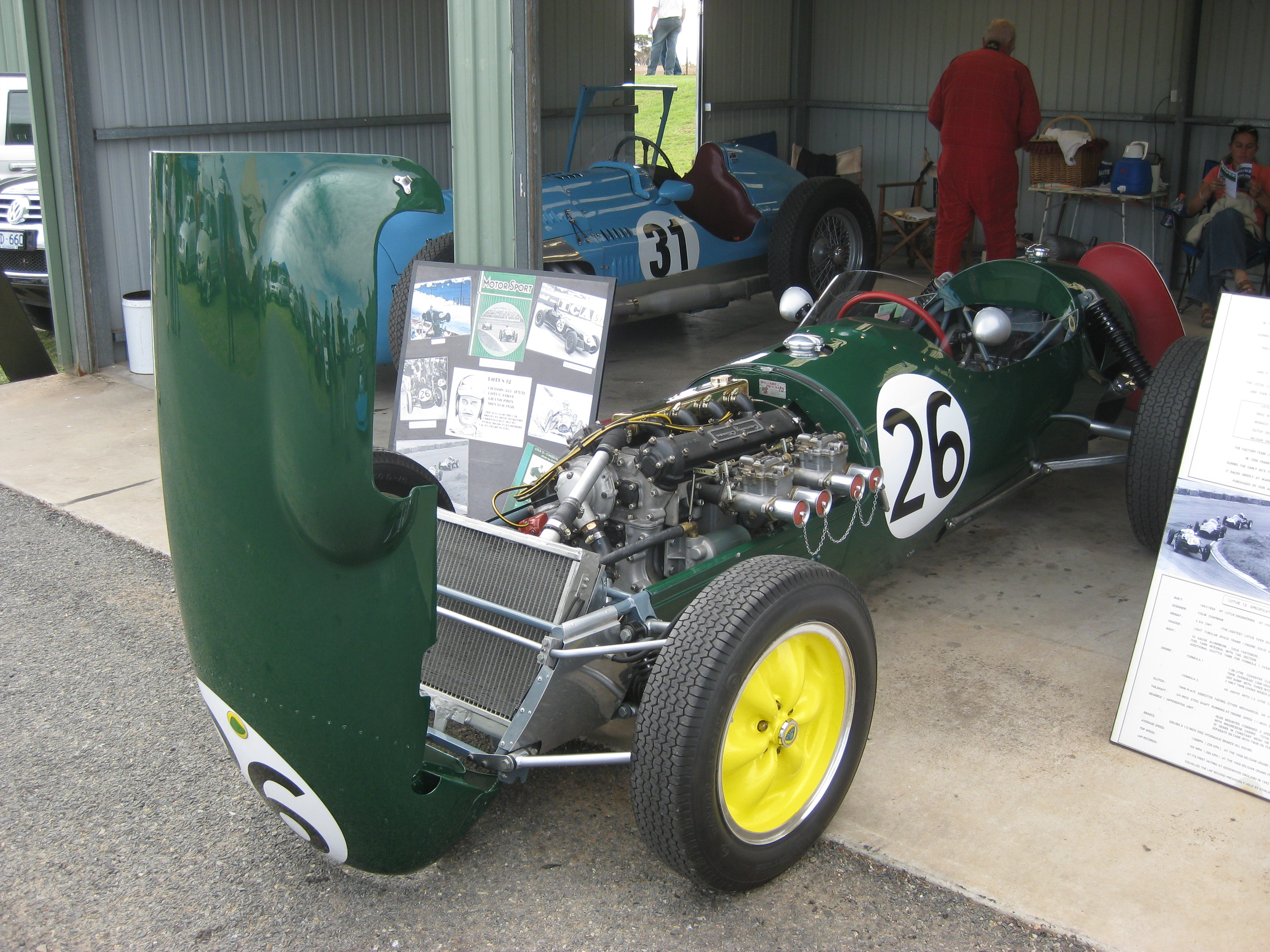
Lotus 12, Chassis No. 353 in 2010

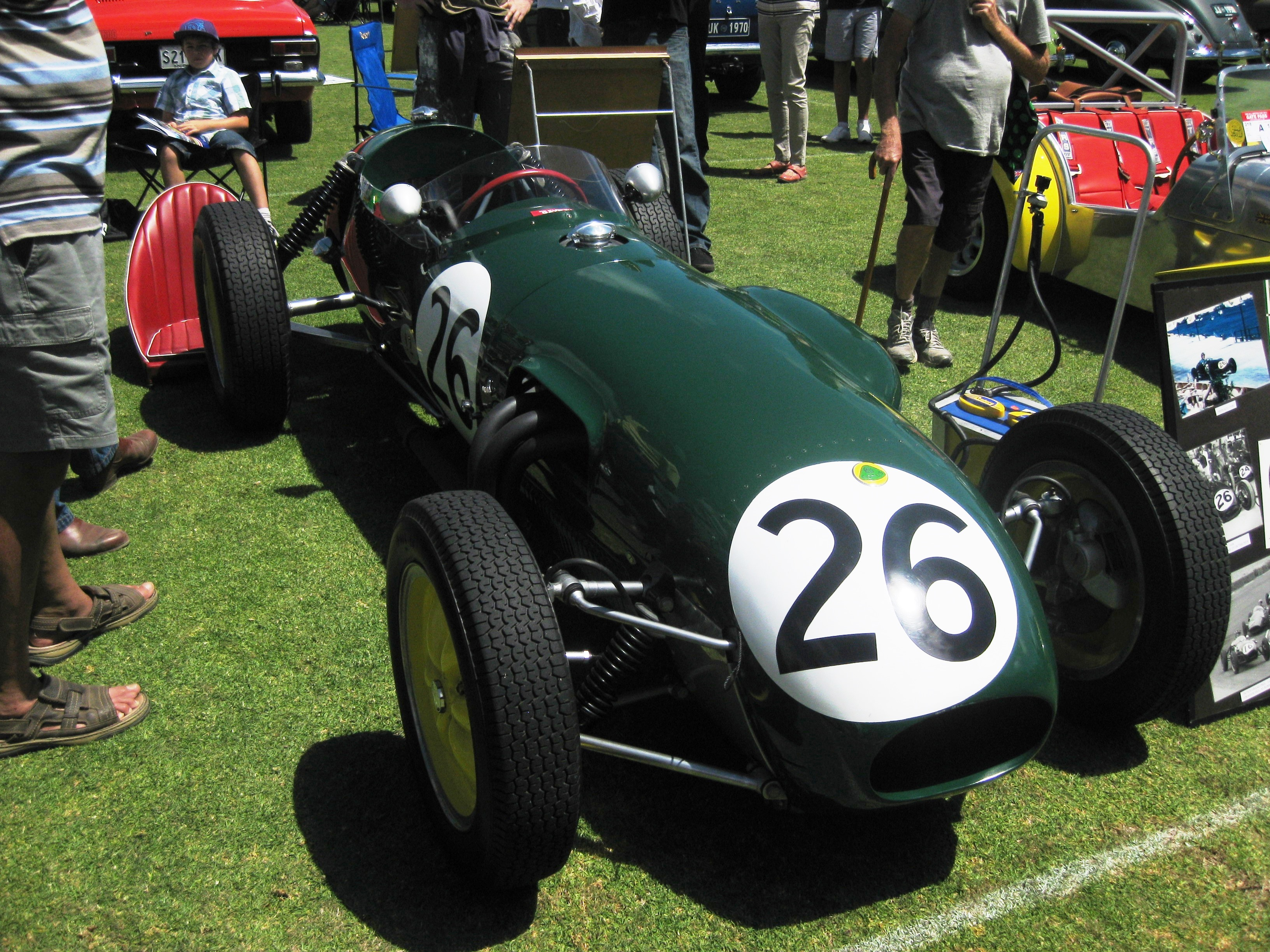
Lotus 12, Chassis No. 353 in 2013

== Complete Formula One World Championship results ==
(key) (Results in bold indicate pole position; results in italics indicate fastest lap.)

Year	Teams	Engine	Tyres	Drivers	1	2	3	4	5	6	7	8	9	10	11	Points	WCC
1958	Team Lotus	Climax Straight-4	D		ARG	MON	NED	500	BEL	FRA	GBR	GER	POR	ITA	MOR	3	6th
1958	Team Lotus	Climax Straight-4	D	Cliff Allison		6	6		4	Ret	10			7	10	3	6th
1958	Team Lotus	Climax Straight-4	D	Graham Hill		Ret	Ret		Ret							3	6th
1958	Ecurie Demi Litre	Climax Straight-4	D	Ivor Bueb								11*				3	6th
1959	Dennis Taylor	Climax Straight-4	D		MON	500	NED	FRA	GBR	GER	POR	ITA	USA			5	4th^{1}
1959	Dennis Taylor	Climax Straight-4	D	Dennis Taylor					DNQ							5	4th^{1}

^1 All points scored using the Lotus 16. * F2 driver

== Sources ==
- Setright, L. J. K. Lotus: The golden mean, in Northey, Tom (ed.) World of Automobiles (London: Orbis, 1974), Volume 11, pp. 1221–34.
