= 1958 Buenos Aires Grand Prix =

The Buenos Aires Circuit No:4

The 1958 Buenos Aires Grand Prix was a Formula Libre race held at Buenos Aires on 2 February 1958, at the Autódromo Oscar Alfredo Gálvez.

== Classification ==
Pos	Driver	Constructor	Laps	Time/Retired
1	(Argentina) Juan Manuel Fangio	Maserati 250F	60	2:38:47.3
2	(Italy) Luigi Musso	Ferrari 246	60	2:39:56.7
3	(Argentina) Carlos Menditeguy	Maserati 250F	59	
4	(Italy) Giorgio Scarlatti (France) Jean Behra	Maserati 250F	57	
5	(Sweden) Jo Bonnier	Maserati 250F	57	
6	(Argentina) José Froilán González	Ferrari-Chevrolet	57	
7	(Argentina) Ramón Requejo	Chevrolet Special	56	
8	(Uruguay) Marcos Galván	Ford Special	55	
9	(Uruguay) Danton Bazet	Chevrolet Special	54	
10	(Uruguay) Asdrúbal Fontes Bayardo	Maserati-Chevrolet	51	
11	(United Kingdom) Horace Gould	Maserati 250F	40	
Ret	(United Kingdom) Peter Collins	Ferrari 246		DNF
Ret	(United Kingdom) Mike Hawthorn	Ferrari 246		DNF
Ret	(Germany) Wolfgang von Trips	Ferrari 246		DNF
Ret	(Argentina) Roberto Bonomi	Maserati 250F		DNF
Ret	(Australia) Ken Kavanagh	Maserati 250F		DNF
Ret	(United Kingdom) Stirling Moss	Cooper T43 Climax		DNF
Ret	(Argentina) Jesús Iglesias	Chevrolet Special		DNF
Ret	(Argentina) Roberto Miéres	Maserati 250F		DNF
