= Cliff Allison =

British racing driver (1932–2005)

- Born: 8 February 1932; Brough, Westmorland, England
- Died: 7 April 2005 (aged 73); Brough, Cumbria, England

Formula One World Championship career
- Nationality: (United Kingdom) British
- Active years: 1958–1961
- Team(s): Lotus, Scuderia Centro Sud, Ferrari, UDT Laystall
- Entries: 18 (16 starts)
- Championships: 0
- Wins: 0
- Podiums: 1
- Career points: 11
- Pole positions: 0 (Note: Allison set the fastest practice time for the 1959 German Grand Prix but was not awarded pole position because he was only a reserve entrant in the 4th Ferrari)
- Fastest laps: 0
- First entry: 1958 Monaco Grand Prix
- Last entry: 1961 Belgian Grand Prix

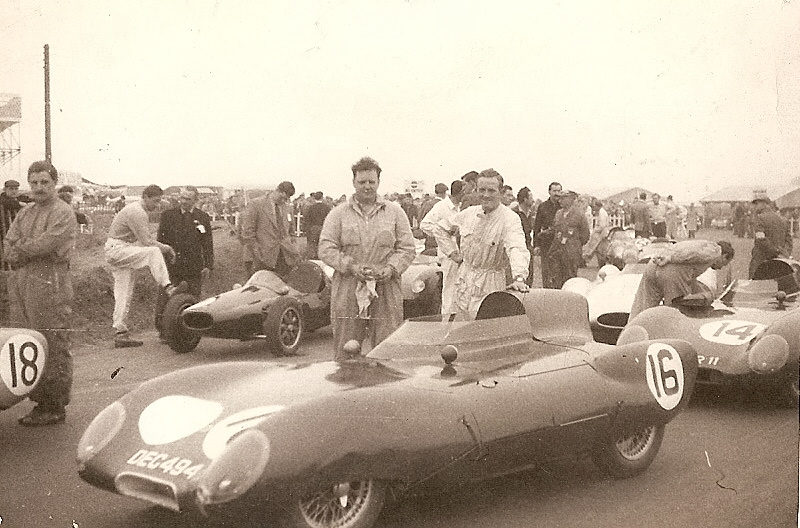
Silverstone Grand Prix, "Formula Two" Race, July 1956. Cliff Allison, driver of Lotus Eleven car no.16 leaning on car. He finished fourth. Graham Hill, driver of Lotus Eleven no.18 standing on left. Senior mechanic John Crosthwaite holding cloth

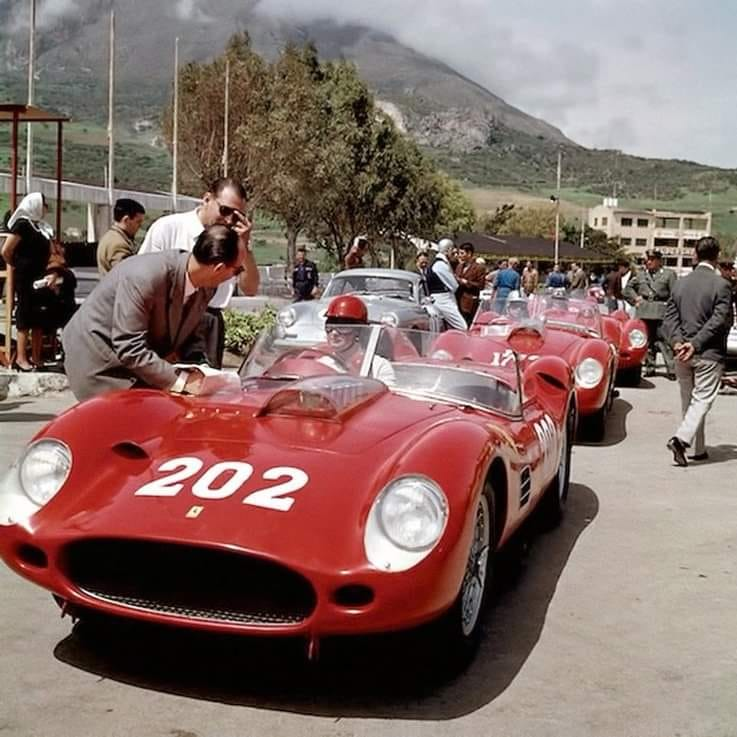
Allison at the 1960 Targa Florio in No. 202 Ferrari 250 TR59 after crashing in the No. 196 250 TRI

Henry Clifford Allison (8 February 1932 – 7 April 2005) was a British racing driver from England, who participated in Formula One during seasons 1958 to 1961 for the Lotus, Scuderia Centro Sud, Ferrari and UDT Laystall teams. He was born and died in Brough, Westmorland (now Cumbria).

== Formula Three and Sports Cars ==
Allison started his racing career in a Formula Three Cooper 500 in 1953 before being spotted by Colin Chapman. He won the Index of Performance prize driving a 744cc Lotus in the 1957 24 Hours of Le Mans. The Lotus of Allison and Colin Chapman finished sixth in the 1958 12 Hours of Sebring endurance race for sports cars. Allison came in fourth with his Lotus in the 1958 Grand Prix of Europe at Spa-Francorchamps, more than four minutes behind victor Tony Brooks.

Allison and Dan Gurney shared one of three team Ferrari cars that competed in the June 1959 1000 km Nürburgring race. Seventy-five cars entered the 1000 kilometre race which was a world championship event for sports cars.

Allison was paired with Jean Behra in a Ferrari which finished second in the 1959 12 Hours of Sebring. The drivers received $1,500 in prize money. Allison was credited with the fastest lap of the Sebring race in the No. 9 Ferrari. He was clocked at 3 minutes 21.6 seconds on the 97th lap of the 5.2-mile course.

During practice before the 8 May 1960 Targa Florio near Palermo, Sicily, Allison skidded off the road. His No. 196 Ferrari 250 TRI had reached a speed of 100 miles per hour when a tyre burst, or so the driver believed. The car crashed into a scrub forest, destroying itself and most of what it touched. When the mishap occurred the Ferrari was nearing the end of the four-mile Buonfornello straight by the sea, the only very fast stretch of road in the event. Allison escaped from the wreck without a scratch, but his face was ashen and his mouth hung open with an expression of fear. He raced the No. 202 car anyway.

== Formula One Lotus (1958, 1961), Ferrari (1959–60) ==
Allison was forced to make numerous pit stops during the 1958 Monaco Grand Prix. His Lotus finished sixth, 12 laps behind race winner Maurice Trintignant.

Ferrari's stable of drivers for 1959 were Olivier Gendebien, Phil Hill, Tony Brooks, Jean Behra, Dan Gurney, and Allison.

For the 1959 Monaco Grand Prix, the Ferrari factory team fielded truncated versions of the cars they ran in future grand prix races. At Monte Carlo the Ferraris' long sleek snouts (air scoops) were cut away to allow more air into the cooling systems. Wolfgang von Trips lost control of his Porsche F2 in a bend where the street was steeply inclined to Casino. Allison's Formula 2 Ferrari crashed into him as he spun. The Lotus of Bruce Halford came next into the blind curve and became part of the wreck. Allison and his Ferrari suffered the least damage while von Trips sustained a gashed face, and Halford had a cut to his arm. None of the three cars could continue.

Jean Behra was fired from Ferrari before the 1959 German Grand Prix at Berlin's AVUS, and got killed there in a Porsche sportscar on the dangerous banking. Due to the new track, there were three days of practice, and the race was split into two heats. Allison was in a reserve entry Ferrari and set the fastest practice lap on Friday, at 2:05.8, 0.1 quicker than Tony Brooks at 2:05.9 who, as a regular entrant, started from pole. When the entries of Behra and another underpowered Formula 2 Porsche were withdrawn, Allison and Ian Burgess were allowed to start, but from the end of the field. Allison's car suffered clutch failure after only 2 laps while Burgess finished 6th. This marks the only time in Formula One history that the fastest qualifier was unable to start on pole, simply because of the car's entry.

In the 1960 Argentine Grand Prix, Allison scored the best result of his Formula 1 career when he finished 2nd. He suffered a major crash behind the wheel of his Ferrari while practising for the 29 May 1960 Monaco Grand Prix, and it took him almost the rest of the year to recover from his injuries. Allison was hurt when his Ferrari slammed into a straw barrier. He was unconscious when he was taken to a hospital. Allison sustained a broken left arm, rib fractures, facial cuts, and a concussion. He was listed in serious condition.

The following year, Allison suffered another crash at the wheel of his Lotus in practice for the 1961 Belgian Grand Prix. He broke both his knees and fractured his pelvis when his car careened off the course and overturned in a field.

== Post-Formula One career ==
This marked the end of his career in motor sport. He kept in touch with the sport through reunions and was always a popular visitor to the paddock.

Allison owned and managed Allison's Garage in Brough. The business had been started by his father and he returned to it after his racing career ended. Allison's also provided the village and school bus services, which Cliff Allison would drive.

== Racing record ==
=== Complete Formula One World Championship results ===
(key)

Year	Entrant	Chassis	Engine	1	2	3	4	5	6	7	8	9	10	11	WDC	Points
1958	Team Lotus	Lotus 12	Climax L4	ARG	MON; 6	NED; 6	500	BEL; 4	FRA; Ret	GBR; Ret			ITA; 7	MOR; 10	18th	3
1958	Team Lotus	Lotus 16	Climax L4								GER; 10				18th	3
1958	Scuderia Centro Sud	Maserati 250F	Maserati L6									POR; Ret			18th	3
1959	Scuderia Ferrari	Ferrari Dino 156	Ferrari V6	MON; Ret											17th	2
1959	Scuderia Ferrari	Ferrari Dino 246	Ferrari V6		500	NED; 9	FRA	GBR	GER; Ret	POR	ITA; 5	USA; Ret			17th	2
1960	Scuderia Ferrari	Ferrari Dino 246	Ferrari V6	ARG; 2	MON; DNQ	500	NED	BEL	FRA	GBR	POR	ITA	USA		12th	6
1961	UDT-Laystall Racing Team	Lotus 18	Climax L4	MON; 8	NED	BEL; DNS	FRA	GBR	GER	ITA	USA				NC	0

=== Complete 24 Hours of Le Mans results ===
Year	Team	Co-Driver	Car	Class	Laps	Pos.	Class Pos.
1956	(United Kingdom) Lotus Engineering	(United Kingdom) Keith Hall	Lotus 11	S 1.1	89	DNF	DNF
1957	(United Kingdom) Lotus Engineering	(United Kingdom) Keith Hall	Lotus 11	S 750	259	14th	1st
1958	(United Kingdom) Lotus Engineering	(United Kingdom) Graham Hill	Lotus 15	S 2.0	3	DNF	DNF
1959	(Italy) Scuderia Ferrari	(Brazil) Hermano da Silva Ramos	Ferrari 250 TR/59	S 3.0	41	DNF	DNF
1961	(United Kingdom) UDT Laystall Racing Team	(United Kingdom) Mike McKee	Lotus Elite	S 850	102	DNF	DNF
