= Cooper T45 =

Racing automobile

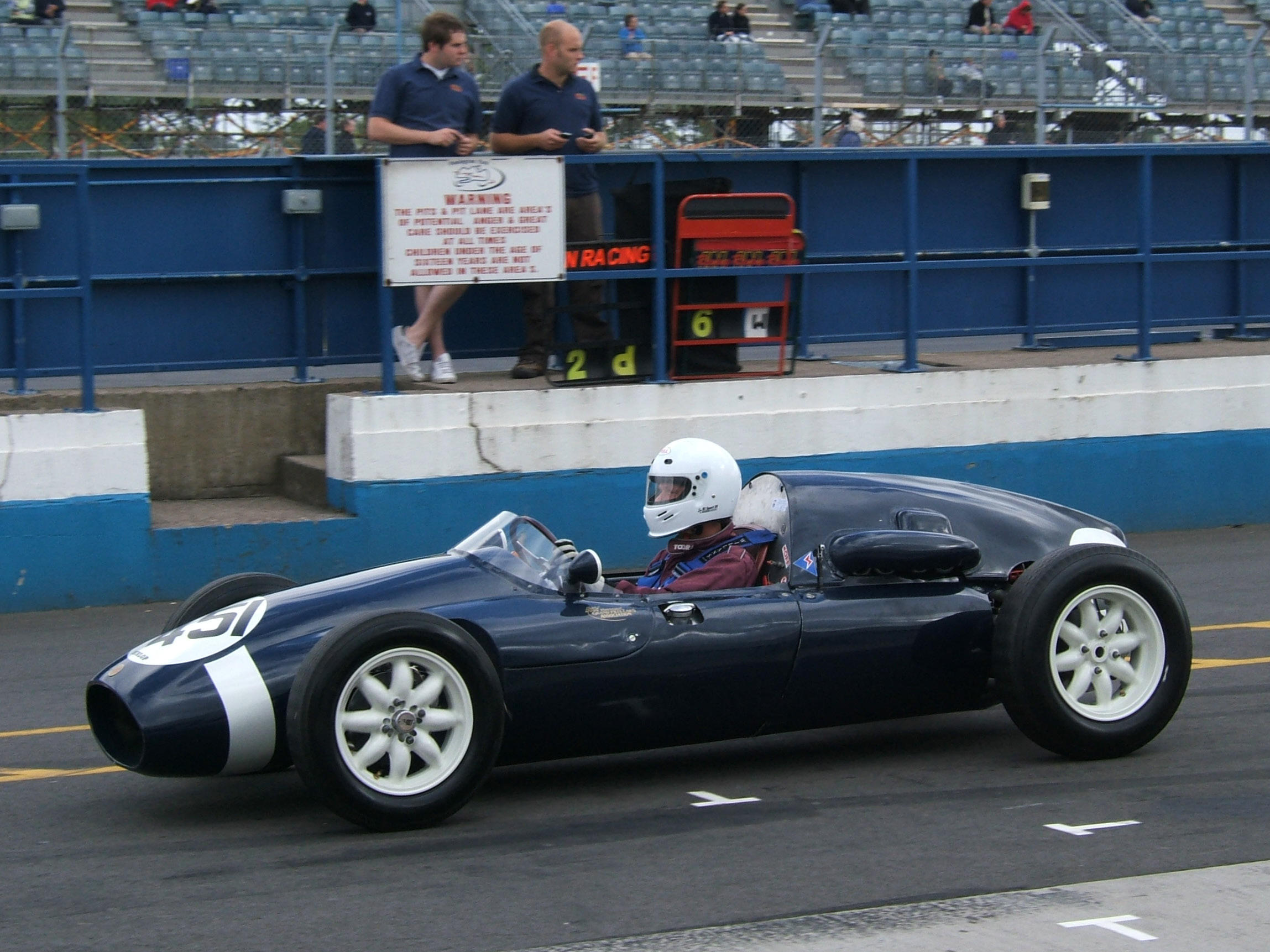
- Category: Formula One, Formula Two
- Constructor: Cooper Car Company
- Designer: Owen Maddock
- Predecessor: Cooper T43
- Successor: Cooper T51

Technical specifications
- Chassis: Steel spaceframe
- Suspension (front): Double wishbone, coil spring and damper
- Suspension (rear): Lower wishbone, transverse leaf spring with transverse link and damper
- Engine: Climax FPF, Maserati 2.5 or 1.5-litre straight-4, naturally aspirated, rear mid, longitudinally mounted.
- Transmission: manual gearbox.
- Tyres: Dunlop

Competition history
- Notable entrants: Cooper; R.R.C. Walker Racing Team
- Notable drivers: (Australia) Jack Brabham (France) Maurice Trintignant (United Kingdom) Roy Salvadori
- Debut: 1958 Monaco Grand Prix
Races	Wins	Poles	F/Laps
17	1	0	0

The Cooper T45 was an open-wheel formula racing car, developed and built by the Cooper Car Company in 1958, and designed by Owen Maddock. It competed in Formula 2 racing as well as in Formula One racing, where it won one World Championship Grand Prix, the 1958 Monaco Grand Prix, being driven by Maurice Trintignant.

== Development history and technology ==
The Cooper T45 was the successor to the Cooper T43. The chassis remained almost unchanged, but the wheel suspension was revised. The engine was lowered. Until 1959 the cars had drum brakes, which were then replaced by disc brakes.

== Racing history ==
For the Formula 1 version, Climax developed a 2.2-litre engine. Since this engine was exclusively available to the works team, Rob Walker had to resort to the 2-litre engine, which had less power. In 1958, Frenchman Maurice Trintignant surprisingly won the 1958 Monaco Grand Prix with the Walker 2-litre T45. However, the car lacked power on the fast stretches. Especially against the competition from Ferrari and Vanwall, the Coopers had no chance. Works driver Roy Salvadori was third at Silverstone and second at the Nürburgring and fourth overall in the Drivers' Championship. Cooper finished third in the Constructor's Championship, which was held for the first time.

== Complete Formula One World Championship results ==
(key) (results in bold indicate pole position, results in italics indicate fastest lap)

Year	Entrant	Engine	Tyres	Drivers	1	2	3	4	5	6	7	8	9	10	11	Points	WCC
1958	Cooper Car Company	Climax FPF L4	D		ARG	MON	NED	500	BEL	FRA	GBR	GER	POR	ITA	MOR	**31**^{1}	**3rd**^{1}
1958	Cooper Car Company	Climax FPF L4	D	Jack Brabham		4	8		Ret	6	6	Ret†	6	Ret	11†	**31**^{1}	**3rd**^{1}
1958	Cooper Car Company	Climax FPF L4	D	Roy Salvadori		Ret	4		8	11	3	2	9	5	7	**31**^{1}	**3rd**^{1}
1958	Cooper Car Company	Climax FPF L4	D	Ian Burgess							Ret					**31**^{1}	**3rd**^{1}
1958	Cooper Car Company	Climax FPF L4	D	Jack Fairman											8	**31**^{1}	**3rd**^{1}
1958	R.R.C. Walker Racing Team	Climax FPF L4	D	Maurice Trintignant		1	9					3		Ret	Ret	**31**^{1}	**3rd**^{1}
1959	High Efficiency Motors	Maserati L4	D		MON	500	NED	FRA	GBR	GER	POR	ITA	USA			**0**	-
1959	High Efficiency Motors	Maserati L4	D	Roy Salvadori	6			Ret					Ret			**0**	-
1959	High Efficiency Motors	Maserati L4	D	Jack Fairman								Ret				**0**	-
1959	High Efficiency Motors	Climax FPF L4	D	Jack Fairman					Ret							**40**^{2}	**1st**^{2}
1959	Jean Lucienbonnet	Climax FPF L4	D	Jean Lucienbonnet	DNQ											**40**^{2}	**1st**^{2}
1959	Equipe Alan Brown	Climax FPF L4	D	Mike Taylor					Ret							**40**^{2}	**1st**^{2}
1959	Equipe Alan Brown	Climax FPF L4	D	Peter Ashdown					12							**40**^{2}	**1st**^{2}
1959	Gilby Engineering	Climax FPF L4	D	Keith Greene					DNQ							**40**^{2}	**1st**^{2}
1959	R.H.H. Parnell	Climax FPF L4	D	Tim Parnell					DNQ							**40**^{2}	**1st**^{2}
1960	Equipe Nationale Belge	Climax FPF L4	D		ARG	MON	500	NED	BEL	FRA	GBR	POR	ITA	USA		**48 (58)**^{3}	**1st**^{3}
1960	Equipe Nationale Belge	Climax FPF L4	D	Lucien Bianchi					6							**48 (58)**^{3}	**1st**^{3}
1960	Arthur Owen	Climax FPF L4	D	Arthur Owen									Ret			**48 (58)**^{3}	**1st**^{3}
1960	Wolfgang Seidel	Climax FPF L4	D	Wolfgang Seidel									9			**48 (58)**^{3}	**1st**^{3}
1960	Gilby Engineering	Maserati L4	D	Keith Greene							Ret					**0**	-
1961	Fred Tuck Cars	Climax FPF 1.5 L4	D		MON	NED	BEL	FRA	GBR	GER	ITA	USA				**14 (18)**^{2}	**4th**^{2}
1961	Fred Tuck Cars	Climax FPF 1.5 L4	D	Jack Fairman							Ret					**14 (18)**^{2}	**4th**^{2}

† Formula Two entry.
^1 Points also scored by the Cooper T43.
^2 All points scored by other Cooper models.
^3 Points also scored by other Cooper models.
