= Dennis Taylor (racing driver) =

British racing driver (1921–1962)

- Born: 12 June 1921; Sidcup, Kent, England
- Died: 2 June 1962 (aged 40); Monte Carlo, Monaco

Formula One World Championship career
- Nationality: (United Kingdom) British
- Active years: 1959
- Team: privateer Lotus
- Entries: 1 (0 starts)
- Championships: 0
- Wins: 0
- Podiums: 0
- Career points: 0
- Pole positions: 0
- Fastest laps: 0
- First entry: 1959 British Grand Prix

Dennis Taylor (12 June 1921 – 2 June 1962) was a British racing driver from England. He competed in 500cc Formula 3 from 1952 to 1954. His single World Championship Formula One entry was at the 1959 British Grand Prix driving his Formula 2 Lotus 12, and he failed to qualify.

Taylor was killed in the Formula Junior race at Monte Carlo in 1962, ten days before his 41st birthday.

== Racing record ==
=== Complete Formula One World Championship results ===
(key)

Year	Entrant	Chassis	Engine	1	2	3	4	5	6	7	8	9	WDC	Points
1959	Dennis Taylor	Lotus 12 (F2)	Climax Straight-4	MON	500	NED	FRA	GBR; DNQ	GER	POR	ITA	USA	NC	0

=== Complete British Saloon Car Championship results ===
(key) (Races in bold indicate pole position; races in italics indicate fastest lap.)

Year	Team	Car	Class	1	2	3	4	5	6	7	8	9	Pos.	Pts	Class
1961	Peter Berry Racing Ltd	Jaguar Mk II 3.8	D	SNE; 3	GOO; 3	AIN; 6	SIL; 4	CRY; 4	SIL	BRH	OUL	SNE	16th	12	6th
