= Cooper T43 =

1957 racing car

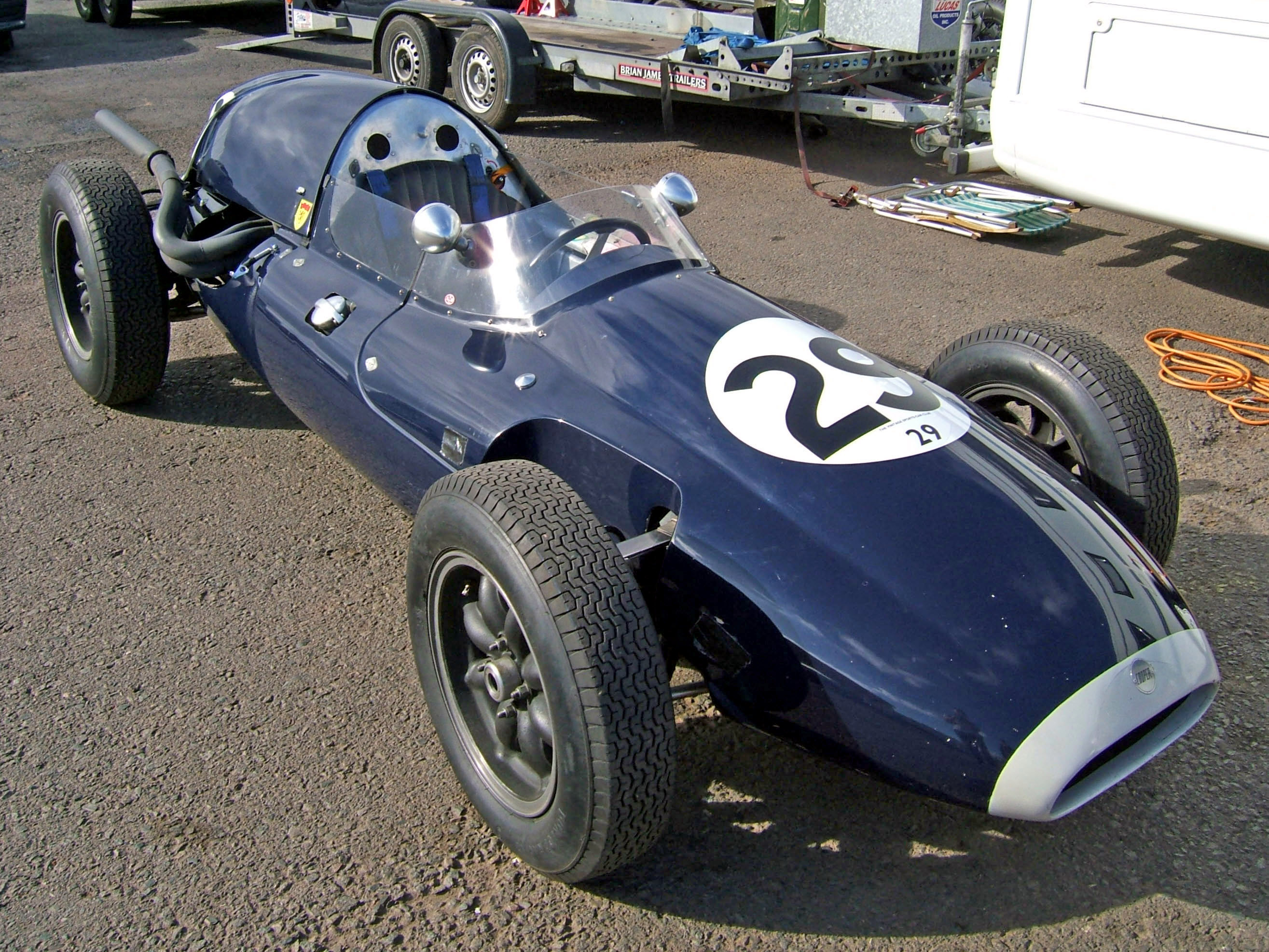
A Cooper T43 in Formula Two form

The Cooper T43 was a Formula One and Formula Two racing car designed and built by Cooper Car Company for the 1957 Formula One season, first appearing at the 1957 Monaco Grand Prix in a works car for Jack Brabham. The T43 earned a significant place in motor racing history when Stirling Moss drove a Rob Walker Racing Team T43 to win the 1958 Argentine Grand Prix, the first World Drivers' Championship win for a mid-engined car. Despite this achievement, the car was superseded almost immediately by the T45. The T43's last appearance in a World Championship event was the 1960 Italian Grand Prix.

Bob Gerard purchased a T43 chassis and fitted it with a Bristol engine. This car was given an official Cooper works number as the T44.

== Complete Formula One World Championship results ==
(key) (results in bold indicate pole position, results in italics indicate fastest lap)

Year	Entrant	Engine	Tyres	Drivers	1	2	3	4	5	6	7	8	9	10	11	Points	WCC
1957	Cooper Car Company	Climax FPF 2.0 L4	**D** **A**		ARG	MON	500	FRA	GBR	GER	PES	ITA				n/a^{1}	n/a^{1}
1957	Cooper Car Company	Climax FPF 2.0 L4	**D** **A**	Jack Brabham		6		7/ Ret^{^{2}}			7					n/a^{1}	n/a^{1}
1957	Cooper Car Company	Climax FPF 2.0 L4	**D** **A**	Les Leston		DNQ										n/a^{1}	n/a^{1}
1957	Cooper Car Company	Climax FPF 2.0 L4	**D** **A**	Mike MacDowel				7^{^{2}}								n/a^{1}	n/a^{1}
1957	Cooper Car Company	Climax FPF 2.0 L4	**D** **A**	Roy Salvadori					5		Ret					n/a^{1}	n/a^{1}
1957	Cooper Car Company	Climax FPF 1.5 L4	**D** **A**	Roy Salvadori						Ret^{^{3}}						n/a^{1}	n/a^{1}
1957	Rob Walker Racing Team	Climax FPF 1.5 L4	**D** **A**	Jack Brabham						Ret^{^{3}}						n/a^{1}	n/a^{1}
1957	Rob Walker Racing Team	Climax FPF 2.0 L4	**D** **A**	Jack Brabham					Ret							n/a^{1}	n/a^{1}
1957	J B Naylor	Climax FPF 1.5 L4	**D** **A**	Brian Naylor						13^{^{3}}						n/a^{1}	n/a^{1}
1957	Ridgeway Managements	Climax FPF 1.5 L4	**D** **A**	Tony Marsh						15^{^{3}}						n/a^{1}	n/a^{1}
1957	R Gibson	Climax FPF 1.5 L4	**D** **A**	Dick Gibson						Ret^{^{3}}						n/a^{1}	n/a^{1}
1957	F.R. Gerard	Bristol BS 2.0 L4	**D** **A**	Bob Gerard						6^{^{7}}						n/a^{1}	n/a^{1}
1958	Rob Walker Racing Team	Climax FPF 2.0 L4	**C** **D**		ARG	MON	NED	500	BEL	FRA	GBR	GER	POR	ITA	MOR	**31**^{4}	**3rd**^{4}
1958	Rob Walker Racing Team	Climax FPF 2.0 L4	**C** **D**	Stirling Moss	1											**31**^{4}	**3rd**^{4}
1958	Rob Walker Racing Team	Climax FPF 2.0 L4	**C** **D**	Ron Flockhart		DNQ										**31**^{4}	**3rd**^{4}
1958	Rob Walker Racing Team	Climax FPF 2.0 L4	**C** **D**	Maurice Trintignant							8		8			**31**^{4}	**3rd**^{4}
1958	Rob Walker Racing Team	Climax FPF 1.5 L4	**C** **D**	Wolfgang Seidel								Ret^{^{3}}				**31**^{4}	**3rd**^{4}
1958	Rob Walker Racing Team	Climax FPF 1.5 L4	**C** **D**	François Picard											Ret^{^{3}}	**31**^{4}	**3rd**^{4}
1958	High Efficiency Motors	Climax FPF 1.5 L4	**C** **D**	Ian Burgess								7^{^{3}}				**31**^{4}	**3rd**^{4}
1958	R Gibson	Climax FPF 1.5 L4	**C** **D**	Dick Gibson								Ret^{^{3}}				**31**^{4}	**3rd**^{4}
1958	Ecurie Eperon d'Or	Climax FPF 1.5 L4	**C** **D**	Christian Goethals								Ret^{^{3}}				**31**^{4}	**3rd**^{4}
1959	B.C. Ecclestone	Climax FPF 2.5 L4	**D**		MON	500	NED	FRA	GBR	GER	POR	ITA	USA			**40**^{5}	**1st**^{5}
1959	B.C. Ecclestone	Climax FPF 2.5 L4	**D**	Brian Whitehouse	DNA											**40**^{5}	**1st**^{5}
1959	Gilby Engineering	Climax FPF 1.5 L4	**D**	Keith Greene					DNQ							**40**^{5}	**1st**^{5}
1959	OSCA Automobili	OSCA Tipo 372 2.0 L4	**D**	Alejandro de Tomaso									Ret			**0**	-
1960	Scuderia Colonia	Climax FPF 1.5 L4	**D**		ARG	MON	500	NED	BEL	FRA	GBR	POR	ITA	USA		**48 (58)**^{6}	**1st**^{6}
1960	Scuderia Colonia	Climax FPF 1.5 L4	**D**	Piero Drogo									8			**48 (58)**^{6}	**1st**^{6}
1960	Equipe Prideaux/Dick Gibson	Climax FPF 1.5 L4	**D**	Vic Wilson									Ret			**48 (58)**^{6}	**1st**^{6}

^1 The World Constructors' Championship was not awarded before 1958.
^2 Shared drive.
^3 No points scored by the T43 as it was run in a Formula Two Category.
^4 Points also scored by the Cooper T45.
^5 Points also scored by the Cooper T51.
^6 Points also scored by the Cooper T51 and Cooper T53.
^7 Gerard's car designated T44.

== See also ==
The first true Formula One Coopers
