= Casimiro de Oliveira =

Portuguese racing driver

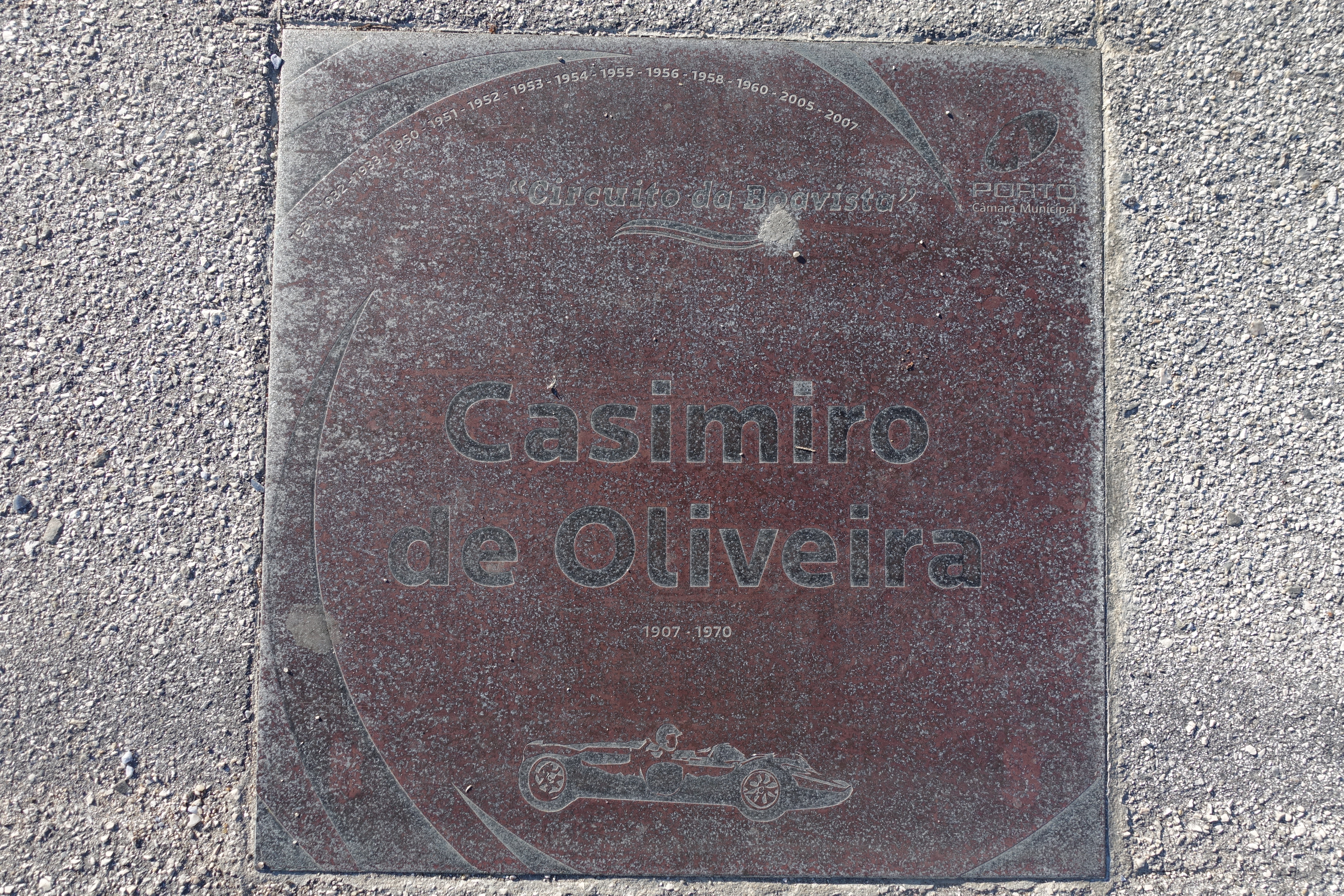
- Plaque to Casimiro de Oliveira in Porto, Portugal
- Born: 8 September 1907; Porto, Portugal
- Died: 22 November 1970 (aged 63); Porto, Portugal

Formula One World Championship career
- Nationality: (Portugal) Portuguese
- Active years: 1958
- Team: Non-works Maserati
- Entries: 1 (0 starts)
- First entry: 1958 Portuguese Grand Prix

Antonio Casimiro Pinto de Oliveira (8 September 1907 – 22 November 1970) was a Portuguese racing driver. He was entered for the 1958 Portuguese Grand Prix but he was not present during the weekend. He was responsible for organizing the event. His brother was Manoel de Oliveira, a famed film director who managed to survive him by nearly 45 years.

== Career ==
He began his career in motorsport before the Second World War, often driving with his brother, who briefly raced before starting his directing career. In 1937, he gained some attention by beating Tazio Nuvolari and Rudolf Hasse in a race at the Circuit International de Vila Real. Bugatti then appealed him to race at the Rio de Janeiro Grand Prix in 1938. He qualified last and eventually after a long race, finished fifth. The Second World War then stopped his racing career, like most drivers of that era. After the war, he raced in sports cars, winning the Portuguese Grand Prix in 1951 and finishing second in 1952 and 1953.

In 1958, he rented a Maserati 250F and was entered for the Portuguese Grand Prix. He failed a test run on the bumpy and dangerous Circuito da Boavista and withdrew from the event. He then decided to hang up his helmet for good.

He died in Porto in 1970 at the age of 63.

== Complete Formula One World Championship results ==
(key)

Year	Entrant	Chassis	Engine	1	2	3	4	5	6	7	8	9	10	11	WDC	Points
1958	Casimiro De Oliveira	Maserati 250F	Maserati Straight-6	ARG	MON	NED	500	BEL	FRA	GBR	GER	POR; DNA	ITA	MOR	NC	0
