= Bruce Kessler =

American racing driver and film director (1936–2024)

- Born: March 23, 1936; Seattle, Washington, U.S.
- Died: April 4, 2024 (aged 88)
- Occupations: Film director, television director
- Years active: 1962–1997

Formula One World Championship career
- Active years: 1958
- Team: Privateer Connaught
- Entries: 1 (0 starts)
- Championships: 0
- Wins: 0
- Podiums: 0
- Career points: 0
- Pole positions: 0
- Fastest laps: 0
- First entry: 1958 Monaco Grand Prix

Bruce Michael Kessler (March 23, 1936 – April 4, 2024) was an American racing driver and film and television director.

== Racing career ==
Kessler was born in Seattle, Washington, and grew up in Beverly Hills, California. He was the son of a clothing designer. In the early 1950s, he started racing his mother's Jaguar XK120 in the Sports Car Club of America races at sixteen years old. He raced the road race courses at Paramount Ranch and Willow Springs in California. He was a team driver along with Chuck Daigh for the Scarab race cars built by his good friend Lance Reventlow in the late 1950s.

Kessler entered one World Championship Formula One Grand Prix (Monaco 1958) with a Connaught owned by Bernie Ecclestone, but failed to qualify, although he posted the 21st-fastest time of the 28 entrants.

Kessler and Reventlow, driving Reventlow's Mercedes-Benz SL aluminum coupe had stopped at Blackwells Corner on CA Rt. 466/133 on September 30, 1955 on their way to the Salinas Road Races when James Dean and his mechanic, Rolf Wutherich, pulled in with Dean's Porsche Spyder. They all agreed to meet for dinner at Paso Robles, about 60 miles away that evening. Reventlow and Kessler took off ten minutes earlier. Dean never made it as he was involved in a fatal two-car crash at Rt. 466/41 near Cholame 30 miles away. Kessler remained the last person alive who spoke with James Dean before his death.

The Scarabs won the International Grand Prix at Riverside, California beating the famous driver Phil Hill in a Ferrari. Kessler was invited to Europe to drive at Le Mans.

On March 22, 1958, Kessler became class winner at "12 hour Florida International Grand Prix of Endurance for the AMOCO Trophy" (12 h Sebring), driving a Ferrari 250 GT LWB (#0773GT).

After a serious crash at the 1959 Examiner Grand Prix at Pomona, California, Kessler spent days in a coma. Soon after, he retired from racing.

== Film career ==
Kessler returned to California and became a film and television director. One of his earliest efforts was a short film he directed on the Scarab race car for his friend Lance Reventlow called The Sound of Speed.

As a film and television director, some of his credits include the television series The Monkees, The Flying Nun, Mission: Impossible, It Takes a Thief, Marcus Welby, M.D., The Rockford Files, McCloud, CHiPs, The Greatest American Hero, The A-Team, Mickey Spillane's Mike Hammer, Hunter, and Renegade, his final directing credit.

Kessler was a second unit director on Howard Hawks' Red Line 7000 (1965). Kessler directed the feature films Angels from Hell (1968), Killers Three (1968), The Gay Deceivers (1969), and Simon, King of the Witches (1971), as well as several made for television films.

Kessler was also a world class skeet and trap shooter. He was retired to Marina del Rey, California.

== Personal life ==
Kessler was married to Joan Freeman and had two brothers, poet and writer Stephen Kessler, who lives in northern California, and Rick, who lives near Palm Springs.

Kessler entered hospice care on March 31, 2024, and died on April 4, at the age of 88.

== Complete Formula One results ==
(key)

Year	Entrant	Chassis	Engine	1	2	3	4	5	6	7	8	9	10	11	WDC	Points
1958	Bernie Ecclestone	Connaught Type B	Alta Straight-4	ARG	MON; DNQ	NED	500	BEL	FRA	GBR	GER	POR	ITA	MOR	NC	0
