= Luigi Taramazzo =

Italian racing driver (1932–2004)

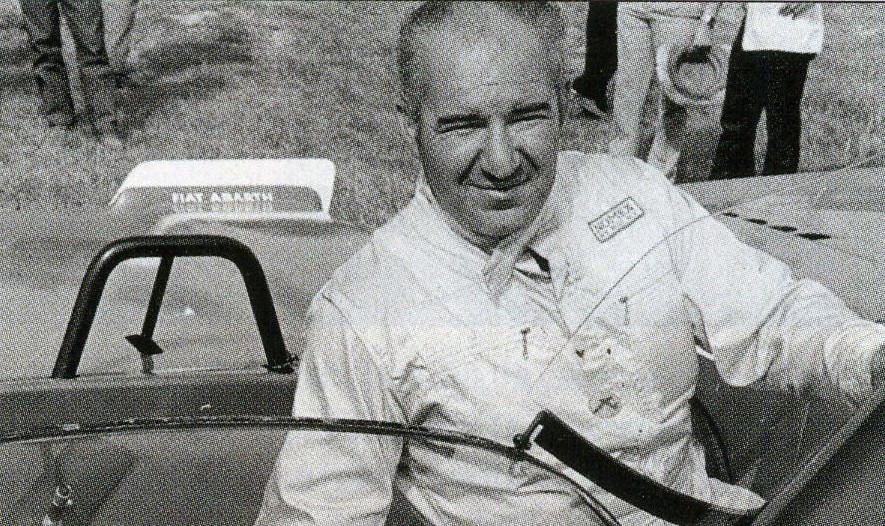
- Born: 5 May 1932; Ceva, Piedmont
- Died: 15 February 2004 (aged 71); Vallecrosia, Liguria

Formula One World Championship career
- Nationality: (Italy) Italian
- Active years: 1958
- Team: privateer Maserati
- Entries: 1 (0 starts)
- Championships: 0
- Wins: 0
- Podiums: 0
- Career points: 0
- Pole positions: 0
- Fastest laps: 0
- First entry: 1958 Monaco Grand Prix

Luigi Taramazzo (May 5, 1932 – February 15, 2004) was a racing driver from Italy. His single Formula One World Championship entry was at the 1958 Monaco Grand Prix, where he shared the Maserati 250F of Ken Kavanagh. Neither driver qualified the car, so Taramazzo did not start the race.

== Complete Formula One World Championship results ==
(key)

Year	Entrant	Chassis	Engine	1	2	3	4	5	6	7	8	9	10	11	WDC	Points
1958	Ken Kavanagh	Maserati 250F	Maserati Straight-6	ARG	MON; DNQ	NED	500	BEL	FRA	GBR	GER	POR	ITA	MOR	NC	0
