= François Picard (racing driver) =

French racing driver (1921–1996)

- Born: 26 April 1921; Villefranche-sur-Saône, Rhône, France
- Died: 29 April 1996 (aged 75); Nice, France

Formula One World Championship career
- Nationality: (France) French
- Active years: 1958
- Team: Rob Walker Racing Team
- Entries: 1
- Championships: 0
- Wins: 0
- Podiums: 0
- Career points: 0
- Pole positions: 0
- Fastest laps: 0
- First entry: 1958 Moroccan Grand Prix
- Last entry: 1958 Moroccan Grand Prix

24 Hours of Le Mans career
- Years: 1955–1958
- Teams: Ecurie Los Amigos

François Picard (26 April 1921 – 29 April 1996) was a racing driver from France. He participated in one Formula One Grand Prix, on 19 October 1958. He scored no championship points. This race was his last, as he crashed his Cooper into Olivier Gendebien's Ferrari, which had spun in front of him, and Picard suffered serious injuries. He eventually recovered, but never raced again.

== Complete Formula One results ==
(key)

Year	Entrant	Chassis	Engine	1	2	3	4	5	6	7	8	9	10	11	WDC	Points
1958	RRC Walker Racing Team	Cooper T43 (F2)	Climax Straight-4	ARG	MON	NED	500	BEL	FRA	GBR	GER	POR	ITA	MOR; Ret	NC	0

== Complete 24 Hours of Le Mans results ==
Year	Team	Co-drivers	Car	Class	Laps	Pos.	Class pos.
1956	(France) Equipe Los Amigos	(United States) Robert E. Tappan	Ferrari 500 TR	S2.0	N/A	DNF (Illegal refuel)	
1957	(France) Equipe Los Amigos	(France) Richie Ginther	Ferrari 500 TRC	S2.0	N/A	DNF (Water pump)	
1958	(France) Equipe Los Amigos	(Argentina) Jaroslav Juhan	Ferrari 250 TR	S3.0	N/A	DNF (Accident)	
