= André Testut =

Monégasque racing driver (1926–2005)

- Born: 13 April 1926; Lyon, France
- Died: 24 September 2005 (aged 79); Lyon, France

Formula One World Championship career
- Nationality: Monégasque
- Active years: 1958–1959
- Team: privateer Maserati
- Entries: 2 (0 starts)
- Championships: 0
- Wins: 0
- Podiums: 0
- Career points: 0
- Pole positions: 0
- Fastest laps: 0
- First entry: 1958 Monaco Grand Prix
- Last entry: 1959 Monaco Grand Prix

André Testut (13 April 1926 – 24 September 2005) was a French-born racing driver and team owner from Monaco.

== Career ==
Testut's debut in racing took place at the beginning of September 1956 at the Course de Cote de Vuillafans-Echevanne in France, driving an O.S.C.A. MT4 roadster where he finished second. This was followed up with a 3rd-place finish at the wheel of a Porsche 356 at the Coupe d’Automne toward the end of September.

In 1957, Testut partnered with his compatriot Louis Chiron for the 24th edition of the Mille Miglia. The two raced a Citroen DS19 under the monicker Montecarlo Team and finished in 103rd place.

Testut's victory at the Vuillafans-Echevannes sport car event in 1957 earned him a congratulatory letter from the Maserati brothers, who had formed OSCA after being forced out of their company bearing their name.

Testut entered two Formula One World Championship Grands Prix, both in Monaco, in 1958 and 1959. On both occasions, he drove his Maserati 250F and both times he failed to qualify. In 1958, he also entered a car for Chiron. For both drivers, it would be their last attempt to race in Monaco. Testut performed better at the 1958 Syracuse Grand Prix when he retired with engine failure when he was running seventh with ten laps to go.

== Complete Formula One World Championship results ==
(key)

Year	Entrant	Chassis	Engine	1	2	3	4	5	6	7	8	9	10	11	WDC	Points
1958	André Testut	Maserati 250F	Maserati Straight-6	ARG	MON; DNQ	NED	500	BEL	FRA	GBR	GER	POR	ITA	MOR	NC	0
1959	Monte Carlo Auto Sport	Maserati 250F	Maserati Straight-6	MON; DNQ	500	NED	FRA	GBR	GER	POR	ITA	USA			NC	0

== Complete Formula One Non-Championship results ==
(key) (Races in bold indicate pole position) (Races in italics indicate fastest lap)

Year	Entrant	Chassis	Engine	1	2	3	4	5
1958	André Testut	Maserati 250F	Maserati Straight-6	GLV	SYR; Ret	AIN	INT	CAE
