= Christian Goethals =

Belgian racing driver (1928–2003)

- Born: Christian Roger Xavier Marie Joseph Ghislain Goethals; 4 August 1928; Heule, Kortrijk, Belgium
- Died: 26 February 2003 (aged 74); Kortrijk, Belgium

Formula One World Championship career
- Nationality: (Belgium) Belgian
- Active years: 1958
- Team: non-works Cooper
- Entries: 1
- Championships: 0
- Wins: 0
- Podiums: 0
- Career points: 0
- Pole positions: 0
- Fastest laps: 0
- First entry: 1958 German Grand Prix

Christian Roger Xavier Marie Joseph Ghislain Goethals (4 August 1928 – 26 February 2003) was a racing driver from Belgium. Goethals competed as an amateur in sports car races, driving a Porsche Spyder during the 1950s. His best results were a second-place finish with his brother in the 1956 1500cc class event in Reims, and a win in the same class the following year at Forez. Goethals acquired a Cooper-Climax and entered it in the Formula Two class of the 1958 German Grand Prix, but retired from the race. He did not participate in another Formula One Grand Prix, and returned to sports cars, with notable finishes in 1960 of fifth in the Buenos Aires 1000 km and second in the GP de Spa. He retired from racing later in the season. He established a racing team called Écurie Éperon d'Or to participate in the 1958 German Grand Prix where he raced in a Cooper T43.

Goethals was the youngest child of René Goethals (1876-1928), a nobleman and mayor of Heule near Kortrijk in Belgium and of Jeanne Mols (1884-1968). He was married to Julie Opsomer.

== Biography in the Literature ==
- Steve SMALL, Grand Prix Who is Who, Travel Publishing, London 1999, ISBN 1-902007-46-8.
- Steve Small. The Guinness Complete Grand Prix Who's Who. p. 160. ISBN 0851127029.
- Humbert DE MARNIX DE SAINTE ALDEGONDE, État présent de la noblesse belge, Annuaire 2007, Brussel, 2007 (in French)
- Short biography in Grand Prix Insider

== Complete Formula One World Championship results ==
(key)

Year	Entrant	Chassis	Engine	1	2	3	4	5	6	7	8	9	10	11	WDC	Points
1958	Écurie Éperon d'Or	Cooper T43	Coventry Climax	ARG	MON	NED	500	BEL	FRA	GBR	GER; Ret	POR	ITA	MOR	NC	0
