= Giulio Cabianca =

Italian racing driver (1923–1961)

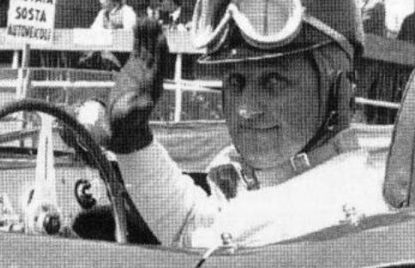
- Born: 19 February 1923; Verona, Italy
- Died: 15 June 1961 (aged 38); Modena Autodrome, Italy

Formula One World Championship career
- Nationality: (Italy) Italian
- Active years: 1958 - 1960
- Team(s): O.S.C.A., non-works Maserati & Cooper
- Entries: 4 (3 starts)
- Championships: 0
- Wins: 0
- Podiums: 0
- Career points: 3
- Pole positions: 0
- Fastest laps: 0
- First entry: 1958 Monaco Grand Prix
- Last entry: 1960 Italian Grand Prix

Giulio Cabianca (19 February 1923 – 15 June 1961) was a Formula One driver from Italy.

Cabianca was born in Verona, northern Italy. He participated in 4 World Championship Grands Prix, debuting on 18 May 1958. He scored a total of three championship points. He also participated in one non-Championship Formula One race. He also won the Dolomites Gold Cup Race in 1955.

Cabianca's death resulted from a bizarre incident at the Modena Autodrome test track in Italy. The Modena Autodrome was situated near Via Emilia, which crosses the city of Modena. Cabianca was testing a Cooper-Ferrari F1 car, owned by Scuderia Castellotti, when he suffered a suspected gearbox failure. Unable to stop, his Cooper went off track, struck a spectator and then went through the gate of the Autodrome which was open because of men at work near the track. The car crossed the Via Emilia, collided with several vehicles, then crashed against the wall of a coachbuilder shop. Cabianca was killed, as were a minivan driver, a motorcycle rider, and a bicyclist.

== Complete Formula One World Championship results ==
(key)

Year	Entrant	Chassis	Engine	1	2	3	4	5	6	7	8	9	10	11	WDC	Points
1958	O.S.C.A. Automobil	O.S.C.A. (F2)	O.S.C.A. Straight-4	ARG	MON; DNQ	NED	500	BEL	FRA	GBR	GER	POR			NC	0
1958	Jo Bonnier	Maserati 250F	Maserati Straight-6										ITA; Ret	MOR	NC	0
1959	Ottorino Volonterio	Maserati 250F	Maserati Straight-6	MON	500	NED	FRA	GBR	GER	POR	ITA; 15	USA			NC	0
1960	Scuderia Castellotti	Cooper T51	Ferrari Straight-4	ARG	MON	500	NED	BEL	FRA	GBR	POR	ITA; 4	USA		19th	3

=== Non-Championship results ===
(key) (Races in bold indicate pole position) (Races in italics indicate fastest lap)

Year	Entrant	Chassis	Engine	1	2	3	4	5	6
1958	O.S.C.A. Automobil	O.S.C.A. (F2)	O.S.C.A. Straight-4	BUE	GLV	SYR; Ret	AIN	INT	CAE

Preceded by Alan Stacey	Formula One fatal accidents 15 June 1961	Succeeded by Wolfgang von Trips
