= Gerino Gerini =

Italian racing driver (1928–2013)

- Born: 10 August 1928; Rome, Italy
- Died: 17 April 2013 (aged 84); Cremona, Italy

Formula One World Championship career
- Nationality: (Italy) Italian
- Active years: 1956, 1958
- Team: Maserati (inc. non-works)
- Entries: 7 (6 starts)
- Championships: 0
- Wins: 0
- Podiums: 0
- Career points: 1.5
- Pole positions: 0
- Fastest laps: 0
- First entry: 1956 Argentine Grand Prix
- Last entry: 1958 Moroccan Grand Prix

Gerino Gerini (10 August 1928 – 17 April 2013) was a racing driver from Italy.

A native of Rome, Gerini participated in seven World Championship Formula One Grands Prix, debuting on 22 January 1956. He scored 1.5 championship points. He also participated in numerous non-Championship Formula One races, as well as sports cars in both Ferraris and Maseratis.

== Complete Formula One World Championship results ==
(key)

Year	Entrant	Chassis	Engine	1	2	3	4	5	6	7	8	9	10	11	WDC	Points
1956	Officine Alfieri Maserati	Maserati 250F	Maserati Straight-6	ARG; 4 *											25th	1.5
1956	Scuderia Guastalla	Maserati 250F	Maserati Straight-6		MON	500	BEL	FRA	GBR	GER	ITA; 10				25th	1.5
1958	Scuderia Centro Sud	Maserati 250F	Maserati Straight-6	ARG	MON; DNQ	NED	500	BEL	FRA; 9	GBR; Ret	GER	POR	ITA; Ret	MOR; 12	NC	0

* Indicates shared drive with Chico Landi
