= Temple Hoyne Buell Jr. =

- Born: May 23, 1923; Denver, Colorado, U.S.
- Died: January 9, 1990 (aged 66); Santa Barbara, California, U.S.
- Occupation: Racing team owner · racing driver

Temple Hoyne Buell Jr. (May 23, 1923 – January 9, 1990) was a racing team owner and racing driver. He was the founder and owner of Scuderia Temple Buell, a racing team, that competed in the 1958 Formula One season.

== Early life and racing career ==
Temple Hoyne Buell Jr. was born on May 23, 1923, as the son of Temple Hoyne Buell and Marjorie Callae McIntosh, in Denver, Colorado. He raced a Ferrari 250 Testa Rossa and 2 Abarth 207A Spyder vehicles in sportscar races.

== Scuderia Temple Buell ==
Scuderia Temple Buell was the racing team of Temple Hoyne Buell Jr. The team first entered sportscar races with Masten Gregory. In the 1957 1000 km Buenos Aires, with Ferrari drivers Luigi Musso and Eugenio Castellotti being a part of his team, Scuderia Temple Buell won the race with the Ferrari 290 MM. The team failed to get Sterling Moss for the 1958 Formula One season.

=== 1958 Formula One season ===
In the 1958 Formula One season, Buell entered his team into the season with the Maserati 250F, with his connections to Maserati. The team entered the 1958 Portuguese Grand Prix with Carroll Shelby, who drove Masten Gregory also entered the 1958 Italian Grand Prix with another Maserati 250F. After the 1958 Italian Grand Prix, Shelby would leave the team, leaving Masten Gregory as the sole driver of the team for the 1958 Moroccan Grand Prix. After the race, due to the Maserati 250F being outdated, Scuderia Temple Buell chose to leave Formula One.

=== After Formula One ===
After the 1958 Formula One season, the team would re-enter both Maserati 250F cars for the Ardmore Grand Prix and the Lady Wigram Trophy in 1959, with Harry Schell and Carroll Shelby. After this, the team closed down.

== Personal life ==
In 1958, Buell married June Rose Buell. After the closure of his team, he later moved to California. He died on January 9, 1990, in Santa Barbara, California.
