= Formula One World Champion =

A Formula One World Champion is a racing driver or automobile constructor which has been designated such a title by the governing body of Formula One - the Fédération Internationale de l'Automobile (FIA). Every Formula One World Champion since the inaugural World Drivers' Championship in 1950 and the inaugural World Constructors' Championship in 1958 has been awarded the title by accumulating the required points during the course of the F1 season of that particular year, by participating in relevant Grands Prix.

The winner of the FIA Formula One World Drivers' Championship (WDC) is the most successful Formula One driver over a particular season, as determined by a points system based on individual Grand Prix results. Lewis Hamilton and Michael Schumacher hold the joint record for most Drivers' Championships with seven apiece.

The winner of the Formula One World Constructors' Championship (WCC) is the most successful Formula One constructor over a particular season, as determined by a points system. The Constructors' Championship was first awarded, as the International Cup for F1 Manufacturers, in 1958 to Vanwall. Ferrari hold the record for most Constructors' Championships with 16.

== See also ==
- List of Formula One Grands Prix
