= Circuito da Boavista =

Street circuit in Portugal

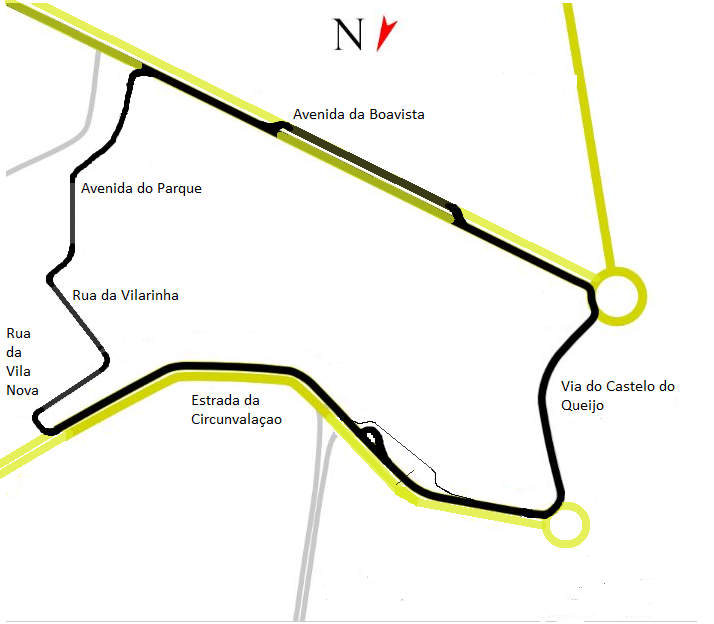
- Revival Circuit (2005–2013)

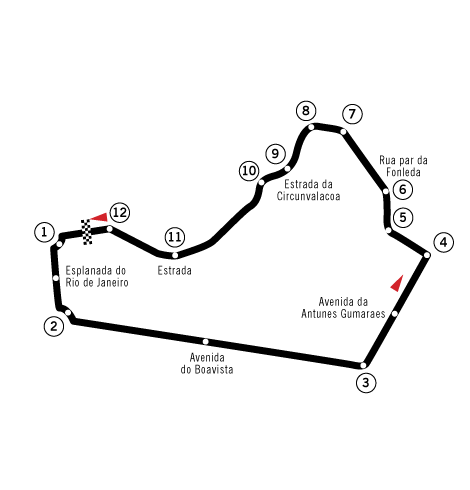
- Second Grand Prix Circuit (1952–1960)
- Location: Porto, Portugal
- Coordinates: 41°10′13.7″N 8°40′23.7″W
- Opened: First: 1950; Second: 8 July 2005; 20 years ago
- Closed: First: 14 August 1960; 65 years ago Second: 30 June 2013; 12 years ago
- Major events: WTCC Race of Portugal (2007, 2009, 2011, 2013); Portuguese GT Championship (2013); SEAT León Eurocup (2009); International Formula Master (2007); Italian Touring Car Competition (2007); Formula One Portuguese Grand Prix (1958, 1960); Sports car racing Portuguese Grand Prix (1951–1953, 1955)

Revival Circuit (2005–2013)
- Length: 4.800 km (2.983 mi)
- Turns: 23
- Race lap record: 1:54.125 ( (New Zealand) Chris van der Drift, Tatuus N.T07, 2007, IFM)

Second Grand Prix Circuit (1952–1960)
- Length: 7.406 km (4.602 mi)
- Turns: 19
- Race lap record: 2:27.530 ( (United Kingdom) John Surtees, Lotus 18, 1960, F1)

Original Grand Prix Circuit (1950–1951)
- Length: 7.775 km (4.831 mi)
- Turns: 19
- Race lap record: 3:32.800 ( (Italy) Giovanni Bracco, Ferrari 340 America, 1951, Sports car racing)

Circuito da Boavista is a street circuit in Porto, Portugal, which was used twice for the Formula One Portuguese Grand Prix. The original course began at the harbor-front "Esplanada do Rio de Janeiro", continued on "Avenida da Boavista", (hence the circuit's name), and then twisted its way through small neighborhoods back to the start-finish line.

The first Grand Prix was held in 1958, and saw an act of sportsmanship by Stirling Moss. Moss came to the defense of his countryman and title rival Mike Hawthorn, who faced a penalty for having driven towards oncoming traffic after a spin. Moss persuaded the stewards not to disqualify Hawthorn, who retained his second place and 6 points. Hawthorn eventually won the drivers championship by 1 point over Moss.

The 1960 running was a race of attrition, with only four cars finishing within five laps of winner Jack Brabham. Accidents and mechanical problems ended the day early for future champions John Surtees, Phil Hill, Graham Hill and others.

Season	Driver	Car/Motor	Report
1951	(Portugal) Casimiro de Oliveira	Ferrari	Report
1952	(Italy) Eugenio Castellotti	Ferrari	Report
1953	(Portugal) José Arroyo Nogueira Pinto	Ferrari	Report
Not held in 1954
1955	(France) Jean Behra	Maserati	Report
Not held in 1956 and 1957
1958	(United Kingdom) Stirling Moss	Vanwall	Report
Not held in 1959
1960	(Australia) Jack Brabham	Cooper-Climax	Report

== Recent years ==
The circuit was revived in 2005, though it was shortened from the original layout, and measured as 4.800 km (2.983 mi). Events were held every two years. Besides the Boavista Historic Grand Prix, there are also races for recent car models. In 2007, 2009, 2011 and 2013 the track staged the FIA WTCC Race of Portugal, an event which included in its programme European motorsport categories such as International Formula Master and Portuguese national competitions.

In 2015 the Porto City Council decided to suspend the circuit, saying that following a cut in support from Turismo de Portugal, spending about three million euros on the event would be irresponsible.

FIA WTCC Race of Portugal-Boavista
Year	Race	Driver	Manufacturer	Report
2007	Race 1	(Switzerland) Alain Menu	(United States) Chevrolet	Report
2007	Race 2	(United Kingdom) Andy Priaulx	(Germany) BMW	Report
2009	Race 1	(Italy) Gabriele Tarquini	(Spain) SEAT	Report
2009	Race 2	(Brazil) Augusto Farfus	(Germany) BMW	Report
2011	Race 1	(Switzerland) Alain Menu	(United States) Chevrolet	Report
2011	Race 2	(United Kingdom) Robert Huff	(United States) Chevrolet	Report
2013	Race 1	(France) Yvan Muller	(United States) Chevrolet	Report
2013	Race 2	(United Kingdom) James Nash	(United States) Chevrolet	Report

== Lap records ==
The fastest official race lap records at the Circuito da Boavista are listed as:

Category	Time	Driver	Vehicle	Event
Revival Grand Prix Circuit (2005–2013): 4.800 km (2.983 mi)
International Formula Master	1:54.125	Chris van der Drift	Tatuus N.T07	2007 Boavista Formula Master round
Super 2000	2:05.846	Robert Huff	Chevrolet Cruze 1.6T	2011 FIA WTCC Race of Portugal
SEAT León Eurocup	2:14.195	Massimiliano Pedalà	SEAT León Supercopa	2009 Boavista SEAT León Eurocup round
Second Grand Prix Circuit (1952–1960): 7.406 km (4.602 mi)
Formula One	2:27.530	John Surtees	Lotus 18	1960 Portuguese Grand Prix
Sports car racing	2:46.401	Alfonso de Portago	Ferrari 857 Monza	1956 Boavista sports car race
Original Grand Prix Circuit (1950–1951): 7.775 km (4.831 mi)
Sports car racing	3:32.800	Giovanni Bracco	Ferrari 340 America	1951 Portuguese Grand Prix
