= 1958 Formula One season =

12th season of Formula One motor racing

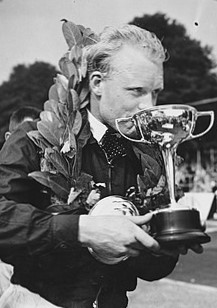
Mike Hawthorn won his first and only championship (and the first for a British driver), driving for Scuderia Ferrari.

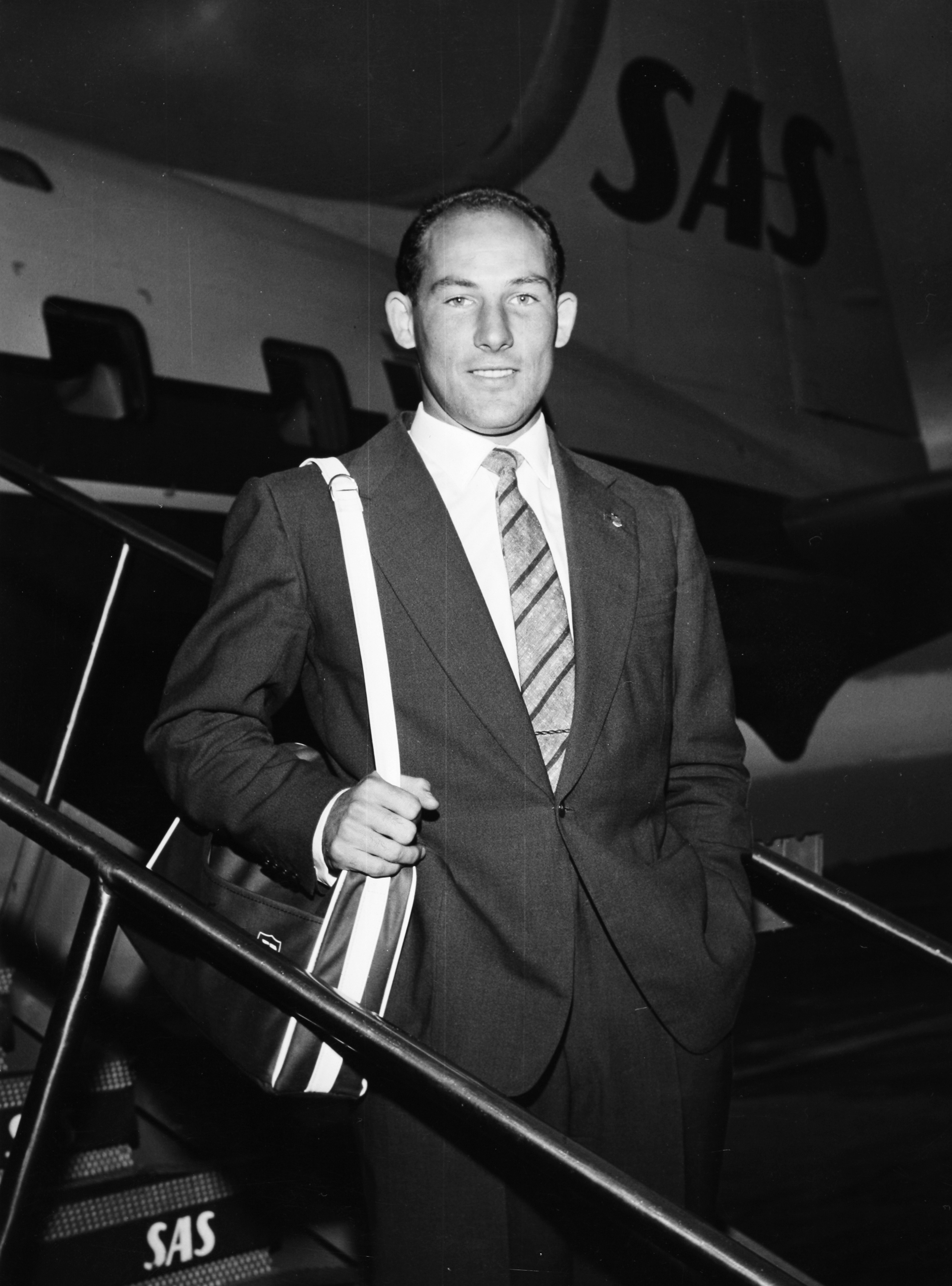
Hawthorn's compatriot, Stirling Moss, finished as runner-up in the World Drivers' Championship for the fourth season in a row.

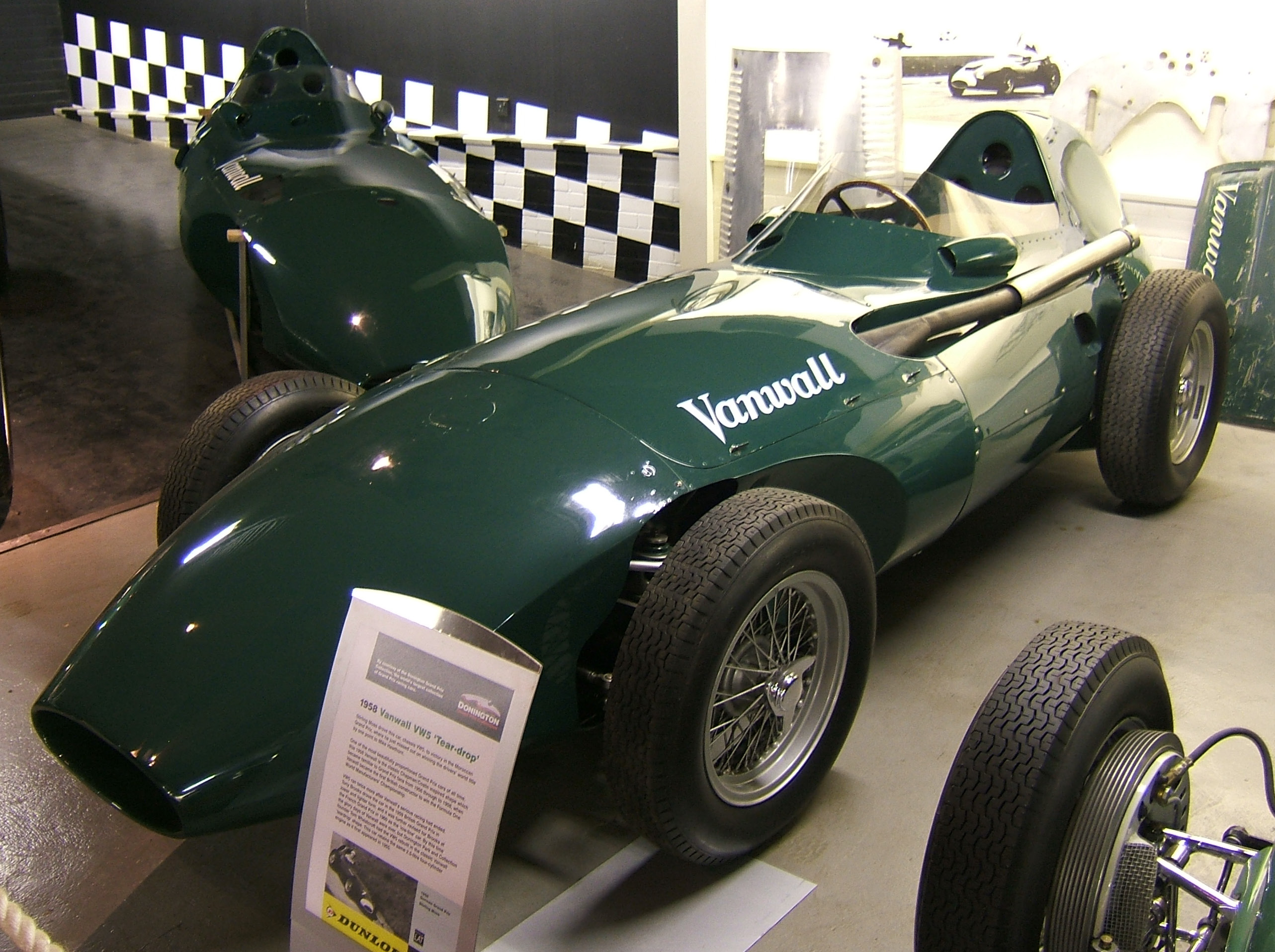
Vanwall won the first International Cup for F1 Manufacturers with the Vanwall VW 5.

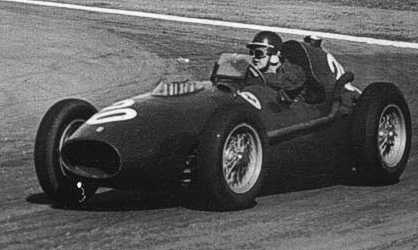
Ferrari finished runner-up in the International Cup for F1 Manufacturers with Ferrari 246 and 156.

The 1958 Formula One season was the 12th season of FIA Formula One motor racing. It featured the 9th World Championship of Drivers, the first International Cup for F1 Manufacturers and five non-championship Formula One races. The World Championship was contested over eleven races between 19 January and 19 October 1958. The Indianapolis 500 counted towards the Drivers' Championship but not the Manufacturers' Cup.

1958 was a watershed year that saw the end of the dominance of Italian teams, and the end of the career of five time World Champion Juan Manuel Fangio. The Maestro took pole and fastest lap in the first round, took a leave to test for the Indy 500, then retired after finishing fourth again in his second race, realizing his time and that of Maserati had gone. Nearly all 1958 races were won by British drivers, and no less than five Brits led the final standings. British engineering took over, too. The season began with two wins for the nimble Rear mid-engine, rear-wheel-drive layout cars that would dominate F1 from 1959 onwards. After the two Cooper-Climax wins, scored by the private Rob Walker team, not by the Cooper "factory" nor by a Coventry Climax entry, newcomer Vanwall with a standard layout front engine car won six of the eight remaining GPs and the Manufacturers Cup, without producing cars for customers to take advantage of the new title. Maseratis failed to score a podium and were outclassed without Fangio, but Ferraris won twice, and were quick and reliable enough to win six second places and the Drivers' Championship.

British driver Mike Hawthorn driving for Ferrari won his first and only Drivers' Championship after a close battle with compatriot and perpetual runner-up Stirling Moss, becoming the first British driver to become Formula One World Champion. Following the Portuguese Grand Prix, Hawthorn faced a penalty, but Moss sportingly spoke up for him. Moss would go on to win four races over Hawthorn's one, but the points from the Portuguese round enabled Hawthorn to claim the title. It was the first of only two occasions in Formula One history where a driver won the championship, having won only one race in the season, the other being Keke Rosberg in 1982. Vanwall won the inaugural Manufacturers' Cup.

Four drivers died during the season: American Pat O'Connor during the Indianapolis 500, Italian Luigi Musso (Ferrari) during the French Grand Prix, his British teammate Peter Collins during the German Grand Prix, and Brit Stuart Lewis-Evans (Vanwall) during the Moroccan Grand Prix. After Collins' accident, Hawthorn had decided to retire from racing at the end of the season. So he did, but then was killed in a road accident three months later.

Since the early 1900s, Grand Prix racing had been dominated by front-engined cars, but this was the last championship to be won by one. In single seaters, the driver either has to sit on top of the drive shaft, or next to an asymmetric drive train. Even though Porsche-designed Auto Union Silver Arrows had successfully demonstrated the Rear mid-engine, rear-wheel-drive layout in the 1930s, and some of the Porsche 550 sportscars that had been introduced in 1953 even ran competitively as Formula Two in the 1957 German Grand Prix, no F1 driver was put in front of his engine until the Bugatti Type 251 showed up in 1956. From 1959 on, mid-engined cars, with their better road holding, increased driving comfort, lighter weight, and ease on tyres and mechanical components (particularly brakes), would have the upper hand.

== Teams and drivers ==
The following teams and drivers competed in the 1958 FIA World Championship.

Entrant	Constructor	Chassis	Engine	Tyre	Driver	Rounds
(Argentina) Scuderia Sud Americana	Maserati	250F	Maserati 250F1 2.5 L6	P	(Argentina) Juan Manuel Fangio	1
(Argentina) Scuderia Sud Americana	Maserati	250F	Maserati 250F1 2.5 L6	P	(Argentina) Carlos Menditeguy	1
(Australia) Ken Kavanagh	Maserati	250F	Maserati 250F1 2.5 L6	P	(France) Jean Behra	1
(Australia) Ken Kavanagh	Maserati	250F	Maserati 250F1 2.5 L6	P	(Italy) Luigi Taramazzo	2
(Australia) Ken Kavanagh	Maserati	250F	Maserati 250F1 2.5 L6	P	(Australia) Ken Kavanagh	2, 5
(Sweden) Jo Bonnier	Maserati	250F	Maserati 250F1 2.5 L6	P	(United States) Harry Schell	1
(Sweden) Jo Bonnier	Maserati	250F	Maserati 250F1 2.5 L6	P	(Sweden) Jo Bonnier	2–3, 5, 7, 9
(Sweden) Jo Bonnier	Maserati	250F	Maserati 250F1 2.5 L6	P	(United States) Phil Hill	6
(Sweden) Jo Bonnier	Maserati	250F	Maserati 250F1 2.5 L6	P	(Italy) Giulio Cabianca	10
(Sweden) Jo Bonnier	Maserati	250F	Maserati 250F1 2.5 L6	P	(West Germany) Hans Herrmann	10–11
(Spain) Francesco Godia Sales	Maserati	250F	Maserati 250F1 2.5 L6	P	(Spain) Paco Godia	1–2, 5–6
(United Kingdom) H.H. Gould	Maserati	250F	Maserati 250F1 2.5 L6	D	(United Kingdom) Horace Gould	1–3
(United Kingdom) H.H. Gould	Maserati	250F	Maserati 250F1 2.5 L6	D	(United States) Masten Gregory	3
(United Kingdom) R.R.C. Walker Racing Team	Cooper-Climax	T43; T45	Climax FPF 2.0 L4	C D	(United Kingdom) Stirling Moss	1
(United Kingdom) R.R.C. Walker Racing Team	Cooper-Climax	T43; T45	Climax FPF 2.0 L4	C D	(France) Maurice Trintignant	2–3, 7–11
(United Kingdom) R.R.C. Walker Racing Team	Cooper-Climax	T43; T45	Climax FPF 2.0 L4	C D	(United Kingdom) Ron Flockhart	2
(United Kingdom) R.R.C. Walker Racing Team	Cooper-Climax	T43	Climax FPF 1.5 L4	D	(West Germany) Wolfgang Seidel	8
(United Kingdom) R.R.C. Walker Racing Team	Cooper-Climax	T43	Climax FPF 1.5 L4	D	(France) François Picard	11
(Italy) Scuderia Ferrari	Ferrari	246	Ferrari 143 2.4 V6	E	(Italy) Luigi Musso	1–3, 5–6
(Italy) Scuderia Ferrari	Ferrari	246	Ferrari 143 2.4 V6	E	(United Kingdom) Peter Collins	1–3, 5–8
(Italy) Scuderia Ferrari	Ferrari	246	Ferrari 143 2.4 V6	E	(United Kingdom) Mike Hawthorn	1–3, 5–11
(Italy) Scuderia Ferrari	Ferrari	246	Ferrari 143 2.4 V6	E	(West Germany) Wolfgang von Trips	2, 6–10
(Italy) Scuderia Ferrari	Ferrari	246	Ferrari 143 2.4 V6	E	(Belgium) Olivier Gendebien	5, 10–11
(Italy) Scuderia Ferrari	Ferrari	246	Ferrari 143 2.4 V6	E	(United States) Phil Hill	10–11
(Italy) Scuderia Ferrari	Ferrari	156	Ferrari D156 1.5 V6	E	(United States) Phil Hill	8
(United Kingdom) Owen Racing Organisation	BRM	P25	BRM P25 2.5 L4	D	(France) Jean Behra	2–3, 5–11
(United Kingdom) Owen Racing Organisation	BRM	P25	BRM P25 2.5 L4	D	(United States) Harry Schell	2–3, 5–11
(United Kingdom) Owen Racing Organisation	BRM	P25	BRM P25 2.5 L4	D	(France) Maurice Trintignant	6
(United Kingdom) Owen Racing Organisation	BRM	P25	BRM P25 2.5 L4	D	(Sweden) Jo Bonnier	10–11
(United Kingdom) Owen Racing Organisation	BRM	P25	BRM P25 2.5 L4	D	(United Kingdom) Ron Flockhart	11
(United Kingdom) Bernie C. Ecclestone	Connaught-Alta	B	Alta GP 2.5 L4	A	(United Kingdom) Bernie Ecclestone	2, 7
(United Kingdom) Bernie C. Ecclestone	Connaught-Alta	B	Alta GP 2.5 L4	A	(United States) Bruce Kessler	2
(United Kingdom) Bernie C. Ecclestone	Connaught-Alta	B	Alta GP 2.5 L4	A	(United Kingdom) Paul Emery	2
(United Kingdom) Bernie C. Ecclestone	Connaught-Alta	B	Alta GP 2.5 L4	A	(United Kingdom) Jack Fairman	7
(United Kingdom) Bernie C. Ecclestone	Connaught-Alta	B	Alta GP 2.5 L4	A	(United Kingdom) Ivor Bueb	7
(United Kingdom) Cooper Car Company	Cooper-Climax	T45; T44	Climax FPF 2.0 L4	D	(Australia) Jack Brabham	2–3, 5–7, 9–10
(United Kingdom) Cooper Car Company	Cooper-Climax	T45; T44	Climax FPF 2.0 L4	D	(United Kingdom) Roy Salvadori	2–3, 5–11
(United Kingdom) Cooper Car Company	Cooper-Climax	T45; T44	Climax FPF 2.0 L4	D	(United Kingdom) Ian Burgess	7
(United Kingdom) Cooper Car Company	Cooper-Climax	T45; T44	Climax FPF 2.0 L4	D	(United Kingdom) Jack Fairman	11
(United Kingdom) Cooper Car Company	Cooper-Climax	T45	Climax FPF 1.5 L4	D	(New Zealand) Bruce McLaren	8, 11
(United Kingdom) Cooper Car Company	Cooper-Climax	T45	Climax FPF 1.5 L4	D	(Australia) Jack Brabham	8, 11
(United Kingdom) Team Lotus	Lotus-Climax	12; 16	Climax FPF 2.0 L4; Climax FPF 2.2 L4	D	(United Kingdom) Cliff Allison	2–3, 5–8, 10–11
(United Kingdom) Team Lotus	Lotus-Climax	12; 16	Climax FPF 2.0 L4; Climax FPF 2.2 L4	D	(United Kingdom) Graham Hill	2–3, 5–7, 9–11
(United Kingdom) Team Lotus	Lotus-Climax	12; 16	Climax FPF 2.0 L4; Climax FPF 2.2 L4	D	(United Kingdom) Alan Stacey	7
(United Kingdom) Team Lotus	Lotus-Climax	16	Climax FPF 1.5 L4	D	(United Kingdom) Graham Hill	8
(United Kingdom) Vandervell Products	Vanwall	VW 5	Vanwall 254 2.5 L4	D	(United Kingdom) Stirling Moss	2–3, 5–11
(United Kingdom) Vandervell Products	Vanwall	VW 5	Vanwall 254 2.5 L4	D	(United Kingdom) Tony Brooks	2–3, 5–11
(United Kingdom) Vandervell Products	Vanwall	VW 5	Vanwall 254 2.5 L4	D	(United Kingdom) Stuart Lewis-Evans	2–3, 5–7, 9–11
(Italy) Maria Teresa de Filippis	Maserati	250F	Maserati 250F1 2.5 L6	P	(Italy) Maria Teresa de Filippis	2, 5, 10
(Italy) Giorgio Scarlatti	Maserati	250F	Maserati 250F1 2.5 L6	P	(Italy) Giorgio Scarlatti	2–3
(Italy) Giorgio Scarlatti	Maserati	250F	Maserati 250F1 2.5 L6	P	(Sweden) Jo Bonnier	6
(Italy) Scuderia Centro Sud	Maserati	250F	Maserati 250F1 2.5 L6	P	(Italy) Gerino Gerini	2, 6–7, 10–11
(Italy) Scuderia Centro Sud	Maserati	250F	Maserati 250F1 2.5 L6	P	(France) Maurice Trintignant	5
(Italy) Scuderia Centro Sud	Maserati	250F	Maserati 250F1 2.5 L6	P	(United States) Masten Gregory	5
(Italy) Scuderia Centro Sud	Maserati	250F	Maserati 250F1 2.5 L6	P	(West Germany) Wolfgang Seidel	5, 11
(Italy) Scuderia Centro Sud	Maserati	250F	Maserati 250F1 2.5 L6	P	(United States) Carroll Shelby	6–7, 10
(Italy) Scuderia Centro Sud	Maserati	250F	Maserati 250F1 2.5 L6	P	(United States) Troy Ruttman	6, 8
(Italy) Scuderia Centro Sud	Maserati	250F	Maserati 250F1 2.5 L6	P	(Sweden) Jo Bonnier	8
(Italy) Scuderia Centro Sud	Maserati	250F	Maserati 250F1 2.5 L6	P	(West Germany) Hans Herrmann	8
(Italy) Scuderia Centro Sud	Maserati	250F	Maserati 250F1 2.5 L6	P	(United Kingdom) Cliff Allison	9
(Italy) Scuderia Centro Sud	Maserati	250F	Maserati 250F1 2.5 L6	P	(Italy) Maria Teresa de Filippis	9
(Italy) OSCA Automobili	OSCA	F2	OSCA 372 1.5 L4	P	(Italy) Giulio Cabianca	2
(Italy) OSCA Automobili	OSCA	F2	OSCA 372 1.5 L4	P	(Italy) Luigi Piotti	2
(Monaco) André Testut	Maserati	250F	Maserati 250F1 2.5 L6	P	(Monaco) André Testut	2
(Monaco) André Testut	Maserati	250F	Maserati 250F1 2.5 L6	P	(Monaco) Louis Chiron	2
(Netherlands) Ecurie Maarsbergen	Porsche	RSK	Porsche 547/3 1.5 F4	D	(Netherlands) Carel Godin de Beaufort	3
(Netherlands) Ecurie Maarsbergen	Porsche	RS550	Porsche 547/3 1.5 F4	D	(Netherlands) Carel Godin de Beaufort	8
(Argentina) Juan Manuel Fangio	Maserati	250F	Maserati 250F1 2.5 L6	P	(Argentina) Juan Manuel Fangio	6
(United Kingdom) Dick Gibson	Cooper-Climax	T43	Climax FPF 1.5 L4	D	(United Kingdom) Dick Gibson	8
(West Germany) Dr Ing F. Porsche KG	Porsche	RSK	Porsche 547/3 1.5 F4	?	(West Germany) Edgar Barth	8
(United Kingdom) High Efficiency Motors	Cooper-Climax	T43	Climax FPF 1.5 L4	D	(United Kingdom) Ian Burgess	8
(Belgium) Ecurie Eperon d'Or	Cooper-Climax	T43	Climax FPF 1.5 L4	D	(Belgium) Christian Goethals	8
(United Kingdom) Ecurie Demi Litre	Lotus-Climax	12	Climax FPF 1.5 L4	D	(United Kingdom) Ivor Bueb	8
(United Kingdom) J.B. Naylor	Cooper-Climax	T45	Climax FPF 1.5 L4	D	(United Kingdom) Brian Naylor	8
(United Kingdom) Tony Marsh	Cooper-Climax	T45	Climax FPF 1.5 L4	D	(United Kingdom) Tony Marsh	8
(United States) Temple Buell	Maserati	250F	Maserati 250F1 2.5 L6	D	(United States) Carroll Shelby	9–10
(United States) Temple Buell	Maserati	250F	Maserati 250F1 2.5 L6	D	(United States) Masten Gregory	10–11
(France) André Guelfi	Cooper-Climax	T45	Climax FPF 1.5 L4	D	(France) André Guelfi	11
(United Kingdom) British Racing Partnership	Cooper-Climax	T45	Climax FPF 1.5 L4	D	(United Kingdom) Tom Bridger	11
(Morocco) Robert La Caze	Cooper-Climax	T45	Climax FPF 1.5 L4	D	(Morocco) Robert La Caze	11

- The above list does not include drivers who only contested the Indianapolis 500.
- Pink background denotes Formula Two cars at the German and Moroccan Grand Prix.

=== Team and driver changes ===
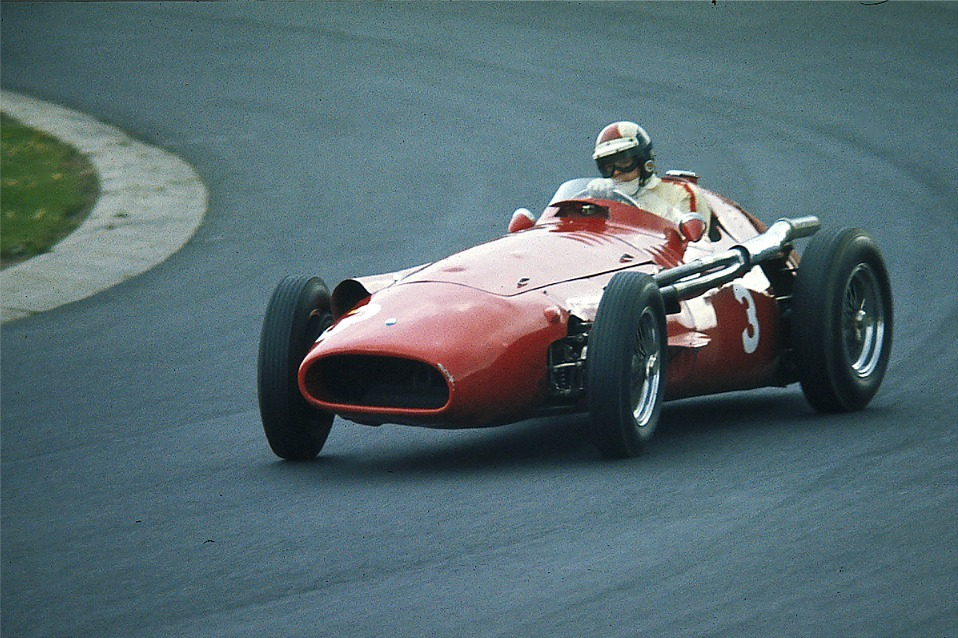
Maserati withdrew their works team, but their successful chassis was adopted by multiple private entries.

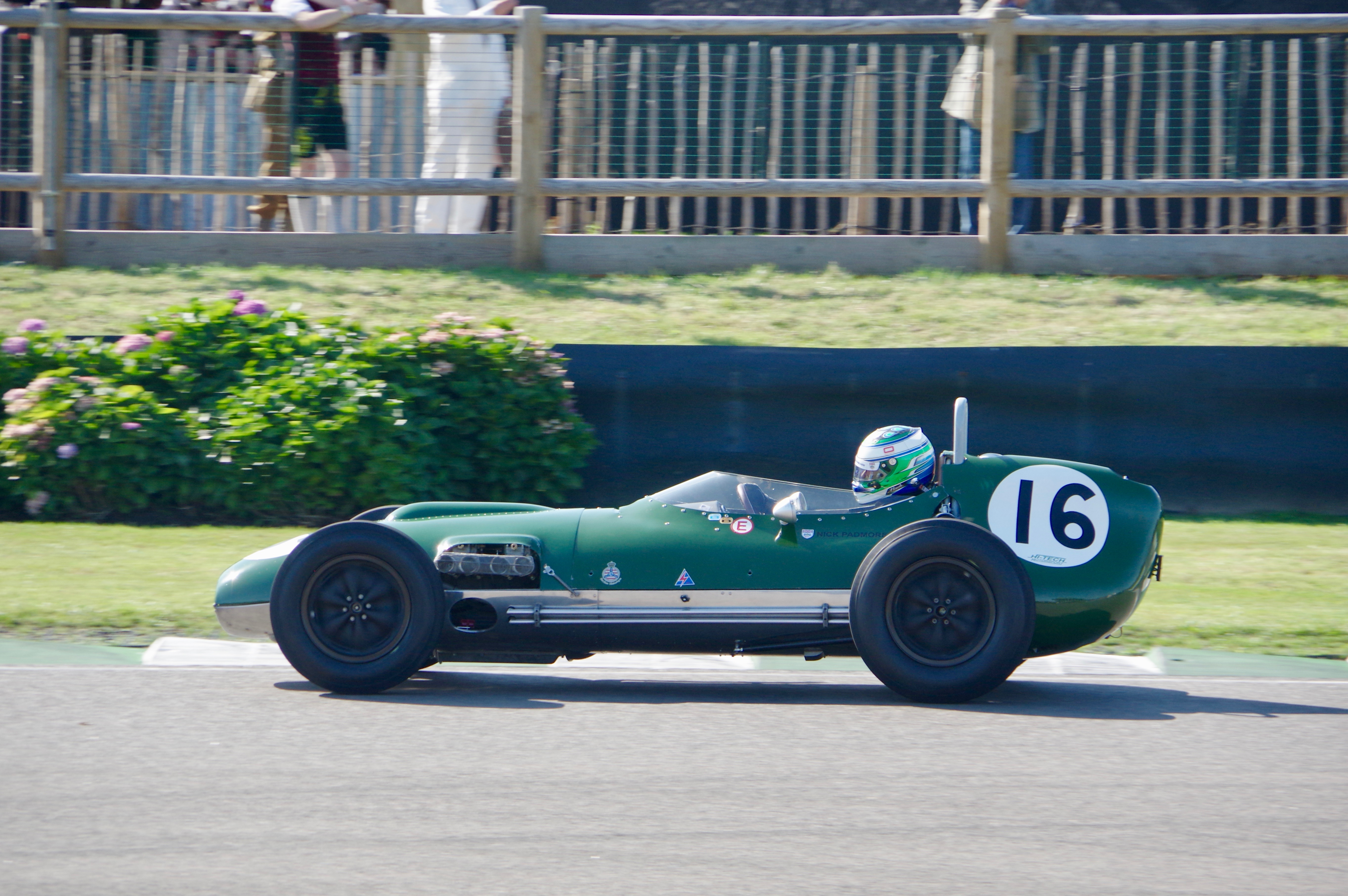
Team Lotus debuted in F1 with the Lotus 16 (pictured in 2019).

- Due to financial difficulties, Maserati had withdrawn their works team after 1957, despite their 250F still being competitive. Multiple private teams adopted the existing chassis.
- Lotus made their debut. Colin Chapman's team would go on to win six Drivers' and seven Constructors' Championships in the next twenty years.
- For BRM, it was their first full-time season, and they hired ex-Maserati drivers Jean Behra and Harry Schell.
- Cooper also entered more races than ever, while retaining their drivers from 1957.

==== Mid-season changes ====
- Ferrari driver Luigi Musso was fatally injured during the French Grand Prix when he ran wide, his car struck a ditch and somersaulted. He was airlifted to hospital with critical head injuries and died later that day.
- His teammate Peter Collins was killed in a very similar crash during the German Grand Prix. Collins ran wide, encountered a ditch and flipped into the air. Collins was thrown out and struck a tree, suffering critical head injuries, and died in hospital later that day. Ferrari drafted in their sports car drivers Olivier Gendebien and Phil Hill.
- Five-time World Champion Juan Manuel Fangio retired after the French race. The Argentine had earned so much respect that champion-to-be Mike Hawthorn braked on the final straight, so that Fangio could unlap himself and complete the full race distance. Fangio still holds the record for the highest percentage of races won, the highest percentage of pole positions and the highest percentage of fastest laps.
- Swedish driver Jo Bonnier had entered the season under his own name but moved to BRM for the final two races of the season. Nevertheless, Giulio Cabianca and Hans Herrmann finished the season for Bonnier's team.

== Calendar ==
Round	Grand Prix	Circuit	Date
1	Argentine Grand Prix	(Argentina) Autódromo Oscar Alfredo Gálvez, Buenos Aires	19 January
2	Monaco Grand Prix	Circuit de Monaco, Monte Carlo	18 May
3	Dutch Grand Prix	(Netherlands) Circuit Zandvoort, Zandvoort	26 May
4	Indianapolis 500	(United States) Indianapolis Motor Speedway, Speedway	30 May (Note: The Indianapolis 500 also counted towards the 1958 USAC Championship Car season, and was run for USAC Championship cars, but did not count towards the International Cup for F1 Manufacturers.)
5	Belgian Grand Prix	(Belgium) Circuit de Spa-Francorchamps, Stavelot	15 June
6	French Grand Prix	(France) Reims-Gueux, Gueux	6 July
7	British Grand Prix	(United Kingdom) Silverstone Circuit, Silverstone	19 July
8	German Grand Prix	(West Germany) Nürburgring, Nürburg	3 August
9	Portuguese Grand Prix	(Portugal) Circuito da Boavista, Porto	24 August
10	Italian Grand Prix	(Italy) Autodromo Nazionale di Monza, Monza	7 September
11	Moroccan Grand Prix	(Morocco) Ain-Diab Circuit, Casablanca	19 October

=== Calendar changes ===
- The Dutch and Belgian Grand Prix returned to the calendar after being cancelled in 1956 and 1957 due to the Suez Crisis. The Pescara Grand Prix was dropped from the calendar, as it had merely been a replacement for the cancelled rounds.
- The Portuguese and Moroccan Grand Prix hosted their first World Championship Grands Prix.
- After one year at Rouen-Les-Essarts, the French Grand Prix was moved back to Reims-Gueux.
- The British Grand Prix was moved from Aintree Motor Racing Circuit to Silverstone Circuit, in keeping with the event-sharing arrangement between the two circuits.

== Regulation changes ==
=== Sporting regulations ===
- The International Cup for F1 Manufacturers was awarded for the first time.
- Minimum race lengths were reduced to 300 kilometres (190 mi) or two hours (whichever came first).
- The practice of sharing cars during a race was discouraged by withholding championship points. (Example: Gregory and Shelby finished fourth in the Italian Grand Prix but were not awarded championship points.)

=== Technical regulations ===
- The use of commercial petrol became compulsory in place of specialised alcohol-based racing fuels.

== Championship report ==
=== Rounds 1 to 4 ===
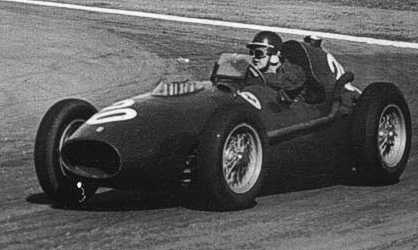
Mike Hawthorn (Ferrari) finished third in the Argentine Grand Prix.

Because the new regulations around fuel were drawn up late, many of the British teams were not ready in time for the season opener, the Argentine Grand Prix, and the race had just ten entrants, the lowest ever: three from Scuderia Ferrari, six private Maseratis and Stirling Moss in a Cooper from Rob Walker Racing, 1958 being the team's first full season. Five-time and reigning champion Juan Manuel Fangio qualified on pole position in one of the Maseratis he took over from the works team, ahead of the Ferraris of Mike Hawthorn and Peter Collins. At the start, Collins immediately broke a drive shaft. Hawthorn shot into the lead but was quickly repassed by Fangio. Around half distance, however, the Argentinian had to pit for fresh rear tyres. Moss took the lead and gambled on not needing a pit stop. The canvas was showing on both wheels, but he held on to win, just ahead of the Ferrari duo of Luigi Musso and Mike Hawthorn. Apart from being the first World Drivers' Championship race win for Cooper as a constructor it was also the first win for a rear-engined car, the first win for a car entered by a privateer team and the first win for a car powered by an engine built by another manufacturer.

A full four months later, the Monaco Grand Prix saw no less than 30 drivers trying to qualify for 16 places on the starting grid. The British teams were present and quick off the mark: Tony Brooks qualified on pole for Vanwall, ahead of Jean Behra for BRM and the Cooper duo of Jack Brabham and Roy Salvadori. The latter had the best start, arriving at the first corner in the lead, but he braked too late and bent his steering column. Behra and Brooks drew away but Hawthorn was the fastest man on track. He passed the Vanwall on lap 18, which retired shortly after with a loose spark plug, and took the lead on lap 27, when Behra's brakes seemed to fade. In the next phase, Stirling Moss, who was back at Vanwall, was fastest and briefly took the lead, before his engine started misfiring and he, too, retired. Veteran racer Maurice Trintignant, who had taken Moss' place at Rob Walker Racing, had started fifth but took advantage of his rivals' misfortune, including, on lap 46, that of Hawthorn, whose Ferrari had shaken its fuel pump loose. Trintignant completed the 100 laps to take victory, ahead of Musso and Collins. Rob Walker Racing had taken a second win in a row ahead of two Ferraris.

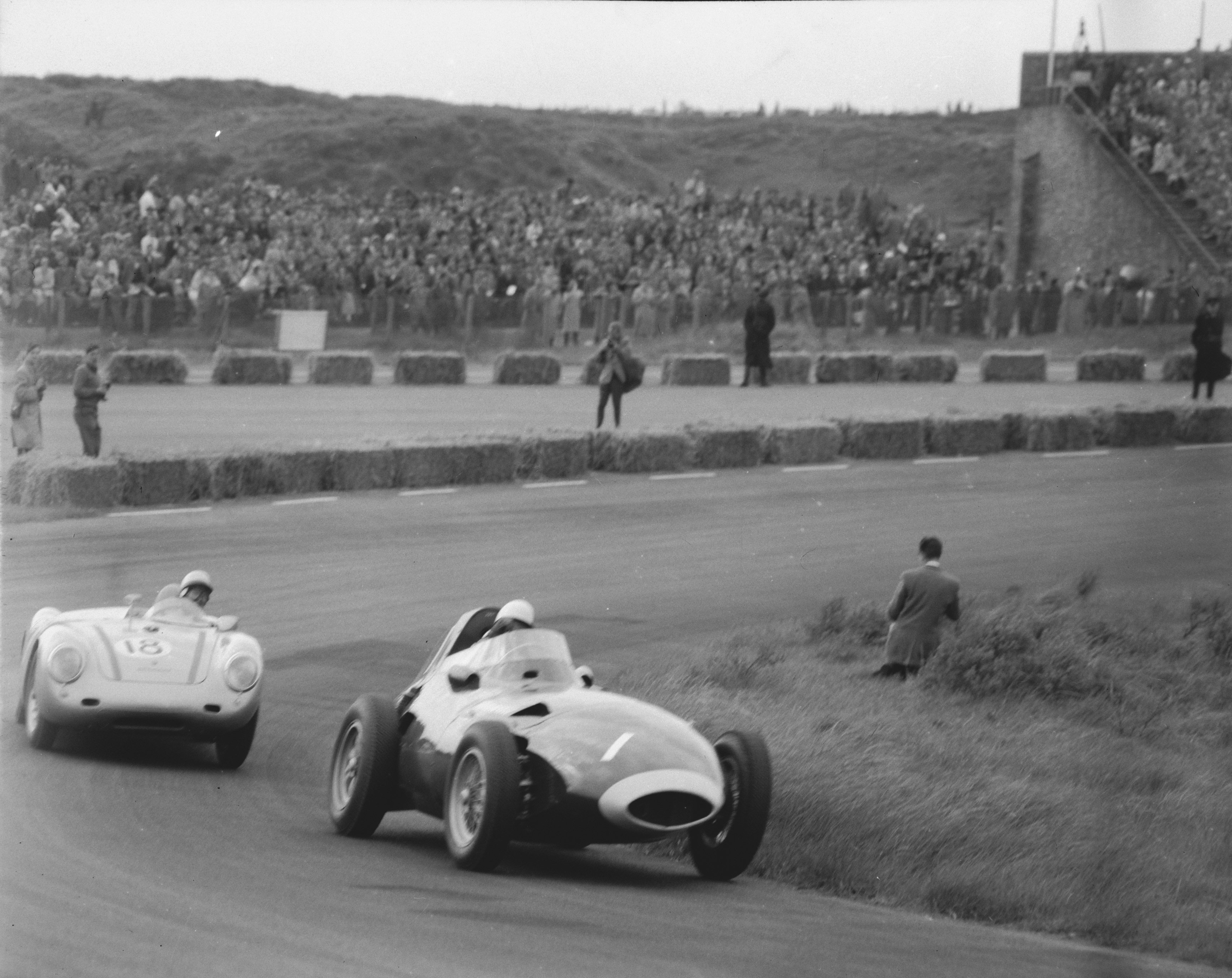
Stirling Moss for Vanwall (front) won the Dutch Grand Prix.

The front row for the Dutch Grand Prix was occupied by Vanwalls: Lewis-Evans, Moss and Brooks. Moss took the lead at the start, ahead of Lewis-Evans, while seventh-starting Harry Schell in the BRM got up to third and then took second place on lap 12. Moss kept out of trouble and took the win, while his teammates both retired. The BRM duo of Schell and Behra completed the podium, while Hawthorn was the first Ferrari in fifth place.

A couple of days later, the Indianapolis 500 was run. Fangio had skipped the Dutch GP and tried to race in the Indy 500 but failed to qualify. Pat O'Connor died in a first-lap pileup, while reigning USAC champion Jimmy Bryan won the race.

In the F1 Drivers' Championship, Stirling Moss (Vanwall) was leading with 17 points, ahead of Luigi Musso (Ferrari) and Maurice Trintignant (Cooper). The Manufacturers' Championship saw Cooper take the lead with 19 points, ahead of Ferrari (14) and Vanwall (8).

=== Rounds 5 to 8 ===
The Belgian Grand Prix had been given the honorary title of European Grand Prix and marked the first start by a female driver, Maria Teresa de Filippis. The high-speed nature of Spa-Francorchamps saw the three Ferraris start in the top five, with Mike Hawthorn and Luigi Musso at the top, but the quick-starting Vanwalls of Stirling Moss and Tony Brooks formed the leading duo after the first corner. Before the first lap was over, however, Moss made an erroneous gear change and destroyed his engine. Brooks took over the lead but was overtaken by Peter Collins. The lead changed hands a couple of times, before the Ferrari overheated and had to be retired. Brooks won the race, twenty seconds ahead of Hawthorn and three minutes ahead of teammate Lewis-Evans. Dramatically, all three cars broke down coming out of the last corners, but managed to coast over the finish line, so would the race have been one lap longer, the result would have been very different.

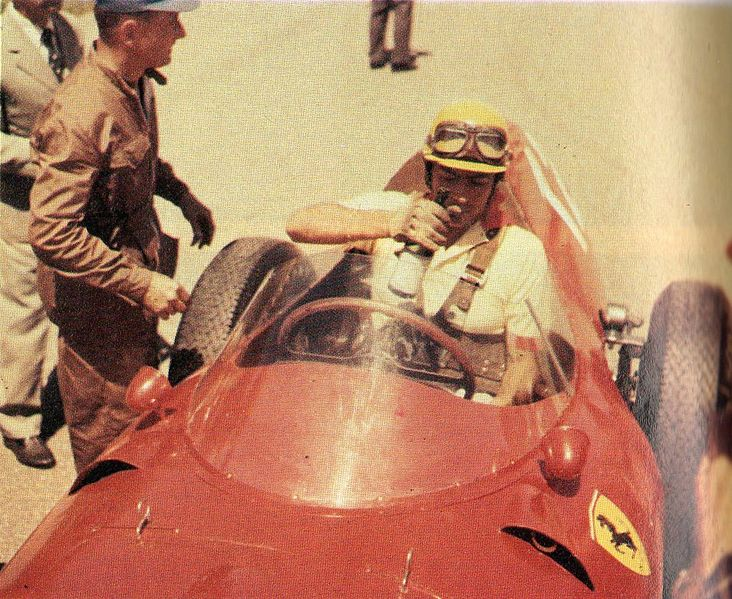
Ferrari driver Luigi Musso (pictured earlier in 1958) was fatally injured in the French Grand Prix.

Like in Belgium, Ferrari's Hawthorn and Musso qualified on top for the French Grand Prix, ahead of Harry Schell (BRM), who managed to take the lead at the start but fell back to seventh on lap 2. Hawthorn was the fastest man on track, while Musso tried hard to keep him in view, until on lap 10, the Italian pushed too hard and ran wide. His car struck a ditch and somersaulted. Musso was airlifted to hospital with critical head injuries and would pass away later that day. Hawthorn won the race, ahead of championship rival Moss and teammate Von Trips.

The British Grand Prix at Silverstone saw three different British teams on the front row: Moss for Vanwall, Schell for BRM and Salvadori for Cooper. But Ferrari drivers Collins and Hawthorn were lying first and third after the first lap. Moss held on to second place until, on lap 26, his engine blew up. Ferrari scored a 1–2, ahead of Salvadori achieving his first career podium. Five-time champion and reigning Juan Manuel Fangio retired after this race.

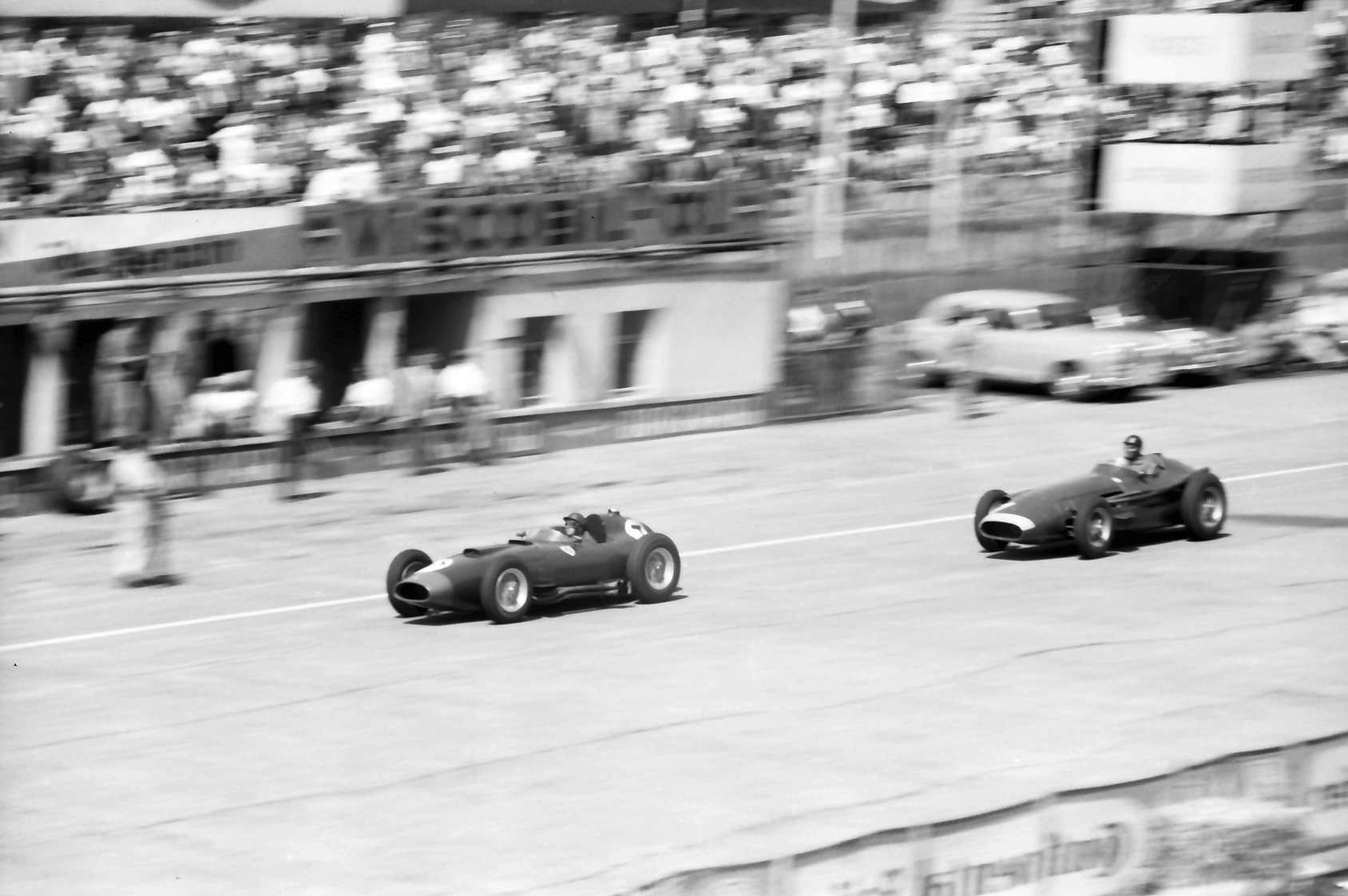
Ferrari driver Peter Collins was fatally injured in the German Grand Prix (picture from the 1957 German Grand Prix, Collins left).

Championship leader Hawthorn started on pole position for the German Grand Prix, ahead of Brooks and Moss. The latter snatched the lead and set multiple lap records in the early phase. He had a lead of 17 seconds over Collins and Hawthorn when his ignition failed and he coasted to a halt. The Ferrari duo seemed free to fight for the win, until Brooks caught up and used his Vanwall's agility to take the lead through the twisty sections. On lap 11, Collins went off the road, struck a ditch and flipped into the air. He was thrown out and struck a tree, suffering critical head injuries. He would pass away in hospital later that day. Hawthorn retired with clutch issues on the next lap, handing Brooks the win, with a lead of several minutes over the Coopers of Salvadori and Trintignant.

In the Drivers' Championship, Mike Hawthorn (Ferrari) was leading with 30 points, ahead of Stirling Moss (Vanwall) with 24 and Tony Brooks (Vanwall) with 16. In the Manufacturers' Championship, Ferrari was leading with 37, ahead of Vanwall (33) and Cooper (29).

=== Rounds 9 to 11 ===
The Portuguese Grand Prix was part of the championship for the first time and was run at the Circuito da Boavista, a street circuit in Porto. Championship protagonists Stirling Moss and Mike Hawthorn were separated by just 0.05 seconds in qualifying, with the Vanwall placed on pole position and teammate Stuart Lewis-Evans completing the front row. Rain before the start left the roads wet and gave Hawthorn the advantage to take the lead. Ferrari teammate Wolfgang von Trips got up to third, before being passed by Jean Behra in the BRM. The roads dried up and Moss retook the lead on lap 8. He subsequently managed to grow such a big lead that the spectators got bored and, just after half-distance, he lapped his teammate in fourth place. Hawthorn pitted to have his brakes tightened up. Behra passed him, but on lap 41, his engine lost power the Ferrari was back up to second. Lewis-Evans had stayed in Moss's slipstream and when Behra moved out of the way for the leader, his teammate could handily snatch third off of the BRM. They could have tried the same with Hawthorn, but Moss stayed behind his rival out of respect. Moss crossed the line to win the race and Lewis-Evans was flagged as third. Hawthorn had to finish the last lap to take second, but he spun and stalled his engine. Many people wanted to help push the Ferrari, but that would have resulted in disqualification, so Moss (already on his victory lap) waved the crowd away and Hawthorn managed to push start the car by himself. Before he could jump back in and take the wheel, however, the car had rolled a couple of yards in the wrong direction of the circuit, so the officials disqualified him after all. Moss again displayed his courtesy and defended his rival, although he would have taken the championship lead. No earlier than 11pm, the decision was reversed and Hawthorn's second place was reinstated.

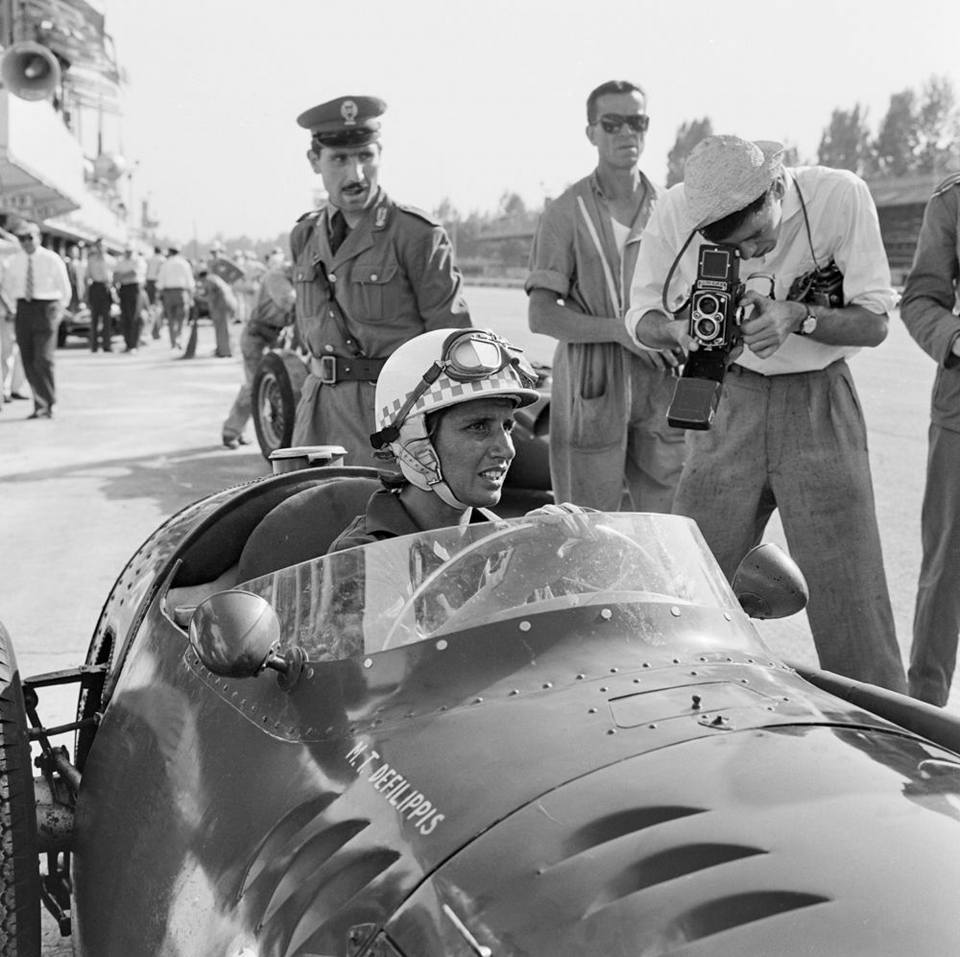
Maria Teresa de Filippis became the first female F1 driver to start and finish a Grand Prix in Belgium. She raced again in Monza (see picture) and Porto but retired on both occasions.

The local Ferrari team were seen as favourites for the Italian Grand Prix, not just by the tifosi, but Moss and Brooks placed their Vanwalls on the top of the grid. Hawthorn started in third but quickly lost out to Lewis-Evans in the third Vanwall. Von Trips hit the rear wheel of Harry Schell, flew into the air and was thrown out of the car before it struck a tree. The BRM somersaulted off the road and luckily landed on his wheels, because Schell was still in the cockpit. Von Trips suffered injury to his leg and would not race in the season finale. Meanwhile, the traditional slipstreaming began at the front and led to multiple lead changes. Future champion Phil Hill was running his first race for the Ferrari F1 team and was running comfortably among the leaders, until on lap 7, he had to pit for a wheel change. Moss retired on lap 17 with gearbox trouble and saw his championship rival take the lead of the race. With Lewis-Evans having retired and Brooks down in fifth after a pit stop, Ferrari looked secure to take a dominant victory. Brooks was the fastest man on track, however, and Hawthorn's clutch began to slip. Lap by lap, the Vanwall clawed his way up the order, and took the lead on lap 60. Hawthorn nursed his car to the finish line in second place, while Hill finished third.

Going into the season finale, the first-ever Moroccan Grand Prix, Moss (32 points) had a small chance to win the championship: he had to win the race, with Hawthorn (40 points) finishing third or lower without the fastest lap. In that scenario, the two would tie on points and Moss would win on count-back. Hawthorn started on pole but fell back to third at the start. Moss took the lead, ahead of Phil Hill. The American outbraked himself on lap 3, giving Moss the chance to fly away in front. At half-distance, he led Hill by 20 seconds and Hawthorn was fighting Brooks for third. In the next ten laps, three drivers crashed, all slightly injured, and Lewis-Evans slid off the road when his engine exploded. His car caught fire and the Brit suffered serious burns. Hawthorn was back in second, so Moss won the race comfortably but could not secure the championship. Lewis-Evans would succumb to his injuries six days after the race. Vanwall owner Tony Vandervell ended his involvement with the team, partly as a result of this but also in failing health himself, and Bernie Ecclestone sold his Connaught team and ceased involvement with the sport till 1965.

In the Drivers' Championship, Mike Hawthorn (Ferrari) collected 42 points and won the title, ahead of Stirling Moss (Vanwall) with 41 and Tony Brooks (Vanwall) with 24. In the Manufacturers' Championship, Vanwall won the title with 48 points, ahead of Ferrari (40) and Cooper (31). Until 1973, it would not happen again that different teams won the two championships in the same year.

== Results and standings ==
=== Grands Prix ===
Round	Grand Prix	Pole position	Fastest lap	Winning driver	Winning constructor	Tyre	Report
1	(Argentina) Argentine Grand Prix	(Argentina) Juan Manuel Fangio	(Argentina) Juan Manuel Fangio	(United Kingdom) Stirling Moss	(United Kingdom) Cooper-Climax	C	Report
2	Monaco Grand Prix	(United Kingdom) Tony Brooks	(United Kingdom) Mike Hawthorn	(France) Maurice Trintignant	(United Kingdom) Cooper-Climax	D	Report
3	(Netherlands) Dutch Grand Prix	(United Kingdom) Stuart Lewis-Evans	(United Kingdom) Stirling Moss	(United Kingdom) Stirling Moss	(United Kingdom) Vanwall	D	Report
4	(United States) Indianapolis 500	(United States) Dick Rathmann	(United States) Tony Bettenhausen	(United States) Jimmy Bryan	(United States) Salih-Offenhauser	F	Report
5	(Belgium) Belgian Grand Prix	(United Kingdom) Mike Hawthorn	(United Kingdom) Mike Hawthorn	(United Kingdom) Tony Brooks	(United Kingdom) Vanwall	D	Report
6	(France) French Grand Prix	(United Kingdom) Mike Hawthorn	(United Kingdom) Mike Hawthorn	(United Kingdom) Mike Hawthorn	(Italy) Ferrari	E	Report
7	(United Kingdom) British Grand Prix	(United Kingdom) Stirling Moss	(United Kingdom) Mike Hawthorn	(United Kingdom) Peter Collins	(Italy) Ferrari	E	Report
8	(West Germany) German Grand Prix	(United Kingdom) Mike Hawthorn	(United Kingdom) Stirling Moss	(United Kingdom) Tony Brooks	(United Kingdom) Vanwall	D	Report
9	(Portugal) Portuguese Grand Prix	(United Kingdom) Stirling Moss	(United Kingdom) Mike Hawthorn	(United Kingdom) Stirling Moss	(United Kingdom) Vanwall	D	Report
10	(Italy) Italian Grand Prix	(United Kingdom) Stirling Moss	(United States) Phil Hill	(United Kingdom) Tony Brooks	(United Kingdom) Vanwall	D	Report
11	(Morocco) Moroccan Grand Prix	(United Kingdom) Mike Hawthorn	(United Kingdom) Stirling Moss	(United Kingdom) Stirling Moss	(United Kingdom) Vanwall	D	Report

=== Scoring system ===
Points were awarded to the top five classified finishers, with an additional point awarded for setting the fastest lap, regardless of finishing position or even classification. Only the best six results counted towards the championship. Formula 2 cars were not eligible for Championship Points. No points were awarded for shared drives. If more than one driver set the same fastest lap time, the fastest lap point would be divided equally between the drivers.

The International Cup for F1 Manufacturers only counted the points of the highest-finishing driver for each race, although fastest lap points were not counted. Indy 500 results did not count towards the cup. Additionally, like the Drivers' Championship, only the best six results counted towards the cup.

Numbers without parentheses are championship points; numbers in parentheses are total points scored. Points were awarded in the following system:

Position	1st	2nd	3rd	4th	5th	FL
Race	8	6	4	3	2	1

=== World Drivers' Championship standings ===
Pos.	Driver	ARG (Argentina)	MON (Monaco)	NED (Netherlands)	500 (United States)	BEL (Belgium)	FRA (France)	GBR (United Kingdom)	GER (West Germany)	POR (Portugal)	ITA (Italy)	MOR (Morocco)	Pts.
1	(United Kingdom) Mike Hawthorn	(3)	(Ret^{F})	(5)		2^{P}^{F}	1^{P}^{F}	2^{F}	Ret^{P}	2^{F}	2	2^{P}	42 (49)
2	(United Kingdom) Stirling Moss	1	Ret	1^{F}		Ret	2	Ret^{P}	Ret^{F}	1^{P}	Ret^{P}	1^{F}	41
3	(United Kingdom) Tony Brooks		Ret^{P}	Ret		1	Ret† / Ret	7	1	Ret	1	Ret	24
4	(United Kingdom) Roy Salvadori		Ret	4		8	11	3	2	9	5	7	15
5	(United Kingdom) Peter Collins	Ret	3	Ret		Ret	5	1	Ret				14
=	(United States) Harry Schell	6	5	2		5	Ret	5	Ret	6	Ret	5	14
7	(France) Maurice Trintignant		1	9		7	Ret	8	3	8	Ret	Ret	12
=	(Italy) Luigi Musso	2	2	7		Ret	Ret						12
9	(United Kingdom) Stuart Lewis-Evans		Ret	Ret^{P}		3	Ret†	4		3	Ret	Ret	11
10	(United States) Phil Hill						7		9^{1}		3^{F}	3	9
=	(France) Jean Behra	5	Ret	3		Ret	Ret	Ret	Ret	4	Ret	Ret	9
=	(West Germany) Wolfgang von Trips		Ret				3	Ret	4	5	Ret		9
13	(United States) Jimmy Bryan				1								8
14	(Argentina) Juan Manuel Fangio	4^{P}^{F}			DNQ		4						7
15	(United States) George Amick				2								6
16	(United States) Johnny Boyd				3								4
=	(United States) Tony Bettenhausen				4^{F}								4
18	(Australia) Jack Brabham		4	8		Ret	6	6	Ret^{1}	7	Ret	11^{1}	3
=	(United Kingdom) Cliff Allison		6	6		4	Ret	Ret	10	Ret	7	10	3
=	(Sweden) Jo Bonnier		Ret	10		9	8	Ret	Ret	Ret	Ret	4	3
21	(United States) Jim Rathmann				5								2
—	(United States) Masten Gregory			Ret		Ret					4~	6	0
—	(United States) Carroll Shelby						Ret	9		Ret	4~ / Ret		0
—	(United Kingdom) Graham Hill		Ret	Ret		Ret	Ret	Ret	Ret^{1}	Ret	6	16	0
—	(Belgium) Olivier Gendebien					6					Ret	Ret	0
—	(United States) Jimmy Reece				6								0
—	(Argentina) Carlos Menditeguy	7											0
—	(United States) Don Freeland				7								0
—	(Spain) Paco Godia	8	DNQ			Ret	Ret						0
—	(United Kingdom) Jack Fairman							Ret				8	0
—	(United States) Jud Larson				8								0
—	(Italy) Gerino Gerini		DNQ				9	Ret			Ret	12	0
—	(West Germany) Hans Herrmann								Ret		Ret	9	0
—	(United Kingdom) Horace Gould	9	DNQ	DNS									0
—	(United States) Eddie Johnson				9								0
—	(Italy) Maria Teresa de Filippis		DNQ			10				Ret	Ret		0
—	(United States) Troy Ruttman				DNQ		10		DNS				0
—	(United States) Bill Cheesbourg				10								0
—	(Netherlands) Carel Godin de Beaufort			11					Ret^{1}				0
—	(United States) Al Keller				11								0
—	(United States) Johnnie Parsons				12								0
—	(United States) Johnnie Tolan				13								0
—	(United Kingdom) Ian Burgess							Ret	7^{1}				0
—	(United Kingdom) Ivor Bueb							Ret	11^{1}				0
—	(West Germany) Wolfgang Seidel					Ret			Ret^{1}			Ret	0
—	(Italy) Giorgio Scarlatti		Ret	Ret									0
—	(Italy) Giulio Cabianca		DNQ								Ret		0
—	(United Kingdom) Ron Flockhart		DNQ									Ret	0
—	(United States) Bob Christie				Ret								0
—	(United States) Dempsey Wilson				Ret								0
—	(United States) A. J. Foyt				Ret								0
—	(United States) Paul Russo				Ret								0
—	(United States) Shorty Templeman				Ret								0
—	(United States) Rodger Ward				Ret								0
—	(United States) Billy Garrett				Ret								0
—	(United States) Eddie Sachs				Ret								0
—	(United States) Johnny Thomson				Ret								0
—	(United States) Chuck Weyant				Ret								0
—	(United States) Jack Turner				Ret								0
—	(United States) Bob Veith				Ret								0
—	(United States) Dick Rathmann				Ret^{P}								0
—	(United States) Ed Elisian				Ret								0
—	(United States) Pat O'Connor				Ret								0
—	(United States) Paul Goldsmith				Ret								0
—	(United States) Jerry Unser				Ret								0
—	(United States) Len Sutton				Ret								0
—	(United States) Art Bisch				Ret								0
—	(United Kingdom) Alan Stacey							Ret					0
—	(United States) Mike Magill				DSQ								0
—	(Australia) Ken Kavanagh		DNQ			DNS							0
—	(United States) Bruce Kessler		DNQ										0
—	(United Kingdom) Paul Emery		DNQ										0
—	(Monaco) André Testut		DNQ										0
—	(Italy) Luigi Piotti		DNQ										0
—	(United Kingdom) Bernie Ecclestone		DNQ					DNP					0
—	(Italy) Luigi Taramazzo		DNQ										0
—	(Monaco) Louis Chiron		DNQ										0
Drivers ineligible for Formula One points because they drove with Formula Two cars
—	(New Zealand) Bruce McLaren								5			13	
—	(West Germany) Edgar Barth								6				
—	(United Kingdom) Tony Marsh								8				
—	(Morocco) Robert La Caze											14	
—	(France) André Guelfi											15	
—	(Belgium) Christian Goethals								Ret				
—	(United Kingdom) Dick Gibson								Ret				
—	(United Kingdom) Brian Naylor								Ret				
—	(France) François Picard											Ret	
—	(United Kingdom) Tom Bridger											Ret	
Pos.	Driver	ARG (Argentina)	MON (Monaco)	NED (Netherlands)	500 (United States)	BEL (Belgium)	FRA (France)	GBR (United Kingdom)	GER (West Germany)	POR (Portugal)	ITA (Italy)	MOR (Morocco)	Pts.

Key
Colour	Result
Gold	Winner
Silver	Second place
Bronze	Third place
Green	Other points position
Blue	Other classified position
Blue	Not classified, finished (NC)
Purple	Not classified, retired (Ret)
Red	Did not qualify (DNQ)
Black	Disqualified (DSQ)
White	Did not start (DNS)
White	Race cancelled (C)
Blank	Did not practice (DNP)
Blank	Excluded (EX)
Blank	Did not arrive (DNA)
Blank	Withdrawn (WD)
Blank	Did not enter (empty cell)
Annotation	Meaning
P	Pole position
F	Fastest lap

- ~ No points awarded for shared drive
- † Position shared between multiple drivers of the same car.
- ^{1} – Ineligible for Formula One points, because he drove with a Formula Two car.

=== International Cup for F1 Manufacturers standings ===
Pos.	Manufacturer	ARG (Argentina)	MON (Monaco)	NED (Netherlands)	BEL (Belgium)	FRA (France)	GBR (United Kingdom)	GER (West Germany)	POR (Portugal)	ITA (Italy)	MOR (Morocco)	Pts.
1	(United Kingdom) Vanwall		Ret	1	1	(2)	(4)	1	1	1	1	48 (57)
2	(Italy) Ferrari	2	2	(5)	2	1	1	(4)	2	(2)	(2)	40 (57)
3	(United Kingdom) Cooper-Climax	1	1	4	8	6	3	2	7	5	7	31
4	(United Kingdom) BRM		5	2	5	Ret	5	Ret	4	Ret	4	18
5	(Italy) Maserati	4	Ret	10	7	4	9	Ret	Ret	4†	6	6
6	(United Kingdom) Lotus-Climax		6	6	4	Ret	Ret	10	Ret	6	10	3
—	(West Germany) Porsche			11								0
—	(United Kingdom) Connaught-Alta		DNQ				Ret					0
—	(Italy) OSCA	WD	DNQ									0
Pos.	Manufacturer	ARG (Argentina)	MON (Monaco)	NED (Netherlands)	BEL (Belgium)	FRA (France)	GBR (United Kingdom)	GER (West Germany)	POR (Portugal)	ITA (Italy)	MOR (Morocco)	Pts.

- Bold results counted to championship totals.

† No points were awarded for a shared drive.

== Non-championship races ==
The following races were contested by Formula One cars but did not count towards the World Championship of Drivers or the International Cup for Formula One Manufacturers.

Race name	Circuit	Date	Winning driver	Constructor	Report
(United Kingdom) VI Glover Trophy	Goodwood	7 April	(United Kingdom) Mike Hawthorn	(Italy) Ferrari	Report
(Italy) VIII Gran Premio di Siracusa	Syracuse	13 April	(Italy) Luigi Musso	(Italy) Ferrari	Report
(United Kingdom) XIII BARC Aintree 200	Aintree	19 April	(United Kingdom) Stirling Moss	(United Kingdom) Cooper-Climax	Report
(United Kingdom) X BRDC International Trophy	Silverstone	3 May	(United Kingdom) Peter Collins	(Italy) Ferrari	Report
(France) VI Grand Prix de Caen	Caen	20 July	(United Kingdom) Stirling Moss	(United Kingdom) Cooper-Climax	Report
