= 1958 German Grand Prix =

← Previous race	Next race →
- Nürburgring layout

Race details
- Date: 3 August 1958
- Official name: XX Großer Preis von Deutschland
- Location: Nürburgring, Nürburg, West Germany
- Course: Permanent road course
- Course length: 22.810 km (14.173 miles)
- Distance: 15 laps, 342.150 km (212.595 miles)

Pole position
Driver	(United Kingdom) Mike Hawthorn	Ferrari
- Time: 9:14.0

Fastest lap
Driver	(United Kingdom) Stirling Moss	Vanwall
- Time: 9:09.2

Podium
First	(United Kingdom) Tony Brooks	Vanwall
Second	(United Kingdom) Roy Salvadori	Cooper-Climax
Third	(France) Maurice Trintignant	Cooper-Climax

The 1958 German Grand Prix was a Formula One race held on 3 August 1958 at Nürburgring. It was race 8 of 11 in the 1958 World Championship of Drivers and race 7 of 10 in the 1958 International Cup for Formula One Manufacturers.

To increase participation, the organizers opened the field to Formula 2 cars. Also, the race distance was shortened to 15 laps from 22 previously. The two races were run at the same time but the Formula 2 entries (shown in yellow) were not eligible for World Championship points and some sources do not consider these starts in career stats. Peter Collins died after an accident on the 11th lap, as rival Tony Brooks went on to victory. On lap 11 during the race while Collins was pushing his Ferrari to the limit chasing Tony Brooks' Vanwall in the Pflanzgarten section, Collins had a fatal accident as his Ferrari ran too wide, crashed into a ditch and went flying into the air. His car then somersaulted and he struck a tree head first. Although he was given medical treatment he died in hospital later that day. Brooks said in his biography that Collins drove harder than any other driver he had ever faced in his racing career. But others believed he had almost suffered the same incident as Luigi Musso did at the 1958 French Grand Prix earlier that season and that this race had the rivalry that was similar to the Collins and Fangio duel 2 years before.

== Classification ==
=== Qualifying ===
Pos	No	Driver	Constructor	Time	Gap
1	3	(United Kingdom) Mike Hawthorn	Ferrari	9:14.0	
2	8	(United Kingdom) Tony Brooks	Vanwall	9:15.0	+1.0
3	7	(United Kingdom) Stirling Moss	Vanwall	9:19.9	+5.9
4	2	(United Kingdom) Peter Collins	Ferrari	9:21.9	+7.9
5	4	(West Germany) Wolfgang von Trips	Ferrari	9:24.7	+10.7
6	10	(United Kingdom) Roy Salvadori	Cooper–Climax	9:35.3	+21.3
7	11	(France) Maurice Trintignant	Cooper–Climax	9:36.9	+22.9
8	6	(United States) Harry Schell	BRM	9:39.6	+25.6
9	16	(Sweden) Jo Bonnier	Maserati	9:42.7	+28.7
10	24	(Australia) Jack Brabham	Cooper–Climax	9:43.4	+29.4
11	12	(United Kingdom) Cliff Allison	Lotus–Climax	9:44.3	+30.3
12	5	(France) Jean Behra	BRM	9:46.8	+32.8
13	23	(United States) Phil Hill	Ferrari	9:48.9	+34.9
14	26	(United Kingdom) Ian Burgess	Cooper–Climax	9:55.3	+41.3
15	20	(New Zealand) Bruce McLaren	Cooper–Climax	9:56.0	+42.0
16	21	(West Germany) Edgar Barth	Porsche	9:57.2	+43.2
17	30	(United Kingdom) Tony Marsh	Cooper–Climax	9:57.5	+43.5
18	18	(Netherlands) Carel Godin de Beaufort	Porsche	10:01.5	+47.5
19	28	(United Kingdom) Ivor Bueb	Lotus–Climax	10:02.6	+48.6
20	17	(West Germany) Hans Herrmann	Maserati	10:13.5	+59.5
21	29	(United Kingdom) Brian Naylor	Cooper–Climax	10:17.9	+1:03.9
22	22	(West Germany) Wolfgang Seidel	Cooper–Climax	10:21.0	+1:07.0
23	19	(United Kingdom) Dick Gibson	Cooper–Climax	10:55.0	+1:41.0
24	27	(Belgium) Christian Goethals	Cooper–Climax	11:22.9	+2:08.9
25	25	(United Kingdom) Graham Hill	Lotus–Climax	18:56.0	+9:42.0
NC	14	(United States) Troy Ruttman	Maserati	No time	

=== Race ===
Pos	No	Driver	Constructor	Laps	Time/Retired	Grid	Points
1	8	(United Kingdom) Tony Brooks	Vanwall	15	2:21:15.0	2	8
2	10	(United Kingdom) Roy Salvadori	Cooper-Climax	15	+3:29.7	6	6
3	11	(France) Maurice Trintignant	Cooper-Climax	15	+5:11.2	7	4
4	4	(West Germany) Wolfgang von Trips	Ferrari	15	+6:16.3	5	3
5	20	(New Zealand) Bruce McLaren	Cooper-Climax	15	+6:26.3	12	
6	21	(West Germany) Edgar Barth	Porsche	15	+6:32.4	13	
7	26	(United Kingdom) Ian Burgess	Cooper-Climax	15	+6:59.3	11	
8	30	(United Kingdom) Tony Marsh	Cooper-Climax	15	+7:09.9	14	
9	23	(United States) Phil Hill	Ferrari	15	+7:45.5	10	
10	12	(United Kingdom) Cliff Allison	Lotus-Climax	13	+2 laps	24	0^{1}
11	28	(United Kingdom) Ivor Bueb	Lotus-Climax	13	+2 laps	16	
Ret	3	(United Kingdom) Mike Hawthorn	Ferrari	11	Clutch	1	
Ret	2	(United Kingdom) Peter Collins	Ferrari	10	Fatal accident	4	
Ret	22	(West Germany) Wolfgang Seidel	Cooper-Climax	9	Suspension	17	
Ret	6	(United States) Harry Schell	BRM	9	Brakes	8	
Ret	27	(Belgium) Christian Goethals	Cooper-Climax	4	Fuel pump	23	
Ret	25	(United Kingdom) Graham Hill	Lotus-Climax	4	Oil pipe	22	
Ret	5	(France) Jean Behra	BRM	4	Suspension	9	
Ret	18	(Netherlands) Carel Godin de Beaufort	Porsche	3	Engine	15	
Ret	17	(West Germany) Hans Herrmann	Maserati	3	Engine	20	
Ret	7	(United Kingdom) Stirling Moss	Vanwall	3	Magneto	3	1^{2}
Ret	19	(United Kingdom) Dick Gibson	Cooper-Climax	2	Engine	18	
Ret	29	(United Kingdom) Brian Naylor	Cooper-Climax	1	Fuel pump	25	
Ret	24	(Australia) Jack Brabham	Cooper-Climax	1	Collision	19	
Ret	16	(Sweden) Jo Bonnier	Maserati	1	Accident	21	
DNS	14	(United States) Troy Ruttman	Maserati		Engine		

Notes

- ^1 – Despite being the fifth-placed Formula One car, Allison scored no points because he finished tenth on the road behind five Formula Two cars
- ^2 – 1 point for fastest lap

== Championship standings after the race ==
Drivers' Championship standings

	Pos	Driver	Points
	1	(United Kingdom) Mike Hawthorn	30
	2	(United Kingdom) Stirling Moss	24
4	3	(United Kingdom) Tony Brooks	16
1	4	(United Kingdom) Peter Collins	14
4	5	(United Kingdom) Roy Salvadori	13

Constructors' Championship standings

Pos	Constructor	Points
1	(Italy) Ferrari	37 (39)
2	(United Kingdom) Vanwall	33
3	(United Kingdom) Cooper-Climax	29
4	(United Kingdom) BRM	12
5	(Italy) Maserati	6

- Notes: Only the top five positions are included for both sets of standings. Only the best six results counted towards each Championship. Numbers without parentheses are Championship points; numbers in parentheses are total points scored.

Previous race: 1958 British Grand Prix	FIA Formula One World Championship; 1958 season	Next race: 1958 Portuguese Grand Prix
Previous race: 1957 German Grand Prix	German Grand Prix	Next race: 1959 German Grand Prix
