= 1958 Italian Grand Prix =

| ← Previous race | Next race → |
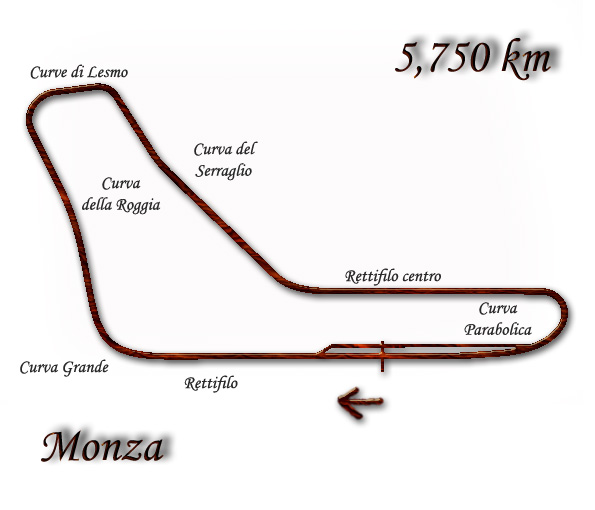
- Autodromo Nazionale di Monza layout

Race details
- Date: 7 September 1958
- Official name: XXIX Gran Premio d'Italia
- Location: Autodromo Nazionale di Monza, Monza, Italy
- Course: Permanent road course
- Course length: 5.750 km (3.573 miles)
- Distance: 70 laps, 404.5 km (250.1 miles)

Pole position
| Driver | (United Kingdom) Stirling Moss | Vanwall |
- Time: 1:40.5

Fastest lap
| Driver | (United States) Phil Hill | Ferrari |
- Time: 1:42.9

Podium
| First | (United Kingdom) Tony Brooks | Vanwall |
| Second | (United Kingdom) Mike Hawthorn | Ferrari |
| Third | (United States) Phil Hill | Ferrari |

The 1958 Italian Grand Prix was a Formula One motor race held at Monza on 7 September 1958. It was race 10 of 11 in the 1958 World Championship of Drivers and race 9 of 10 in the 1958 International Cup for Formula One Manufacturers. Vanwall won the first Constructors' Championship in the category with 1 race left to go. After retiring his original car, entered by Scuderia Centro Sud, Carroll Shelby took over Masten Gregory's car, entered by Temple Buell, and finished fourth. No points were awarded for the shared drive.

== Classification ==
=== Qualifying ===
| Pos | No | Driver | Constructor | Time | Gap |
|---|---|---|---|---|---|
| 1 | 26 | (United Kingdom) Stirling Moss | Vanwall | 1:40.5 | — |
| 2 | 28 | (United Kingdom) Tony Brooks | Vanwall | 1:41.2 | +0.7 |
| 3 | 14 | (United Kingdom) Mike Hawthorn | Ferrari | 1:41.8 | +1.3 |
| 4 | 30 | (United Kingdom) Stuart Lewis-Evans | Vanwall | 1:42.4 | +1.9 |
| 5 | 20 | (Belgium) Olivier Gendebien | Ferrari | 1:42.5 | +2.0 |
| 6 | 16 | (Germany) Wolfgang von Trips | Ferrari | 1:42.6 | +2.1 |
| 7 | 18 | (United States) Phil Hill | Ferrari | 1:42.7 | +2.2 |
| 8 | 8 | (France) Jean Behra | BRM | 1:43.2 | +2.7 |
| 9 | 10 | (United States) Harry Schell | BRM | 1:43.2 | +2.7 |
| 10 | 12 | (Sweden) Jo Bonnier | BRM | 1:44.7 | +4.2 |
| 11 | 32 | (United States) Masten Gregory | Maserati | 1:44.9 | +4.4 |
| 12 | 38 | (United Kingdom) Graham Hill | Lotus-Climax | 1:46.0 | +5.5 |
| 13 | 2 | (France) Maurice Trintignant | Cooper-Climax | 1:46.4 | +5.9 |
| 14 | 6 | (United Kingdom) Roy Salvadori | Cooper-Climax | 1:47.0 | +6.5 |
| 15 | 4 | (Australia) Jack Brabham | Cooper-Climax | 1:47.3 | +6.8 |
| 16 | 36 | (United Kingdom) Cliff Allison | Lotus-Climax | 1:47.8 | +7.3 |
| 17 | 34 | (United States) Carroll Shelby | Maserati | 1:48.0 | +7.5 |
| 18 | 24 | (Germany) Hans Herrmann | Maserati | 1:49.8 | +9.3 |
| 19 | 40 | (Italy) Gerino Gerini | Maserati | 1:50.1 | +9.6 |
| 20 | 22 | (Italy) Giulio Cabianca | Maserati | 1:54.6 | +14.1 |
| 21 | 42 | (Italy) Maria Teresa de Filippis | Maserati | 1:55.9 | +15.4 |

=== Race ===
| Pos | No | Driver | Constructor | Laps | Time/Retired | Grid | Points |
|---|---|---|---|---|---|---|---|
| 1 | 28 | (United Kingdom) Tony Brooks | Vanwall | 70 | 2:03:47.8 | 2 | 8 |
| 2 | 14 | (United Kingdom) Mike Hawthorn | Ferrari | 70 | + 24.2 | 3 | 6 |
| 3 | 18 | (United States) Phil Hill | Ferrari | 70 | + 28.3 | 7 | 5^{1} |
| 4 | 32 | (United States) Masten Gregory (United States) Carroll Shelby | Maserati | 69 | + 1 Lap | 11 | 0^{2} |
| 5 | 6 | (United Kingdom) Roy Salvadori | Cooper-Climax | 62 | + 8 Laps | 14 | 2 |
| 6 | 38 | (United Kingdom) Graham Hill | Lotus-Climax | 62 | + 8 Laps | 12 | |
| 7 | 36 | (United Kingdom) Cliff Allison | Lotus-Climax | 61 | + 9 Laps | 16 | |
| Ret | 42 | (Italy) Maria Teresa de Filippis | Maserati | 57 | Engine | 21 | |
| Ret | 22 | (Italy) Giulio Cabianca | Maserati | 51 | Engine | 20 | |
| Ret | 8 | (France) Jean Behra | BRM | 42 | Clutch | 8 | |
| Ret | 24 | (Germany) Hans Herrmann | Maserati | 32 | Engine | 18 | |
| Ret | 30 | (United Kingdom) Stuart Lewis-Evans | Vanwall | 30 | Overheating | 4 | |
| Ret | 2 | (France) Maurice Trintignant | Cooper-Climax | 24 | Gearbox | 13 | |
| Ret | 26 | (United Kingdom) Stirling Moss | Vanwall | 17 | Gearbox | 1 | |
| Ret | 12 | (Sweden) Jo Bonnier | BRM | 14 | Transmission | 10 | |
| Ret | 20 | (Belgium) Olivier Gendebien | Ferrari | 4 | Suspension | 5 | |
| Ret | 40 | (Italy) Gerino Gerini | Maserati | 2 | Accident | 19 | |
| Ret | 34 | (United States) Carroll Shelby | Maserati | 1 | Handling | 17 | |
| Ret | 16 | (Germany) Wolfgang von Trips | Ferrari | 0 | Accident | 6 | |
| Ret | 10 | (United States) Harry Schell | BRM | 0 | Accident | 9 | |
| Ret | 4 | (Australia) Jack Brabham | Cooper-Climax | 0 | Suspension | 15 | |

Notes

- ^1 – Includes 1 point for fastest lap
- ^2 – No points awarded for shared drive

== Championship standings after the race ==
Drivers' Championship standings

| | Pos | Driver | Points |
|---|---|---|---|
| | 1 | (United Kingdom) Mike Hawthorn | 40 (43) |
| | 2 | (United Kingdom) Stirling Moss | 32 |
| | 3 | (United Kingdom) Tony Brooks | 24 |
| 1 | 4 | (United Kingdom) Roy Salvadori | 15 |
| 1 | 5 | (United Kingdom) Peter Collins | 14 |

Constructors' Championship standings

| Pos | Constructor | Points |
|---|---|---|
| 1 | (United Kingdom) Vanwall | 46 (49) |
| 2 | (Italy) Ferrari | 40 (51) |
| 3 | (United Kingdom) Cooper-Climax | 31 |
| 4 | (United Kingdom) BRM | 15 |
| 5 | (Italy) Maserati | 6 |

- Notes: Only the top five positions are included for both sets of standings. Only the best 6 results counted towards each Championship. Numbers without parentheses are Championship points; numbers in parentheses are total points scored.

| Previous race: 1958 Portuguese Grand Prix | FIA Formula One World Championship; 1958 season | Next race: 1958 Moroccan Grand Prix |
| Previous race: 1957 Italian Grand Prix | Italian Grand Prix | Next race: 1959 Italian Grand Prix |
