= 1958 British Grand Prix =

← Previous race	Next race →
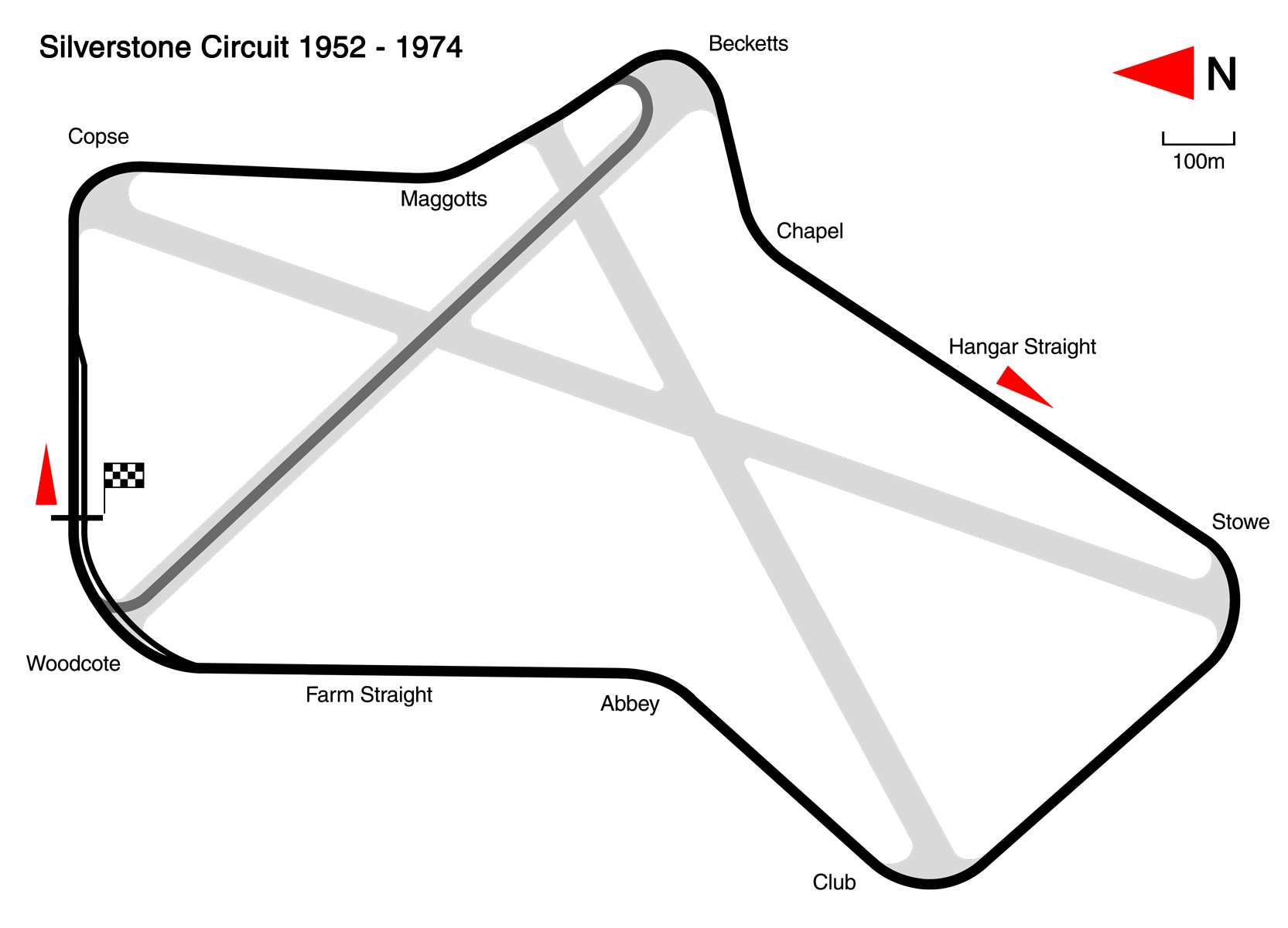
- Silverstone Circuit in 1952-1973 configuration

Race details
- Date: 19 July 1958
- Official name: 11th RAC British Grand Prix
- Location: Silverstone Circuit; Silverstone, England
- Course: Permanent racing facility
- Course length: 4.7105 km (2.927 miles)
- Distance: 75 laps, 353.288 km (219.525 miles)

Pole position
Driver	(United Kingdom) Stirling Moss	Vanwall
- Time: 1:39.4

Fastest lap
Driver	(United Kingdom) Mike Hawthorn	Ferrari
- Time: 1:40.8

Podium
First	(United Kingdom) Peter Collins	Ferrari
Second	(United Kingdom) Mike Hawthorn	Ferrari
Third	(United Kingdom) Roy Salvadori	Cooper-Climax

The 1958 British Grand Prix was a Formula One race held on 19 July 1958 at Silverstone. It was race 7 of 11 in the 1958 World Championship of Drivers and race 6 of 10 in the 1958 International Cup for Formula One Manufacturers.

== Entries ==
Bernie Ecclestone entered a pair of Connaughts for Ivor Bueb and Jack Fairman, with Ecclestone also named as a driver of the Fairman car in case he needed to take over the entry.

== Classification ==
=== Qualifying ===
Pos	No	Driver	Constructor	Time	Gap
1	7	(United Kingdom) Stirling Moss	Vanwall	1:39.4	—
2	20	(United States) Harry Schell	BRM	1:39.8	+0.4
3	10	(United Kingdom) Roy Salvadori	Cooper-Climax	1:40.0	+0.6
4	2	(United Kingdom) Mike Hawthorn	Ferrari	1:40.4	+1.0
5	17	(United Kingdom) Cliff Allison	Lotus-Climax	1:40.4	+1.0
6	1	(United Kingdom) Peter Collins	Ferrari	1:40.6	+1.2
7	9	(United Kingdom) Stuart Lewis-Evans	Vanwall	1:41.4	+2.0
8	19	(France) Jean Behra	BRM	1:41.4	+2.0
9	8	(United Kingdom) Tony Brooks	Vanwall	1:41.6	+2.2
10	11	(Australia) Jack Brabham	Cooper-Climax	1:42.0	+2.6
11	3	(Germany) Wolfgang von Trips	Ferrari	1:42.0	+2.6
12	4	(France) Maurice Trintignant	Cooper-Climax	1:42.6	+3.2
13	22	(Sweden) Jo Bonnier	Maserati	1:43.0	+3.6
14	16	(United Kingdom) Graham Hill	Lotus-Climax	1:43.0	+3.6
15	5	(United States) Carroll Shelby	Maserati	1:44.2	+4.8
16	12	(United Kingdom) Ian Burgess	Cooper-Climax	1:45.4	+6.0
17	15	(United Kingdom) Ivor Bueb	Connaught-Alta	1:51.4	+12.0
18	6	(Italy) Gerino Gerini	Maserati	1:53.0	+13.6
19	14	(United Kingdom) Jack Fairman	Connaught-Alta	1:58.8	+19.4
20	18	(United Kingdom) Alan Stacey	Lotus-Climax	1:58.8	+19.4

=== Race ===
Pos	No	Driver	Constructor	Laps	Time/Retired	Grid	Points
1	1	(United Kingdom) Peter Collins	Ferrari	75	2:09:04.2	6	8
2	2	(United Kingdom) Mike Hawthorn	Ferrari	75	+24.2	4	7^{1}
3	10	(United Kingdom) Roy Salvadori	Cooper-Climax	75	+50.6	3	4
4	9	(United Kingdom) Stuart Lewis-Evans	Vanwall	75	+50.8	7	3
5	20	(United States) Harry Schell	BRM	75	+1:14.8	2	2
6	11	(Australia) Jack Brabham	Cooper-Climax	75	+1:23.2	10	
7	8	(United Kingdom) Tony Brooks	Vanwall	74	+1 Lap	9	
8	4	(France) Maurice Trintignant	Cooper-Climax	73	+2 Laps	12	
9	5	(United States) Carroll Shelby	Maserati	72	+3 Laps	15	
Ret	3	(Germany) Wolfgang von Trips	Ferrari	59	Engine	11	
Ret	22	(Sweden) Jo Bonnier	Maserati	49	Gearbox	13	
Ret	6	(Italy) Gerino Gerini	Maserati	44	Gearbox	18	
Ret	12	(United Kingdom) Ian Burgess	Cooper-Climax	40	Clutch	16	
Ret	7	(United Kingdom) Stirling Moss	Vanwall	25	Engine	1	
Ret	17	(United Kingdom) Cliff Allison	Lotus-Climax	21	Engine	5	
Ret	19	(France) Jean Behra	BRM	19	Suspension	8	
Ret	15	(United Kingdom) Ivor Bueb	Connaught-Alta	19	Gearbox	17	
Ret	18	(United Kingdom) Alan Stacey	Lotus-Climax	19	Overheating	20	
Ret	16	(United Kingdom) Graham Hill	Lotus-Climax	17	Overheating	14	
Ret	14	(United Kingdom) Jack Fairman	Connaught-Alta	7	Ignition	19	

Notes

- ^1 – Includes 1 point for fastest lap

== Championship standings after the race ==
Drivers' Championship standings

	Pos	Driver	Points
1	1	(United Kingdom) Mike Hawthorn	30
1	2	(United Kingdom) Stirling Moss	23
8	3	(United Kingdom) Peter Collins	14
1	4	(Italy) Luigi Musso	12
1	5	(United States) Harry Schell	12

Constructors' Championship standings

Pos	Constructor	Points
1	(Italy) Ferrari	36
2	(United Kingdom) Vanwall	25
3	(United Kingdom) Cooper-Climax	23
4	(United Kingdom) BRM	12
5	(Italy) Maserati	6

- Notes: Only the top five positions are included for both sets of standings.

Previous race: 1958 French Grand Prix	FIA Formula One World Championship; 1958 season	Next race: 1958 German Grand Prix
Previous race: 1957 British Grand Prix	British Grand Prix	Next race: 1959 British Grand Prix
