= 1958 Portuguese Grand Prix =

← Previous race	Next race →

Race details
- Date: 24 August 1958
- Official name: VII Portuguese Grand Prix
- Location: Circuito da Boavista; Oporto (Porto), Portugal
- Course: Public road
- Course length: 7.4 km (4.625 miles)
- Distance: 50 laps, 370 km (231.25 miles)

Pole position
Driver	(United Kingdom) Stirling Moss	Vanwall
- Time: 2:34.21

Fastest lap
Driver	(United Kingdom) Mike Hawthorn	Ferrari
- Time: 2:32.37 on lap 36

Podium
First	(United Kingdom) Stirling Moss	Vanwall
Second	(United Kingdom) Mike Hawthorn	Ferrari
Third	(United Kingdom) Stuart Lewis-Evans	Vanwall

The 1958 Portuguese Grand Prix was a Formula One motor race held at Circuito da Boavista, Oporto on 24 August 1958. It was race 9 of 11 in the 1958 World Championship of Drivers and race 8 of 10 in the 1958 International Cup for Formula One Manufacturers.

Mike Hawthorn was initially disqualified for restarting his car against the direction of the circuit, losing seven points. However, Championship rival Stirling Moss had seen the incident which caused the disqualification and went to the judges to revert the decision since he felt Hawthorn had done nothing wrong. Eventually, Hawthorn was classified and retained his seven points. This was the most recent occurrence of an all-English podium in the sport until the 2026 Barcelona-Catalunya Grand Prix, 68 years later.

== Classification ==
=== Qualifying ===
Pos	No	Driver	Constructor	Time	Gap
1	2	(United Kingdom) Stirling Moss	Vanwall	2:34.2	—
2	24	(United Kingdom) Mike Hawthorn	Ferrari	2:34.2	+0.0
3	6	(United Kingdom) Stuart Lewis-Evans	Vanwall	2:34.6	+0.4
4	8	(France) Jean Behra	BRM	2:34.9	+0.7
5	4	(United Kingdom) Tony Brooks	Vanwall	2:35.9	+1.7
6	22	(Germany) Wolfgang von Trips	Ferrari	2:37.0	+2.8
7	10	(United States) Harry Schell	BRM	2:37.0	+2.8
8	14	(Australia) Jack Brabham	Cooper-Climax	2:37.4	+3.2
9	12	(France) Maurice Trintignant	Cooper-Climax	2:37.9	+3.7
10	28	(United States) Carroll Shelby	Maserati	2:40.4	+6.2
11	16	(United Kingdom) Roy Salvadori	Cooper-Climax	2:43.0	+8.8
12	20	(United Kingdom) Graham Hill	Lotus-Climax	2:46.2	+12.0
13	18	(United Kingdom) Cliff Allison	Maserati	2:46.2	+12.0
14	32	(Sweden) Jo Bonnier	Maserati	2:46.6	+12.4
15	30	(Italy) Maria Teresa de Filippis	Maserati	3:01.9	+27.7

=== Race ===
Pos	No	Driver	Constructor	Laps	Time/Retired	Grid	Points
1	2	(United Kingdom) Stirling Moss	Vanwall	50	2:11:27.80	1	8
2	24	(United Kingdom) Mike Hawthorn	Ferrari	50	+ 5:12.75	2	7^{1}
3	6	(United Kingdom) Stuart Lewis-Evans	Vanwall	49	+ 1 lap	3	4
4	8	(France) Jean Behra	BRM	49	+ 1 lap	4	3
5	22	(Germany) Wolfgang von Trips	Ferrari	49	+ 1 lap	6	2
6	10	(United States) Harry Schell	BRM	49	+ 1 lap	7	
7	14	(Australia) Jack Brabham	Cooper-Climax	48	+ 2 laps	8	
8	12	(France) Maurice Trintignant	Cooper-Climax	48	+ 2 laps	9	
9	16	(United Kingdom) Roy Salvadori	Cooper-Climax	46	+ 4 laps	11	
Ret	28	(United States) Carroll Shelby	Maserati	47	Brakes	10	
Ret	4	(United Kingdom) Tony Brooks	Vanwall	37	Spun off	5	
Ret	20	(United Kingdom) Graham Hill	Lotus-Climax	25	Spun off	12	
Ret	18	(United Kingdom) Cliff Allison	Maserati	15	Engine	13	
Ret	32	(Sweden) Jo Bonnier	Maserati	9	Physical	14	
Ret	30	(Italy) Maria Teresa de Filippis	Maserati	6	Engine	15	
DNA	26	(United States) Phil Hill	Ferrari				
DNA	34	(Portugal) Casimiro de Oliveira	Maserati				

Notes

- ^1 – Includes 1 point for fastest lap

== Championship standings after the race ==
Drivers' Championship standings

Pos	Driver	Points
1	(United Kingdom) Mike Hawthorn	36 (37)
2	(United Kingdom) Stirling Moss	32
3	(United Kingdom) Tony Brooks	16
4	(United Kingdom) Peter Collins	14
5	(United Kingdom) Roy Salvadori	13

Constructors' Championship standings

	Pos	Constructor	Points
1	1	(United Kingdom) Vanwall	41
1	2	(Italy) Ferrari	40 (45)
	3	(United Kingdom) Cooper-Climax	29
	4	(United Kingdom) BRM	15
	5	(Italy) Maserati	6

- Notes: Only the top five positions are included for both sets of standings. Only the best 6 results counted towards each Championship. Numbers without parentheses are Championship points; numbers in parentheses are total points scored.

Previous race: 1958 German Grand Prix	FIA Formula One World Championship; 1958 season	Next race: 1958 Italian Grand Prix
Previous race: 1957 Portuguese Grand Prix	Portuguese Grand Prix	Next race: 1959 Portuguese Grand Prix
