= 1958 Dutch Grand Prix =

← Previous race	Next race →
- Zandvoort original layout

Race details
- Date: May 26, 1958
- Official name: VI Grote Prijs van Nederland
- Location: Circuit Park Zandvoort; Zandvoort, Netherlands
- Course: Permanent racing facility
- Course length: 4.193 km (2.605 miles)
- Distance: 75 laps, 314.475 km (195.406 miles)

Pole position
Driver	(United Kingdom) Stuart Lewis-Evans	Vanwall
- Time: 1.37.1

Fastest lap
Driver	(United Kingdom) Stirling Moss	Vanwall
- Time: 1.37.6

Podium
First	(United Kingdom) Stirling Moss	Vanwall
Second	(United States) Harry Schell	BRM
Third	(France) Jean Behra	BRM

The 1958 Dutch Grand Prix was a Formula One motor race held on 26 May 1958 at Zandvoort. It was race 3 of 11 in the 1958 World Championship of Drivers and race 3 of 10 in the 1958 International Cup for Formula One Manufacturers.

== Classification ==
=== Qualifying ===
Pos	No	Driver	Constructor	Time	Gap
1	3	(United Kingdom) Stuart Lewis-Evans	Vanwall	1:37.1	
2	1	(United Kingdom) Stirling Moss	Vanwall	1:38.0	+0.9
3	2	(United Kingdom) Tony Brooks	Vanwall	1:38.1	+1.0
4	14	(France) Jean Behra	BRM	1:38.4	+1.3
5	8	(Australia) Jack Brabham	Cooper–Climax	1:38.5	+1.4
6	5	(United Kingdom) Mike Hawthorn	Ferrari	1:39.1	+2.0
7	15	(United States) Harry Schell	BRM	1:39.2	+2.1
8	9	(France) Maurice Trintignant	Cooper–Climax	1:39.2	+2.1
9	7	(United Kingdom) Roy Salvadori	Cooper–Climax	1:39.2	+2.1
10	4	(United Kingdom) Peter Collins	Ferrari	1:39.3	+2.2
11	17	(United Kingdom) Cliff Allison	Lotus–Climax	1:39.4	+2.3
12	6	(Italy) Luigi Musso	Ferrari	1:39.5	+2.4
13	16	(United Kingdom) Graham Hill	Lotus–Climax	1:39.8	+2.7
14	12	(United States) Masten Gregory	Maserati	1:42.0	+4.9
15	11	(Sweden) Jo Bonnier	Maserati	1:42.3	+5.2
16	10	(Italy) Giorgio Scarlatti	Maserati	1:44.6	+7.5
17	18	(Netherlands) Carel Godin de Beaufort	Porsche	1:46.7	+9.6

=== Race ===
Pos	No	Driver	Constructor	Laps	Time/Retired	Grid	Points
1	1	(United Kingdom) Stirling Moss	Vanwall	75	2:04:49.2	2	9^{1}
2	15	(United States) Harry Schell	BRM	75	+47.9 secs	7	6
3	14	(France) Jean Behra	BRM	75	+1:42.3	4	4
4	7	(United Kingdom) Roy Salvadori	Cooper-Climax	74	+1 Lap	9	3
5	5	(United Kingdom) Mike Hawthorn	Ferrari	74	+1 Lap	6	2
6	17	(United Kingdom) Cliff Allison	Lotus-Climax	73	+2 Laps	11	
7	6	(Italy) Luigi Musso	Ferrari	73	+2 Laps	12	
8	8	(Australia) Jack Brabham	Cooper-Climax	73	+2 Laps	5	
9	9	(France) Maurice Trintignant	Cooper-Climax	72	+3 Laps	8	
10	11	(Sweden) Jo Bonnier	Maserati	71	+4 Laps	15	
11	18	(Netherlands) Carel Godin de Beaufort	Porsche	69	+6 Laps	17	
Ret	10	(Italy) Giorgio Scarlatti	Maserati	52	Halfshaft	16	
Ret	3	(United Kingdom) Stuart Lewis-Evans	Vanwall	46	Engine	1	
Ret	16	(United Kingdom) Graham Hill	Lotus-Climax	40	Overheating	13	
Ret	4	(United Kingdom) Peter Collins	Ferrari	32	Gearbox	10	
Ret	12	(United States) Masten Gregory	Maserati	16	Fuel Pump	14	
Ret	2	(United Kingdom) Tony Brooks	Vanwall	13	Halfshaft	3	
DNS	12	(United Kingdom) Horace Gould	Maserati		Gregory drove car		

Notes

- ^1 – Includes 1 point for fastest lap

== Notes ==
- This was the first and second podium for BRM as both a manufacturer and as an engine supplier.

== Championship standings after the race ==
Drivers' Championship standings

	Pos	Driver	Points
1	1	(United Kingdom) Stirling Moss	17
1	2	(Italy) Luigi Musso	12
	3	(France) Maurice Trintignant	8
4	4	(United States) Harry Schell	8
1	5	(United Kingdom) Mike Hawthorn	7

Constructors' Championship standings

	Pos	Constructor	Points
	1	(United Kingdom) Cooper-Climax	19
	2	(Italy) Ferrari	14
2	3	(United Kingdom) Vanwall	8
	4	(United Kingdom) BRM	8
2	5	(Italy) Maserati	3

- Note: Only the top five positions are included for both sets of standings.

Previous race: 1958 Monaco Grand Prix	FIA Formula One World Championship; 1958 season	Next race: 1958 Indianapolis 500
Previous race: 1955 Dutch Grand Prix	Dutch Grand Prix	Next race: 1959 Dutch Grand Prix
