= 1958 Belgian Grand Prix =

← Previous race	Next race →
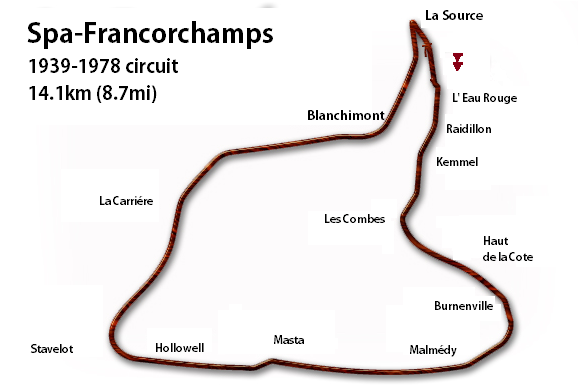

Race details
- Date: 15 June 1958
- Official name: XIX Grand Prix de Belgique
- Location: Spa-Francorchamps, Francorchamps, Belgium
- Course: Grand Prix Circuit
- Course length: 14.100 km (8.763 miles)
- Distance: 24 laps, 338.400 km (210.316 miles)
- Weather: Hot, dry

Pole position
Driver	(United Kingdom) Mike Hawthorn	Ferrari
- Time: 3:57.1

Fastest lap
Driver	(United Kingdom) Mike Hawthorn	Ferrari
- Time: 3:58.3

Podium
First	(United Kingdom) Tony Brooks	Vanwall
Second	(United Kingdom) Mike Hawthorn	Ferrari
Third	(United Kingdom) Stuart Lewis-Evans	Vanwall

The 1958 Belgian Grand Prix was a Formula One motor race held on 15 June 1958 at Spa-Francorchamps. It was race 5 of 11 in the 1958 World Championship of Drivers and race 4 of 10 in the 1958 International Cup for Formula One Manufacturers. The race was the 19th Belgian Grand Prix and it was held over 24 laps of the 14 kilometre circuit for a race distance of 339 kilometres.

== Summary ==
The Belgian Grand Prix returned to the calendar after being off the calendar the previous year, and the 8.7 mile Spa circuit had been slightly modified. The pits had been rebuilt, the pit straight had been widened and straightened and the entire track had been resurfaced. The race distance had been shortened from 36 to 24 laps.

The race was won by British driver Tony Brooks in a Vanwall. It was Brooks first solo Grand Prix victory after his car won the 1957 British Grand Prix in a shared drive with Stirling Moss. Brooks finished 20 seconds ahead of fellow Briton Mike Hawthorn driving a Ferrari 246 F1. Brooks' Vanwall teammate Stuart Lewis-Evans finished third in a career-best finish, the first of just two podium finishes to his short Grand Prix career. The race also marked the first World Championship race start (and finish) by a woman in the form of Maria Teresa de Filippis, who had entered the Monaco Grand Prix earlier in the year but failed to qualify. She finished tenth in her privately-entered Maserati 250F, two laps behind Brooks' Vanwall.

On the last lap, Brooks came out of La Source to end the race, and his gearbox seized as he crossed the line. When Mike Hawthorn was coming out of the same corner to end his race in second, his engine failed as he was coming to the finish line. Stuart Lewis-Evans's suspension collapsed on the way into La Source, and he crawled to the line in third. This race also marked the first points finish for Lotus when Cliff Allison came across the line in fourth.

== Classification ==
=== Qualifying ===
Pos	No	Driver	Constructor	Time	Gap
1	16	(United Kingdom) Mike Hawthorn	Ferrari	3:57.1	
2	18	(Italy) Luigi Musso	Ferrari	3:57.5	+0.4
3	2	(United Kingdom) Stirling Moss	Vanwall	3:57.6	+0.5
4	14	(United Kingdom) Peter Collins	Ferrari	3:57.7	+0.6
5	4	(United Kingdom) Tony Brooks	Vanwall	3:59.1	+2.0
6	20	(Belgium) Olivier Gendebien	Ferrari	3:59.3	+2.2
7	10	(United States) Harry Schell	BRM	4:04.5	+7.4
8	22	(Australia) Jack Brabham	Cooper–Climax	4:05.1	+8.0
9	30	(United States) Masten Gregory	Maserati	4:05.4	+8.3
10	8	(France) Jean Behra	BRM	4:06.2	+9.1
11	6	(United Kingdom) Stuart Lewis-Evans	Vanwall	4:07.2	+10.1
12	40	(United Kingdom) Cliff Allison	Lotus–Climax	4:07.7	+10.6
13	24	(United Kingdom) Roy Salvadori	Cooper–Climax	4:15.6	+18.5
14	36	(Sweden) Jo Bonnier	Maserati	4:15.7	+18.6
15	42	(United Kingdom) Graham Hill	Lotus–Climax	4:17.9	+20.8
16	28	(France) Maurice Trintignant	Maserati	4:21.7	+24.6
17	32	(West Germany) Wolfgang Seidel	Maserati	4:21.9	+24.8
18	38	(Spain) Paco Godia	Maserati	4:25.4	+28.3
19	26	(Italy) Maria Teresa de Filippis	Maserati	4:31.0	+33.9
20	34	(Australia) Ken Kavanagh	Maserati	4:45.3	+48.2

=== Race ===
Pos	No	Driver	Constructor	Laps	Time/Retired	Grid	Points
1	4	(United Kingdom) Tony Brooks	Vanwall	24	1:37:06.3	5	8
2	16	(United Kingdom) Mike Hawthorn	Ferrari	24	+20.7 secs	1	7^{1}
3	6	(United Kingdom) Stuart Lewis-Evans	Vanwall	24	+3:00.9	11	4
4	40	(United Kingdom) Cliff Allison	Lotus-Climax	24	+4:15.5	12	3
5	10	(United States) Harry Schell	BRM	23	+1 Lap	7	2
6	20	(Belgium) Olivier Gendebien	Ferrari	23	+1 Lap	6	
7	28	(France) Maurice Trintignant	Maserati	23	+1 Lap	16	
8	24	(United Kingdom) Roy Salvadori	Cooper-Climax	23	+1 Lap	13	
9	36	(Sweden) Jo Bonnier	Maserati	22	+2 Laps	14	
10	26	(Italy) Maria Teresa de Filippis	Maserati	22	+2 Laps	19	
Ret	38	(Spain) Paco Godia	Maserati	22	Engine	18	
Ret	22	(Australia) Jack Brabham	Cooper-Climax	16	Overheating	8	
Ret	42	(United Kingdom) Graham Hill	Lotus-Climax	12	Engine	15	
Ret	18	(Italy) Luigi Musso	Ferrari	5	Accident	2	
Ret	14	(United Kingdom) Peter Collins	Ferrari	5	Overheating	4	
Ret	8	(France) Jean Behra	BRM	5	Oil Pressure	10	
Ret	32	(Germany) Wolfgang Seidel	Maserati	4	Halfshaft	17	
Ret	2	(United Kingdom) Stirling Moss	Vanwall	0	Engine	3	
Ret	30	(United States) Masten Gregory	Maserati	0	Engine	9	
DNS	34	(Australia) Ken Kavanagh	Maserati		Engine		

Notes

- ^1 – Includes 1 point for fastest lap

== Championship standings after the race ==
Drivers' Championship standings

	Pos	Driver	Points
	1	(United Kingdom) Stirling Moss	17
4	2	(United Kingdom) Mike Hawthorn	14
1	3	(Italy) Luigi Musso	12
1	4	(United States) Harry Schell	10
2	5	(France) Maurice Trintignant	8

Constructors' Championship standings

	Pos	Constructor	Points
1	1	(Italy) Ferrari	20
1	2	(United Kingdom) Cooper-Climax	19
	3	(United Kingdom) Vanwall	16
	4	(United Kingdom) BRM	10
1	5	(United Kingdom) Lotus-Climax	3

- Notes: Only the top five positions are included for both sets of standings.

Previous race: 1958 Indianapolis 500	FIA Formula One World Championship; 1958 season	Next race: 1958 French Grand Prix
Previous race: 1956 Belgian Grand Prix	Belgian Grand Prix	Next race: 1960 Belgian Grand Prix
Previous race: 1957 British Grand Prix	European Grand Prix (Designated European Grand Prix)	Next race: 1959 French Grand Prix
