= 1957 Moroccan Grand Prix =

- Non-championship race in the 1957 Formula One season

Race details
- Date: 27 October 1957
- Official name: VI Grand Prix de Maroc
- Location: Ain-Diab Circuit, Casablanca
- Course: Public roads with permanent infrastructure
- Course length: 7.651 km (4.754 miles)
- Distance: 55 laps, 420.79 km (261.47 miles)

Pole position
Driver	(United Kingdom) Tony Brooks	Vanwall
- Time: 2:23.3

Fastest lap
Driver	(Argentina) Juan Manuel Fangio	Maserati
- Time: 2:25.6

Podium
First	(France) Jean Behra	Maserati
Second	(United Kingdom) Stuart Lewis-Evans	Vanwall
Third	(France) Maurice Trintignant	BRM

The 1957 Moroccan Grand Prix (officially named the VI Grand Prix de Maroc) was a non-championship Formula One motor race held in 1957, with no points going towards the World Championship. It was held over 55 laps of the 7.651 km Ain-Diab Circuit on 27 October 1957.

This race was won by French driver Jean Behra in a Maserati 250F winning by 30.1 seconds, from British driver Stuart Lewis-Evans in a Vanwall VW5 in second place, and another French driver Maurice Trintignant finishing third in a BRM P25.

The race coincided with an outbreak of Asian flu amongst the Grand Prix community which explains the absence of Stirling Moss and the lacklustre performance of Fangio.

== Classification ==
=== Grid ===
Pos.	No.	Driver	Constructor	Time
1	22	(United Kingdom) Tony Brooks	Vanwall	2:23.3
2	8	(France) Jean Behra	Maserati	2:23.5
3	24	(United Kingdom) Stuart Lewis-Evans	Vanwall	2:26.2
4	2	(United Kingdom) Peter Collins	Ferrari	2:27.2
5	6	(Argentina) Juan Manuel Fangio	Maserati	2:27.3
6	4	(United Kingdom) Mike Hawthorn	Ferrari	2:29.0
7	10	(United States) Harry Schell	Maserati	2:29.1
8	26	(France) Maurice Trintignant	BRM	2:29.1
9	18	(Australia) Jack Brabham	Cooper	2:29.4
10	28	(United Kingdom) Ron Flockhart	BRM	2:30.1
11	14	(Spain) Chico Godia	Maserati	2:32.0
12	16	(United Kingdom) Roy Salvadori	Cooper	2:32.8
13	12	(Italy) Giorgio Scarlatti	Maserati	2:36.1
14	30	(France) Jean Lucas	Maserati	2:38.1

=== Race ===
Pos.	No.	Driver	Constructor	Laps	Time/Ret.	Grid
1	8	(France) Jean Behra	Maserati	55	2:18:23.0	2
2	24	(United Kingdom) Stuart Lewis-Evans	Vanwall	55	2:18:53.1	3
3	26	(France) Maurice Trintignant	BRM	55	2:19:49.4	8
4	6	(Argentina) Juan Manuel Fangio	Maserati	55	2:20:23.8	5
5	10	(United States) Harry Schell	Maserati	54	+1 lap	7
6	14	(Spain) Chico Godia	Maserati	54	+1 lap	11
7	12	(Italy) Giorgio Scarlatti	Maserati	52	+3 laps	13
DNF	30	(France) Jean Lucas	Maserati	50	accident	14
DNF	28	(United Kingdom) Ron Flockhart	BRM	25	throttle	10
DNF	2	(United Kingdom) Peter Collins	Ferrari	16	accident	4
DNF	16	(United Kingdom) Roy Salvadori	Cooper	14	axle	12
DNF	22	(United Kingdom) Tony Brooks	Vanwall	12	electrics	1
DNF	4	(United Kingdom) Mike Hawthorn	Ferrari	8	illness	6
DSQ	18	(Australia) Jack Brabham	Cooper	8	oil	9

Previous race: 1957 Modena Grand Prix	Formula One non-championship races 1957 season	Next race: 1958 Glover Trophy
Previous race: 1956 Moroccan Grand Prix	Moroccan Grand Prix	Next race: 1958 Moroccan Grand Prix
