= Moroccan Grand Prix =

Automobile race

- Anfa Circuit (1930–1934); Agadir Circuit (1954–1956); Ain-Diab Circuit (1957–1958)
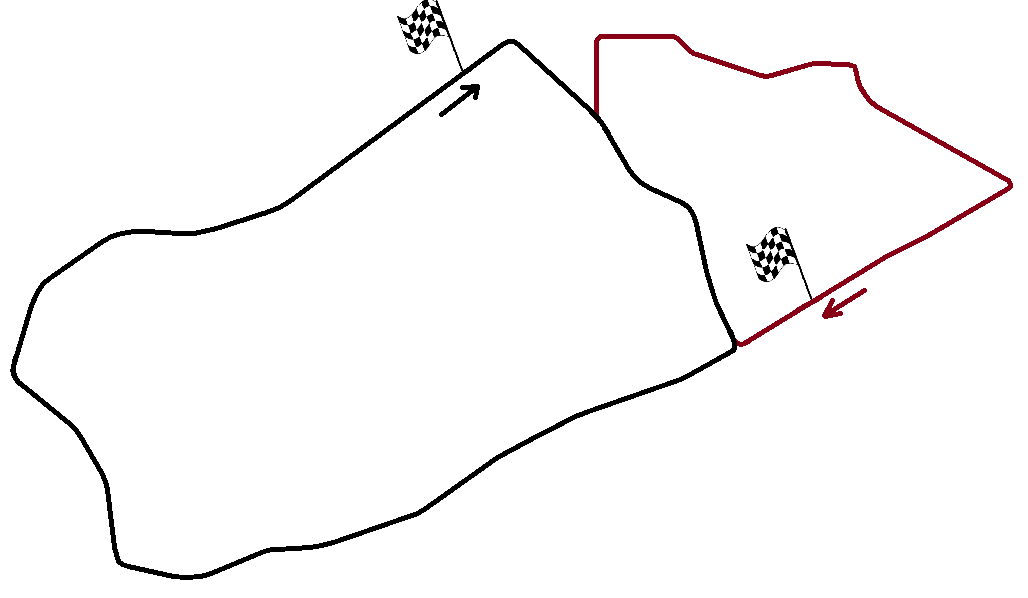

Race information
- Number of times held: 13
- First held: 1925
- Last held: 1958
- Most wins (drivers): No repeat winners
- Most wins (constructors): (France) Bugatti (4)

Last race (1958)

Pole position
- (United Kingdom) Mike Hawthorn; Ferrari; 2:23.1

Podium
- 1. (United Kingdom) Stirling Moss; Vanwall; 2:09:15.1; 2. (United Kingdom) Mike Hawthorn; Ferrari; +1:24.7; 3. (United States) Phil Hill; Ferrari; +1:25.5

Fastest lap
- (United Kingdom) Stirling Moss; Vanwall; 2:22.5

The Moroccan Grand Prix (Arabic: سباق الجائزة الكبرى المغربي) was a Grand Prix first organised in 1925 in Casablanca, Morocco with the official denomination of "Casablanca Grand Prix".

== History ==
In 1930, the race was held at the new Anfa Circuit (official denomination "Anfa Grand Prix"). It claimed the life of French driver Count Bruno d'Harcourt during a practice run.

There was no race in 1933 nor between 1935 and 1953. When it returned in 1954, it was held on a circuit at the city of Agadir for sports cars, and French dominance was interrupted by an Italian driver, Giuseppe Farina.

A new layout at Ain-Diab near Casablanca was made ready for the 1957 Formula One race which, although not counting toward the World Championship, attracted a world-class field. The race was won by Jean Behra for Maserati. The 1958 edition of the race was the only one to be part of the Formula One World Championship, and would be the final round of that season. The Championship battle was still alive between Mike Hawthorn of Ferrari and Stirling Moss of Vanwall. Hawthorn would finish second place to clinch the crown, despite his rival Moss winning the race. Vanwall would also clinch the inaugural Constructors Championship, but it was overshadowed by a crash involving Stuart Lewis-Evans, who died from his injuries six days later.

== Winners ==
=== By year ===
A pink background indicates an event which was not part of the Formula One World Championship.

Year	Driver	Constructor	Category	Location	Report
1925	(France) Comte de Vaugelas	Delage	Touring cars	Casablanca	Report
1926	(France) R. Meyerl	Bugatti	Touring cars	Casablanca	Report
1927	(France) G. Roll	Georges Irat	Touring cars	Casablanca	Report
1928	(France) E. Meyer	Bugatti	Touring cars	Casablanca	Report
1929	Not held				
1930	(Morocco) Charles Bénitah	Amilcar	Touring cars	Anfa	Report
1931	(Poland) Stanisław Czaykowski	Bugatti	Touring cars	Anfa	Report
1932	(France) Marcel Lehoux	Bugatti	Touring cars	Anfa	Report
1933	Not held				
1934	(Monaco) Louis Chiron	Alfa Romeo	Touring cars	Anfa	Report
1935 – 1953	Not held				
1954	(Italy) Giuseppe Farina	Ferrari	Sports cars	Agadir	Report
1955	(France) Mike Sparken	Ferrari	Sports cars	Agadir	Report
1956	(France) Maurice Trintignant	Ferrari	Sports cars	Agadir	Report
1957	(France) Jean Behra	Maserati	Formula One	Ain-Diab	Report
1958	(United Kingdom) Stirling Moss	Vanwall	Formula One	Ain-Diab	Report

=== Repeat winners (constructors) ===
A pink background indicates an event which was not part of the Formula One World Championship.

Wins	Constructor	Years won
4	(France) Bugatti	1926, 1928, 1931, 1932
3	(Italy) Ferrari	1954, 1955, 1956

=== Repeat winners (engine manufacturers) ===
A pink background indicates an event which was not part of the Formula One World Championship.

Wins	Manufacturer	Years won
4	(France) Bugatti	1926, 1928, 1931, 1932
3	(Italy) Ferrari	1954, 1955, 1956
