= 1931 Grand Prix season =

First year of the AIACR European Championship

1931 AIACR European Championship

Seasons
- ← none 1932 →

1931 Grand Prix season

Seasons
- ← 1930 1932 →

The 1931 Grand Prix season was a watershed year, with the advent of the AIACR European Championship. After several years of Grand Prix racing in the doldrums with little technical development, 1931 saw new models come from all three main manufacturers: Bugatti, Maserati and Alfa Romeo.

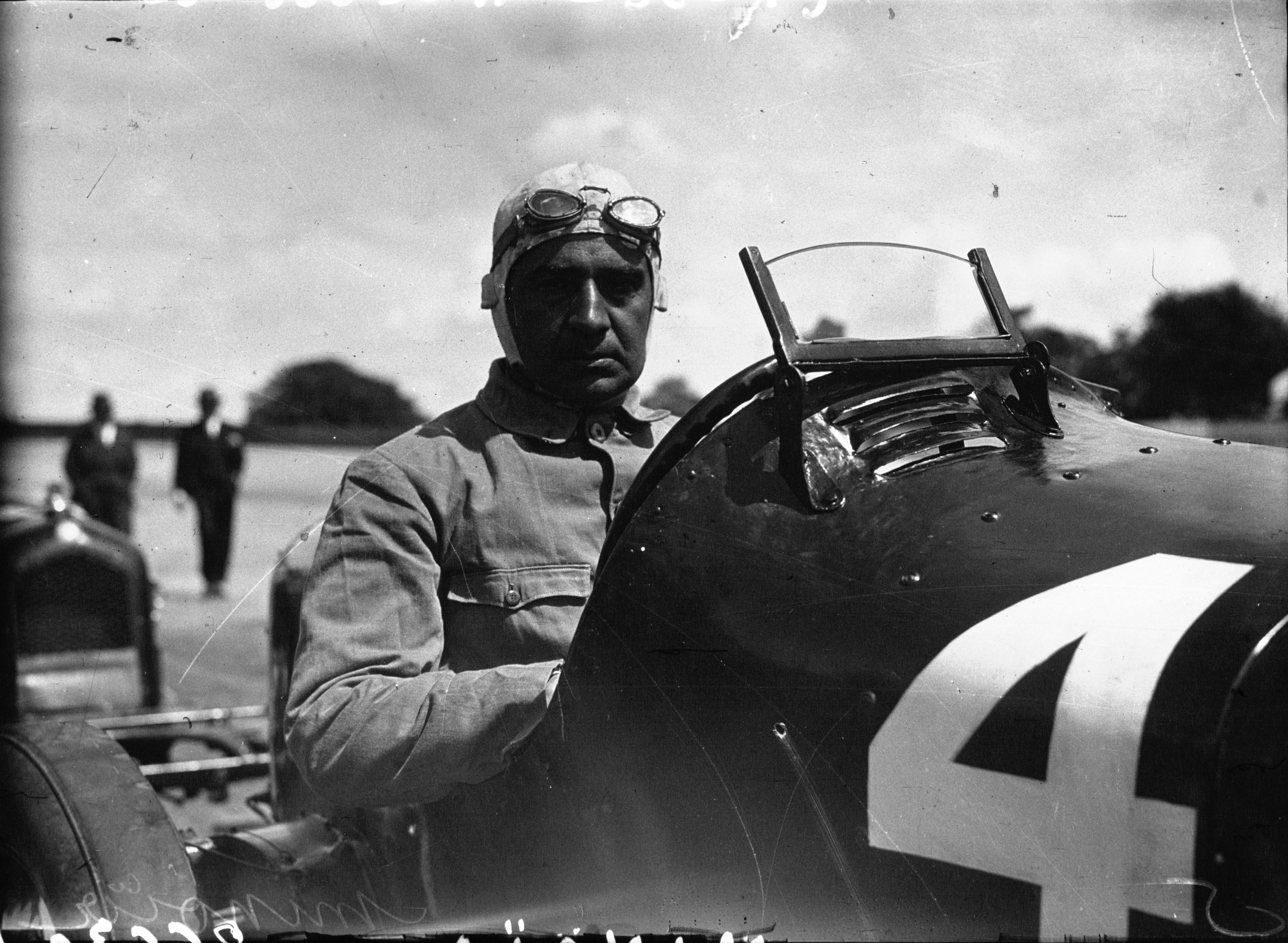
Ferdinando Minoia, inaugural European Champion

The AIACR regulations were to Formula Libre (open formula) rules for the cars, but the race-format chosen was to run the Grands Prix over a marathon ten hours each with two drivers per car. The pair had to be the same for all three races otherwise only the lead driver would score points. The championship was won by Ferdinando Minoia, driving for the Alfa Corse works team. He was tied on points with his team-mate Giuseppe Campari after the three races. Despite not having won any of the races, his consistency gave him the tiebreaker by covering a greater distance across the combined 30 hours of racing. However, the endurance format of the series was exhausting and unpopular with the drivers, and became processional and boring for the spectators and would not be repeated.

In the other major races of the season, the new Bugatti Type 51 won its first event, at Tunis, and dominated the French circuits in the early half of the season. The Italian Championship regularly drew the best drivers and gave close racing between Alfa Romeo, Bugatti and Maserati. At the end of the season, the championship was awarded to Alfa Romeo driver Campari, on a tie-breaker countback. With both major titles in their cabinet, Alfa Romeo finished the season strongly.

== European Championship Grands Prix ==
	Date	Name	Circuit	Race Regulations	Weather	Race Distance	Winner's Time	Winning driver	Winning constructor	Fastest lap	Report
A	24 May	(Italy) IX Italian Grand Prix; VII European Grand Prix	Monza A-circuit	AIACR	very hot	1550 km (winner)	10 hours	(Italy) Giuseppe Campari	Alfa Romeo 8C 2300	Giuseppe Campari; Alfa Romeo	Report
A	24 May	(Italy) IX Italian Grand Prix; VII European Grand Prix	Monza A-circuit	AIACR	very hot	1550 km (winner)	10 hours	(Italy) Tazio Nuvolari	Alfa Romeo 8C 2300	Giuseppe Campari; Alfa Romeo	Report
B	21 Jun	(France) XXV Grand Prix de l’ACF	Montlhéry	AIACR	hot	1259 km (winner)	10 hours	(Monaco) Louis Chiron	Bugatti Type 51	Luigi Fagioli; Maserati	Report
B	21 Jun	(France) XXV Grand Prix de l’ACF	Montlhéry	AIACR	hot	1259 km (winner)	10 hours	(Italy) Achille Varzi	Bugatti Type 51	Luigi Fagioli; Maserati	Report
C	12 Jul	(Belgium) III Belgian Grand Prix	Spa-Francorchamps	AIACR	sunny	1320 km (winner)	10 hours	(United Kingdom) William Grover-Williams ("W. Williams")	Bugatti Type 51	Louis Chiron; Bugatti	Report
C	12 Jul	(Belgium) III Belgian Grand Prix	Spa-Francorchamps	AIACR	sunny	1320 km (winner)	10 hours	(Italy) Caberto Conelli	Bugatti Type 51	Louis Chiron; Bugatti	Report

=== Other Grand Épreuves ===
	Date	Name	Circuit	Race Regulations	Weather	Race Distance	Winner's Time	Winning driver	Winning constructor	Fastest lap	Report
	30 May	(United States) XIX International 500 Mile; Sweepstakes	Indianapolis	AAA	cloudy	500 miles	5h 10m	(United States) Louis Schneider	Stevens-Miller	not recorded	Report
7	19 Jul	(Germany) V Großer Preis von Deutschland	Nürburgring	Formula Libre; Voiturette	heavy rain	502 km	4h 38m	(Germany) Rudolf Caracciola	Mercedes-Benz SSKL	Achille Varzi; Bugatti	Report
	22 Aug	(United Kingdom) British Grand Prix	Brooklands					not held			
	11 Sep	(Spain) Spanish Grand Prix	Lasarte					cancelled			

A grey background indicates the race was not held this year. Sources:

== Major Races ==
Multiple classes are mentioned when they were divided and run to different race lengths.

	Date	Name	Circuit	Race Regulations	Weather	Race Distance	Winner's Time	Winning driver	Winning constructor	Report
	22 Feb	(Sweden) Sveriges Vinter Grand Prix	Lake Rämen	Formula Libre	cloudy then sunny	385 km	5h 29m	(Finland) Karl Ebb	Auburn Special	Report
	15 Mar	(Italy) Gran Premio di Tripoli	Tagiura					cancelled		
	23 Mar	(Australia) IV Australian Grand Prix	Phillip Island	2000cc maximum engine capacity	Fine & mild	200 miles	2h 55m	(Australia) Carl Junker	Bugatti Type 39	Report
1	29 Mar	(French protectorate of Tunisia) III Grand Prix de Tunisie	Carthage	Formula Libre; Voiturette	sunny	470 km	3h 24m	(Italy) Achille Varzi	Bugatti Type 51	Report
	6 Apr	(France) II Circuit d'Ésterel Plage	L’Éstrel beach, Saint-Raphaël	Formula Libre; Voiturette	?	66 km	48m	(France) Philippe Étancelin	Bugatti Type 35C	Report
	6 Apr	(Hungary) Hungarian Grand Prix						cancelled		
2	19 Apr	III Grand Prix de Monaco	Monte Carlo	Formula Libre	sunny	320 km* (315 km)	3h 39m	(Monaco) Louis Chiron	Bugatti Type 51	Report
3	26 Apr	(Italy) VIII Circuito di Alessandria (Gran Premio Bordino)	Alessandria	Formula Libre	cloudy	280 km	2h 06m	(Italy) Achille Varzi	Bugatti Type 51	Report
4	10 May	(Italy) XXII Targa Florio	Grande Madonie	Targa Florio	heavy rain	580 km	9h 00m	(Italy) Tazio Nuvolari	Alfa Romeo 8C 2300	Report
	10 May	(France) VII Grand Prix de Picardie	Péronne	Formula Libre; Voiturette	?	210 km (winner)	2 hours	(France) "Ivernel"	Bugatti Type 35B	Report
	17 May	(French protectorate in Morocco) I Casablanca Grand Prix; V Moroccan Grand Prix	Anfa Circuit	Formula Libre; Voiturette	sunny	370 km	2h 42m	(Poland) Count Stanisław Czaykowski (France)	Bugatti Type 51	Report
	24 May	(Belgium) VI Grand Prix des Frontières	Chimay	Formula Libre; Voiturette	rain then cloudy	160 km	1h 26m	(Belgium) Arthur Legat	Bugatti Type 37A	Report
5	7 Jun	(Italy) VII Premio Reale di Roma	Littorio	Formula Libre, heats	?	240 km	1h 35m	(Italy) Ernesto Maserati	Maserati Tipo V4	Report
	7 Jun	(Switzerland) I Grand Prix de Genève	Meyrin	Formula Libre, heats Voiturette	sunny	250 km	1h 26m	(French Algeria) Marcel Lehoux	Bugatti Type 51	Report
	7 Jun	(Germany) V Eifelrennen	Südschleife, Nürburgring	Formula Libre	cloudy, then showers	310 km	2h 51m	(Germany) Rudolf Caracciola	Mercedes-Benz SSKL	Report
	7 Jun	(Poland) II Grand Prix Miasta Lwowa (Großer Preis von Lemberg)	Lviv	Formula Libre	rain	150 km	1h 57m	(Germany) Hans Stuck	Mercedes-Benz SSK	Report
	14 Jun	(Austria) Vienna Grand Prix						cancelled		
6	5 Jul	(France) VII Grand Prix de la Marne	Reims-Gueux	Formula Libre; Voiturette	sunny	400 km	2h 48m	(French Algeria) Marcel Lehoux	Bugatti Type 51	Report
	5 Jul	(France) Grand Prix du Vaucluse	Circuit de Réalpanier; Avignon	Formula Libre; Voiturette	?	100 km	55m	(France) Frédéric Toselli	Bugatti Type 37A	Report
	26 Jul	(France) III Dieppe Grand Prix	Dieppe	Formula Libre; Voiturette	windy then rain	480 km	4 hours	(France) Philippe Étancelin	Alfa Romeo 8C 2300	Report
8	2 Aug	(Italy) V Coppa Ciano	Montenero	Formula Libre; Voiturette	hot	200 km	2h 24m	(Italy) Tazio Nuvolari	Alfa Romeo	Report
	2 Aug	(Germany) I Internationales Avus-rennen	AVUS	Formula Libre; Voiturette	hot	300 km	1h 35m	(Germany) Rudolf Caracciola	Mercedes-Benz SSKL	Report
	2 Aug	(France) II Circuit du Dauphiné	Grenoble	Formula Libre; Voiturette	?	240 km	2h 02m	(France) Philippe Étancelin	Alfa Romeo 8C 2300	Report
9	16 Aug	(Italy) VII Coppa Acerbo	Pescara	Formula Libre; Voiturette	hot	300 km	2h 20m	(Italy) Giuseppe Campari	Alfa Romeo Tipo A	Report
	16 Aug	(France) VII Grand Prix du Comminges	Saint-Gaudens	Formula Libre; Voiturette	sunny	400 km	2h 49m	(France) Philippe Étancelin	Alfa Romeo 8C 2300	Report
10	6 Sep	(Italy) IV Gran Premio di Monza	Monza C-circuit	Formula Libre, heats	sunny	240 km	1h 33m	(Italy) Luigi Fagioli	Maserati 8C-2800	Report
	6 Sep	(Italy) VII Gran Premio delle Vetturette	Monza C-circuit	Voiturette	sunny	140 km	1h 01m	(Belgium) / (France) José Scaron	Amilcar MCO	Report
	13 Sep	(France) VII Grand Prix de la Baule	La Baule beach	Formula Libre	sunny	150 km	1h 03m	(United Kingdom) William Grover-Williams	Bugatti Type 51	Report
	19 Sep	(Italy) V Circuito di Cremona	Cremona					cancelled		
11	27 Sep	(Czechoslovakia) II Masaryk Circuit	Masaryk-Ring, Brno	Formula Libre; Voiturette	cold	500 km	4h 12m	(Monaco) Louis Chiron	Bugatti Type 51	Report
	27 Sep	(France) Grand Prix de Brignoles	Brignoles	Formula Libre	sunny	44 km	1h 03m	(United Kingdom) William Grover-Williams	Bugatti Type 51	Report

Note: *Race mistakenly flagged by officials after only 99 laps, not the full 100 as scheduled

== Regulations and Technical ==
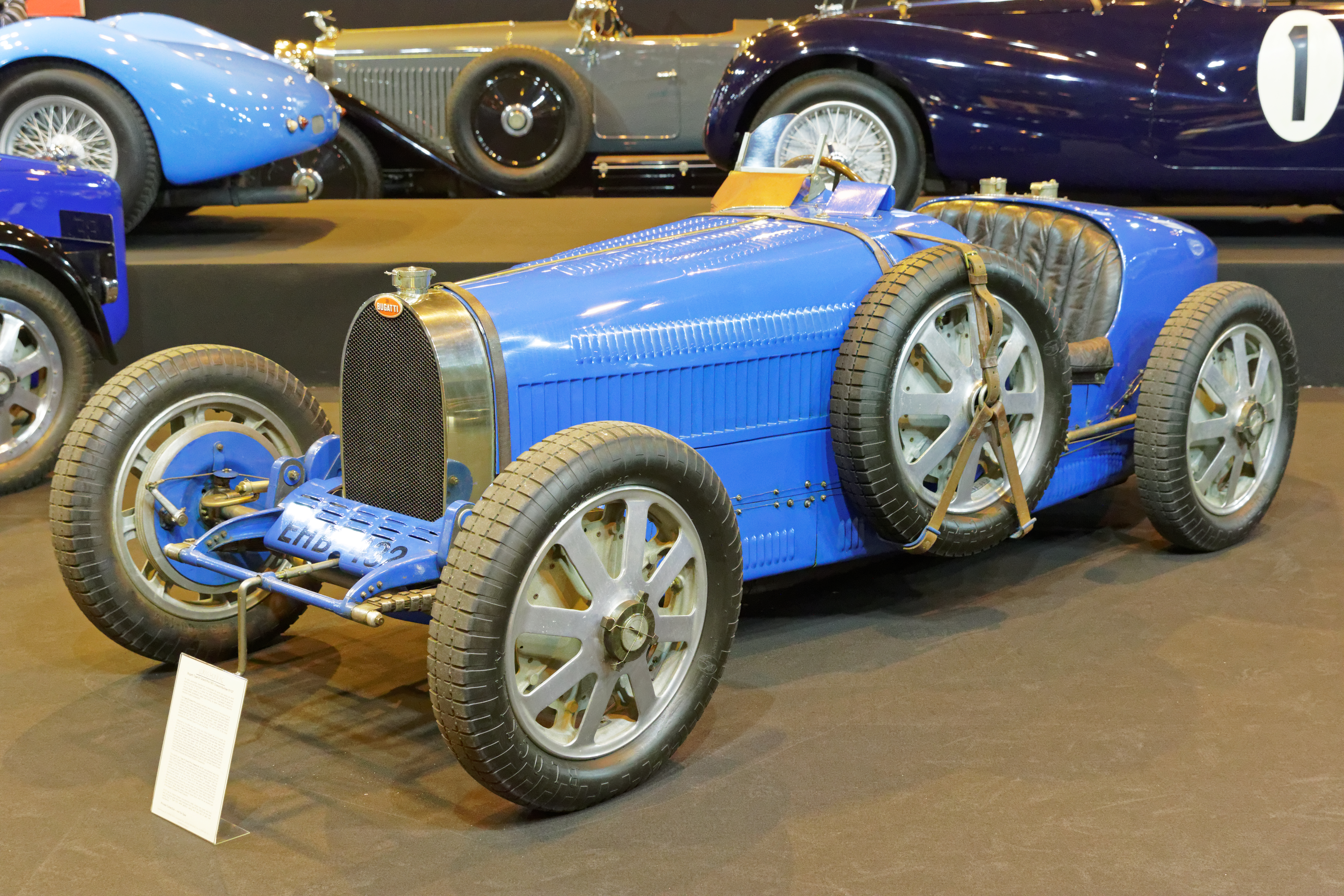
Bugatti Type 51

In October 1930, the CSI regulatory body of the AIACR met to draft up rules for a new championship. The racing bodies of Belgium, France, Italy and Spain would hold events lasting ten hours, with the results merged as a single race- the International Grand Prix. Each body would contribute 150000 francs, and the driver covering the farthest distance over the four races would collect half a million francs. However, that idea was deemed impractical and instead the races should be discrete, individual events. As all the races took place in Europe it was renamed the European Automobile Championship.

The media soon spotted major issues with the proposal – after the abortive Manufacturer's Championship, just a few years earlier. If the field was whittled down after three or four hours, what was to be gained if only a half-dozen cars raced for the latter half of the race? They protested that it would bore the spectators, and drive them away well before the end of the races. However, the CSI was not swayed and confirmed the format in March. The Italian GP was moved from its traditional September to May to be able to run in good daylight and the Spanish GP was dropped from the list. Now the overall winner would receive 150000 francs. The two drivers had to be paired together for all three races and would only score points in the car they had been nominated for. In case of a tie, the driver(s) who had covered the greatest total distance would win the tie-break. The cars would otherwise not be limited, running to Formula Libre. A proposal to run a gasoline/benzole mixture was discarded as Italy had no benzole.

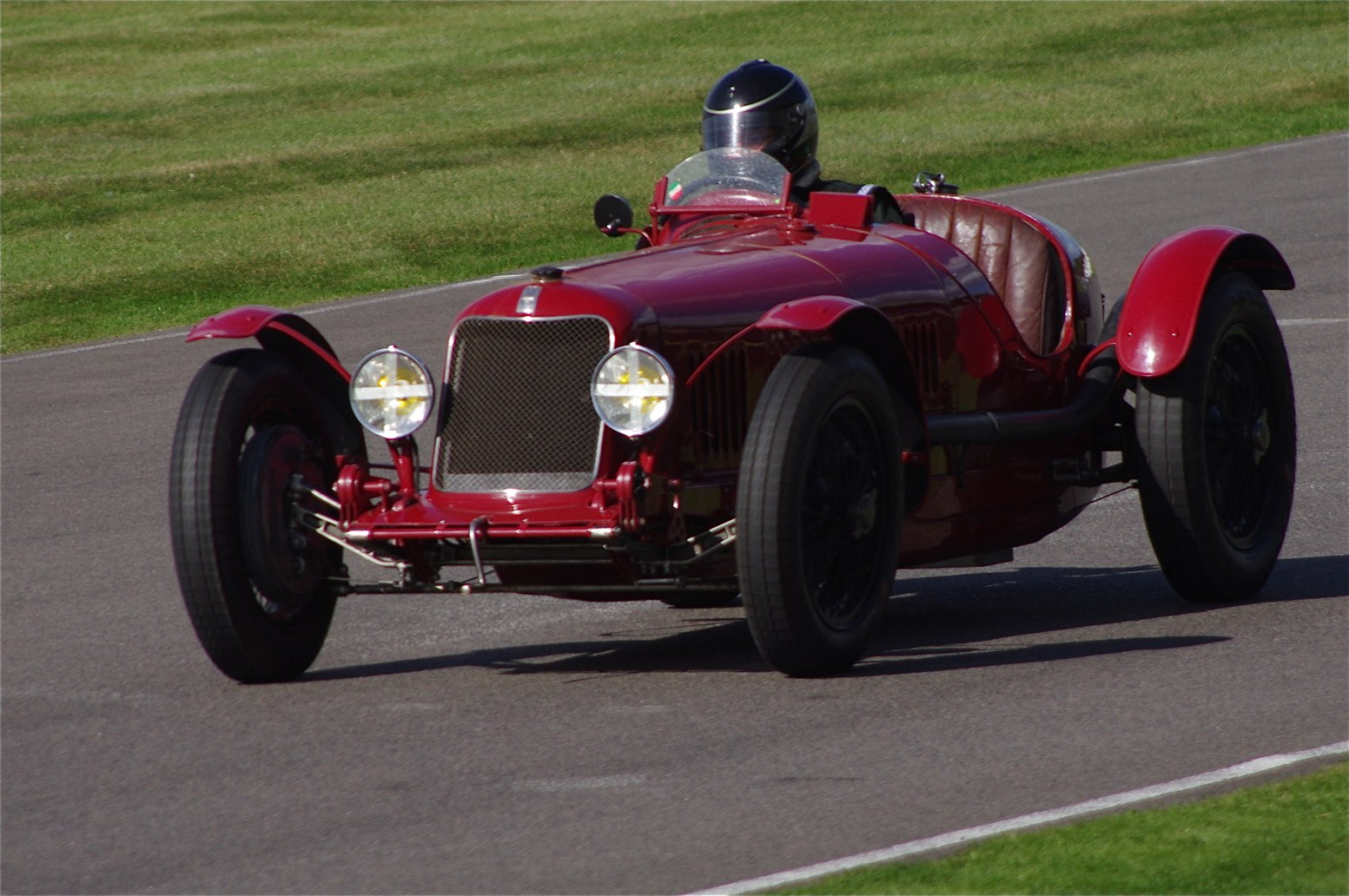
Maserati Tipo 26M

=== Technical Innovation ===
After a lethargic period of years with only incremental development, 1931 saw a good range of new models and innovation from all three main manufacturers. At his son's insistence, Ettore Bugatti had swapped the Millers of American Leon Duray for a trio of Type 43 sports cars in 1929. Examination of the advanced engineering of the Miller engine led to the developed of the Bugatti Type 51. Essentially the same as the Type 35B, still using two valves per cylinder and a single carburettor, it was now fitted with twin overhead camshafts and put out 180 bhp. At the fast Monza Grand Prix, Bugatti also entered the new Type 54 (purportedly produced in only 13 days), with the 5-litre engine of the Type 50 sports car. But despite developing an enormous 300 bhp, raw power on paper was no key to success. Front-heavy, it handled poorly and was terrible on its tyres.

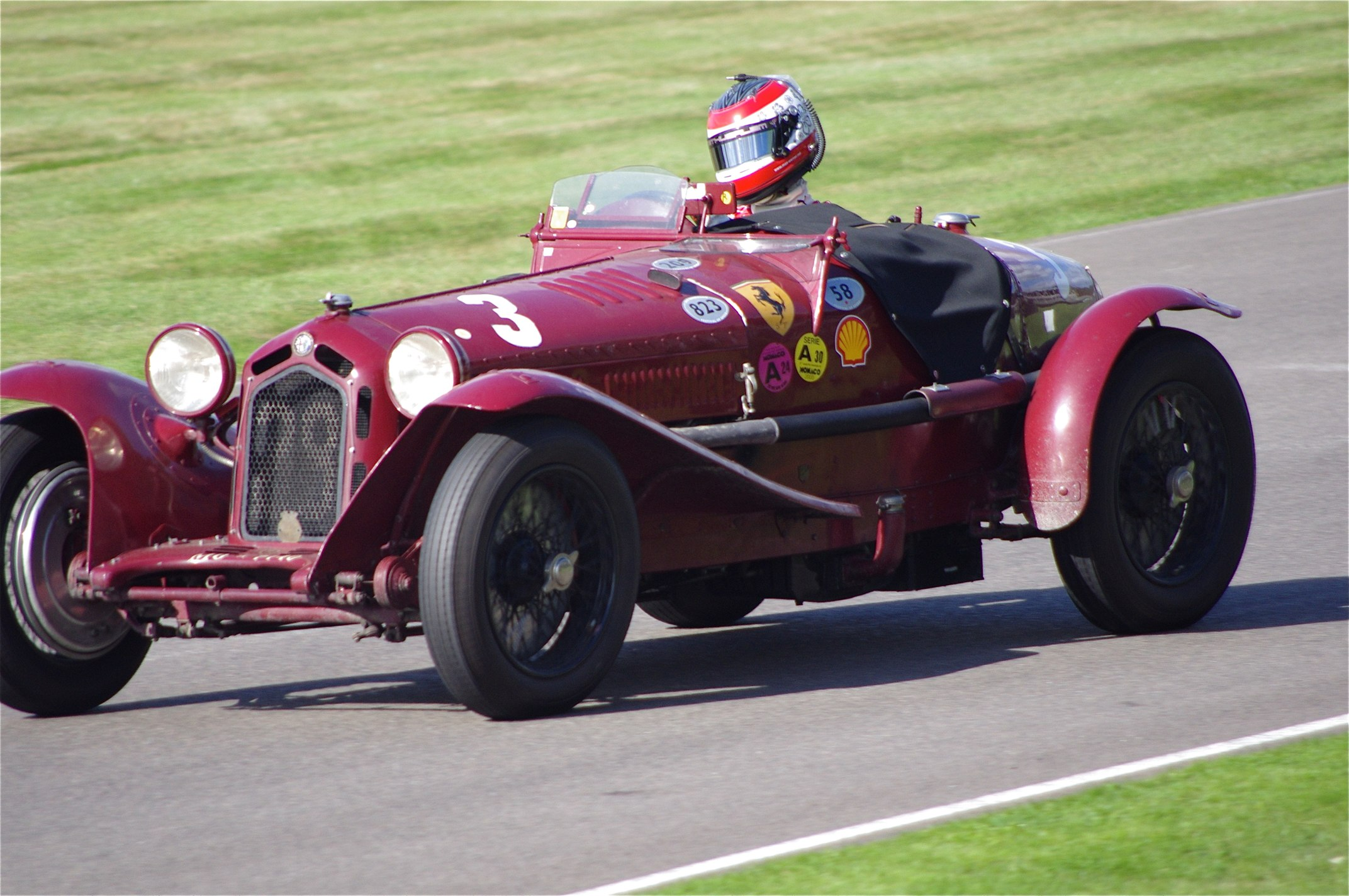
Alfa Romeo 8C 2300 ‘Monza’

Maserati had led the way forward the previous year with the 8C-2500 engine in the Tipo 26M. The brothers further developed the engine, boring it out to 2.8-litres, also introduced at the Monza race. The team continued to run that model through this season, as well as the mighty, twin-engined V4 on the open fast circuits. Voiturette racing was increasing in popularity again, with over a dozen races scheduled for the season. After his success the previous year, Alfieri felt encouraged to develop the 1.5-litre 26C. The new 1.1-litre twin-cam 4-cylinder model – either the 4CS sports car or 4CM (monoposto) single-seater - would soon dominate the small classes, and earn good money for Maserati in both prizemoney and privateer sales.

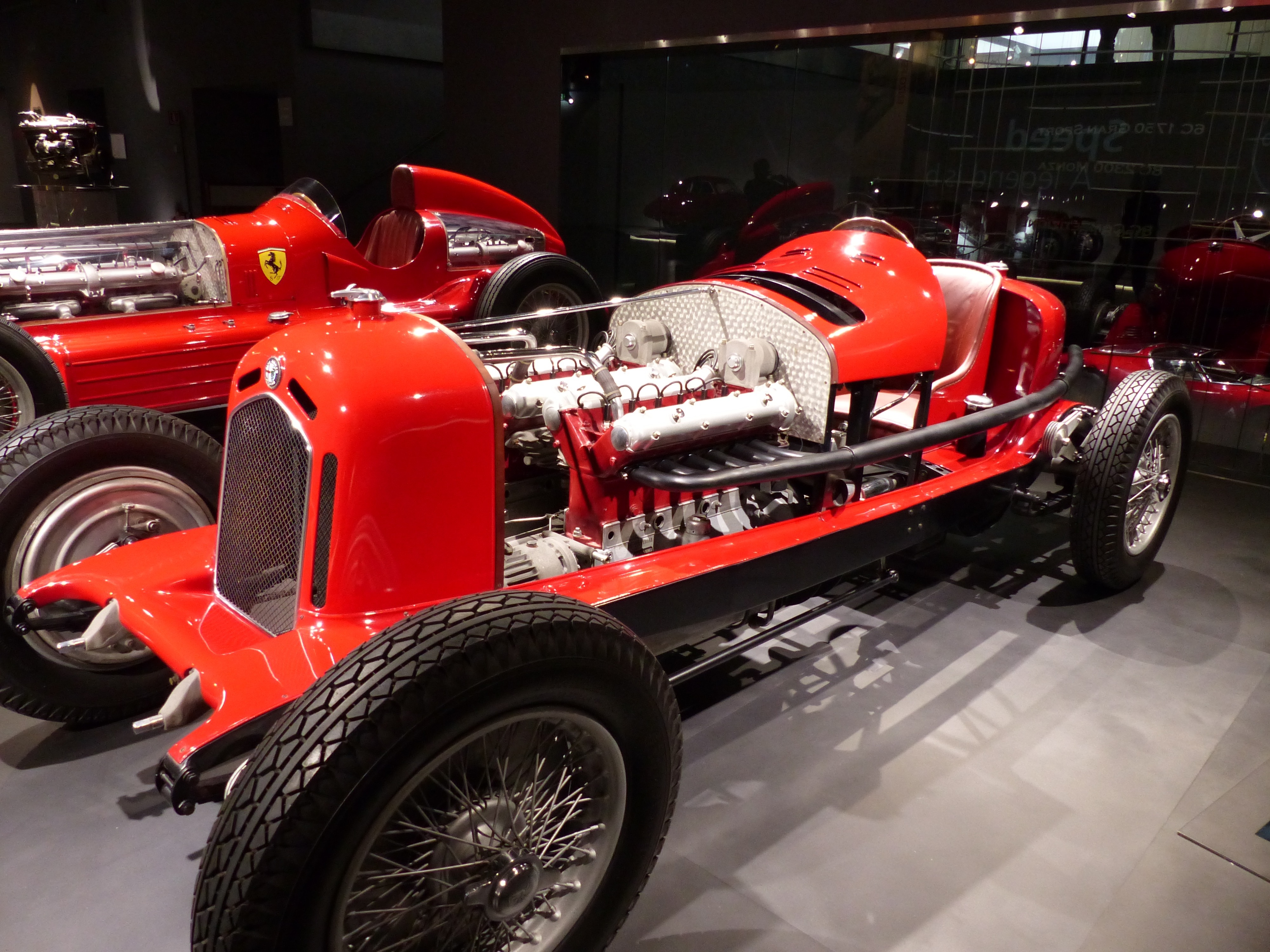
Alfa Romeo Tipo A replica at the Museo Storico

With the final retirement of the Alfa Romeo P2 from front-line racing, Vittorio Jano produced two quite different models for the new Championship. The 8C 2300 was a development from the 6C 1750 sports car. Jano put a pair of 4-cylinder engines back-to-back with a common gear-train linking the two camshafts. Being centrally mounted it minimised the engine torque and vibration. It came in two variants – the long-wheelbase version was the sports car, while the nimbler, short-wheelbase model entered Grand Prix races. To take on the big-engined Mercedes, Jano built the Tipo A. Taking two complete engines of the 6C 1750, and mounting them side by side. The mirror-image arrangement improved traction because of the equal and opposite torque of the engines. Alfa's (and Europe's) first monoposto, the driver sat centrally, over the two driveshafts in a deep, streamlined cockpit. Unlike the twin-engined Bugatti and Maserati, each engine of the Tipo A kept its own power-train with crankcase and driveshaft. A single gear lever controlled both gearboxes with an overrunning clutch. Only four were built.

Manufacturer	Model	Engine	Power Output	Max. Speed (km/h)	Dry Weight (kg)
(France) Bugatti	Type 51	Bugatti 2.3L S8 supercharged	180 bhp	230	750
(France) Bugatti	Type 54	Bugatti 5.0L S8 supercharged	300 bhp	240	930
(France) Bugatti	Type 35B	Bugatti 2.3L S8 supercharged	140 bhp	210	710
(Italy) Maserati	8C-2800	Maserati 2.8L S8 supercharged	205 bhp	225	820
(Italy) Maserati	Tipo V4	Maserati 4.0L twin-8 supercharged	300 bhp	255	1050
(Italy) Maserati	Tipo 26M	Maserati 2.5L S8 supercharged	185 bhp		
(Italy) Alfa Romeo	8C-2300 “Monza”	Alfa Romeo 2.3L S8 supercharged	165 bhp	210	920
(Italy) Alfa Romeo	Tipo A	Alfa Romeo 3.5L twin-6 supercharged	230 bhp	240	930
(Germany) Mercedes-Benz	SSKL	Mercedes-Benz 7.1L S6 part-supercharged	295 bhp	230	1400
(France) Bugatti	Type 51A	Bugatti 1492cc S8 supercharged	135 bhp	200	750

== Teams and drivers ==
The AIACR Championship regulations stipulated that each nominated driver-combination had to compete together in all three races to keep scoring points. Therefore, at the start of the season, at the Italian Grand Prix, the works teams declared these as their driver combinations:

Team	Lead driver	Co-driver
Usines Bugatti	(Italy) Achille Varzi	(Monaco) Louis Chiron
Usines Bugatti	(France) Albert Divo	(France) Guy Bouriat
Usines Bugatti	(United Kingdom) William Grover-Williams	(Italy) Caberto Conelli
Alfa Corse	(Italy) Tazio Nuvolari	(Italy) Baconin Borzacchini
Alfa Corse	(Italy) Giuseppe Campari	(Italy) Luigi Arcangeli † (Italy) Attilio Marinoni
Alfa Corse	(Italy) Attilio Marinoni (Italy) Ferdinando Minoia	(Italy) Goffredo Zehender
Officine Alfieri; Maserati SpA	(Italy) Luigi Fagioli	(Italy) Ernesto Maserati
Officine Alfieri; Maserati SpA	(France) René Dreyfus	(Italy) Pietro Ghersi
Officine Alfieri; Maserati SpA	(Italy) Clemente Biondetti	(Italy) Luigi Parenti

These tables only intend to cover entries in the major races, using the key above. It includes all starters in the Championship races. Sources:

Entrant	Constructor	Chassis	Engine	Tyre	Driver	Rounds
(France) Usines Bugatti	Bugatti	Type 51; Type 54	Bugatti 2.3L S8 s/c Bugatti 5.0L S8 s/c	M / D	(Italy) Achille Varzi	A, B, C, 2, 7, 10
(France) Usines Bugatti	Bugatti	Type 51; Type 54	Bugatti 2.3L S8 s/c Bugatti 5.0L S8 s/c	M / D	(Monaco) Louis Chiron	A, B, 6, C, 2, 7, 8♠, 9♠, 10, 11♠
(France) Usines Bugatti	Bugatti	Type 51; Type 54	Bugatti 2.3L S8 s/c Bugatti 5.0L S8 s/c	M / D	(France) Albert Divo	A, B, C, 2, [7]
(France) Usines Bugatti	Bugatti	Type 51; Type 54	Bugatti 2.3L S8 s/c Bugatti 5.0L S8 s/c	M / D	(France) Guy Bouriat	A, B, C, 2, 7
(France) Usines Bugatti	Bugatti	Type 51; Type 54	Bugatti 2.3L S8 s/c Bugatti 5.0L S8 s/c	M / D	(United Kingdom) William Grover-Williams	B, C, 2♠, 7
(France) Usines Bugatti	Bugatti	Type 51; Type 54	Bugatti 2.3L S8 s/c Bugatti 5.0L S8 s/c	M / D	(Italy) Conte Caberto Conelli	B, C
(Italy) Officine Alfieri Maserati SpA	Maserati	Tipo V4; Tipo 26M; Tipo 26B 8C-2800; 8C-2300; Tipo 26	Maserati 4.0L 2x8 twin s/c Maserati 2.5L S8 s/c Maserati 2.8L S8 s/c Maserati 2.0L S8 s/c Maserati 2.8L S8 s/c Maserati 2.3L S8 s/c Maserati 1.5L S8 s/c	D	(Italy) Luigi Fagioli	B, 1, 2, 3, 4, 5, 7, 8, 9, 10, 11
(Italy) Officine Alfieri Maserati SpA	Maserati	Tipo V4; Tipo 26M; Tipo 26B 8C-2800; 8C-2300; Tipo 26	Maserati 4.0L 2x8 twin s/c Maserati 2.5L S8 s/c Maserati 2.8L S8 s/c Maserati 2.0L S8 s/c Maserati 2.8L S8 s/c Maserati 2.3L S8 s/c Maserati 1.5L S8 s/c	D	(Italy) Ernesto Maserati	[A], B, 1, 5, 9, 10, 11
(Italy) Officine Alfieri Maserati SpA	Maserati	Tipo V4; Tipo 26M; Tipo 26B 8C-2800; 8C-2300; Tipo 26	Maserati 4.0L 2x8 twin s/c Maserati 2.5L S8 s/c Maserati 2.8L S8 s/c Maserati 2.0L S8 s/c Maserati 2.8L S8 s/c Maserati 2.3L S8 s/c Maserati 1.5L S8 s/c	D	(France) René Dreyfus	[A], B, 1, 2, 3♠, 4, 5, 6, 7, 9, 10
(Italy) Officine Alfieri Maserati SpA	Maserati	Tipo V4; Tipo 26M; Tipo 26B 8C-2800; 8C-2300; Tipo 26	Maserati 4.0L 2x8 twin s/c Maserati 2.5L S8 s/c Maserati 2.8L S8 s/c Maserati 2.0L S8 s/c Maserati 2.8L S8 s/c Maserati 2.3L S8 s/c Maserati 1.5L S8 s/c	D	(Italy) Pietro Ghersi	B
(Italy) Officine Alfieri Maserati SpA	Maserati	Tipo V4; Tipo 26M; Tipo 26B 8C-2800; 8C-2300; Tipo 26	Maserati 4.0L 2x8 twin s/c Maserati 2.5L S8 s/c Maserati 2.8L S8 s/c Maserati 2.0L S8 s/c Maserati 2.8L S8 s/c Maserati 2.3L S8 s/c Maserati 1.5L S8 s/c	D	(Italy) Clemente Biondetti	[A], B, 1, 2, 4, 5, [7], 8♠, 9♠, 10♠
(Italy) Officine Alfieri Maserati SpA	Maserati	Tipo V4; Tipo 26M; Tipo 26B 8C-2800; 8C-2300; Tipo 26	Maserati 4.0L 2x8 twin s/c Maserati 2.5L S8 s/c Maserati 2.8L S8 s/c Maserati 2.0L S8 s/c Maserati 2.8L S8 s/c Maserati 2.3L S8 s/c Maserati 1.5L S8 s/c	D	(Italy) Luigi Parenti	B
(Italy) Officine Alfieri Maserati SpA	Maserati	Tipo V4; Tipo 26M; Tipo 26B 8C-2800; 8C-2300; Tipo 26	Maserati 4.0L 2x8 twin s/c Maserati 2.5L S8 s/c Maserati 2.8L S8 s/c Maserati 2.0L S8 s/c Maserati 2.8L S8 s/c Maserati 2.3L S8 s/c Maserati 1.5L S8 s/c	D	(Italy) Umberto Klinger	9
(Italy) Officine Alfieri Maserati SpA	Maserati	Tipo V4; Tipo 26M; Tipo 26B 8C-2800; 8C-2300; Tipo 26	Maserati 4.0L 2x8 twin s/c Maserati 2.5L S8 s/c Maserati 2.8L S8 s/c Maserati 2.0L S8 s/c Maserati 2.8L S8 s/c Maserati 2.3L S8 s/c Maserati 1.5L S8 s/c	D	(Italy) Amedeo Ruggeri	10
(Italy) Alfa Corse	Alfa Romeo	Tipo A 8C 2300; 6C-1750GS	Alfa Romeo 3.5L 2x6 twin s/c Alfa Romeo 2.3L S8 s/c Alfa Romeo 1.75L S6 s/c	P / D	(Italy) Tazio Nuvolari	A, B, C, [2], 4, 10
(Italy) Alfa Corse	Alfa Romeo	Tipo A 8C 2300; 6C-1750GS	Alfa Romeo 3.5L 2x6 twin s/c Alfa Romeo 2.3L S8 s/c Alfa Romeo 1.75L S6 s/c	P / D	(Italy) Baconin Borzacchini	A, B, C, [2], 4, 10
(Italy) Alfa Corse	Alfa Romeo	Tipo A 8C 2300; 6C-1750GS	Alfa Romeo 3.5L 2x6 twin s/c Alfa Romeo 2.3L S8 s/c Alfa Romeo 1.75L S6 s/c	P / D	(Italy) Giuseppe Campari	A, B, C, 4, 10
(Italy) Alfa Corse	Alfa Romeo	Tipo A 8C 2300; 6C-1750GS	Alfa Romeo 3.5L 2x6 twin s/c Alfa Romeo 2.3L S8 s/c Alfa Romeo 1.75L S6 s/c	P / D	(Italy) Ferdinando Minoia	A, B, C, 10
(Italy) Alfa Corse	Alfa Romeo	Tipo A 8C 2300; 6C-1750GS	Alfa Romeo 3.5L 2x6 twin s/c Alfa Romeo 2.3L S8 s/c Alfa Romeo 1.75L S6 s/c	P / D	(Italy) Conte Goffredo Zehender	[A], B, C, 4
(Italy) Alfa Corse	Alfa Romeo	Tipo A 8C 2300; 6C-1750GS	Alfa Romeo 3.5L 2x6 twin s/c Alfa Romeo 2.3L S8 s/c Alfa Romeo 1.75L S6 s/c	P / D	(Italy) Luigi Arcangeli	[A]†, [2], 4
(Italy) Alfa Corse	Alfa Romeo	Tipo A 8C 2300; 6C-1750GS	Alfa Romeo 3.5L 2x6 twin s/c Alfa Romeo 2.3L S8 s/c Alfa Romeo 1.75L S6 s/c	P / D	(Italy) Giovanni Minozzi	B, C, 10
(Italy) Alfa Corse	Alfa Romeo	Tipo A 8C 2300; 6C-1750GS	Alfa Romeo 3.5L 2x6 twin s/c Alfa Romeo 2.3L S8 s/c Alfa Romeo 1.75L S6 s/c	P / D	(Italy) Marquis Guido d'Ippolito	4
(Italy) Scuderia Ferrari	Alfa Romeo	6C-1750; Tipo A 8C 2300; 6C-1500 SS	Alfa Romeo 1.75L S6 s/c Alfa Romeo 3.5L 2x6 s/c Alfa Romeo 2.3L S8 s/c Alfa Romeo 1.5L S6 s/c	P	(Italy) Mario Tadini	A, 3
(Italy) Scuderia Ferrari	Alfa Romeo	6C-1750; Tipo A 8C 2300; 6C-1500 SS	Alfa Romeo 1.75L S6 s/c Alfa Romeo 3.5L 2x6 s/c Alfa Romeo 2.3L S8 s/c Alfa Romeo 1.5L S6 s/c	P	(Italy) Alfredo Caniato	A, 3
(Italy) Scuderia Ferrari	Alfa Romeo	6C-1750; Tipo A 8C 2300; 6C-1500 SS	Alfa Romeo 1.75L S6 s/c Alfa Romeo 3.5L 2x6 s/c Alfa Romeo 2.3L S8 s/c Alfa Romeo 1.5L S6 s/c	P	(Italy) Conte Goffredo Zehender	2
(Italy) Scuderia Ferrari	Alfa Romeo	6C-1750; Tipo A 8C 2300; 6C-1500 SS	Alfa Romeo 1.75L S6 s/c Alfa Romeo 3.5L 2x6 s/c Alfa Romeo 2.3L S8 s/c Alfa Romeo 1.5L S6 s/c	P	(Italy) Tazio Nuvolari	3, 5♠, 7, 8, 9, 11
(Italy) Scuderia Ferrari	Alfa Romeo	6C-1750; Tipo A 8C 2300; 6C-1500 SS	Alfa Romeo 1.75L S6 s/c Alfa Romeo 3.5L 2x6 s/c Alfa Romeo 2.3L S8 s/c Alfa Romeo 1.5L S6 s/c	P	(Italy) Luigi Arcangeli	3†
(Italy) Scuderia Ferrari	Alfa Romeo	6C-1750; Tipo A 8C 2300; 6C-1500 SS	Alfa Romeo 1.75L S6 s/c Alfa Romeo 3.5L 2x6 s/c Alfa Romeo 2.3L S8 s/c Alfa Romeo 1.5L S6 s/c	P	(Italy) Francesco Severi	3, 8, 9
(Italy) Scuderia Ferrari	Alfa Romeo	6C-1750; Tipo A 8C 2300; 6C-1500 SS	Alfa Romeo 1.75L S6 s/c Alfa Romeo 3.5L 2x6 s/c Alfa Romeo 2.3L S8 s/c Alfa Romeo 1.5L S6 s/c	P	(Italy) Baconin Borzacchini	[7], 8, 9, 11
(Italy) Scuderia Ferrari	Alfa Romeo	6C-1750; Tipo A 8C 2300; 6C-1500 SS	Alfa Romeo 1.75L S6 s/c Alfa Romeo 3.5L 2x6 s/c Alfa Romeo 2.3L S8 s/c Alfa Romeo 1.5L S6 s/c	P	(Italy) Giuseppe Campari	8, 9
(Italy) Scuderia Ferrari	Alfa Romeo	6C-1750; Tipo A 8C 2300; 6C-1500 SS	Alfa Romeo 1.75L S6 s/c Alfa Romeo 3.5L 2x6 s/c Alfa Romeo 2.3L S8 s/c Alfa Romeo 1.5L S6 s/c	P	(Italy) Guglielmo Carraroli	8
(Italy) Scuderia Ferrari	Alfa Romeo	6C-1750; Tipo A 8C 2300; 6C-1500 SS	Alfa Romeo 1.75L S6 s/c Alfa Romeo 3.5L 2x6 s/c Alfa Romeo 2.3L S8 s/c Alfa Romeo 1.5L S6 s/c	P	(Italy) Franco Cortese	8
(Italy) Scuderia Ferrari	Alfa Romeo	6C-1750; Tipo A 8C 2300; 6C-1500 SS	Alfa Romeo 1.75L S6 s/c Alfa Romeo 3.5L 2x6 s/c Alfa Romeo 2.3L S8 s/c Alfa Romeo 1.5L S6 s/c	P	(Italy) Marquis Guido d'Ippolito	8
(Italy) Scuderia Ferrari	Alfa Romeo	6C-1750; Tipo A 8C 2300; 6C-1500 SS	Alfa Romeo 1.75L S6 s/c Alfa Romeo 3.5L 2x6 s/c Alfa Romeo 2.3L S8 s/c Alfa Romeo 1.5L S6 s/c	P	(Italy) Umberto Klinger	3♠, 8
(Italy) Scuderia Ferrari	Alfa Romeo	6C-1750; Tipo A 8C 2300; 6C-1500 SS	Alfa Romeo 1.75L S6 s/c Alfa Romeo 3.5L 2x6 s/c Alfa Romeo 2.3L S8 s/c Alfa Romeo 1.5L S6 s/c	P	(Italy) Eugenio Siena	11
(Germany) German Bugatti Team	Bugatti	Type 35B; Type 35C; Type 51	Bugatti 2.3L S8 s/c Bugatti 2.0L S8 s/c Bugatti 2.3L S8 s/c	C	(Germany) Heinrich-Joachim von Morgen	1♠, 2, 3, 7, 11
(Germany) German Bugatti Team	Bugatti	Type 35B; Type 35C; Type 51	Bugatti 2.3L S8 s/c Bugatti 2.0L S8 s/c Bugatti 2.3L S8 s/c	C	(Germany) Ernst-Günther Burggaller	2, 3, 7
(Germany) German Bugatti Team	Bugatti	Type 35B; Type 35C; Type 51	Bugatti 2.3L S8 s/c Bugatti 2.0L S8 s/c Bugatti 2.3L S8 s/c	C	(Germany) Hermann, Prinz zu Leiningen	2, 3, 11
(Italy) Scuderia Materassi	Talbot	700 GPLB	Talbot 1.75L S8 s/c Talbot 1.5L S8 s/c		(Italy) Amedeo Ruggeri	A, [4♠] 5, 8, 9♠
(Italy) Scuderia Materassi	Talbot	700 GPLB	Talbot 1.75L S8 s/c Talbot 1.5L S8 s/c		(Italy) Renato Balestrero	A
(Italy) Scuderia Materassi	Talbot	700 GPLB	Talbot 1.75L S8 s/c Talbot 1.5L S8 s/c		(Italy) Carlo di Vecchio	A♠, 3♠, 8, [10]
(Italy) Scuderia Materassi	Talbot	700 GPLB	Talbot 1.75L S8 s/c Talbot 1.5L S8 s/c		(Italy) Gerolamo Ferrari	A♠
(France) Count Boris Ivanowski	Mercedes-Benz Bugatti	SSK; Type 35B	Mercedes-Benz 7.1L S6 s/c Bugatti 2.3L S8 s/c		(Russia) Count Boris Ivanowski (France)	A, B, C; [2], [6], [7]
(France) Count Boris Ivanowski	Mercedes-Benz Bugatti	SSK; Type 35B	Mercedes-Benz 7.1L S6 s/c Bugatti 2.3L S8 s/c		(France) Henri Stoffel	A, B, C
(France) Count Boris Ivanowski	Mercedes-Benz Bugatti	SSK; Type 35B	Mercedes-Benz 7.1L S6 s/c Bugatti 2.3L S8 s/c		(France) Edmond Bourlier	B
(France) Count Boris Ivanowski	Mercedes-Benz Bugatti	SSK; Type 35B	Mercedes-Benz 7.1L S6 s/c Bugatti 2.3L S8 s/c		(Italy) Emilio Eminente	B, 10♠

=== Significant Privateer drivers ===
Entrant	Constructor	Chassis	Engine	Driver	Rounds
Private Entrant	Bugatti	Type 51; Type 37	Bugatti 2.3L S8 s/c Bugatti 1.5L S4 s/c	(France) Jean-Pierre Wimille	A, B, C; [1], 7
Private Entrant	Bugatti	Type 51; Type 37	Bugatti 2.3L S8 s/c Bugatti 1.5L S4 s/c	(France) Jean Gaupillat	A, B, C; 1, 6
Private Entrant	Bugatti	Type 35B; Type 51	Bugatti 2.3L S8 s/c	(French Algeria) Marcel Lehoux	A, B, 1, 2, 6, 7, 10, 11
Private Entrant	Bugatti Bugatti Alfa Romeo	Type 35C; Type 51; 8C 2300	Bugatti 2.0L S8 s/c Bugatti 2.3L S8 s/c Alfa Romeo 2.3L S8 s/c	(France) Philippe Étancelin	A, B, 1, 2, 6, 10
Private Entrant	Delage	Type 15S8	Delage 1.5L S8 s/c	(France) Robert Sénéchal	A, B
Private Entrant	Delage	Type 15S8	Delage 1.5L S8 s/c	(France) Henri Frètet	A, B
Private Entrant	Maserati Bugatti	Type 26M; Type 35B	Maserati 2.5L S8 s/c Bugatti 2.3L S8 s/c	(Italy) Pietro Ghersi	A, 3, 8, 9, 10
Private Entrant	Maserati Bugatti	Type 26M; Type 35B	Maserati 2.5L S8 s/c Bugatti 2.3L S8 s/c	(Italy) Umberto Klinger	A, 1, 3
Private Entrant	Alfa Romeo	6C-1500	Alfa Romeo 1.5L S6	(Italy) Francesco “Nino” Pirola	A; 10
Private Entrant	Alfa Romeo	6C-1500	Alfa Romeo 1.5L S6	(Italy) Conte Giovanni "Johnny" Lurani	A
Private Entrant	Maserati Alfa Romeo	Type 26M; 8C 2300	Maserati 2.5L S8; Alfa Romeo 2.3L S8 s/c	(United Kingdom) Capt Henry “Tim” Birkin	B, C; [2], 7
Private Entrant	Maserati Alfa Romeo	Type 26M; 8C 2300	Maserati 2.5L S8; Alfa Romeo 2.3L S8 s/c	(United Kingdom) Capt George Eyston	B
Private Entrant	Alfa Romeo	6C-1750 SS	Alfa Romeo 1.75L S6	(France) Jean Pesato	B, C; [11]
Private Entrant	Alfa Romeo	6C-1750 SS	Alfa Romeo 1.75L S6	(France) Dr Pierre Félix	B, C
Private Entrant	Bugatti	Type 35B; Type 35C	Bugatti 2.3L S8 s/c Bugatti 2.0L S8 s/c	(France) Comte Georges d’Arnoux	B, 1, 3, 6, [8]
Private Entrant	Bugatti	Type 35B; Type 35C	Bugatti 2.3L S8 s/c Bugatti 2.0L S8 s/c	(France) Max Fourny	B, [1], 6
Private Entrant	Mercedes-Benz	SSKL	Mercedes-Benz 7.1L S6 s/c	(Germany) Rudolf Caracciola	B, 2, 7, 11
Private Entrant	Mercedes-Benz	SSKL	Mercedes-Benz 7.1L S6 s/c	(Germany) Otto Merz	B, 7
Private Entrant	Bugatti Delage	Type 51; 15S8	Bugatti 2.3L S8 s/c Delage 1.5L S8 s/c	(United Kingdom) Earl Howe	B, 2, 7
Private Entrant	Bugatti Delage	Type 51; 15S8	Bugatti 2.3L S8 s/c Delage 1.5L S8 s/c	(United Kingdom) Baron Essendon	B, C
Private Entrant	Peugeot Maserati	Type 174 Sport; Type 26M	Peugeot 2.0L S8 s/c Maserati 2.5L S8 s/c	(France) René Ferrand	B; 6
Private Entrant	Peugeot Maserati	Type 174 Sport; Type 26M	Peugeot 2.0L S8 s/c Maserati 2.5L S8 s/c	(France) Louis Rigal	B
Private Entrant	Sunbeam	1925 GP	Sunbeam 2.0L S6 s/c	(United Kingdom) Jack Dunfee	B
Private Entrant	Sunbeam	1925 GP	Sunbeam 2.0L S6 s/c	(United Kingdom) . Appleyard	B
Private Entrant	Bugatti	Type 35C	Bugatti 2.0L S8 s/c	(Italy) Enzo Grimaldi	B
Private Entrant	Bugatti	Type 35C	Bugatti 2.0L S8 s/c	(Italy) . Borgiat	B
Private Entrant	Delage	Type 15S8	Delage 1.5L S8 s/c	(United Kingdom) William Scott	B
Private Entrant	Delage	Type 15S8	Delage 1.5L S8 s/c	(United Kingdom) Sydenham Armstrong-Payne	B
Private Entrant	Montier	Spéciale	Ford 3.3L S4	(France) Ferdinand Montier	C
Private Entrant	Montier	Spéciale	Ford 3.3L S4	(France) Charles Montier	C
Private Entrant	Montier	Spéciale	Ford 3.3L S4	(France) . Ducolombier	C
Private Entrant	Bugatti	Type 35C; Type 51	Bugatti 2.0L S8 s/c Bugatti 2.3L S8 s/c	(Poland) Count Stanisław Czaykowski (France)	1, 2, 6, 10
Private Entrant	Bugatti	Type 51	Bugatti 2.3L S8 s/c	(Italy) Achille Varzi	1, 3, 4, 5, 8, 9, 11
Private Entrant	Maserati Talbot Bugatti	Type 26M; 700; Type 39A	Maserati 2.5L S8; Talbot 1.5L S8 s/c Bugatti 1.5L S4	(Italy) Conte Luigi Castelbarco	[A]; 1, 3, 5, 8, 10
Private Entrant	Bugatti	Type 35C	Bugatti 2.0L S8 s/c	(Italy) Giovanni Minozzi	3, 5, 8
Private Entrant	Talbot Bugatti	700 GPLB; Type 35C	Talbot 1.75L S8 s/c Bugatti 2.0L S8 s/c	(Italy) Renato Balestrero	5, [8], 9, 10
Private Entrant	Bugatti	Type 35C	Bugatti 2.0L S8 s/c	(France) "Hellé Nice" (Hélène Delangle)	6, 10
Private Entrant	Mercedes-Benz	SSK	Mercedes-Benz 7.1L S6 s/c	(Germany) Hans Stuck	7, 11

Note: * raced in event as a relief driver, ♠ Works driver raced as a privateer. Those in brackets show, although entered, the driver did not race
Note: † driver killed during this racing season

== Season review ==
=== Start of the season ===
The start of the year saw the first Winter Grand Prix. The Swedish Automobile Club had regularly run a road-race from Stockholm to Gothenburg. This year they mapped out a 50km course on the narrow roads through the woods near Lake Rämen. The pits and grandstands were built near the local railway station by the lake and oversaw a 2km stretch on the frozen lake. The 20 starters were mainly made up of local drivers with a diverse range of cars. These included a number of big-engined American stock cars, as well as a 1.5-litre Bugatti Type 37 and a 1.6-litre four-wheel drive Tracta. Two Finnish drivers, Karl Ebb and "Baron" Johan Ramsay travelled across but the big draw-card was German champion Rudi Caracciola driving his Mercedes SSK. Another SSK was entered by young Swede Per-Victor Widengren, returning from studies in the US and Germany. On race-day, trains bought 30000 spectators to the track. Forty minutes after the start, Ebb’s Auburn came by leading the first lap from Widengren, Olsson and Caracciola. On the second lap, Ebb slid into a snowbank blocking the road. Olsson and Widengren had to stop and help push him clear to get past. Ebb waved Widengren through to take the lead. But both Mercedes retired at the halfway point with mechanical issues. When Olsson lost twenty minutes after sliding into a ditch, it gave Ebb a comfortable lead he held to the end. Ramsay made it a Finnish 1-2 coming home almost a quarter hour behind, both having used studded tyres, rather than chains, through the snow.

The Tunis Grand Prix was the culmination of a week of festivities celebrating the 50th anniversary of being a French protectorate, with the French president in attendance. With a dozen main class and seventeen voiturettes, it attracted a good field, led by the four-car Maserati works team. Luigi Fagioli and new team-driver René Dreyfus had the proven 26M, Clemente Biondetti the big V4, while Ernesto Maserati ran one of the original 1.5-litre Tipo 26 in the junior class. Achille Varzi arrived as a privateer with the brand new Bugatti Type 51. Algerian Marcel Lehoux and German Heinrich-Joachim von Morgen ran the older Type 35B, while Philippe Étancelin and Polish émigré Count Stanisław Czaykowski had 2-litre Type 35C’s. This year, the race was held on a new triangular circuit outside the ancient city of Carthage. Strangely von Morgen's car was sabotaged on the ship from Europe when someone fed a piece of sacking into the fuel tank which then dissolved into the engine. Though Fagioli led the first lap, Varzi soon passed him and started building a lead, with Lehoux in third. When Fagioli had plug issues and Varzi a puncture, Lehoux was able to move into second. Despite having to stop for another puncture, Varzi gave the Type 51 a win on debut. An exciting duel for second lasted most of the race, with Fagioli's Maserati beating home Lehoux by just fifteen seconds. Maserati comfortably won the "voiturette" class finishing eighth overall, and over ten minutes ahead of Pierre Veyron’s Bugatti.

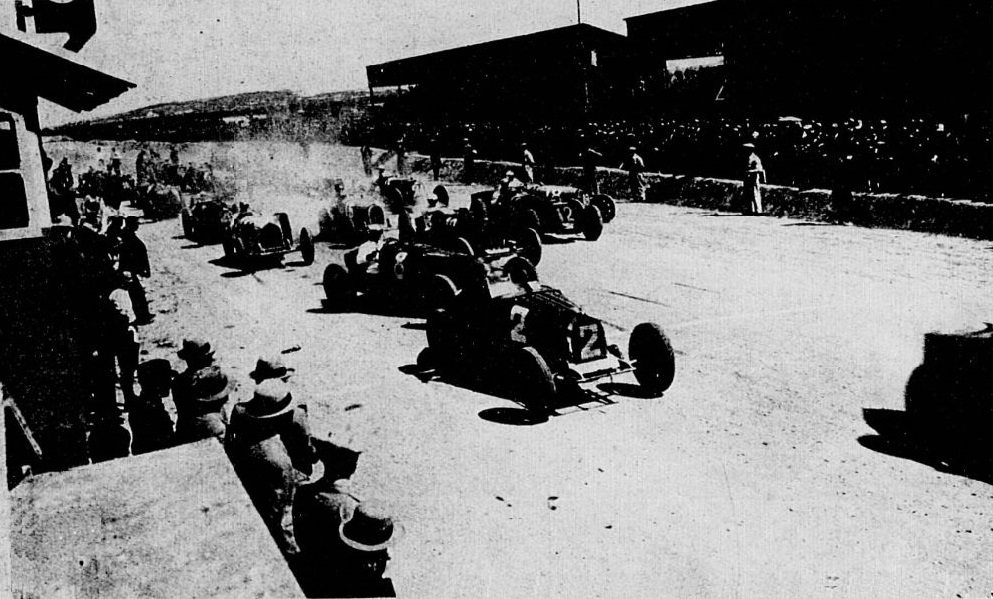
Start of the Tunisian GP

=== Monaco ===
The next major race was the lucrative Monaco Grand Prix. With 100000 francs prizemoney for the winner, it was already establishing itself as one of the glamour events on the calendar. The organisers had an invitation list that attracted a top-class field. The Maserati team and the top French drivers were back from Africa. The Bugatti works team arrived in force with Varzi joined by Louis Chiron, Albert Divo and Guy Bouriat running the new Type 51. The English Earl Howe was the first buyer of the new model (repainted in British racing green), leading a flotilla of privateer Bugattis, along with von Morgen's full German Bugatti Team. The Alfa Romeo works team gave Tazio Nuvolari the new 8C-2300. Luigi Arcangeli and Baconin Borzacchini had the 6C-1750GS, as did Goffredo Zehender driving for the Scuderia Ferrari. On such a tight track, the three big sports cars were quite incongruous: Caracciola now had the new lightweight Mercedes SSKL, fresh from a great win in the Mille Miglia the week before. Count Boris Ivanowski ran Caracciola's former SSK and French veteran André Boillot ran a 7-year old Peugeot 174. Being a street circuit, the one-hour practice had to be held at 6am on Thursday and Friday mornings. Notable absentees were the Alfa Romeo team, whose Pirelli tyres had proven very poor in the Mille Miglia. Ivanowski only arrived on Saturday night after all practice had finished and was denied entry. René Dreyfus had drawn pole position and led the first few laps. “Williams” barged past but lost his engine on only the sixth lap. By the tenth lap, the top six were barely ten seconds apart with Varzi now just ahead of Dreyfus, Lehoux, Fagioli, Chiron and Caracciola. On lap 29, Varzi came into the pits on three wheels after smashing the other one on a curbstone. The repairs cost him four minutes and dropped him to sixth. With Dreyfus, Divo and Lehoux also experiencing issues, it was Chiron and Fagioli now setting the pace. After 50 laps, at the half-way point, only five of the remaining fifteen runners were still on the lead lap: Chiron forty seconds ahead of Fagioli, then Bouriat, Caracciola and Varzi. Howe was sixth, two laps back. Soon after, Caracciola crawled into the pits with his clutch broken. Bouriat took second place from Fagioli, who was having fuel-pressure problems, and having to navigate the twisty circuit one-handed while simultaneously pumping fuel with the other. Chiron was not slowing down, and put in the fastest lap of the race on lap 80, which Fagioli matched four laps later despite his fuel-flow issues. Bouriat had a late stop to change sparkplugs that dropped him to fifth. But no-one could catch Chiron, who took the flag a comfortable three minutes ahead of Fagioli and Varzi, winning his home Grand Prix. In a timekeeping blunder, the officials miscounted and dropped the flag a lap early. The crowds then poured onto the track and stopped the other finishers. Boillot and his Peugeot tourer came in sixth, behind Bouriat (Bugatti) and Zehender (Ferrari) after not having to stop during the race.

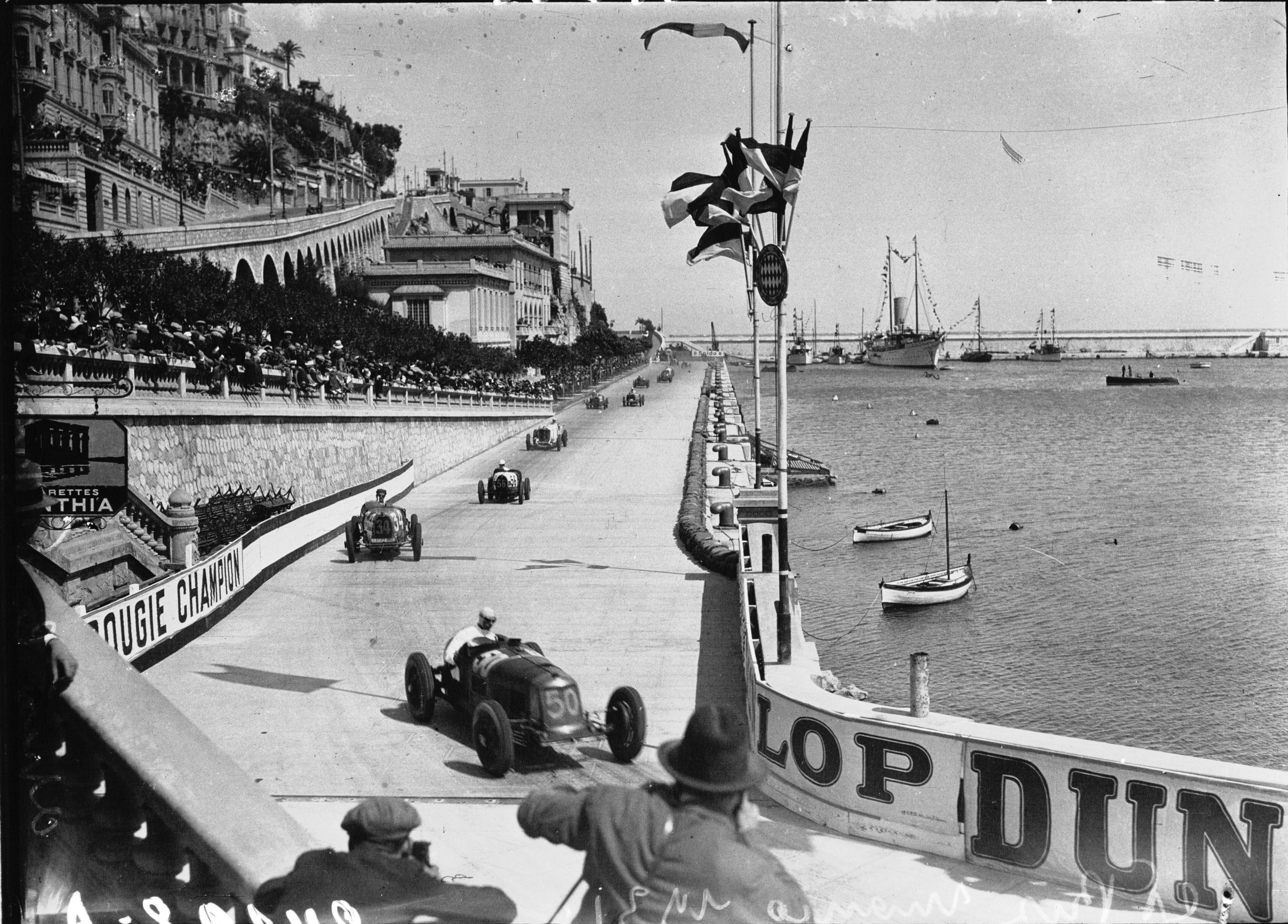
Dreyfus in front of the field along the waterfront at Monaco

Just a week later, the first Italian race was held, at Alessandria. This year, the long 32 km circuit through the Piedmont countryside was replaced by a shorter 8 km track through the northern suburbs. The track proved a minefield though with a lot of loose stones scattered across the road being picked up by the cars. Fagioli again represented Maserati, with Dreyfus as reserve. But Varzi was the favourite with a new Type 51, painted red and driven straight from the Molsheim factory the day before. He was supported by a number of Bugattis including the German team. Alfa Romeo was represented by a strong Scuderia Ferrari team. Nuvolari had an 8C-2300 modified for grand prix use, while Arcangeli, Severi and Caniato drove the less powerful 6-cylinder models. A big field of 39 cars, including voiturettes took the start. Varzi short through from the second row to take the lead and was never headed, drawing away at five seconds a lap. Fagioli broke his gearbox on lap 3 and Nuvolari’s differential broke on lap 9. On route to victory, Varzi lapped all the field except for Giovanni Minozzi's Bugatti with von Morgen coming in third.

=== Targa Florio ===
Always the toughest race of the year, the Targa Florio was made far harder by terrible floods across Sicily in February. Landslides had demolished the mountain roads between Polizzi and Collessano and many parts of the Medio Madonie were ruined. Therefore, Comte Vincenzo Florio and the organisers decided to run the race on the “Grande Madonie” – the full 146 km circuit used in the first years of the event, from 1906 to 1911. This ran all the way around the Parco delle Madonie out to Castelbuono before rejoining the Medio circuit at Collessano. To do the four race laps, driver would take over 8000 corners. Alfa Romeo put in the strongest team, with five cars: Nuvolari and Arcangeli ran the 8C-2300, while Campari, Borzacchini and Guido d'Ippolito had the 6C-1750GS. The competition would come from Varzi's Bugatti and the works Maseratis of Fagioli (still recovering after a recent hip operation), Dreyfus (the only foreigner racing this year) and Biondetti all running the 26M. Varzi led the small field of thirteen starters away and quickly set the pace. Near Castellana, Fagioli hit a bridge and badly bent his rear axle. After two laps it started raining. Jano had predicted that and fitted his Alfas with mudguards. Varzi, without them, was hindered and slowed by the mud and spray. Arcangeli also refused to have the mudguards fitted, and got injured in the eye by a flying stone, to be relieved by Zehender. Biondetti slid into a wall, getting slight injuries. Dreyfus, after changing fourteen spark-plugs and slipping off the road three times, was retired when the team realised he would not finish within the time limit. But Nuvolari and Borzacchini, also aided by the Alfa Romeo team using two-way radios around the track, pressed on hard through the heavy weather. Fog and torrential rain in the mountains made driving extremely hard, with the tyre ruts tearing up the roads. Varzi had a terrible final lap and he although finished first (car and driver completely covered in the yellow mud), Nuvolari had the shorter race-time to take the win. Borzacchini came in second, with Varzi ending up seven minutes back, just ahead of Campari.

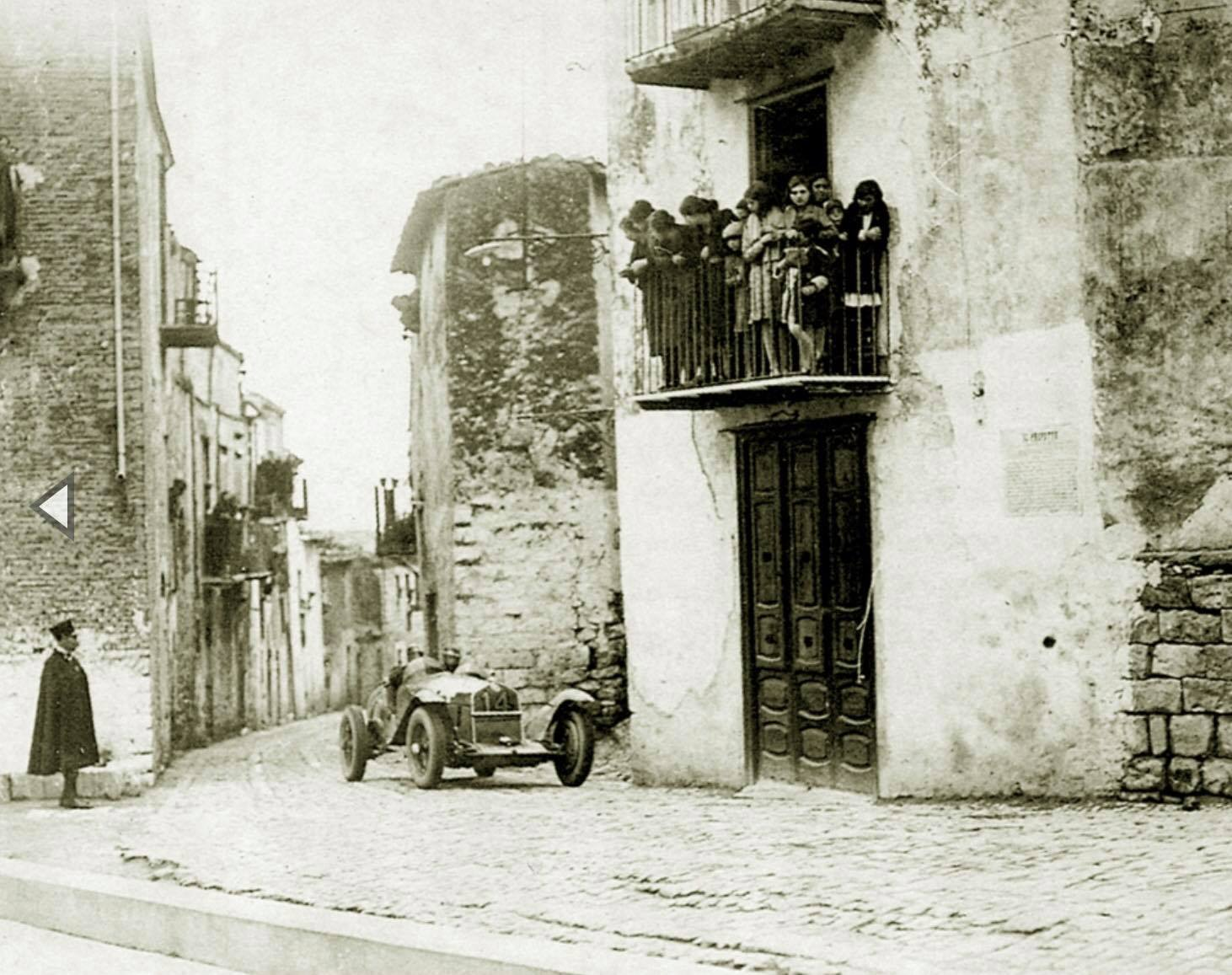
Nuvolari driving through Castelbuono in the Targa Florio

The Moroccan Grand Prix had been held five times as a touring car race. This year, renamed as the Casablanca GP, it was held for racing cars on the new Anfa circuit in the western suburbs of Casablanca. Many of the top drivers from the French circuit came across for the race. Stanisław Czaykowski had just received his new Bugatti Type 51 and so was the favourite. Lehoux and Étancelin were still waiting for their new Bugatti and Alfa Romeo, respectively, to be delivered and ran their older Bugatti Type 35s instead. Montier, father and son had their Ford specials while Ferrand ran his old Peugeot. The voiturette class was dominated by 1.5-litre Bugatti Type 37s. A sunny race-day drew a huge crowd with the dignitaries led by Sidi Mohammed, the Sultan of Morocco, along with the Grand Vizier and the French Resident-General Lucien Saint. Lehoux let for the first half of the race, but he had to stop to refuel whereas Czaykowski did not. The latter took the lead, and when Lehoux retired with an overstretched engine, he could cruise to victory with Étancelin second, a lap behind.

=== The European Championship ===
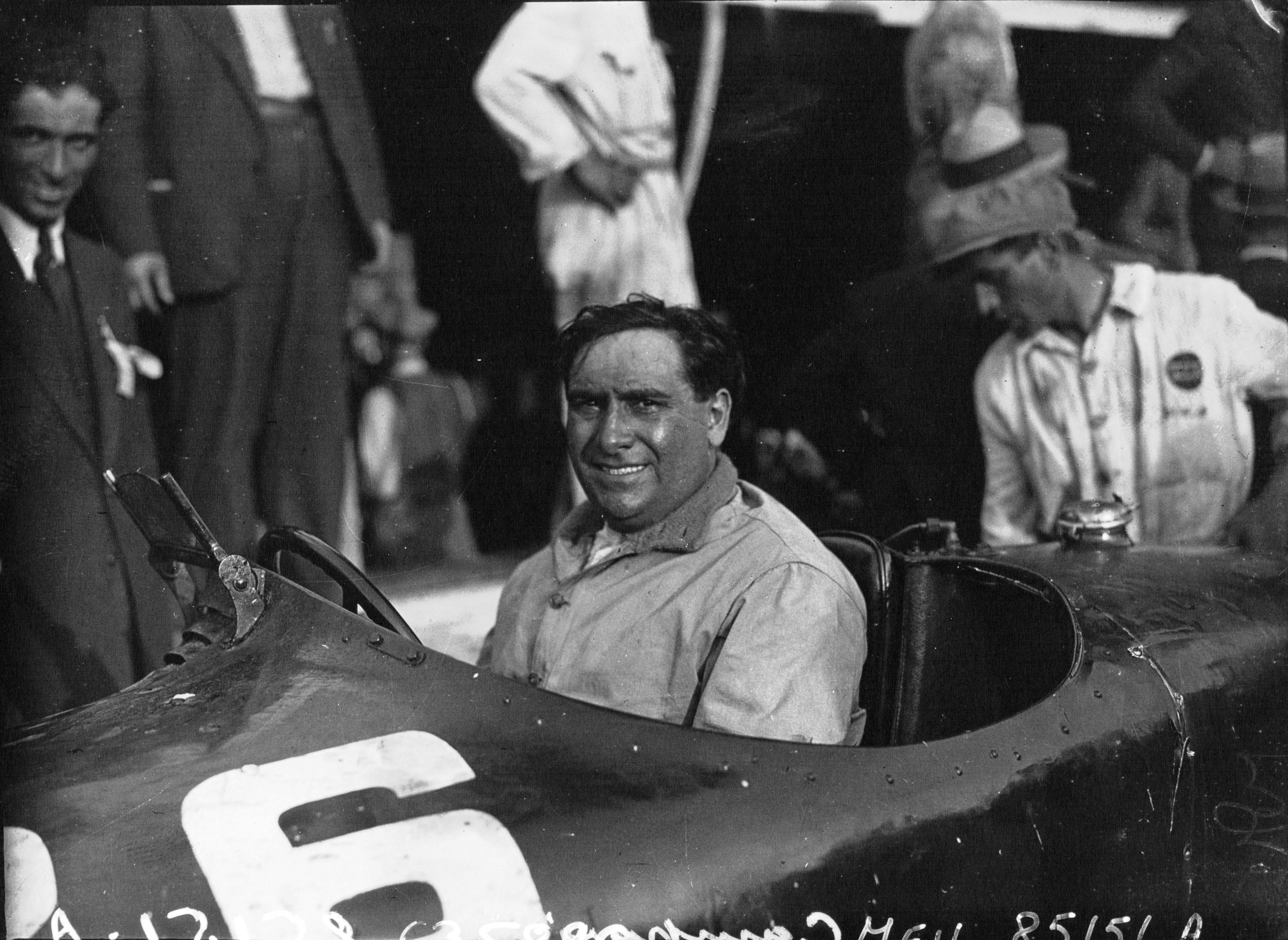
Giuseppe Campari, winner of the Italian GP

The new championship started at Monza with the Italian Grand Prix. Owing to the ten-hour format, the race had been rescheduled from its usual September date to May to avoid running into darkness. The Grand Prix had not been held since the tragic 1928 race when Emilio Materassi had crashed killing himself and 22 spectators. The banked-oval half of the circuit had been closed and the circuit upgraded, so this was the return to the full 10 km circuit. The ten-hour race also demanded two drivers for each car. With an open formula on the cars, there was a wide variety in the sixteen cars that arrived, led by the two works teams. Maserati, realising their 26M was no longer competitive against the new models from Bugatti and Alfa Romeo did not attend, choosing to do further development instead. Bugatti arrived with two of their new cars. Now race-proven, their lead drivers of Varzi/Chiron were paired together in one while the other went the second team of Divo/Bouriat. Privateers Jean-Pierre Wimille and Marcel Lehoux had also now received their new Type 51s, to augment the works team with co-drivers Jean Gaupillat and Philippe Étancelin as their respective co-drivers. Bugatti's rival, Alfa Romeo, had three cars entered: two of the 8C-2300 models for Campari/Arcangeli and Marinoni/Zehender while the new Tipo A bimotore was assigned to Nuvolari/Borzacchini. The Scuderia Ferrari owners Caniato/Tadini entered their 6C-1750 model and Francesco Pirola ran a 6C-1500 "voiturette" with racing journalist Conte "Johnny" Lurani. Two big Mercedes SSKs arrived, raced by Antonio Maino, and Boris Ivanowski. The Russian émigré had a hectic schedule for his car, with six major races in nine weeks which also included running it in the 24-hour races at Le Mans and Spa. The race was also the third round of the Italian driver's championship. Umberto Klinger and Luigi Castelbarco both had their Maseratis, while the Scuderia Materassi ran their 1920s-vintage Talbot 700s. The final arrival was Robert Sénéchal in his equally dated 1.5-litre Delage. Official practice was on Friday and Saturday. The Type A was found to be quite twitchy. While the teams were at Saturday lunch, Luigi Arcangeli took the car out for his first trial-runs. But after a sighting lap, he went off at speed at the Curva del Violone going onto the back straight, just as Ugo Sivocci had done in 1923 testing the new Alfa Romeo P1. Thrown from the car, he was killed instantly, with the car having apparently gone off the road at speed, side-swiping a tree and rolling several times. The Alfa Romeo team was ready to withdraw from the race until a telegram from Mussolini himself arrived that night, ordering them to race for Italian pride.

A sunny race-day did not see Maino's Mercedes or Castelbarco's Maserati on the grid. The Tipo A test-car had been prepared overnight by Alfa Romeo, who re-arranged their driver line-up: Marinoni was now paired up with Campari while reserve driver Minoia came in to drive with Zehender. At 8am, Air Force Marshal Italo Balbo waved the chequered flag to the 14 remaining starters. Campari shot into the lead but at the end of the first lap it was Varzi had passed him, ahead of Étancelin, Klinger and Ivanowski. With Divo and Sénéchal pitting early, the field soon split into distinct groups. Near the end of the first hour, after fifteen laps, Varzi had just lapped Nuvolari in fifth and held a one-minute lead over Campari with Lehoux and Minoia the only others on the lead lap. Surprisingly, only the Scuderia Ferrari Alfa had retired so far. In an effort to catch up, Campari set a new lap record on lap 24 but near the 2-hour mark, the Nuvolari/Borzacchini Alfa stopped on –track when one of its engines seized up. The Bugattis were having tyre problems though and when Varzi stopped, Campari took the lead. When he, in turn, pitted it was Nuvolari, not Marinoni, who took over the car. Similarly, Borzacchini subbed in for Zehender in the other Alfa. In the third hour, Chiron coasted into the pits to retire with a broken differential. This left Alfa Romeo running 1-2, a lap ahead of the privateer Bugatti of Lehoux and Maserati of Klinger, who moved up a spot when Lehoux's engine expired in the fourth hour.

By the halfway point, as predicted, the race has become a monotonous procession with only ten cars still running. The works Bugatti was having ongoing tyre-problems until changing over to the heavier-duty tyres used in the Targa Florio race. They were now third, three laps behind the leader. In the sixth hour, Varzi also drove the car for twenty laps. Campari passed 1000 km in just under 6½ hours. Klinger and Ghersi had an extended stop that dropped them from 4th to 8th. All the privateers were having various issues, all falling many laps behind. In the end, Sénéchal only drove five hours and would not be classified after changing three magnetos, not covering the 60% of the winner's distance. With a certain inevitability, the race continued to its conclusion. Campari and Nuvolari cruised home with a two-lap lead over their teammates with the works Bugatti coming third a lap further back. Wimille's Bugatti was seventeen laps behind the winner in fourth, while Klinger came out the pits at the end to be the last classified finisher in eighth. Because Ruggeri took over five minutes to complete his final lap, it was discounted and he was demoted to seventh behind Pirola’s Alfa on the same lap. With a 1-2 victory, breaking the Bugatti hold on Grand Prix wins, Alfa Romeo celebrated by giving their new car the “Monza” moniker.

After several false starts in the 1920s, a major race was finally held in Switzerland. Filed too late to the AIACR to be called the Swiss Grand Prix, it was instead run as the Geneva Grand Prix on a triangular town-to-town track to the west of the city, on the French border. As it was on the same weekend as the Rome Grand Prix, the Italian driver did not race. Nor did Chiron who, upon leaving his entry late, had travelled ahead leaving a mechanic to drive his Bugatti to the venue. When the tired mechanic crashed the car badly en route, he was left without a drive. The race was run as three heats, for the separate classes, leading to a 27-lap final. In the main-class heat, the Bugattis of Lehoux and Czaykowski were duelling closely. Lehoux had just lapped Klinger’s Maserati but when Czaykowski tried to pass the two collided. His car slewed off the road into a roadside house killing one and injuring two others. Czaykowski himself had a broken rib and bruised legs. Lehoux went on to win the final later in the day. Three other races were held on this busiest racing weekend of the year. Mercedes won two of the races – Caracciola the Eifelrennen at the Nürburgring, while Hans Stuck won the Lwów Grand Prix in Poland. Most attention though was on the Rome Grand Prix, this year held on a banked high-speed circuit around the airfield in the north of the city. Being the next round of the Italian championship, it drew a big field and, as before, was run as a series of heats with a 60-lap final. Only the Maserati works team arrived – led by Ernesto Maserati in the 4-litre V4, with Fagioli and Dreyfus in the 26M and Biondetti in the 2-litre 26B. Their main competition would be Varzi's Bugatti and Nuvolari running both his own Type 35C and a loaned 2.3-litre Type 35B. A shrewd move as his own car failed in the second heat. In the final, Varzi led from Maserati, Dreyfus and Fagioli. Nuvolari was out early with broken suspension and on the fifteenth lap, Varzi burst a tyre and lost time in the pits. He had driven hard back into third when his ignition broke. Despite Fagioli being delayed, Maserati was able to lead home his team to a 1-2-3 finish with Biondetti coming through for third.

The ACF promoted the French Grand Prix as the 25th edition. Although the first Grand Prix had been in 1906, there had only 17 races. However, the ACF included the inter-city races from 1895 to 1903 to add to their prestige. For the first Grand Prix's 25th anniversary, a special luncheon was held with the first two winners, Ferenc Szisz and Felice Nazzaro, as guests of honour. But it did provide one of the strongest entry lists for many years with all three works teams entered. The AIACR rules said the same driver combinations had to carry over for each race. Bugatti maintained their team. Alfa Romeo, after the enforced changes following Arcangeli's death, changed around their driver pairings again. Borzacchini now co-drove with Campari, with Nuvolari had Giovanni Minozzi and Minoia with Zehender, although this removed their co-drivers from the championship reckoning. Maserati had their new 2.8-litre Tipo 26M for Fagioli/Maserati. The other pairs, Dreyfus/Ghersi and Biondetti/Parenti had the older 2.5-litre. A strong privateer field was entered: Wimille and Lehoux in their Bugattis, Caracciola and Ivanowski had their 7-litre Mercedes – the first time German cars had raced at the Grand Prix since 1914. The race also attracted a significant British contingent; Earl Howe, having just won the Le Mans 24-hour the week before in his Alfa Romeo 8C-2300 tourer, now had a new Bugatti Type 51, while his victorious co-driver Tim Birkin ran a Maserati 26M. “Williams” ran his 2-litre Bugatti, William Scott had a 5-year old Delage and Jack Dunfee had a 1925 Sunbeam. All in all there were 23 starters. In practice Bugatti again found, as at Le Mans a week earlier, that their Michelin tyres were failing. They were going to withdraw but Williams still had a set of Dunlop tyres to test with. A full set of tyres was flown out overnight from England for the team and in gratitude gave “Williams” a third works car for the race, rejoining the team.

On the startline, Dunfee’s Sunbeam broke its universal joint. Fagioli's Maserati led the first lap from team-mate Dreyfus with the Bugattis of Chiron, “Williams”, Lehoux and Divo following. Chiron took the lead on the fourth lap and he and Fagioli continued swapping the lead for the next two hours. Around three hours the first refueling and driver-changes started. Varzi was able to build a half-lap lead over Maserati, with Ghersi close behind in formation. Minozzi's Alfa, and the Bugattis of Bouriat and Conelli were the only other cars remaining on the lead lap. In the fourth hour, Maserati started slipping back with brake issues while the problematic supercharger on Caracciola's Mercedes finally stopped the car out on the track. After five hours, the spectators were getting bored and wandered off for lunch. Despite seventeen cars still running, the long 12 km circuit spread them out to a monotonous procession. Chiron now had nearly a full lap's lead over Divo, with Dreyfus, “Williams” and the Alfas of Nuvolari and Minoia following. Campari was well down, five laps back, after persistent brake problems. The Bugattis benefitted from having a one-piece wheel and brake-drum unit which meant brakes could be changed at each pit stop in the same time as changing wheels, thereby avoiding such issues. This superior pitwork got the three works Bugattis into the top-three by the sixth hour. But in the 7th hour, the “Williams” car broke its universal joint and retired. The Dreyfus Maserati had severe brake problems, spending a long time in the pits and in the end had to pillage a spare from the now-retired Fagioli car. A similar ailment afflicted the Nuvolari Alfa soon after. The order settled down for the next few hours: Chiron and Varzi had a lap on Divo/Bouriat while the delays to others put Campari/Borzacchini into third albeit four laps further back. Next were the Maseratis of Birkin and Biondetti. In the final hour, Divo came to a stop on the track – the bolts on the engine had worked loose and he had no tools on board. Told to slow down by his pit, Varzi dropped his lap times by a minute to protect the car. Despite Campari putting in fast laps at the end, Varzi/Chiron still had a comfortable victory, completing exactly 100 laps, three laps ahead of the Alfa Romeo, with the Biondetti/Parenti Maserati third. Birkin/Eyston were the first privateers home in fourth, while the cars of Divo and Nuvolari, though not running at the end, had covered sufficient distance to be classified for points.

=== July ===
Two weeks later, the French drivers met again at the very fast Reims circuit for the Marne GP. The entry-list was dominated by Bugattis and the favourites included Chiron, Lehoux and a fit-again Czaykowski in their Type 51s. Lehoux's erstwhile co-driver, Philippe Étancelin, was now driving the first Alfa Romeo 8C ‘Monza’ in private hands and René Dreyfus entered for the Maserati works team. Chiron only lasted two laps, put out by gearbox failure, and it was Lehoux taking the lead and extending it over Dreyfus and Czaykowski and Étancelin. Which is how it stayed for the next two hours, with Lehoux setting the fastest lap at an average of nearly 150 km/h and winning by two minutes.

Just a week later was the third, and final, race in the new Championship: the Belgian Grand Prix run a week after the 24-hour sports-car race at the same circuit. The calculation was simple: Campari, with a first and a second, only needed to finish to be crowned the inaugural European Champion. Once again Maserati chose not to attend, nominally to better prepare for the upcoming (non-Championship) German Grand Prix. Only a dozen cars were entered with a two-way struggle between Bugatti an Alfa Romeo expected: after their failure at Monza, Bugatti had changed to Dunlop tyres, while Alfa Romeo had adjusted their rear-axle ratio to address the lack of speed shown at Montlhéry. Bugatti kept the same three pairings they used at Montlhéry, while Alfa Corse changed theirs again. This time put Zehender with Campari while Nuvolari and Borzacchini combined once more. Minozzi co-drove for Minoia, who was given the Targa Florio-styled version, with external fuel-tank and bucket seats. Tim Birkin entered his Alfa Romeo, converted to racing format from the touring style he had run at the 24-hour endurance the week before. Racing with Eyston at that event, he now teamed up with Brian Lewis, Baron Essendon, who himself has previously co-drove with Earl Howe at Montlhéry. French privateer Jean Pesato had his smaller 1.75-litre Alfa and Jean-Pierre Wimille was in his Type 51. The final entrants were Ivanowski's Mercedes and the Montier father and son with their Ford Specials.

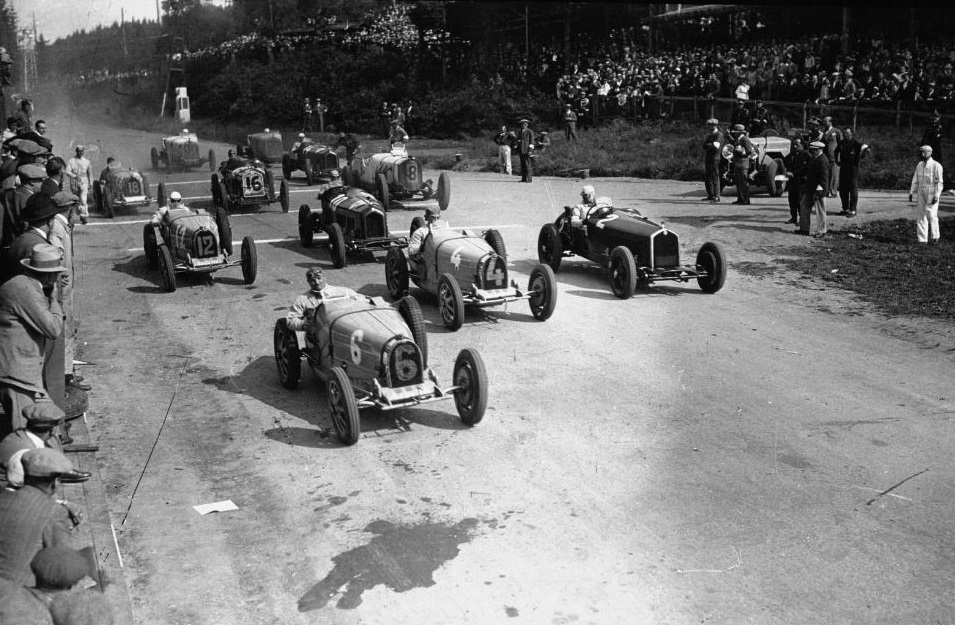
Divo and Williams (Bugattis) and Minoia (Alfa Romeo) lead away the field at the Belgian GP

Grand Prix cars had last raced at Spa in 1925 and Varzi beat the lap record on the first lap from a standing start. Immediately the rivalry between Varzi and Nuvolari started with the lead changing back and forth. After one hour (nine laps) the two were still nose-to-tail, with “Williams” further back in third, followed by Minoia, Wimille, Divo, Birkin and Campari driving a conservative race and Ivanowski. Already Pesato and the Montiers were falling well behind. As expected, the cars made their first pit-stops in the third hour with only Chiron, Borzacchini and Conelli now on the lead lap. During his stint, Chiron put in faster and faster laps to start building a lead over the Alfa. Just after the sixth hour, when the second changes were expected, great drama occurred. Coming down to La Source hairpin, Campari's car suddenly burst into flames. Despite the driver's attempts to put it out the fire destroyed the car – the early DNF would cost Campari 6 championship points. Around a similar time, Chiron pulled off the track to repair the engine magneto. Although able to get going again, he would not get much further as the camshaft was broken.

This now left Nuvolari/Borzacchini with a 9 km (4-minute) lead over “Williams”/Conelli, with Minoia and Divo both two laps back. Then, when Divo/Bouriat retired in the 7th hour with a broken differential, this moved Birkin’s Alfa Romeo up to fourth, running four laps behind. Going into the last hour, Conelli pitted for a very fast refuel and brake-change. “Williams” went out and put in very fast laps, gaining on the Alfa Romeo at a rate of around ten seconds a lap. When Borzacchini came into the pits with a misfire complaining of fuel-feed problems, the Bugatti took the lead. After several stops, Nuvolari did some repairs then jumped in and took off with a misfire, now a lap behind. Although he caught and passed the Bugatti, time had run out. “Williams” took the flag by three-quarters of a lap, the Bugatti having spent only five minutes in the pits. Minoia/Minozzi were three laps behind, with Birkin’s Alfa fourth and Ivanowski's Mercedes in fifth a dozen laps behind the winner. Minoia's third place put him on equal points as Campari after the latter's early retirement, and having finished all three races, he won the tie-break by having covered just over 560 km further. Now a 47-year old veteran, Minoia had started racing in the 1907 Targa Florio and won the inaugural Mille Miglia. He became the first European Driver's Champion.

The fifth German Grand Prix was held at the Nürburgring, using only the longer Nordschleife track for the first time. A big field of 31 starters took part in two classes: the cyclecars and voiturettes up to 1100cc would run 18 laps while the main class did 22 laps. Although there was no works team, Mercedes-Benz was well represented in their home Grand Prix with six cars, led by Rudolf Caracciola along with Hans Stuck and up-and-coming Manfred von Brauchitsch. The Bugatti team arrived in force with four cars, for Varzi, Chiron, Divo and Bouriat. There was also the German Bugatti Team with two cars – a Type 51 for von Morgen and an older 35B for Burggaller. Lehoux, Wimille and Earl Howe also arrived with their Type 51s. Maserati, having missed the Belgian GP, had four cars entered although only two arrived – for Fagioli and Dreyfus. Alfa Romeo were to be represented by the Scuderia Ferrari, but Borzacchini did not arrive so Nuvolari was their sole starter. The other notable entry was that of American driver Phil “Red” Shafer who bought his own Shafer Special, a 2-seat racecar with a 4.3-litre Buick engine.

A huge crowd of over 100,000 arrived in drizzle for the 10am start. “Williams” had taken over Divo’s Bugatti and his own car was scratched. The big Mercedes were at the front of the grid while the Bugatti works team were all stuck in the middle with Nuvolari and Wimille at the back. Caracciola led Fagioli, von Morgen and Varzi at the end of the first lap, but by the end of the second lap Nuvolari had got up to fourth. After an hour, and five laps, Caracciola had a 1-minute lead over Nuvolari and Fagioli. On the 12th lap most of the cars (aside Nuvolari and von Morgen) pitted for refuelling as the rain gradually eased. Chiron had sped up as the track dried and passed Nuvolari but was still two minutes behind Caracciola. The rough, undulating track was damaging suspensions and cause oil leaks and a number of drivers (including “Williams”, Fagioli, Shafer and Dreyfus) retired with damaged engines or gearboxes for lack of oil in them. Although Chiron was steadily catching Caracciola, the German was able to manage his tyres well and held on to win by just over a minute. Varzi put in the fastest lap of the race to overtake von Morgen for third, who was losing oil pressure and retired on the last lap. This was the first motor-race to be broadcast over radio, with four commentators stationed at key corners reporting in via telephone.

=== Italy in August ===
While the German drivers were at the Avusrennen, most of the rest of Europe's top drivers were at the Coppa Ciano at the end of a week-long festival of racing on the coast at Livorno. It was another close race between Bugatti, Alfa Romeo and Maserati, and with a combined field with the voiturettes there were over 40 starters, started in threes at 1-minute intervals. Nuvolari, racing for the Scuderia Ferrari, took the lead initially and after his nearest rivals Fagioli and Varzi had early issues, was able to build a strong lead. Late in the race, Chiron pressed hard and Nuvolari had a small excursion on the hilly roads that made him drop his pace. But despite Chiron completing the race first, it was Nuvolari's victory on elapsed time.

A fortnight later, the circus re-convened for the Coppa Acerbo on the long, fast Pescara circuit. Many of the French drivers were at the Saint-Gaudens race in southern France, but a quality field was entered for the penultimate round of the Italian Championship. The long straights favoured the big bimotore with Nuvolari and Campari driving the Alfa Romeo Tipo A (under Scuderia Ferrari) and Maserati in his V4. Varzi and Chiron were again nominally independents but had Bugatti factory support. Campari led the start from Fagioli, Nuvolari and Varzi. But once again, as at AVUS the hot temperatures and very high speeds played havoc with the tyres. Maserati, Fagioli and Varzi were delayed with delamination issues. Nuvolari pursued Campari and took the lead only for the pace to blow a gasket on one of his engines and overheat it. Campari drove more cautiously and took the victory from Chiron with Nuvolari's crippled Alfa third. The championship culminated at the Monza Grand Prix. The race format was a 14-lap heat for each of the three classes with the top finishers of those racing off in a 35-lap final. The works teams arrived with full sets of their new cars for the fast track: Alfa Romeo had the biggest presence with top drivers Nuvolari and Campari in the Tipo A in the over 3-litre class, while Minoia, Borzacchini and Minozzi had the “Monza” Grand Prix car in the middle-class. Bugatti had Varzi and Chiron in the 5-litre Type 54. While Ernesto Maserati raced the big V4, teammates Fagioli and Dreyfus now both had the 2.8-litre 8C with Ruggeri in the older 26M, looking for a win in the 2-litre class. He was up against a field of Bugatti Type 35s and Alfa Romeo 6Cs. Marcel Lehoux was the only driver in a Bugatti Type 51 and “Phi-Phi” Étancelin had his Alfa Romeo ‘Monza’. Ruggeri won the first heat, in the 2-litre class, for Maserati beating the Bugattis of Castelbarco and Czaykowski. Maserati was triumphant again in the second heat (for 3-litre cars) with Fagioli and Dreyfus leading home Minoia and Lehoux. Perhaps surprisingly, it was Nuvolari's Alfa Romeo, and not the Bugattis, that had tyre problems in the third heat, with Varzi and Chiron leading home the Italians. Finally, there was an open repêchage race for those cars finishing 5th – 8th in each heat. In the end only four cars chose to enter, but tragedy struck near the end of the race when Étancelin went off the track at the Lesmo corner into spectators standing in an illegal area. Two were killed and fourteen wounded; Étancelin himself of only slightly injured. Borzacchini, Minozzi and Ghersi qualified. The four qualifiers from the 2-litre heat, knowing they would be outclassed, all chose not to contest the final. In the slipstreaming battle, the lead changed several times in the early part of the race. Nuvolari retired with blown piston and by the tenth lap, Fagioli, Varzi, Dreyfus and Chiron had established a gap. Nuvolari called Minoia, the newly crowned European Champion, in to take over his car. The Bugattis had a bad race: Varzi had to pit twice for a successive tyre failures, and tyre debris severed one of Chiron's brake cables. Although Dreyfus also suffered engine issues, Fagioli continued on untroubled to take the win, a minute ahead of Borzacchini. Varzi recovered to take third while the Nuvolari/Minoia car was fourth. The victory put Varzi, Nuvolari, Campari and Fagioli all on equal points in the championship. The RACI decreed that Nuvolari and Campari had precedence as they had won the major races – Nuvolari won the Targa Florio and together they had won the Italian GP. In the end, they awarded the championship to Campari.

=== The end of the season ===
The last major event of the year was the second Masaryk Circuit, held on the long road circuit west of the city of Brno. With the other national events completed, it was able to attract most of the top European drivers and teams. Maserati and Fagioli ran their 8C cars; Alfa Romeo drivers Nuvolari, Borzacchini and Siena raced for the Scuderia Ferrari while Varzi, Chiron and Lehoux had their own Bugattis. Caracciola and Stuck also ran as privateers, although had notable factory support from Mercedes-Benz. A big crowd arrived on a cold Sunday morning for the race, started by former driver Eliška Junková. As a memorial to her husband, killed in 1928 at the German GP, the would be a special prize to the fastest driver on the seventh lap. From the start, Fagioli burst into the lead, but on the second lap he hit a wooden pedestrian bridge support collapsing it and blocking the road. Somehow Borzacchini, Lehoux and Chiron were able to squeeze past but Nuvolari, Varzi and Caracciola could not avoid the wreckage, damaging their own cars. Varzi pitted to change three wheels, and also dropped off Nuvolari who had hitched a ride back with him.

Racing was strong again in Europe, with most of the major races easily attracting well over 100,000 spectators, despite the hard economic climate. There was a diversity of cars and the different manufacturers were well-matched and provided exciting racing with variety of personalities for the crowds to rally behind, as their favourites. It was apparent the power base for motor-racing was in Italy. Throughout the season, many of the major races also ran a voiturette race before or alongside them. Usually for cars up to 1.1 or 1.5-litre engines, they were well-supported with good sized fields. The most consistent performer was Frenchman José Scaron, in his 1.1-litre supercharged Amilcar. He won the Italian Voiturette Grand Prix (held with the Monza GP) and at Casablanca, and placed at the German and Tunis Grands Prix and was often racing against driver in their 1.5-litre supercharged Bugatti Type 37As. Overall it had been a very positive year for Mercedes. With the depressed German economy, there was no sponsorship money available from fuel or automotive companies and managing director Wilhelm Kissel had closed the works racing team at the end of 1930 following the wishes of his board. However, development on the SSK produced the new lightweight model, and Kissel was able to provide works assistance to his best driver, Rudolf Caracciola, nominally running as a privateer. With the SSKL, he became the first foreigner to win the Mille Miglia after the two favourites, Nuvolari and Varzi, both had early issues. Caracciola also won the three major German races in the year – the Avusrennen, Eifelrennen and national Grand Prix and retained the European Mountain Championship. According to Alfred Neubauer, his prizemoney came to RM180,000, when a Mercedes machinist earned RM2500 annually. And to cap it all, Mercedes won the Spa 24-hours and was second in the Le Mans 24 hour sports-car races. This boded well for the German manufacturer’s future.

== Championship final standings ==
Pos	Driver	Team	ITA (Italy)	FRA (France)	BEL (Belgium)	Pts	Total km
1	(Italy) Ferdinando Minoia	Alfa Corse	2	6	**3**	9	3935.3
2	(Italy) Giuseppe Campari	Alfa Corse	1	2	Ret	9	3368.9
*	(Italy) Baconin Borzacchini	Alfa Corse	Ret / [2]	[2]*	2	[11]*	2834.1
3	(France) Albert Divo	Usines Bugatti	3	7	Ret	12	3410.3
3	(France) Guy Bouriat	Usines Bugatti	3	7	Ret	12	3410.3
4	(Italy) Tazio Nuvolari	Alfa Corse	Ret / [1]	Ret	2	13	2689.0
5	(Italy) Achille Varzi	Usines Bugatti	Ret / [3]	1	Ret	13	2353.6
5	(Monaco) Louis Chiron	Usines Bugatti	Ret	1	Ret	13	2353.6
6	(France) Jean-Pierre Wimille	Private Entry	4	Ret	Ret	14	3242.6
6	(France) Jean Gaupillat	Private Entry	4	Ret	Ret	14	3242.6
7	(United Kingdom) William Grover-Williams	Usines Bugatti		Ret	1	14	2137.5
7	(Italy) Caberto Conelli	Usines Bugatti		Ret	1	14	2137.5
8	(Russia) / (France) Boris Ivanowski	Private Entry	5	Ret	5	15	2740.3
8	(France) Henri Stoffel	Private Entry	5	Ret	5	15	2740.3
*	(Italy) Giovanni Minozzi	Alfa Corse		[Ret]*	[**3**]*	[15]*	2324.0
9	(United Kingdom) Henry Birkin	Private Entry		4	4	16	2425.8
*	(United Kingdom) Baron Essendon	Private Entry		Ret	[4]*	[16]*	2215.9
10	(France) Jean Pesato	Private Entry		10	6	16	2144.5
10	(France) Pierre Félix	Private Entry		10	6	16	2144.5
*	(Italy) Pietro Ghersi	Officine Alfieri Maserati	[8]*	8		[17]*	2248.3
11	(France) Robert Sénéchal	Private Entry	**NC**	5		17	1952.5
11	(France) Henri Frètet	Private Entry	**NC**	5		17	1952.5
*	(Italy) Goffredo Zehender	Alfa Corse	DNS	6	[Ret]*	[18]*	1722.2
12	(Italy) Clemente Biondetti	Officine Alfieri Maserati		3		19	1187.5
12	(Italy) Luigi Parenti	Officine Alfieri Maserati		3		19	1187.5
13	(Italy) Francesco Pirola	Private Entry	6			20	1300.0
13	(Italy) Giovanni Lurani	Private Entry	6			20	1300.0
14	(Italy) Amadeo Ruggeri	Scuderia Materassi	7			20	1290.5
14	(Italy) Renato Balestrero	Scuderia Materassi	7			20	1290.5
15	(United Kingdom) George Eyston	Private Entry		4		20	1185.8
16	(France) René Dreyfus	Officine Alfieri Maserati		8		20	1108.3
17	(France) René Ferrand	Private Entry		9		20	1070.5
17	(France) Louis Rigal	Private Entry		9		20	1070.5
18	(United Kingdom) Earl Howe	Private Entry		Ret		20	975.9
19	(Italy) Umberto Klinger	Private Entry	8			21	1140.0
20	(Italy) Roberto di Vecchio	Private Entry	Ret			21	870.0
20	(Italy) Gerolamo Ferrari	Private Entry	Ret			21	870.0
21	(France) Charles Montier	Private Entry			7	21	864.2
21	(France) . Ducolombier	Private Entry			7	21	864.2
22	(France) Ferdinand Montier	Private Entry			Ret	21	835.2
23	(Italy) Emilio Eminente	Private Entry		Ret		21	741.9
23	(France) Edmond Bourlier	Private Entry		Ret		21	741.9
24	(France) Georges d'Arnoux	Private Entry		Ret		21	729.0
24	(France) Max Fourny	Private Entry		Ret		21	729.0
25	(French Algeria) Marcel Lehoux	Private Entry	Ret	Ret		21	678.3
25	(France) Philippe Étancelin	Private Entry	Ret	Ret		21	678.3
26	(Italy) Enzo Grimaldi	Private Entry		Ret		22	616.4
26	(Italy) . Borgiat	Private Entry		Ret		22	616.4
27	(Italy) Luigi Fagioli	Officine Alfieri Maserati		Ret		22	566.5
27	(Italy) Ernesto Maserati	Officine Alfieri Maserati		Ret		22	566.5
28	(Germany) Rudolf Caracciola	Private Entry		Ret		22	490.8
28	(Germany) Otto Merz	Private Entry		Ret		22	490.8
29	(United Kingdom) William Scott	Private Entry		**Ret**		23	276.8
29	(United Kingdom) Sydenham Armstrong-Payne	Private Entry		**Ret**		23	276.8
30	(Italy) Alfredo Caniato	Scuderia Ferrari	Ret			23	150.0
30	(Italy) Mario Tadini	Scuderia Ferrari	Ret			23	150.0
31=	(Italy) Attilio Marinoni	Alfa Corse	DNS			23	0
31=	(United Kingdom) Jack Dunfee	Private Entry		Ret		23	0
31=	(United Kingdom) . Appleyard	Private Entry		Ret		23	0
Pos	Driver	Team	ITA (Italy)	FRA (France)	BEL (Belgium)	Pts	Total km

Colour	Result	Points
Gold	Winner	1
Silver	2nd place	2
Bronze	3rd place	3
Green	Completed more than 75%	4
Blue	Completed between 50% and 75%	5
Purple	Completed between 25% and 50%	6
Red	Completed less than 25%	7
Black	Disqualified	8
Blank	Did not participate	8

Note: *Not racing with his designated co-driver, therefore AIACR rules excluded him from the Championship standings

Bold font indicates starting on pole position, while italics show the driver of the race's fastest lap.

Source: Information for 1st to 7th drivers originates from 1931 AUTOMOBIL-REVUE, while data for drivers 8 to 30 was compiled in 2008.

== Results of the other major races ==
Pos	Driver	Team	TUN (Tunisia)	MON (Monaco)	ALS (Italy)	TGF (Italy)	ROM (Italy)	MAR (France)	GER (Germany)	CCN (Italy)	CAC (Italy)	MNZ (Italy)	MSK (Czechoslovakia)
	(Monaco) Louis Chiron	Automobiles Ettore Bugatti; Private Entry		1				Ret	2	2	2	7	1
	(Italy) Achille Varzi	Automobiles Ettore Bugatti; Private Entry	1	3	1	3	Ret		3	5	4	3	Ret
	(Italy) Tazio Nuvolari	Alfa Corse; Scuderia Ferrari			Ret	1	Ret		4	1	3	Ret [4]	Ret
	(Italy) Luigi Fagioli	Officine Alfieri Maserati	2	2	Ret [7]	Ret	6		Ret	3	5	1	Ret [Ret]
	(French Algeria) Marcel Lehoux	Private Entry	3	Ret				1	Ret			6	Ret
	(Italy) Giuseppe Campari	Alfa Corse; Scuderia Ferrari				4				4	1	DNQ	
	(Italy) Ernesto Maserati	Officine Alfieri Maserati	8				1				Ret	DNQ	Ret
	(Germany) Rudolf Caracciola	Private Entry		Ret					1				Ret
	(Italy) Baconin Borzacchini	Alfa Corse; Scuderia Ferrari				2				Ret	Ret	2	Ret
	(France) René Dreyfus	Officine Alfieri Maserati	Ret	Ret	Ret	Ret	2	2	Ret		Ret	Ret	
	(Italy) Giovanni Minozzi	Private Entry; Alfa Corse			2		Ret			Ret		5	
	(Germany) Hans Stuck	Private Entry							6				2
	(Germany) Heinrich-Joachim von Morgen	Deutsches Bugatti Team	5	Ret	3				Ret				3
	(Italy) Clemente Biondetti	Officine Alfieri Maserati	4	7		Ret	3			Ret	Ret	DNQ	
	(Poland) / (France) Stanisław Czaykowski	Private Entry	6	9				3				DNQ	
	(France) René Dreyfus	Officine Alfieri Maserati		4					7				
	(Italy) Renato Balestrero	Private Entry					4			Res	8	DNQ	
	(Italy) Luigi Castelbarco	Private Entry	Ret		4		Ret			9		DNQ	
	(France) Philippe Étancelin	Private Entry	Ret	Ret				4				DNQ	
	(Italy) Ferdinando Minoia	Alfa Corse										4	
	(Czechoslovakia) "Hýta" (Jiři Lobkowicz)	Private Entry											4
	(Italy) Goffredo Zehender	Scuderia Ferrari; Alfa Corse		5		[6]							
	(Italy) Luigi Arcangeli	Scuderia Ferrari; Alfa Corse			5	6	[†]						
	(Italy) Guido d'Ippolito	Alfa Corse; Scuderia Ferrari				5				7			
	(Italy) Domenico Cerami	Private Entry			Ret		5			Ret		DNQ	
	(France) Jean de Maleplane	Private Entry						5					
	(Germany) Otto Merz	Private Entry							5				
	(Germany) Hermann, Prinz zu Leiningen	Deutsches Bugatti Team		Ret	Ret								5
	(Italy) Francesco Severi	Scuderia Ferrari			10					Ret	6		
	(France) André Boillot	Private Entry		6									
	(Germany) Ernst-Günther von Burggaller	Deutsches Bugatti Team		Ret	6				Ret				
	(France) Aristide Lumachi	Private Entry						6					
	(Italy) Franco Cortese	Scuderia Ferrari								6			
	(Hungary) / (United Kingdom) Theodor Zichy	Private Entry											6
Pos	Driver	Team	TUN (Tunisia)	MON (Monaco)	ALS (Italy)	TGF (Italy)	ROM (Italy)	MAR (France)	GER (Germany)	CCN (Italy)	CAC (Italy)	MNZ (Italy)	MSK (Czechoslovakia)

italics show the driver of the race's fastest lap.
Only those drivers with a best finish of 6th or better, or a fastest lap, are shown. Sources:

== Footnotes ==
Citations
