= Ain-Diab Circuit =

Motorsport venue in Morocco

- Grand Prix Circuit (1957–1958)
- Location: Ain-Diab, Casablanca-Settat, Morocco
- Coordinates: 33°34′43″N 7°41′15″W
- Opened: 1957
- Closed: 1958
- Major events: Formula One; Moroccan Grand Prix (1958)

Grand Prix Circuit (1957–1958)
- Length: 7.603 km (4.724 mi)
- Turns: 18
- Race lap record: 2:22.5 ( (United Kingdom) Stirling Moss, Vanwall VW 5, 1958, F1)

The Ain-Diab Circuit (Arabic: دارة عين الذئاب, romanized: Dārat A'ayn a-Thia'āb) was a Formula One road circuit built in 1957, southwest of Ain-Diab in Morocco, using the existing coast road and the main road from Casablanca to Azemmour that ran through the Sidi Abderrahman forest. Prior to 1957, the Anfa Circuit and the Agadir circuit were used for the Moroccan Grand Prix.

The 4.724 mi (7.603 km) course was designed by the Royal Automobile Club of Morocco and given a full blessing from Sultan Mohammed V. It took six weeks to construct. The site hosted a non-championship F1 race in 1957. On 19 October 1958 the course was the venue for the 1958 Moroccan Grand Prix, the final round in the 1958 Formula One season. It was won by Stirling Moss driving a Vanwall, completing the 53 laps in 2h 09m 15.1s. Mike Hawthorn driving a Ferrari 246 finished second and in doing so became the first British Formula One World Champion.

During the race, the engine on the Vanwall of Stuart Lewis-Evans seized and the car spun and crashed. He was fatally burned, dying in hospital in England eight days later.
