= Charles Bénitah =

Moroccan fencer (1907–1987)

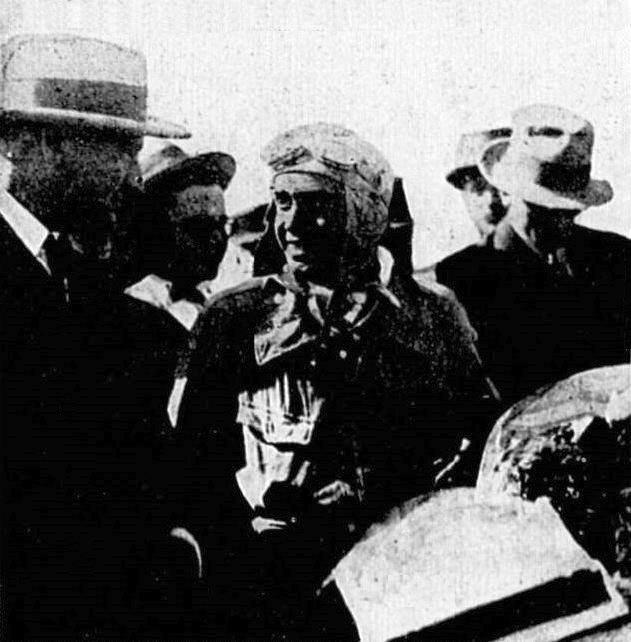
- Benitah winning the 1930 Grand Prix in Morocco

Personal information
- Born: March 16, 1907 Casablanca, Morocco
- Died: 1987 (aged 79–80) Casablanca, Morocco

Sport
- Sport: Fencing, auto racing, hockey, track and field, tennis

Achievements and titles
- Olympic finals: Rome 1960
- National finals: Winner 1930 Moroccan Grand Prix

Charles Bénitah (16 March 1907 – 1987) was a Moroccan Olympic fencer, automobile racer, pilot and all-around sportsman. He was born and died in Casablanca. He competed in the team épée event at the 1960 Summer Olympics.

== Athletic career ==
In 1926, Bénitah was the Moroccan junior fencing champion for all categories as well as the Moroccan champion in the 400 meters. He also set a national record for the 300 meters, running it in 37 seconds. In 1928 he became the Moroccan senior fencing champion in all disciplines. Bénitah won the 1930 Anfa Grand Prix with an Amilcar Cyclecar and played on the Racing Hockey Club from 1923 through 1930.
