= Ain Diab =

Neighborhood in Casablanca, Morocco

Coordinates: 33.5895°N 7.6741°W

The ribat on the island of Sidi Abderrahman in Ain Diab.

Ain Diab (Arabic: عين الذئاب, romanized: a'ayn a-thia'āb) is a neighborhood located at the Corniche of Casablanca, Morocco. The neighborhood is affluent and famous for the fashionable stretch of coastline known as the Corniche. There are numerous hotels, restaurants, nightclubs, and Lalla Meryem Beach and Ain Diab Beach. There is also the ribat and island of Sidi Abderrahman, which is now connected to the mainland by bridge.

Ain Diab hosted a round of the Formula One World Championship in 1958. Amongst the notable residents is the British-born writer Tahir Shah.

The first McDonald's franchise in Africa and in the Arab world opened on Ain Diab in 1992.

== See also ==
- Ain-Diab Circuit
