= 1958 Moroccan Grand Prix =

← Previous race	Next race →

Race details
- Date: 19 October 1958
- Official name: VII Grand Prix International Automobile du Maroc
- Location: Ain-Diab Circuit; Casablanca
- Course: Road-based with permanent infrastructure
- Course length: 7.618 km (4.734 miles)
- Distance: 53 laps, 403.754 km (250.902 miles)
- Weather: Warm, dry, sunny

Pole position
Driver	(United Kingdom) Mike Hawthorn	Ferrari
- Time: 2:23.1

Fastest lap
Driver	(United Kingdom) Stirling Moss	Vanwall
- Time: 2:22.5 on lap 21

Podium
First	(United Kingdom) Stirling Moss	Vanwall
Second	(United Kingdom) Mike Hawthorn	Ferrari
Third	(United States) Phil Hill	Ferrari

The 1958 Moroccan Grand Prix, formally the VII Grand Prix International Automobile du Maroc, was a Formula One motor race held at Ain-Diab Circuit, Casablanca on 19 October 1958, after a six-week break following the Italian Grand Prix. It was race 11 of 11 in the 1958 World Championship of Drivers and race 10 of 10 in the 1958 International Cup for Formula One Manufacturers. It is the only time Morocco has hosted a World Championship Grand Prix.

Mike Hawthorn (Ferrari) started from pole position, but Stirling Moss won the race driving for Vanwall. Hawthorn finished second which secured him the World Drivers' Championship. Phil Hill was third, also for Ferrari. Vanwall made sure of the World Constructors' Championship and both this and Hawthorn's drivers' title were firsts for British teams or drivers. On 21 October 1958, Hawthorn retired from the sport after winning the title, but died after a road accident.

The race saw an accident involving Stuart Lewis-Evans, who died six days later from the burns he sustained.

== Report ==
=== Background ===
Both Mike Hawthorn and Stirling Moss came into the race with a chance of becoming World Drivers' Champion. Moss, on 32 points, needed to win the race and set fastest lap, with Hawthorn (40 pts) finishing no higher than third or to win without fastest lap with Hawthorn again finishing third or lower but also without fastest lap.

=== Practice and qualifying ===
There was an entry of 25 cars, of which 19 were to Formula One (F1) specification. Ferrari and Vanwall entered three cars each, BRM four and Lotus and Cooper two each. There were a further five non-works F1 entries. Six Formula Two Coopers brought the total entry to 25.

In Friday practice, Jean Behra (BRM) set fastest time at 2:25.2. Tony Brooks (Vanwall) and Hawthorn (Ferrari) were second and third, four and five tenths behind respectively. Moss did not better 2:26, despite a late attempt, having been hampered by other cars during some of his fast lap attempts.

On the Saturday, Hawthorn set fastest time with 2:23.1 which was one-tenth ahead of Moss who was content with his position in the middle of the front row on the three-then-two grid. Stuart Lewis-Evans was on his outside, a further half-a-second behind. The second row was made up of Phil Hill (Ferrari) and Behra.

=== Race ===
Moss and Lewis-Evans led away, with Phil Hill also making a good start from the second row. At the end of the first lap, Moss led from Hill and Hawthorn was third followed by Jo Bonnier, Brooks, Lewis-Evans and Behra. On lap three, Hill tried to out-brake Moss, but failed, and left the track without damaging the car, allowing Hawthorn and Bonnier to pass. Moss, now unhampered, began to draw away from Hawthorn who was being caught by Hill who had passed Bonnier after recovering from the earlier incident. By lap eight, Hill had passed Hawthorn but had little hope of catching Moss, who was already lapping the Formula Two cars at the rear of the field. Moss's teammate, Brooks, chased down Bonnier for fourth place and subsequently passed Hawthorn for third on lap 17. On lap 18 Moss was involved in a minor collision with the Maserati of Wolfgang Seidel which forced the latter to retire and Moss to be wary of engine temperature thereafter.

At 25 laps, Moss led Hill by 20s with Brooks a further 42s behind. Hawthorn was fourth followed by Bonnier and Olivier Gendebien with Lewis-Evans, Behra, Masten Gregory and Harry Schell completing the first ten runners. Hawthorn re-passed Brooks shortly afterwards and on lap 30 Brooks's engine blew and he retired. This left Hawthorn in third place, but some distance behind Hill, who was 27s behind Moss and steadily losing ground on the leader.

At this point, Gendebien, Tom Bridger and François Picard all retired through accidents, with only the latter sustaining more than minor injuries. Hill had little hope of catching Moss and the Ferrari team signalled to him to allow Hawthorn to catch up and take the second position needed to claim the Drivers' Championship. Hill's lead over Hawthorn was such that it took till lap 39 for the change to occur. Shortly afterwards, Moss lapped Schell, who then attempted to stay close to the Vanwall hampering Moss's progress. On lap 41, Lewis-Evans's engine broke in a corner, sending him off the road where the car caught fire. The driver was able to extricate himself but was badly burned.

At 48 laps, Moss slowed to allow Schell to move back ahead and thus avoid the possibility of further interference with his own race. Such was the lead that Moss had at this stage that he was still able to finish nearly 1.5 minutes ahead of the Ferraris of Hawthorn and Hill. Moss had also set fastest lap, but Hawthorn's second place was enough to secure him the World Drivers' Championship.

=== Post race ===
Lewis-Evans was airlifted back to Britain by Vanwall team owner Tony Vandervell but died as a result of his burns six days later. Vandervell, already in failing health himself, ended his involvement with the Vanwall team partly as a result of the accident. Lewis-Evans was also a close friend of Bernie Ecclestone, who was at the race. Following his death Ecclestone sold his Connaught team and cars and ceased involvement with the sport till 1965.

It was also the last race for Hawthorn who retired as a driver shortly after the season ended. He was killed in a road accident in Surrey on 22 January 1959.

Picard ultimately recovered from his injuries after six months of incapacity, but did not race again.

== Classification ==
- A yellow background denotes a Formula Two entry:

=== Qualifying ===
Pos	No	Driver	Constructor	Time	Gap
1	6	(United Kingdom) Mike Hawthorn	Ferrari	2:23.1	—
2	8	(United Kingdom) Stirling Moss	Vanwall	2:23.2	+0.1
3	12	(United Kingdom) Stuart Lewis-Evans	Vanwall	2:23.7	+0.6
4	14	(France) Jean Behra	BRM	2:23.8	+0.7
5	4	(United States) Phil Hill	Ferrari	2:24.1	+1.0
6	2	(Belgium) Olivier Gendebien	Ferrari	2:24.3	+1.2
7	10	(United Kingdom) Tony Brooks	Vanwall	2:24.4	+1.3
8	18	(Sweden) Jo Bonnier	BRM	2:24.9	+1.8
9	38	(France) Maurice Trintignant	Cooper-Climax	2:26.0	+2.9
10	16	(United States) Harry Schell	BRM	2:26.4	+3.3
11	32	(United Kingdom) Jack Fairman	Cooper-Climax	2:27.0	+3.9
12	36	(United Kingdom) Graham Hill	Lotus-Climax	2:27.1	+4.0
13	22	(United States) Masten Gregory	Maserati	2:27.6	+4.5
14	30	(United Kingdom) Roy Salvadori	Cooper-Climax	2:28.6	+5.5
15	20	(United Kingdom) Ron Flockhart	BRM	2:29.8	+6.7
16	34	(United Kingdom) Cliff Allison	Lotus-Climax	2:33.7	+10.6
17	28	(Italy) Gerino Gerini	Maserati	2:35.1	+12.0
18	24	(West Germany) Hans Herrmann	Maserati	2:35.1	+12.0
19	50	(Australia) Jack Brabham	Cooper-Climax	2:36.6	+13.5
20	26	(West Germany) Wolfgang Seidel	Maserati	2:38.2	+15.1
21	52	(New Zealand) Bruce McLaren	Cooper-Climax	2:41.7	+18.6
22	56	(United Kingdom) Tom Bridger	Cooper-Climax	2:42.5	+19.4
23	58	(Morocco) Robert La Caze	Cooper-Climax	2:43.1	+20.0
24	54	(France) François Picard	Cooper-Climax	2:46.4	+23.3
25	60	(France) André Guelfi	Cooper-Climax	2:47.8	+24.7

=== Race ===
Pos	No	Driver	Constructor	Laps	Time/Retired	Grid	Points
1	8	(United Kingdom) Stirling Moss	Vanwall	53	2:09:15.1	2	9^{1}
2	6	(United Kingdom) Mike Hawthorn	Ferrari	53	+1:24.7	1	6
3	4	(United States) Phil Hill	Ferrari	53	+1:25.5	5	4
4	18	(Sweden) Jo Bonnier	BRM	53	+1:46.7	8	3
5	16	(United States) Harry Schell	BRM	53	+2:33.7	10	2
6	22	(United States) Masten Gregory	Maserati	52	+1 lap	13	
7	30	(United Kingdom) Roy Salvadori	Cooper-Climax	51	+2 laps	14	
8	32	(United Kingdom) Jack Fairman	Cooper-Climax	50	+3 laps	11	
9	24	(Germany) Hans Herrmann	Maserati	50	+3 laps	18	
10	34	(United Kingdom) Cliff Allison	Lotus-Climax	49	+4 laps	16	
11	50	(Australia) Jack Brabham	Cooper-Climax	49	+4 laps	19	
12	28	(Italy) Gerino Gerini	Maserati	48	+5 laps	17	
13	52	(New Zealand) Bruce McLaren	Cooper-Climax	48	+5 laps	21	
14	58	(Morocco) Robert La Caze	Cooper-Climax	48	+5 laps	23	
15	60	(France) André Guelfi	Cooper-Climax	48	+5 laps	25	
16	36	(United Kingdom) Graham Hill	Lotus-Climax	45	+8 laps	12	
Ret	12	(United Kingdom) Stuart Lewis-Evans	Vanwall	41	Fatal accident	3	
Ret	54	(France) François Picard	Cooper-Climax	31^{2}	Accident	24	
Ret	56	(United Kingdom) Tom Bridger	Cooper-Climax	30^{3}	Accident	22	
Ret	10	(United Kingdom) Tony Brooks	Vanwall	29	Engine	7	
Ret	2	(Belgium) Olivier Gendebien	Ferrari	29	Accident	6	
Ret	14	(France) Jean Behra	BRM	26	Engine	4	
Ret	26	(Germany) Wolfgang Seidel	Maserati	15	Accident	20	
Ret	20	(United Kingdom) Ron Flockhart	BRM	15	Camshaft	15	
Ret	38	(France) Maurice Trintignant	Cooper-Climax	9	Engine	9	

Notes

- ^1 – Includes 1 point for fastest lap
- ^2 – The Motor Sport magazine lists Picard with 28 laps, and indirectly supports this lower lap count with the article's narrative
- ^3 – The Motor Sport magazine lists Bridger with 26 laps, and indirectly supports this lower lap count with the article's narrative

== Final Championship standings ==
- **Bold text** indicates the World Champions.

Drivers' Championship standings

Pos	Driver	Points
1	(United Kingdom) **Mike Hawthorn**	42 (49)
2	(United Kingdom) Stirling Moss	41
3	(United Kingdom) Tony Brooks	24
4	(United Kingdom) Roy Salvadori	15
5	(United Kingdom) Peter Collins	14

Constructors' Championship standings

Pos	Constructor	Points
1	(United Kingdom) **Vanwall**	48 (57)
2	(Italy) Ferrari	40 (57)
3	(United Kingdom) Cooper-Climax	31
4	(United Kingdom) BRM	18
5	(Italy) Maserati	6

- Notes: Only the top five positions are included for both sets of standings. Only the best 6 results counted towards each Championship. Numbers without parentheses are Championship points; numbers in parentheses are total points scored.

Previous race: 1958 Italian Grand Prix	FIA Formula One World Championship; 1958 season	Next race: 1959 Monaco Grand Prix
Previous race: 1957 Moroccan Grand Prix	Moroccan Grand Prix	Next race: None
