= Anfa Circuit =

Motorsport venue in Morocco

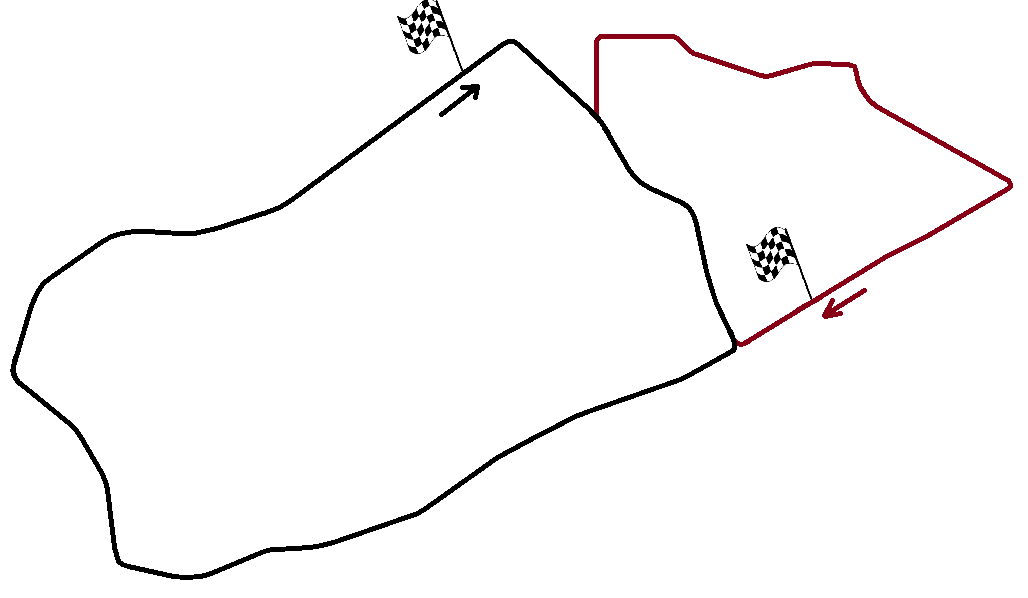
Layouts of Anfa Circuit (brown) and Ain-Diab Circuit (black)

The Anfa Circuit was a street circuit in Morocco. Laid out in the western suburbs of Casablanca, it was used in several layouts for the new Casablanca Grand Prix in 1931, 1932 and 1934. From 1957 on the Ain-Diab Circuit was used, which bordered the old Anfa Circuit.

== Course layout ==
The original 1931 circuit was 6.7 km long and ran anti-clockwise. It started on the wide main highway westward, the Route d'Azemmour (now the Boulevard Abdelkrim Al Khattabi), before turning a hard left northward onto the Boulevard de la Grande Corniche and the Rue Ibn Jafer Anfa Supérieur before another sharp left onto the curves of the Boulevard du Lido back to the main straight. The first race drew a large crowd of spectators and dignitaries, including Sidi Mohammed, the Sultan of Morocco, the Grand Vizier and the Resident-General Lucien Saint. The Swiss publication "Automobil Revue" wrote

"On the wide straights and well built curves the drivers could make full use of the speed of their cars. The visibility over the course was ideal for the spectators".

The next year a new 8.9 km circuit was designed closer to the city centre, through the Bourgogne district. Running clockwise now, it started on the Boulevard de la Corniche, sweeping along the curves of the beachfront. It then turned right onto the long, wide Boulevard Mohamed Zerktouni straight. This led to the right turn onto the equally wide Boulevard d'Anfa (now the Boulevard Al Massira Al Khadra) and Boulevard Franklin Roosevelt, before coming to the final hairpin that leads up to the start–finish straight.

After a year's absence, the 1934 race used yet another layout – a combination of the two previous circuits, with the roads widened to 11 meters and a new pits and spectator grandstand.

== Sources ==
- Moroccan Grand Prix
- www.kolumbus.fi - Anfa Circuit
