= Simone Bignall =

Australian philosopher

Education
- Education: University of Sydney (PhD), University of Adelaide (BA)
- Doctoral advisor: Moira Gatens

Philosophical work
- Era: 21st-century philosophy
- Region: Western philosophy
- School: Continental
- Institutions: University of Technology Sydney
- Main interests: Postcolonialism Political Philosophy Decolonisation
- Notable ideas: Ex-Colonialism

Simone Bignall is an Australian political philosopher. She is a senior researcher in the Jumbunna Indigenous Nations and Collaborative Futures Hub at the University of Technology Sydney. Her academic work has focused on "excolonialism" (or "exit from colonialism") as a philosophy of collaborative transformation.

== Education ==
Bignall completed her doctoral degree in philosophy at the University of Sydney in 2007, supervised by Professor Moira Gatens. In 2010, she received a postdoctoral award and subsequently was appointed a Faculty Lecturer in Philosophy at the University of New South Wales. She joined the Office of Indigenous Strategy and Engagement at Flinders University of South Australia before taking up her current role at the University of Technology Sydney in 2019.

== Research ==
Bignall's primary research interests fall within the field of postcolonial political philosophy, informed particularly by her work with Indigenous peoples engaged in sovereign Nation-building for self-determination and treaty. Her publications typically seek alliances between Indigenous Australian and contemporary European philosophies, aiming to find shared conceptual orientations. Her academic work is guided by a particular interest in the philosophical lineage from Spinoza to Deleuze and traverses critical posthumanism and continental philosophy, anarchism, colonial and postcolonial politics and culture, theories of embodiment and agency, feminism and ethics.

Simone Bignall is Associate Editor of Interconnections: International Journal of Posthumanism. With Larissa Behrendt, Daryle Rigney and Linda Tuhiwai Smith, Bignall is founding co-editor of the book series Indigenous Self-Rule, published by Bloomsbury Academic. She also co-edited the Rowman and Littlefield series on Continental Philosophy in Austral-Asia and on Indigenous Nations and Collaborative Futures. She is a former Chair of the Australasian Society for Continental Philosophy (2016–2018). Dr Bignall is best known for her research on system transformations, particularly in relation to the politics of Decolonisation and Postcolonialism. She appears regularly as a curator and lecturer for Professor Rosi Braidotti's annual Summer School on Posthumanism at the University of Utrecht and participates in international projects funded by research organisations based in Canada, Australia and the United Kingdom.

== Reviews ==
Bignall was co-editor of Posthuman Ecologies, published by Rowman & Littlefield in 2019, with Rosi Braidotti. A review in French Studies stated, "the volume is a necessary and timely intervention, demonstrating the continuing impact of twentieth-century and contemporary French thought in the interdisciplinary humanities."

== Books ==
- Postcolonial Agency: Critique and Constructivism (Edinburgh 2010)
- Deleuze and the Postcolonial (with Paul R. Patton, 2010)
- Agamben and Colonialism (with Marcelo Svirsky, 2012)
- Deleuze and Pragmatism (with Sean Bowden and Paul R. Patton, 2014)
- Posthuman Ecologies (with Rosi Braidotti, 2019)
- The Indigenous Nation Building Glossary (with Daryle Rigney, Anthea Compton and Stephen Cornell, 2026).
- Excolonialism: Ethics after Enjoyment, forthcoming
