= Colledge =

Colledge is a surname. Notable people with the surname include:

- Brant Colledge (born 1994), Australian footballer
- Cecilia Colledge (1920–2008), British figure skater
- Daryn Colledge (born 1982), American football player
- J. J. Colledge (1908–1997), British naval historian
- Malcolm Colledge (1939–2015), British archaeologist, expert in the art of Palmyra
- Richard Colledge, Australian philosopher
- George Welstead Colledge (1834–1863), British district collector, India
- Thomas Richardson Colledge (1796–1879), Scottish surgeon and missionary

== See also ==
- College (disambiguation)
