= La Caze =

La Caze, LaCaze, or Lacaze may refer to:

People

- Claude Lacaze (1940–2026), French rugby player
- Genevieve LaCaze (born 1989), Australian athlete
- Joey LaCaze (1971–2013), American drummer
- Louis La Caze (1798–1869), French physician and art collector
- Marguerite La Caze (born 1964), Australian philosopher
- Robert La Caze (1917–2015), French-born Moroccan racing driver

Places

- Lacaze, a commune in France

== See also ==
- Caze (disambiguation)
