= Aeroscout Scout B1-100 =

Swiss industrial unmanned helicopter

Scout B1-100
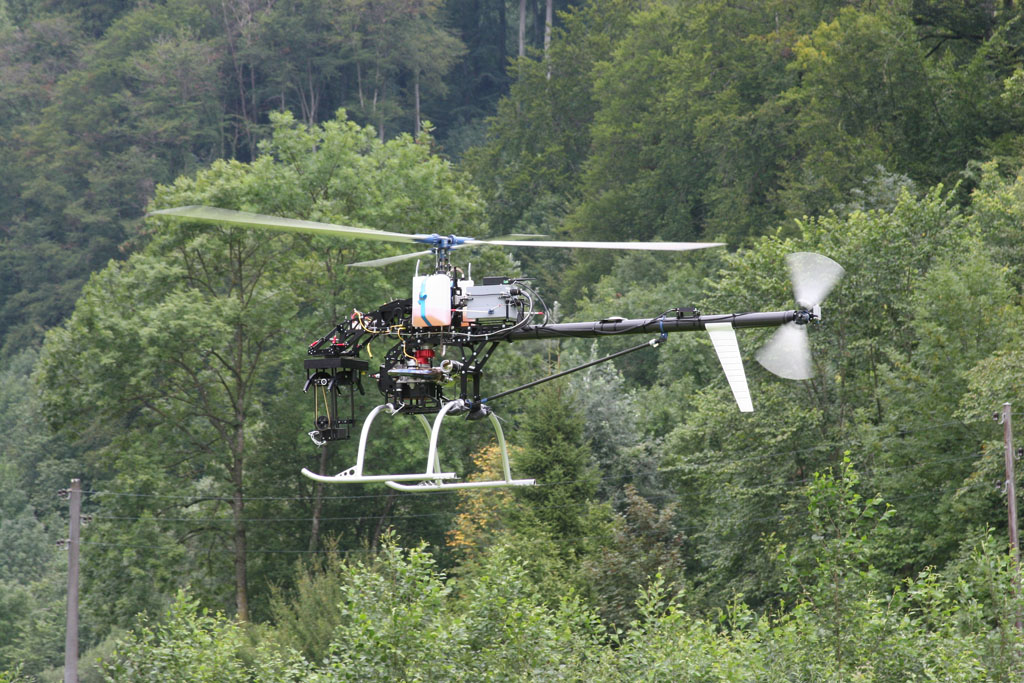

General information
- Type: Autonomous unmanned helicopter drone
- National origin: Switzerland
- Manufacturer: Aeroscout
- Status: Prototypes

The Aeroscout Scout B1-100 is a small Swiss unmanned helicopter drone developed for roles such as aerial mapping, surveillance and law enforcement. It has also been used for airborne laser scanning. It is equipped with inertial navigation systems and GPS navigation to aid in control, and can either be directly controlled or operate over pre-programmed flight paths.

== Specifications ==
Data from

General characteristics

- Crew: None
- Length: 3.3 m (10 ft 10 in)
- Width: 0.5 m (1 ft 8 in)
- Height: 1.0 m (3 ft 3 in)
- Empty weight: 44 kg (97 lb)
- Gross weight: 77 kg (170 lb) Maximum load: 18 kg (40 lb)
- Fuel capacity: 10 L (2.6 US gal; 2.2 imp gal) in 2 tanks
- Powerplant: 1 × 100 cc (6.1 cu in) air-cooled single cylinder gasoline engine, 13.3 kW (17.8 hp)
- Main rotor diameter: 3.2 m (10 ft 6 in)

Performance

- Maximum speed: 110 km/h (68 mph, 59 kn)
- Endurance: 1 hour 30 minutes

Avionics

- autonomous flight control system with automatic, assisted, and manual modes
