= ASCP =

ASCP may refer to:

- American Society for Clinical Pathology
- American Society of Consultant Pharmacists
- Australasian Society for Continental Philosophy
