= Cazes =

Cazes or Cazès may refer to:

== People ==
- Alexandre Cazes (1991–2017), criminal entrepreneur
- Charles de Cazes (1808–1867), notary and politician in Canada East
- Daniel Cazés (1939–2012), Mexican anthropologist
- David Cazès (1851–1913), Moroccan Jewish educator and writer
- Jean-Louis Cazes (born 1951), French footballer
- Jean-Michel Cazes (1935–2023), French winemaker and insurance executive
- Mario Cazes (1890–1972), French composer, conductor and violinist
- Pierre-Jacques Cazes (1676–1754), French historical painter
- Romain Cazes (1810–1881), French historical painter

== Places ==
- Cazes-Mondenard, a commune in France
- Pueblo Cazes, a village and municipality in Argentina

== See also ==
- Caze (disambiguation)
