= 12 Hours of Casablanca =

Endurance motor race, 1952 and 1953

The 12 Hours of Casablanca was a sports car endurance race organised on the route of the future Ain-Diab Circuit in Morocco. Only two editions were held in 1952 and 1953, before the race was replaced by the Moroccan Grand Prix in Agadir for the 1954 season.

== History ==
The race was held on a road circuit, partially on the main road from Casablanca, that was initially 4.2 kilometers long in 1952. By 1953, the route was changed to 3.26 kilometers. The competition was intended for sports racing cars and for passenger cars as well. The starting grid was of a 'Le Mans start'-type.

=== 1952 ===
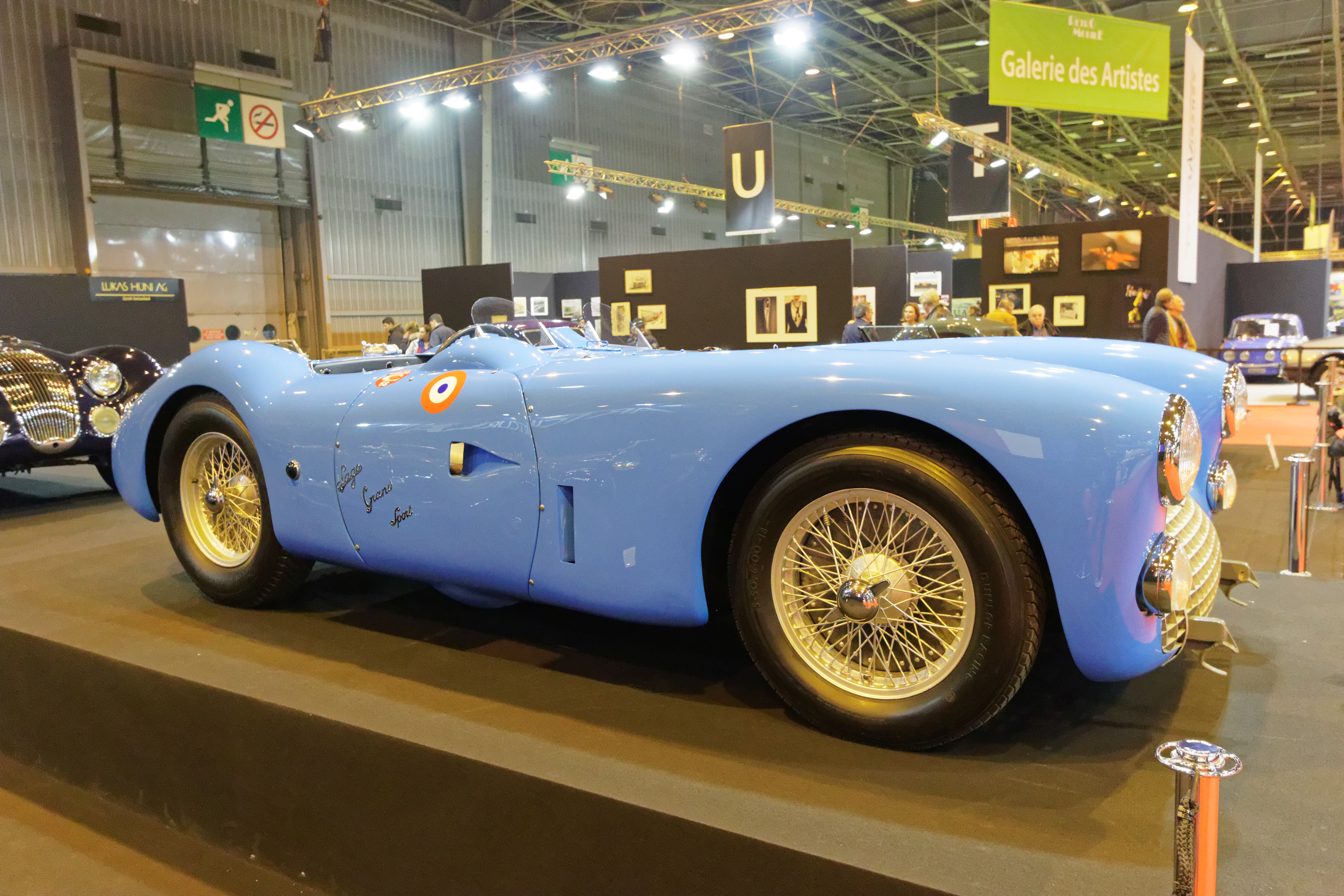
Talbot-Lago T26GS

In December 1952, the first edition of the 12 Hours of Casablanca race was held. 24 entrants had started the race, but only 14 of them finished and were classified.

Pos.	No.	Drivers	Car	Laps
1st	22	(France) Charles Pozzi (France) Lucien Vincent	Talbot-Lago T26GS	264
2nd	25	(France) Jean Lucas (France) Jacques Péron	Ferrari 225 S berlinetta	263
3rd	16	(France) Georges de Tudert (Morocco) Robert La Caze	Delahaye 135S	250

=== 1953 ===
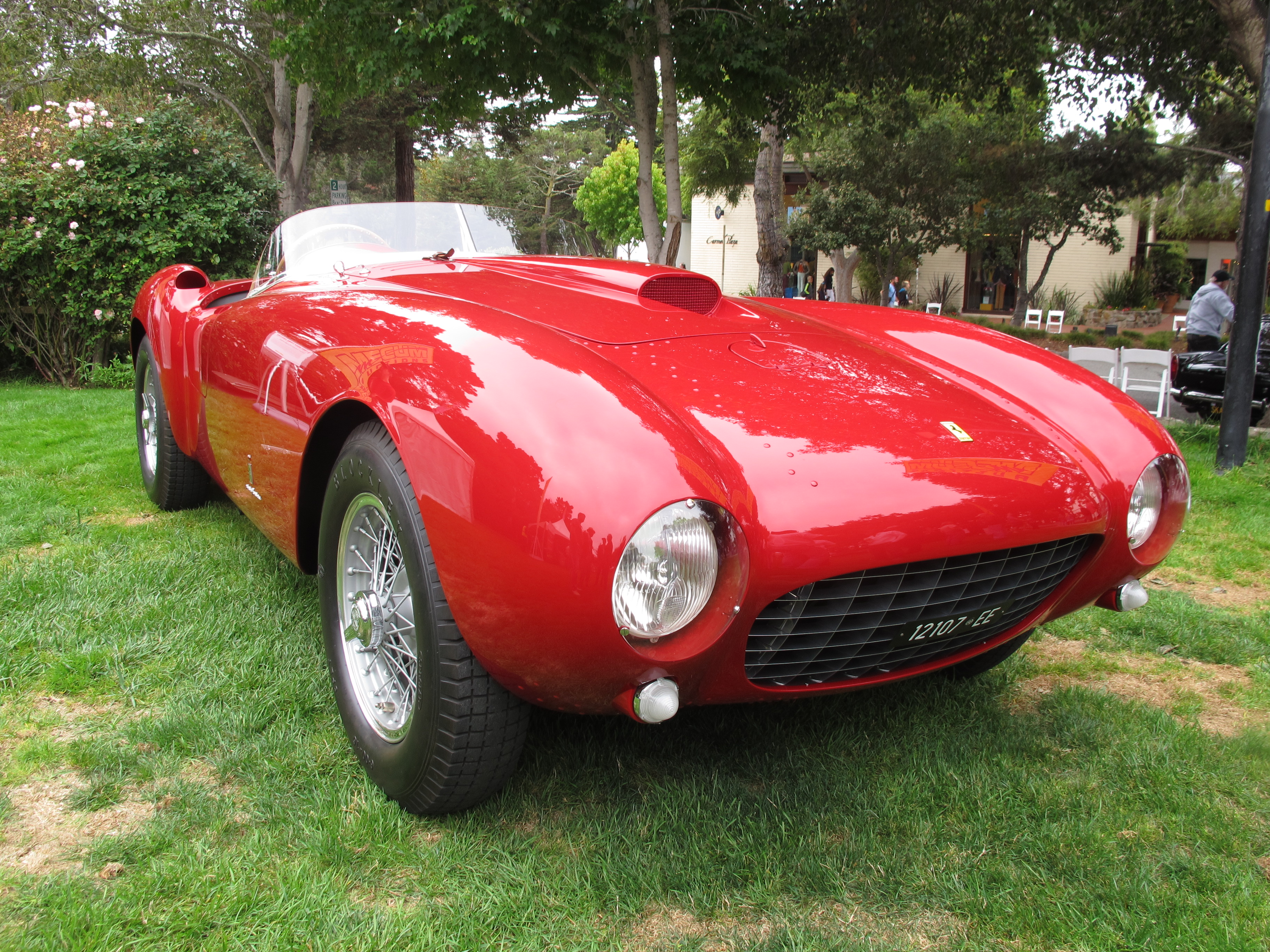
Ferrari 375 MM spyder

The second edition of the endurance race was held in 1953. This time 17 cars finished the race. Casimiro de Oliveira and Alberto Ascari had crashed during practice in their Ferrari 375 MM and had to change teams and cars. Luckily for Ascari, he joined Luigi Villoresi in the Ferrari 500 Mondial and arrived second at the finish line in the actual race. The 500 Mondial that won its class, was based on a Ferrari 625 TF berlinetta chassis that was destroyed in a fire, rebodied by Scaglietti and equipped with a 2.0-litre engine. Charles Pozzi, who won the first edition with his Talbot-Lago T26GS, failed to arrive for the race.

Pos.	Pos.	Class	No.	Drivers	Car
1st	1st	S+2.0	2	(Italy) Giuseppe Farina (Italy) Piero Scotti	Ferrari 375 MM spyder
2nd	1st	S2.0	20	(Italy) Luigi Villoresi (Italy) Alberto Ascari	Ferrari 500 Mondial spyder
3rd	2nd	S+2.0	6	(France) Pierre Levegh (France) Philippe Etancelin	Talbot-Lago T26GS
4th	3rd	S+2.0	8	(United Kingdom) Roy Salvadori (France) "Mike Sparken"	Aston Martin DB3 coupé
5th	4th	S+2.0	7	(United Kingdom) Graham Whitehead (United Kingdom) Peter Whitehead	Aston Martin DB3
6th	2nd	S2.0	25	(France) Jean-Louis Armengaud (France) Élie Bayol	Osca MT4 1100 coupé

Class	No.	Drivers	Car	DNF reason
S+2.0	3	(Italy) Luigi Piotti (Italy) Clemente Biondetti	Ferrari 250 MM	Transmission
S+2.0	5	(France) Georges Grignard (Venezuela) Lino Fayen	Talbot-Lago T26GS	Out of fuel
S+2.0	9	(France) Jean Behra (France) André Guelfi	Gordini T15S	Holed fuel tank
S+2.0	10	(France) John Simone (France) Armand Roboly	Jaguar C-Type	Fuel feed

=== Demise ===
Between 1954 and 1956, no motor racing was organized on this dangerous road circuit and the racing was moved to the Agadir area. Ain-Diab was more suited for the bicycle races. In 1957, the race route was refitted and increased to 7.618 kilometers thanks to the Royal Automobile Club of Morocco. The new track was named Ain-Diab Circuit and hosted the first official Moroccan Grand Prix in 1957.
