= Caze =

Caze, Cazé, or Cazê may refer to:

People

- Casimiro (streamer) (born 1993), Brazilian journalist and sports commentator, nicknamed Cazé
- Cazé Peçanha (born 1968), Brazilian television host
- Amélie Cazé (born 1985), French modern pentathlete
- Christophe Caze (1969–1996), French criminal and terrorist
- Genevieve LaCaze (born 1989), Australian athlete
- Joey LaCaze (1971–2013), American drummer
- Louis La Caze (1798–1869), French physician and collector of paintings
- Robert La Caze (1917–2015), French-born Moroccan racing driver

Places

- Cazê, a township in Tibet

Others

- CazéTV, Brazilian multi-platform sports and entertainment channel

== See also ==
- Cazes (disambiguation)
- La Caze (disambiguation)
