= Paul R. Patton =

Australian philosopher

Paul Robert Patton
- Born: 1950 (age 75–76); Australia

Philosophical work
- Era: Contemporary philosophy
- Region: Western Philosophy
- School: Continental Philosophy
- Main interests: French philosophy, Political philosophy

Paul Robert Patton FAHA (born 1950) is Scientia Professor of Philosophy in the School of History and Philosophy at the University of New South Wales, Sydney, Australia, where he has been since 2002. Patton is known for his publications and conference presentations on Australian Continental political philosophy.

== Career and research interests ==
Patton received a B.A. and M.A. from the University of Sydney, and, in 1979, received a Doctorat D'Universite from Paris VIII (Vincennes). Before he took up his professorship at University of New South Wales, Patton lectured at the Australian National University, in Canberra, Australia, and the University of Sydney. Patton is a member of the Australasian Association of Philosophy.

Patton has published widely on aspects of 20th-century French philosophy, including focus on the works of Deleuze, Derrida and Foucault.

Patton's work is preoccupied by the twin tasks of, on one hand, critically analyzing the modern European philosophical tradition and situating it within its broader social and political milieu, and, on the other, drawing out the implications of that philosophical tradition for our present social, political and legal circumstances. One aspect of Patton's work has been to examine both the liberal political tradition and post-structuralist political philosophy in terms of their implications for contemporary Australian social and political struggles.

Patton is interested in the enduring problem of indigenous reconciliation, which he attributes to the failure of the Anglo-Australian legal system to "translate" indigenous spiritual and economic conceptions and relationship to the land into "a form of property right recognisable by the common law" According to Patton, colonialism, as "a stark expression of the external power of sovereign European states", was made possible by “[t]he absence, in the new land, of equivalent forms of state” and the perceptions of backwardness of the indigenous populations. This was "considered sufficient justification for the imposition of sovereign power."

Between 2000 and 2006, Patton appeared in a number of ABC radio broadcasts, including 'The Descent of Man,' on ABC Radio National's Science Show in 2000, 'Deleuze and Democracy' in 2005, and 'Where philosophy gets done' in 2006, both on the show 'The Philosopher's Zone'.

In 1994 and 1997 Patton was a visiting fellow at the Humanities Research Centre, at Australian National University. In 2005, he was a visiting fellow of the Scots Philosophical Society, at the University of Dundee in Scotland.

== Awards ==
- 2011 Vice-Chancellors Award for Teaching Excellence in Postgraduate Research Supervision Faculty of Social Science
- 2011 elected Fellow of the Australian Academy of the Humanities
- 2010 Faculty of Arts and Social Sciences Dean's Award for Excellence in Postgraduate Research Supervision
- Awarded the 2010 Faculty of Arts and Social Sciences’ Best Doctoral Thesis Prize for the thesis Deleuze, History and Becoming by Craig Lundy
- Awarded the 2009 Faculty of Arts and Social Sciences’ Best Doctoral Thesis Prize for the thesis The Ontological Priority of Events in Gilles Deleuze's The Logic of Sense by Sean Bowden

== Select bibliography ==
=== As author ===
- Deleuze and the Political. London: Routledge, 2000.
- Deleuzian Concepts: Philosophy, Colonization, Politics. Stanford: Stanford University Press, 2010.

=== As editor ===
- Between Deleuze and Derrida. Eds. Paul Patton and John Protevi. London: Continuum, 2003.
- Deleuze: A Critical Reader. Ed. Paul Patton. Cambridge, MA: Blackwell, 1996.
- Deleuze and Pragmatism. Eds. Sean Bowden, Simone Bignall, and Paul Patton. London & New York: Routledge, 2014.

=== As translator ===
- Baudrillard, Jean. The Gulf War Did Not Take Place. Ed. Paul Patton. Bloomington: Indiana University Press, 1995.
- Deleuze, Gilles. Difference and Repetition. Ed. Paul Patton. New York: Columbia University Press, 1994.

== See also ==
- Australasian Society for Continental Philosophy
