= John Protevi =

American philosopher

John L. Protevi (born 1955) is an American philosopher. He is Professor Emeritus at Louisiana State University in Baton Rouge, where he held the Phyllis M. Taylor Professorship of French Studies. He is known for work connecting the philosophy of Gilles Deleuze and Félix Guattari with cognitive science, biology, and political theory.

== Education and career ==
Protevi received a B.A. in Philosophy and M.A. in English from Pennsylvania State University and earned his PhD in philosophy from Loyola University Chicago in 1990. He held a Leverhulme Visiting Research Fellowship at the University of Warwick in 1995–96 before joining the faculty of Louisiana State University. He has held visiting positions including a Distinguished Visiting Professorship at Pennsylvania State University's Institute for the Arts and Humanities (2015) and a Sternberg Professorship at the LSU Ogden Honors College (2021–22).

His awards include the LSU Tiger Athletic Foundation Faculty Teaching Award (2009), the Scots Philosophical Association Centenary Fellowship (2012), the LSU Distinguished Faculty Award (2013), and the designation of Distinguished Research Master at LSU (2015).

== Scholarship ==
Protevi's early work examined time and ontology in the continental tradition. Time and Exteriority: Aristotle, Heidegger, Derrida (Bucknell University Press, 1994) analyzes exteriority as a constitutive dimension of temporal experience. Political Physics: Deleuze, Derrida and the Body Politic (Athlone Press, 2001) addresses political ontology through Deleuzian and Derridean frameworks.

His book Political Affect: Connecting the Social and the Somatic (University of Minnesota Press, 2009) introduces the concept of "political physiology," which examines relations between social forces and somatic response. The book applies this framework to three case studies: the Columbine High School massacre, government responses to Hurricane Katrina, and the Terri Schiavo case. It was reviewed in Notre Dame Philosophical Reviews and Philosophy in Review.

Life, War, Earth: Deleuze and the Sciences (2013) applies Deleuze's ontology to problems in cognitive science, evolutionary biology, and geography. It was reviewed by Eugene W. Holland in Critical Inquiry, who described it as demonstrating "astonishing transdisciplinary reach," and was also reviewed in Isis and Foucault Studies.

Edges of the State (2019), published in Minnesota's Forerunners series, examines state formation, breakdown, and encounters between states and non-state peoples.

Regimes of Violence: Toward a Political Anthropology (2025) extends the political physiology framework to examine human violence and cooperation across historical and contemporary contexts.

In addition to his monographs, Protevi edited A Dictionary of Continental Philosophy (Yale University Press, 2006) and co-edited Between Derrida and Deleuze with Paul Patton (Continuum, 2003).

== Publications ==
=== Books ===
- Time and Exteriority: Aristotle, Heidegger, Derrida (Bucknell University Press, 1994)
- Political Physics: Deleuze, Derrida and the Body Politic (Athlone Press, 2001)
- (with Mark Bonta) Deleuze and Geophilosophy: A Guide and Glossary (Edinburgh University Press, 2004)
- Political Affect: Connecting the Social and the Somatic (University of Minnesota Press, 2009)
- Life, War, Earth: Deleuze and the Sciences (University of Minnesota Press, 2013)
- Edges of the State (University of Minnesota Press, 2019)
- Regimes of Violence: Toward a Political Anthropology (University of Minnesota Press, 2025)

=== Edited volumes ===
- (ed. with Paul Patton) Between Derrida and Deleuze (Continuum, 2003)
- (ed.) Edinburgh Dictionary of Continental Philosophy (Edinburgh University Press, 2005)
- (ed.) A Dictionary of Continental Philosophy (Yale University Press, 2006)
