= Damian Evans =

Australian-Canadian archaeologist (died 2023)

Damian Evans (died 12 September 2023) renowned for his pioneering archaeological work in Southeast Asia, particularly in Cambodia. He is best known for employing airborne laser scanning (LiDAR) technology to uncover vast, previously undocumented medieval urban landscapes surrounding Angkor Wat, fundamentally transforming the understanding of the Khmer Empire's urban and agricultural systems.

Evans began his academic journey at the University of Sydney in 1998.He engaged in extensive fieldwork in Cambodia, which played a crucial role in shaping his research interests and expertise in the region. Evans graduated with First Class Honors and was awarded the University Medal in Archaeology in 2002, recognizing his exceptional academic performance and contributions to the field. In 2007, he completed his doctoral thesis, titled "Putting Angkor on the map: a new survey of a Khmer 'hydraulic city' in historical and theoretical context," utilized radar remote sensing imaging and field surveys to create a comprehensive map of the Angkor region.

== Career and research ==
Starting in the late 1990s, Evans dedicated his career to archaeological research in Cambodia. From 2007 to 2015, he served as the founding director of the University of Sydney's Overseas Research Centre at Siem Reap-Angkor called the Robert Christie Center. During this period, he co-directed the Greater Angkor Project, collaborating with scholars to produce new mapping of Angkor's extensive urban networks. In 2012, Evans led an expedition team that utilized LiDAR technology to reveal the ancient cities of Angkor, Koh Ker and Mahendraparvata on Phnom Kulen. This discovery provided significant insights into the early urban planning of the Khmer Empire as it shifted from the Phnom Kulen mountain range towards the rice-growing seasonal wetlands of Angkor.

In 2014, Evans was awarded a European Research Council Starting Grant for his Cambodian Archaeological LiDAR Initiative. This project conducted the largest archaeological LiDAR survey in Asia at the time, mapping over 3,000 square kilometers in Cambodia. The findings from this research significantly advanced the understanding of Angkorian settlement patterns and urban development.

By late 2022 Evans had left his base in Siem Reap and moved Paris, having been awarded a major European Research Council (ERC) grant. In early 2023, despite the burden of a cancer diagnosis, he organized a 3,000 km2 LiDAR project for the Agence Française de Développement in southern Laos. He also co-edited The Ankorian World (2023), edited Angkor and the Khmer Civilization with Michael D. Coe, and made media appearances during his health crisis.

== Legacy and impact ==
The impact of Evans's work extends beyond academic circles; his findings on ancient agricultural practices and urban planning have provided insights into socio-economic patterns and the factors contributing to the decline of the Khmer Empire. These revelations not only deepen our historical understanding but also resonate with contemporary issues related to agricultural sustainability and community engagement in heritage conservation.

Evans's work has had a lasting impact on the field of archaeology, particularly in the study of Southeast Asian civilizations. His innovative use of LiDAR technology set new standards for archaeological research and led to a reevaluation of the complexity and scale of ancient urban centers in the region. His contributions have been widely recognized in academic circles and featured in prominent media outlets.

== Early influences and personal life ==
Evans was born in Victoria, British Columbia, Canada, on 22 September 1975.

He was the firstborn of Chad Arthur Evans and Marion Ross, a cultural historian and nurse educator, respectively. His family migrated to Australia in February 1982, where in Adelaide, his father worked as a consultant planner for the South Australia State Heritage Conservation Branch. As a child Damian accompanied his father on field expeditions surveying vast historic landscapes. He was a prodigious reader (English and French) and later cultural traveler even before he focused on Southeast Asian archaeology.

Evans died on September 12, 2023, in Paris, France, after a two-year battle with Non-Hodgkin's lymphoma. He was 47 years old and is survived by his Khmer wife and two young children. His death was mourned by colleagues and friends worldwide, who remembered him for his generosity, enthusiasm, and significant contributions to archaeology.
