= Joanne Faulkner =

Australian writer, philosopher

- Born: 14 April 1972 (age 54); Armidale, New South Wales

Philosophical work
- Era: Contemporary philosophy
- Region: Western philosophy
- School: Continental
- Main interests: philosophy of sexuality innocence political philosophy

Joanne Faulkner (born 14 April 1972) is an Australian writer, philosopher and Future Fellow in Cultural Studies at Macquarie University.

== Biography ==
Faulkner received her Ph.D. in philosophy from La Trobe University in 2006. Faulkner is married with two children.

== Work ==
She is known for her research on the ontology of childhood, Nietzsche's thought, and the ethics of innocence.

Faulkner was the Chair of the Australasian Society for Continental Philosophy from 2012 to 2015 and is presently the Society's Deputy Chair. She is also a member of the project Living Archives on Eugenics in Western Canada.

In her 2011 book, The Importance of Being Innocent, she discusses the concept of innocence in regards to children, arguing that it the idea of "innocent childhood" serves a broader social need to manage anxieties about the pressures placed upon adults by contemporary life, as well as racial, gender, and class difference, rather than serving the needs of children. The release of the book close to Christmas time caused some controversy in the popular media A review by Gender and Education called her book "a thought provoking and wide-ranging consideration of philosophical perspectives on contemporary assumptions about childhood" in the Westernised world, especially in Australia. Faulkner has stated that her interest in exploring innocence in relation to children came from "the expectations we put on them through being a parent," but that she also is interested in innocence as it applies to political thought and political justifications.

Faulkner's most recent book, Young and Free: [Post]Colonial Ontologies of Childhood, Memory, and History in Australia, concerns the modern conceptualisation of childhood in relation to colonisation, and the ways in which Australian ideals of (and anxieties about) childhood reflect Australia's colonial past in particular. Drawing on a psychoanalytic theoretical approach, Faulkner argues that representations of childhood in Australia serve as a screen for more fundamental anxieties about colonial violence. Likewise, she argues that the removal of Aboriginal children (known as the stolen generations) has been both an effective instrument of colonisation and a symptom for the coloniser's own sense of displacement.

== Bibliography ==
- Faulkner J, 2016, Young and Free: [Post]Colonial Ontologies of Childhood, Memory, and History in Australia, Rowman and Littlefield International.
- Faulkner J; Zolkos, M, 2015, Critical Childhood Studies and the Practice of Interdisciplinarity, Lexington Books, London.
- Faulkner J, 2011, The Importance of Being Innocent: Why We Worry About Children, Cambridge University Press, Melbourne
- Faulkner J, 2010, Dead Letters to Nietzsche; or, the Necromantic Art of Reading Philosophy, 1, Ohio University Press, Athens, Ohio
- Sharpe M; Faulkner J, 2008, Understanding Psychoanalysis, Acumen, Stocksfield
