= Robert Sinnerbrink =

Australian philosopher

- Awards: ARC Future Fellowship, University Medal in Philosophy (USYD)

Education
- Education: University of Sydney
- Thesis: Metaphysics of modernity: The problem of identity and difference in Hegel and Heidegger (2001)
- Doctoral advisor: György Márkus

Philosophical work
- Era: 21st-century philosophy
- Region: Western philosophy
- School: Continental
- Institutions: Macquarie University
- Main interests: philosophy of film, Heidegger

Robert Sinnerbrink is an Australian philosopher and associate professor of Philosophy at Macquarie University. He is an ARC Future Fellowship recipient and a former Chair of the Australasian Society for Continental Philosophy (2007–2010). Sinnerbrink is known for his research on aesthetics and philosophy of film.

== Books ==
- Cinematic Ethics: Exploring Ethical Experience through Film, Abingdon and New York: Routledge, 2016
- New Philosophies of Film: Thinking Images, New York/London: Continuum, 2011
- Understanding Hegelianism, Chesham: Acumen Press, 2007
- Critique Today, edited with Jean-Philippe Deranty, Nicholas H. Smith, and Peter Schmiedgen, Leiden: Brill, 2006
- Recognition, Work, Politics: New Directions in French Critical Theory, edited with Jean-Philippe Deranty, Danielle Petherbridge, and John Rundell, Leiden: Brill, 2007
