= Airborne lidar =

Use of lidar onboard aircraft

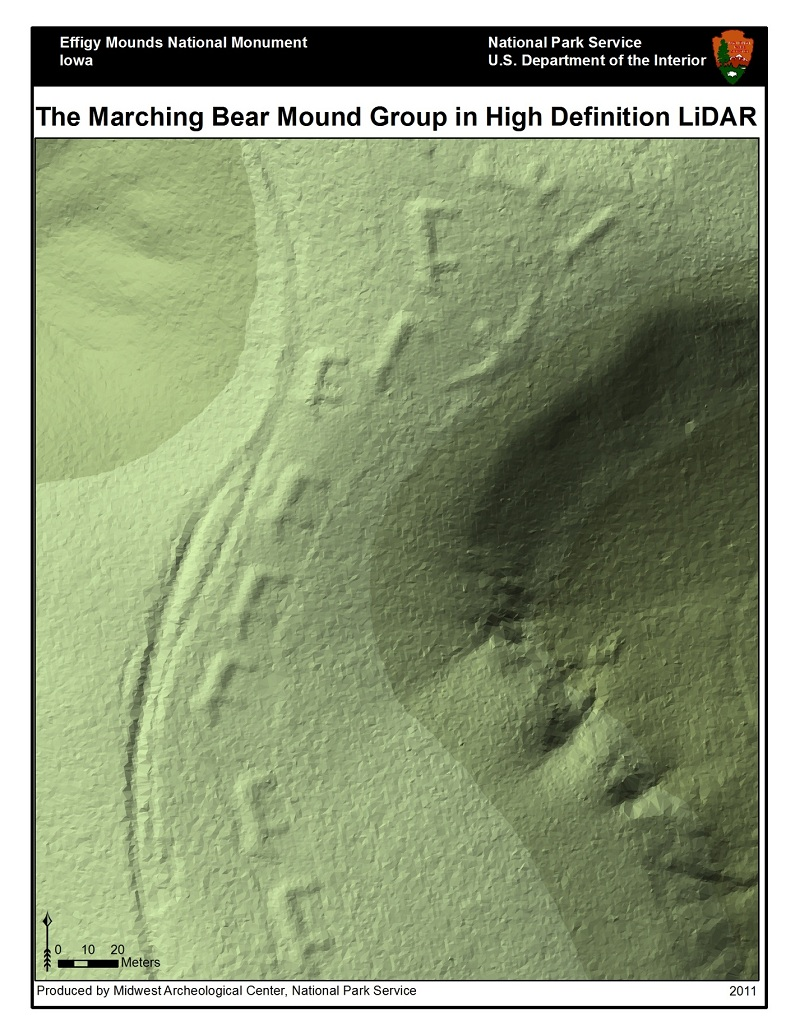
Lidar-derived image of the Marching Bears Mound Group, Effigy Mounds National Monument, United States

Airborne lidar or airborne laser scanning (ALS) is the use of lidar onboard aircraft, including drones, for aerial surveys. It has been applied for mapping the terrain (topographic mapping), water depth (bathymetry), buildings, and vegetation.

An airplane collecting treetop data over a Brazilian rainforest

In this view, the viewer flies down to the rainforest canopy and flies through the virtual leaves.

This visualisation shows an airplane collecting a 50 km swathe of lidar data over the Brazilian rainforest. For ground-level features, colours range from deep brown to tan. Vegetation heights are depicted in shades of green, where dark greens are closest to the ground and light greens are the highest.

== Data products ==
The main data products of airborne lidar include digital elevation models (DEM) and digital surface models (DSM). The points and ground points are the vectors of discrete points while DEM and DSM are interpolated raster grids of discrete points. The process also involves capturing of digital aerial photographs. To interpret deep-seated landslides for example, under the cover of vegetation, scarps, tension cracks or tipped trees airborne lidar is used. Airborne lidar digital elevation models can see through the canopy of forest cover, perform detailed measurements of scarps, erosion and tilting of electric poles.

Airborne lidar data can be filtered and interpolated to generate digital terrain models. The laser is directed at the region to be mapped and each point's height above the ground is calculated by subtracting the original z-coordinate from the corresponding digital terrain model elevation. Based on this height above the ground the non-vegetation data is obtained which may include objects such as buildings, electric power lines, flying birds, insects, etc. The rest of the points are treated as vegetation and used for modeling and mapping. Within each of these plots, lidar metrics are calculated by calculating statistics such as mean, standard deviation, skewness, percentiles, quadratic mean, etc.

Airborne lidar systems were traditionally able to acquire only a few peak returns, while more recent systems acquire and digitize the entire reflected signal. Scientists analysed the waveform signal for extracting peak returns using Gaussian decomposition. Zhuang et al., 2017 used this approach for estimating aboveground biomass. Handling the huge amounts of full-waveform data is difficult. Therefore, Gaussian decomposition of the waveforms is effective, since it reduces the data and is supported by existing workflows that support interpretation of 3D point clouds. Recent studies investigated voxelisation. The intensities of the waveform samples are inserted into a voxelised space (3D grayscale image) building up a 3D representation of the scanned area. Related metrics and information can then be extracted from that voxelised space. Structural information can be extracted using 3D metrics from local areas and there is a case study that used the voxelisation approach for detecting dead standing eucalypt trees in Australia.

== Applications ==
=== Archaeology ===
Lidar has many uses in archaeology, including planning of field campaigns, mapping features under forest canopy, and overview of broad, continuous features indistinguishable from the ground. Lidar can produce high-resolution datasets quickly and cheaply. Lidar-derived products can be easily integrated into a geographic information system (GIS) for analysis and interpretation.

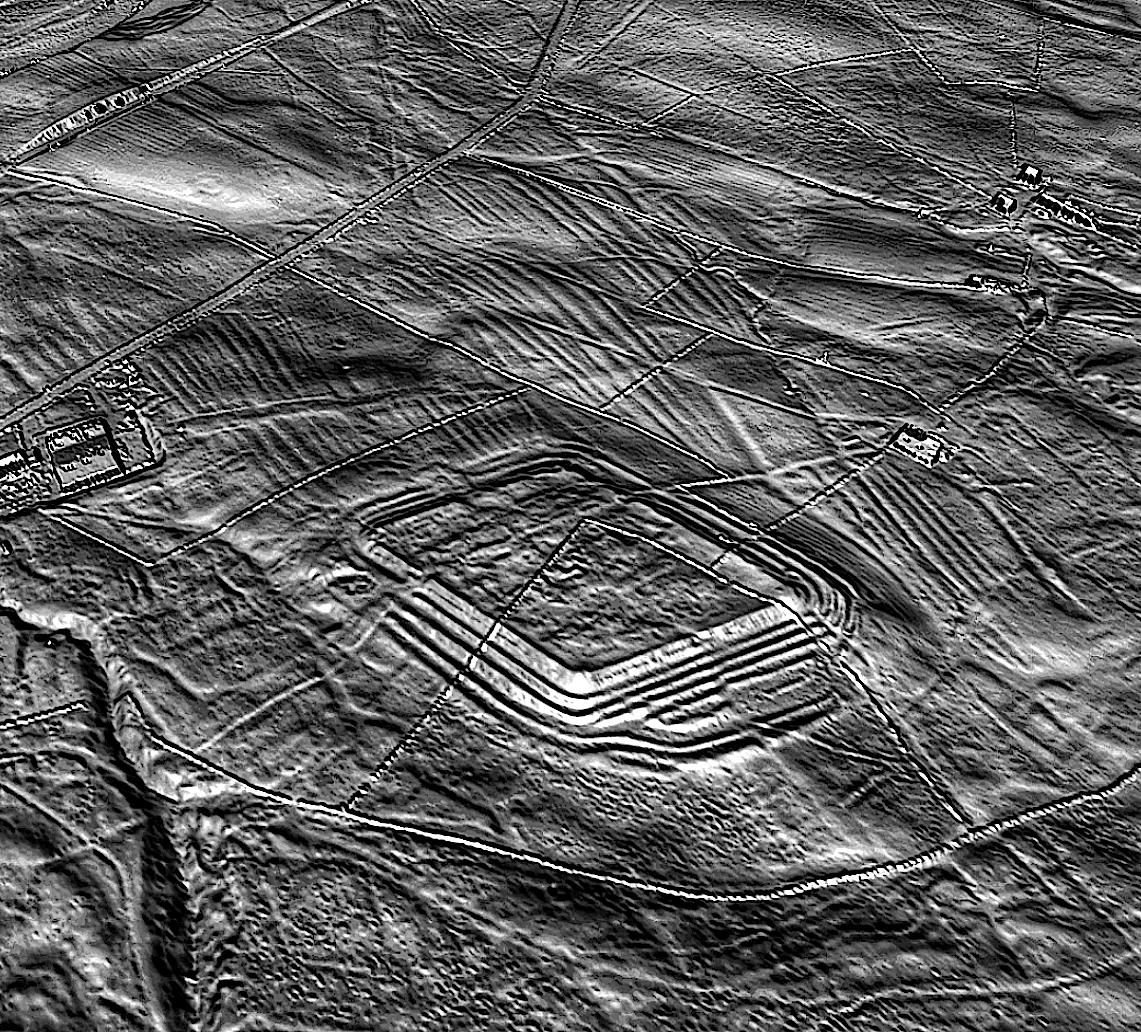
A lidar view of Epiacum Roman fort in Northumberland

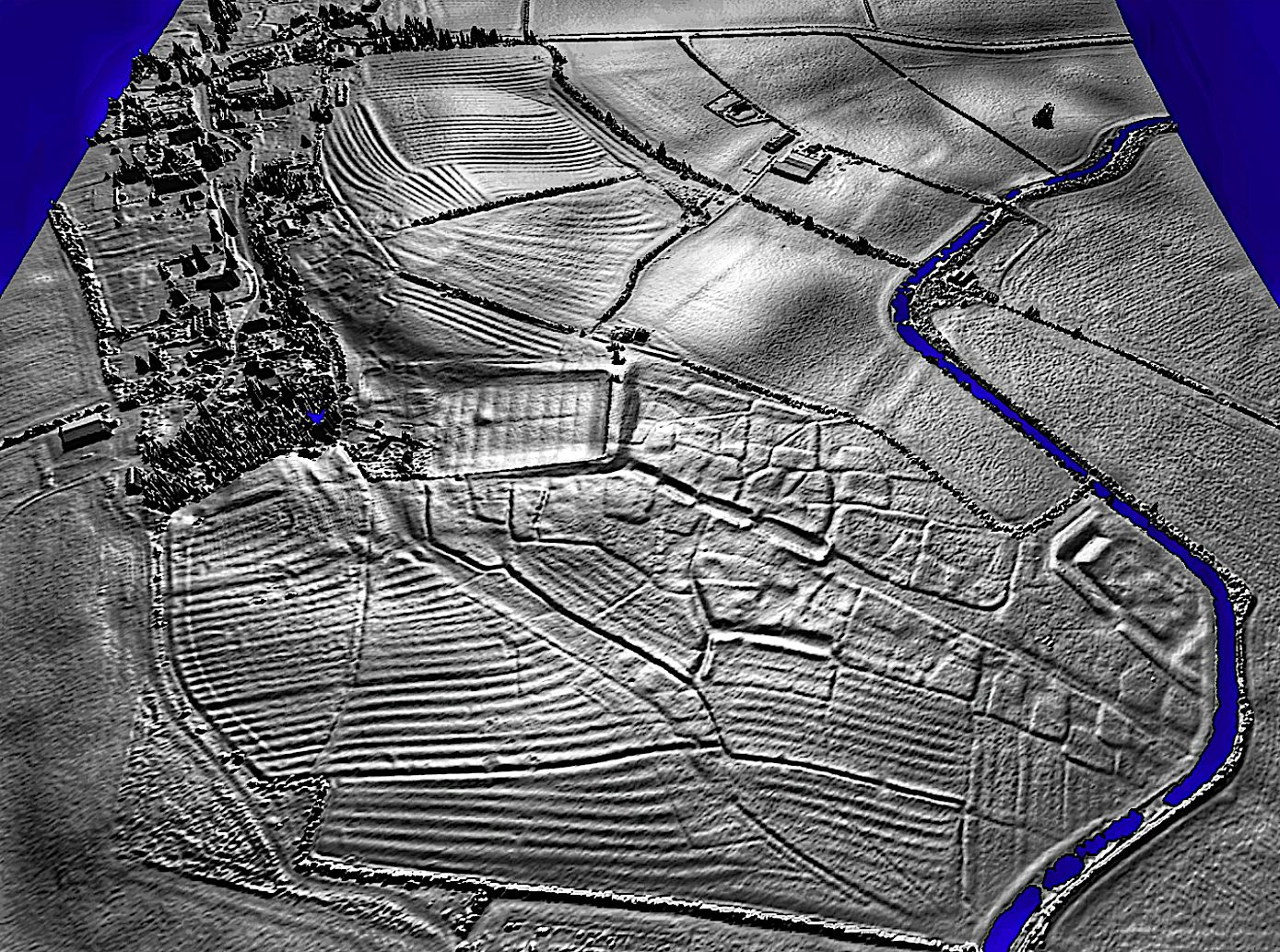
An oblique lidar view from a 3D model of the site of Wormleighton deserted medieval village in Warwickshire

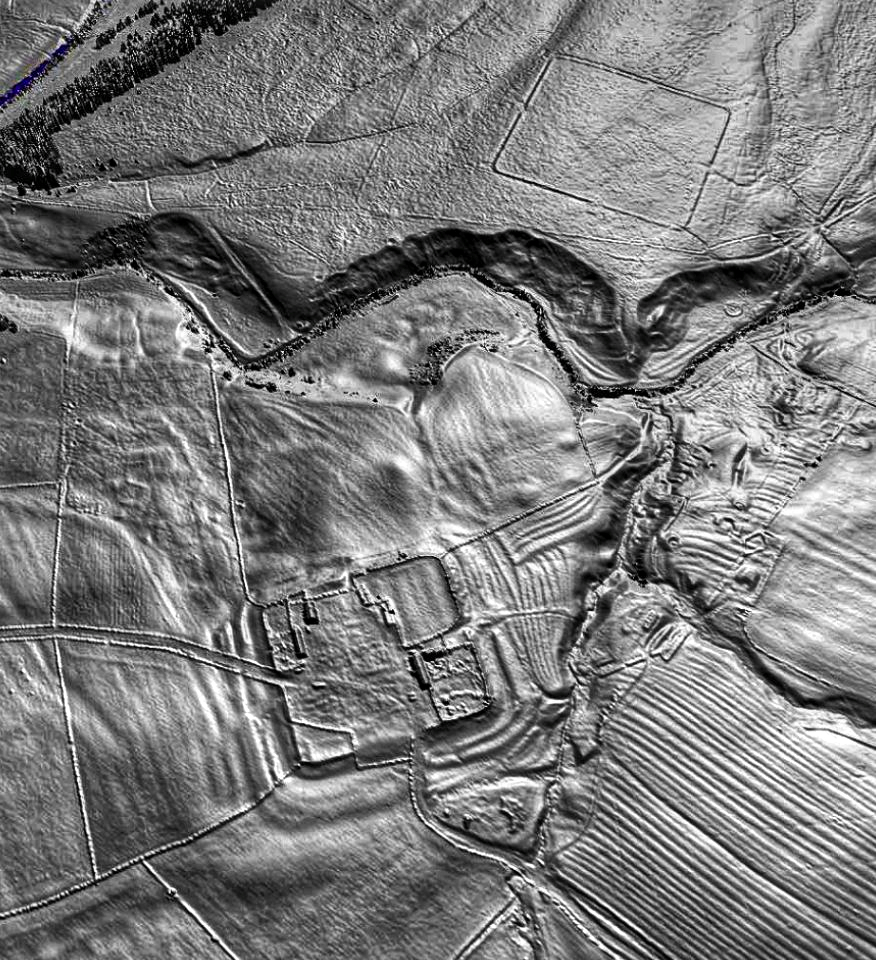
A lidar view of Bremenium Roman fort, vicus and Birdhope camps together with later Medieval ridge and furrow in Northumberland

Lidar can also help to create high-resolution digital elevation models (DEMs) of archaeological sites that can reveal micro-topography that is otherwise hidden by vegetation. The intensity of the returned lidar signal can be used to detect features buried under flat vegetated surfaces such as fields, especially when mapping using the infrared spectrum. The presence of these features affects plant growth and thus the amount of infrared light reflected back. For example, at Fort Beauséjour – Fort Cumberland National Historic Site, Canada, lidar discovered archaeological features related to the siege of the Fort in 1755. Features that could not be distinguished on the ground or through aerial photography were identified by overlaying hill shades of the DEM created with artificial illumination from various angles. Another example is work at Caracol by Arlen Chase and his wife Diane Zaino Chase. In 2012, lidar was used to search for the legendary city of La Ciudad Blanca or "City of the Monkey God" in the La Mosquitia region of the Honduran jungle. During a seven-day mapping period, evidence was found of man-made structures. In June 2013, the rediscovery of the city of Mahendraparvata was announced. In southern New England, lidar was used to reveal stone walls, building foundations, abandoned roads, and other landscape features obscured in aerial photography by the region's dense forest canopy. In Cambodia, lidar data were used by Damian Evans and Roland Fletcher to reveal anthropogenic changes to Angkor landscape.

In 2012, lidar revealed that the Purépecha settlement of Angamuco in Michoacán, Mexico had about as many buildings as today's Manhattan; while in 2016, its use in mapping ancient Maya causeways in northern Guatemala, revealed 17 elevated roads linking the ancient city of El Mirador to other sites. In 2018, archaeologists using lidar discovered more than 60,000 man-made structures in the Maya Biosphere Reserve, a "major breakthrough" that showed the Maya civilization was much larger than previously thought. In 2024, archaeologists using lidar discovered a new Maya site, Valeriana, as well as the Upano Valley sites in Ecuador.

=== Bathymetry ===
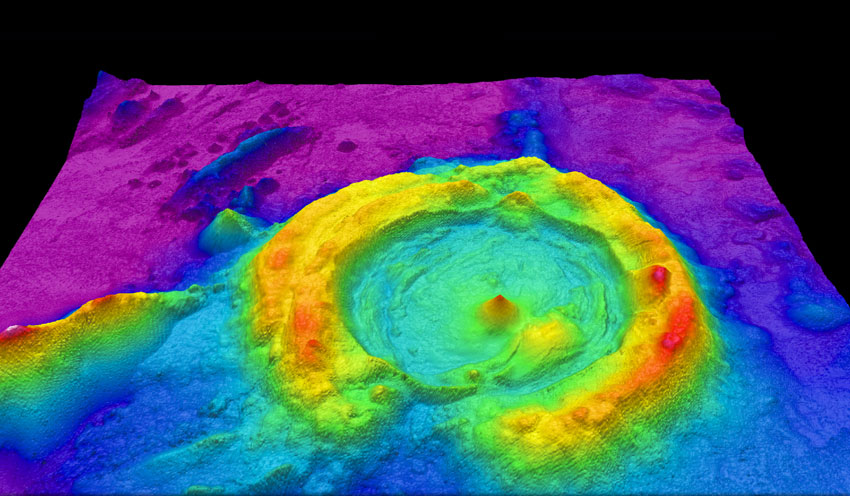
Airborne Lidar Bathymetric Technology-High-resolution multibeam lidar map showing faulted and deformed seafloor geology, in shaded relief and coloured by depth

Airborne lidar can also be used to create bathymetric models in shallow water. The airborne lidar bathymetric technological system involves the measurement of time of flight of a signal from a source to its return to the sensor. The data acquisition technique involves a sea floor mapping component and a ground truth component that includes video transects and sampling. It works using a green spectrum (532 nm) laser beam. Two beams are projected onto a fast rotating mirror, which creates an array of points. One of the beams penetrates the water and also detects the bottom surface of the water under favorable conditions.

Water depth measurable by lidar depends on the clarity of the water and the absorption of the wavelength used. Water is most transparent to green and blue light, so these will penetrate deepest in clean water. Blue-green light of 532 nm produced by frequency doubled solid-state IR laser output is the standard for airborne bathymetry. This light can penetrate water but pulse strength attenuates exponentially with distance traveled through the water. Lidar can measure depths from about 0.9 to 40 m (3 to 131 ft), with vertical accuracy in the order of 15 cm (6 in). The surface reflection makes water shallower than about 0.9 m (3 ft) difficult to resolve, and absorption limits the maximum depth. Turbidity causes scattering and has a significant role in determining the maximum depth that can be resolved in most situations, and dissolved pigments can increase absorption depending on wavelength. Other reports indicate that water penetration tends to be between two and three times Secchi depth. Bathymetric lidar is most useful in the 0–10 m (0–33 ft) depth range in coastal mapping.

On average in fairly clear coastal seawater lidar can penetrate to about 7 m (23 ft), and in turbid water up to about 3 m (10 ft). An average value found by Saputra et al., 2021, is for the green laser light to penetrate water about one and a half to two times Secchi depth in Indonesian waters. Water temperature and salinity have an effect on the refractive index which has a small effect on the depth calculation.

The data obtained shows the full extent of the land surface exposed above the sea floor. This technique is extremely useful as it will play an important role in the major sea floor mapping program. The mapping yields onshore topography as well as underwater elevations. Sea floor reflectance imaging is another solution product from this system which can benefit mapping of underwater habitats. This technique has been used for three-dimensional image mapping of California's waters using a hydrographic lidar.

=== Ecology and conservation ===
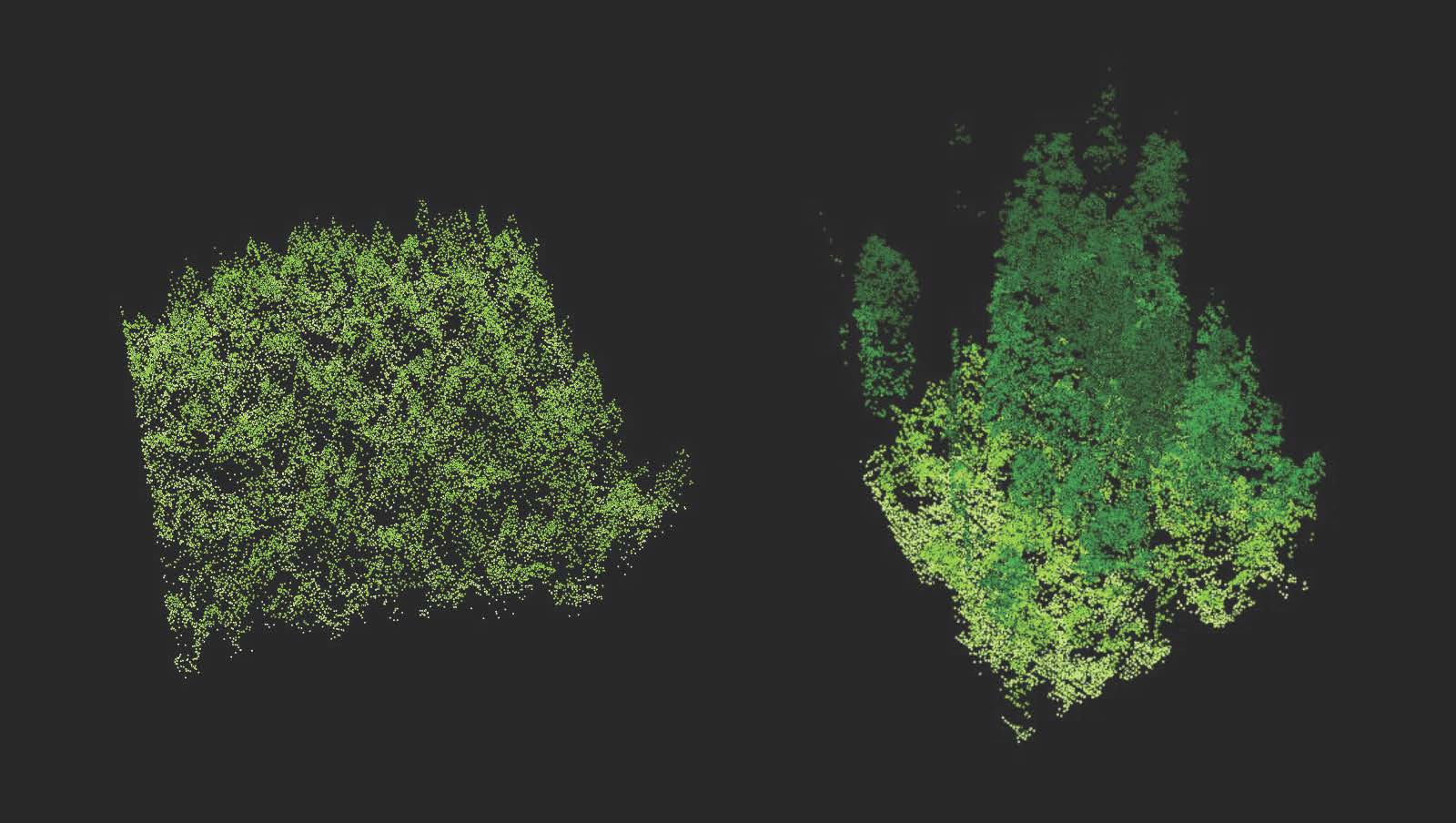
Lidar imaging comparing old-growth forest (right) to a new plantation of trees (left)

Lidar has also found many applications for mapping natural and managed landscapes such as forests, wetlands, and grasslands. Canopy heights, biomass measurements, and leaf area can all be studied using airborne lidar systems. Similarly, lidar is also used by many industries, including Energy and Railroad, and the Department of Transportation as a faster way of surveying. Topographic maps can also be generated readily from lidar, including for recreational use such as in the production of orienteering maps. Lidar has also been applied to estimate and assess the biodiversity of plants, fungi, and animals. Using southern bull kelp in New Zealand, coastal lidar mapping data has been compared with population genomic evidence to form hypotheses regarding the occurrence and timing of prehistoric earthquake uplift events.

=== Geology and soil science ===
High-resolution digital elevation maps generated by airborne and stationary lidar have led to significant advances in geomorphology (the branch of geoscience concerned with the origin and evolution of the Earth surface topography). The lidar abilities to detect subtle topographic features such as river terraces and river channel banks, glacial landforms, to measure the land-surface elevation beneath the vegetation canopy, to better resolve spatial derivatives of elevation, to rockfall detection, to detect elevation changes between repeat surveys have enabled many novel studies of the physical and chemical processes that shape landscapes. In 2005 the Tour Ronde in the Mont Blanc massif became the first high alpine mountain on which lidar was employed to monitor the increasing occurrence of severe rock-fall over large rock faces allegedly caused by climate change and degradation of permafrost at high altitude.

Lidar is also used in structural geology and geophysics as a combination between airborne lidar and GNSS for the detection and study of faults, for measuring uplift. The output of the two technologies can produce extremely accurate elevation models for terrain – models that can even measure ground elevation through trees. This combination was used most famously to find the location of the Seattle Fault in Washington, United States. This combination also measures uplift at Mount St. Helens by using data from before and after the 2004 uplift. Airborne lidar systems monitor glaciers and have the ability to detect subtle amounts of growth or decline. A satellite-based system, the NASA ICESat, includes a lidar sub-system for this purpose. The NASA Airborne Topographic Mapper is also used extensively to monitor glaciers and perform coastal change analysis. The combination is also used by soil scientists while creating a soil survey. The detailed terrain modeling allows soil scientists to see slope changes and landform breaks which indicate patterns in soil spatial relationships.

=== Rock mechanics ===
Lidar has been widely used in rock mechanics for rock mass characterization and slope change detection. Some important geomechanical properties from the rock mass can be extracted from the 3D point clouds obtained by means of the lidar. Some of these properties are:

- Discontinuity orientation
- Discontinuity spacing and RQD
- Discontinuity aperture
- Discontinuity persistence
- Discontinuity roughness
- Water infiltration

Some of these properties have been used to assess the geomechanical quality of the rock mass through the RMR index. Moreover, as the orientations of discontinuities can be extracted using the existing methodologies, it is possible to assess the geomechanical quality of a rock slope through the SMR index. In addition to this, the comparison of different 3D point clouds from a slope acquired at different times allows researchers to study the changes produced on the scene during this time interval as a result of rockfalls or any other landsliding processes.

=== Surveying ===
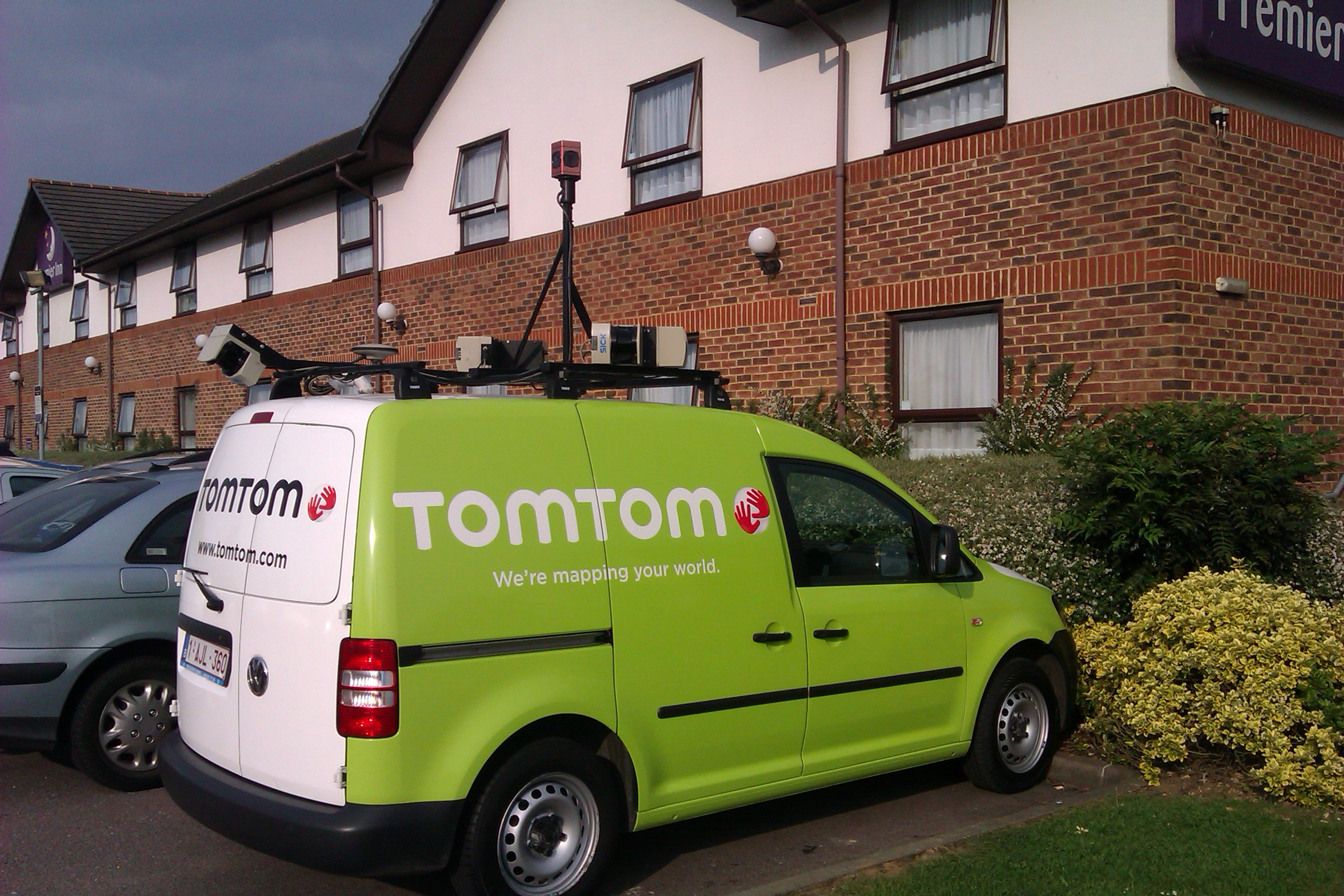
This TomTom mapping van is fitted with five lidar sensors on its roof rack.

Airborne lidar sensors are used by companies in the remote sensing field. They can be used to create a DTM (digital terrain model) or DEM (digital elevation model); this is quite a common practice for larger areas as a plane can acquire 3–4 km (2–2 1/2 mi) wide swaths in a single flyover. Greater vertical accuracy of below 50 mm (2 in) can be achieved with a lower flyover, even in forests, where it is able to give the height of the canopy as well as the ground elevation. Typically, a GNSS receiver configured over a georeferenced control point is needed to link the data in with the WGS (World Geodetic System).

Lidar is also in use in hydrographic surveying. Depending upon the clarity of the water lidar can measure depths from 0.9 to 40 m (3 to 131 ft) with a vertical accuracy of 15 cm (6 in) and horizontal accuracy of 2.5 m (8 ft).
