= Moira Gatens =

Australian philosopher and academic

Moira Gatens FAHA FASSA
- Born: 30 June 1954 (age 72); Sydney, Australia
- Occupation: Professor

Academic background
- Education: University of New South Wales (Ph.D)

Academic work
- Institutions: University of Sydney
- Main interests: Feminist philosophy, Political philosophy, Philosophy and Literature

Moira Gatens FAHA FASSA is an Australian academic feminist philosopher and current Challis Professor of Philosophy at the University of Sydney. She previously held the Spinoza Chair at the University of Amsterdam, Netherlands.

== Biography ==
=== Academic career ===
Gatens served as president of the Australasian Association of Philosophy in 2011. She was appointed in her current position as Challis Professor of Philosophy in 2012.

Gatens was elected Fellow of the Academy of the Social Sciences in Australia in 1999 and of the Australian Academy of the Humanities in 2010.

== Select publications ==
- Feminism and Philosophy: Perspectives on Difference and Equality United Kingdom, Polity Press, 1991 ISBN 9780745604701
- Imaginary Bodies: Ethics, Power and Corporeality. United Kingdom: Routledge, 1996. ISBN 978-0415082105
- Feminist Interpretations of Benedict Spinoza. United States: Pennsylvania State University Press, 2009. ISBN 9780271035161
- Spinoza's Hard Path to Freedom. Assen, Netherlands, Royal Van Gorcum, 2011. ISBN 9789023249399
