= University Medal =

Type of award

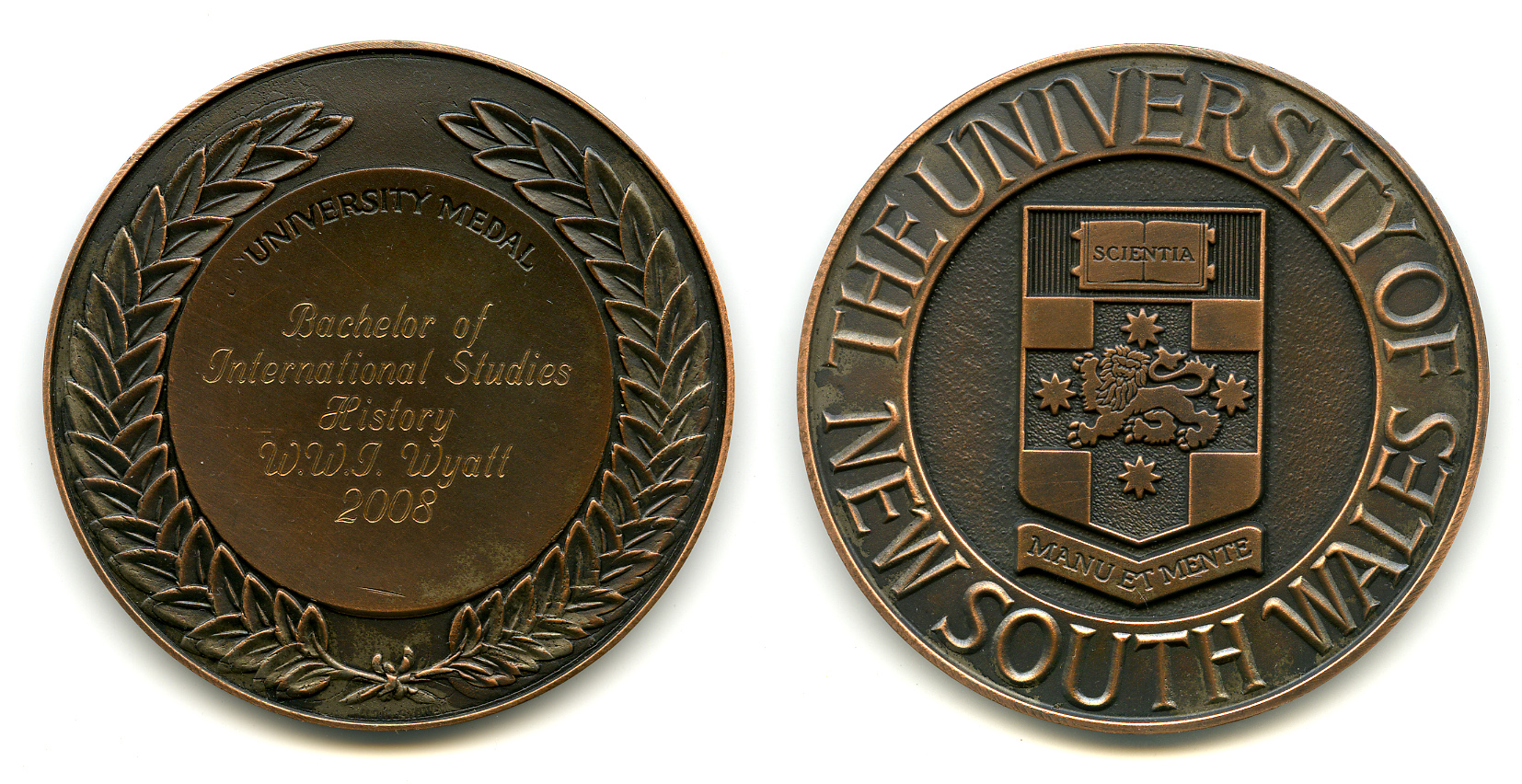
A University Medal from the University of New South Wales.

A University Medal is one of several types of award conferred by universities upon outstanding students or members of staff. The usage and status of university medals differ between countries and between universities.

== As award on graduation ==
Many universities award University Medals to the top undergraduate students upon graduation each year.

=== Australia ===
In Australia, the University Medal is usually awarded upon completion of Honours degrees based on academic merit. The criteria for bestowing the University Medal are stringent. The number of medals awarded might also be limited. For example, the University of New South Wales' medal policy states: "it is expected that only in exceptional circumstances would there be more than one Medal for a particular specialisation". The usual criterion is very high marks across all the subjects undertaken in the 4-year Honours degree. In some universities, the University Medal is treated as a distinct division or class of the Honours degree ("First class Honours and University Medal").

It is rare, but possible, for a student to receive two University Medals, by winning a Medal in each of two undergraduate degrees or majors within a degree. For example, Australian politician and judge H. V. Evatt won University Medals in Philosophy and Law from the University of Sydney, and Brian Anderson, the former President of the Australia Academy of Science and the International Federation of Automatic Control, won University Medals in Engineering and Mathematics from the University of Sydney. Timothy Potts, Director of the J. Paul Getty Museum, won University Medals in Philosophy and Archaeology from the University of Sydney, Sir Cyril Ambrose Walsh, High Court of Australia, won three University Medals, in English and Philosophy and Law at Sydney University.

=== Sri Lanka ===
In Sri Lanka, universities award medals, usually named in honor of a senior faculty member at annual convocations for those who have achieved academic merit.

=== United States ===
The university medal is often awarded to the most distinguished undergraduate student upon graduation. In addition to stringent academic criteria, students are also judged on extracurricular activities, publications, and other qualities.

== As award for service ==
In some universities, the university medal is bestowed upon members of the university for their extraordinary contribution to the University. Such an award is often conferred upon retirement of a staff member.

== Notable university medal winners ==
=== Australian National University ===
- John Quiggin – Economist; Economics.
- Jennifer Robinson – Lawyer; Law

=== Indiana University Bloomington ===
- Elinor Ostrom – Economist; Economics.
- Vincent Ostrom – Economist; Economics.

=== Stony Brook University ===
- Joe Nathan – Baseball player; Athletics.

=== University of Queensland ===
- Joshua Gans – Economist; Economics
- Patrick Keane – Justice of the High Court of Australia; Law.

=== University of Sydney ===
- Sir Edmund Barton – first Prime Minister of Australia and Justice of the High Court of Australia; Classics.
- Sir Garfield Barwick – Chief Justice of the High Court of Australia; Law.
- Sir John Cornforth – Organic chemist and Nobel Prize Winner in Chemistry; Chemistry.
- H. V. Evatt – Politician and judge; Philosophy and Law.
- Emeritus Professor Hans Freeman – Bio-inorganic chemist and protein crystallographer; Chemistry.
- Sir John Kerr – Judge and governor-general; Law.
- Sir Percy Spender – Jurist and politician; Law.
- Major General Sir William John Victor Windeyer – Justice of the High Court and Privy Council
- Robert Sinnerbrink; Australian philosopher and Associate Professor of Philosophy at Macquarie University; Philosophy.
- Geordie Williamson; – FRS, FAA; mathematician; Geometric Representation Theory; Director of the Sydney Mathematical Research Institute
- Sir Cyril Walsh, Justice of the High Court and Privy Council, Medals in English, Philosophy and Law at Sydney University

== See also ==
- Chancellor's Gold Medal
