= André Guelfi =

French racing driver (1919–2016)

- Born: 6 May 1919; Mazagan, Morocco
- Died: 28 June 2016 (aged 97)

Formula One World Championship career
- Nationality: (France) French
- Active years: 1958
- Team: privateer Cooper
- Entries: 1
- Championships: 0
- Wins: 0
- Podiums: 0
- Career points: 0
- Pole positions: 0
- Fastest laps: 0
- First entry: 1958 Moroccan Grand Prix

André Guelfi (6 May 1919 – 28 June 2016) was a French racing driver. He was born in Mazagan, Morocco. He participated in one Formula One World Championship race, on 19 October 1958. He also participated in several non-championship Formula One races. At the time of his death, he was the oldest living Formula One driver and had been since the death of Robert La Caze on 1 July 2015.

== Complete Formula One World Championship results ==
(key)

Year	Entrant	Chassis	Engine	1	2	3	4	5	6	7	8	9	10	11	WDC	Points
1958	André Guelfi	Cooper T45 (F2)	Climax 1.5l Straight-4	ARG	MON	NED	500	BEL	FRA	GBR	GER	POR	ITA	MOR; 15	NC	0
