= Marguerite La Caze =

Australian philosopher

- Awards: Australian Research Fellow

Education
- Education: The University of Queensland
- Thesis: The analytic imaginary (1996)

Philosophical work
- Era: 21st-century philosophy
- Region: Western philosophy
- School: Continental
- Institutions: The University of Queensland
- Main interests: feminist philosophy, aesthetics

Marguerite La Caze is an Australian philosopher and Professor of Philosophy at the University of Queensland. She is an Australian Research Fellow and a former Chair of the Australasian Society for Continental Philosophy (2010–2013). La Caze is known for her research on feminist philosophy and aesthetics.

== Bibliography ==
- La Caze, Marguerite (1994). Emotional responses in context : Jean Rhys' Wide Sargasso sea. Dept. of Philosophy, University of Melbourne.
- La Caze, Marguerite (1999). Freedom and death. Pyrrho Press. ISBN 978-0-85901-875-3.
- La Caze, Marguerite (2000), "Analytic Imaginary" in Deutscher, Max, ed. (2000). Michèle Le Dœuff : operative philosophy and imaginary practice. Humanity Books. ISBN 978-1-57392-863-2.
- La Caze, Marguerite (2000), "Sublimation, love and creativity" in Levine, Michael Philip, ed. (2000). The analytic Freud : philosophy and psychoanalysis. Routledge. ISBN 978-0-415-18039-9.
- La Caze, Marguerite (2002). The analytic imaginary. Cornell University Press. ISBN 978-0-8014-3935-3.
- Dowe, Phil; Nicholls, Moira; Shotton, Leila (2002), La Caze, Marguerite (ed.), Philosophy and the new millennium, Pyrrho Press, ISBN 978-0-85901-940-8
- Integrity and the fragile self, Ashgate, 2003
  - Cox, Damian; La Caze, Marguerite; Levine, Michael Phillip (2018) [2003]. Integrity and the fragile self. Routledge. ISBN 978-1-351-75426-2.
- La Caze, Marguerite (2004), "If you say so: feminist philosophy and antiracism" in Pataki, Tamas; Levine, Michael Phillip (2004). Racism in mind. Cornell University Press. ISBN 978-0-8014-8878-8.
- La Caze, Marguerite (2006), "Splitting the difference: between Young and Fraser on identity politics" in Burns, Lynda, ed. (2006). Feminist alliances. Rodopi. ISBN 978-94-012-0172-8.
- La Caze, Marguerite (2011), "A Taste for Fashion" in Allhoff, Fritz (2011). Wolfendale, Jessica; Kennett, Jeanette (eds.). Fashion : philosophy for everyone : thinking with style. Wiley-Blackwell. ISBN 978-1-4443-4554-4.
- La Caze, Marguerite (2011), "Existentialism, Feminism and Sexuality" in Joseph, Felicity; Woodward, Ashley; Reynolds, Jack, eds. (2011). The Continuum companion to existentialism. Continuum. ISBN 978-1-306-84422-2.
- La Caze, Marguerite (2011), "The Miraculous Power of Forgiveness and the Promise" in Yeatman, Anna, ed. (21 April 2011). Action and appearance : ethics and the politics of writing in Hannah Arendt. Continuum. ISBN 978-1-4411-4260-3.
- La Caze, Marguerite; ProQuest (Firm) (2013). Wonder and Generosity : Their Role in Ethics and Politics. State University of New York Press. ISBN 978-1-4384-4677-6.
- La Caze, Marguerite, ed. (2018). Phenomenology and forgiveness. Rowman & Littlefield International. ISBN 978-1-78660-779-9.
- La Caze, Marguerite (2019). Ethical restoration after communal violence : the grieving and the unrepentant. Lexington Books. ISBN 978-1-4985-2670-8.
