= Richard Colledge =

Australian philosopher

Richard J. Colledge

Education
- Education: University of Queensland (Ph.D.); Katholieke Universiteit Leuven (M.A.)
- Thesis: Beyond Alethia: A Critique of Heideggerian Einaiology (2006)
- Doctoral advisor: Aurelia Armstrong

Philosophical work
- Era: 21st-century philosophy
- Region: Western philosophy
- School: Continental
- Institutions: Australian Catholic University
- Main interests: ontology, hermeneutics

Richard J. Colledge is an Australian philosopher and Head of the School of Philosophy at Australian Catholic University. He is the Chair of the Australasian Society for Continental Philosophy. Colledge is known for his research on Heidegger and Kierkegaard.
