= Daniel Cazés =

Mexican anthropologist and professor

Daniel Cazés Menache (13 September 1939, México City – 20 December 2012) was a Mexican anthropologist and gender studies scholar.

== Works ==
- "Indigenismo en México. Pasado y presente", en Historia y sociedad (1963)
- "El pueblo matlatzinca de San Francisco Oxtotilpan y su lengua" (1965)
- prólogo de El desarrollo del subdesarrollo, de A. G. Frank (1967)
- Tres culturas en agonía (con S. Arguedas, F. Carmona y J. Carrión, 1969)
- Los revolucionarios (1971)
- Epigraphie Maya et linguistique mayanne (París, 1975)
- "Memorias de mi relación con el feminismo y las feministas", en Fem (1981)
- La Universidad Autónoma de Puebla en 1981 (introducción y coordinación, 4 tt., 1984–1985)
- La restructuración de la Universidad Autónoma de Puebla (1984)
- "Con el feminismo en casa" en DobleJornada (1989), suplemento del periódico La Jornada
- "Democracia y desmasificación en la universidad pública", en Universidad Nacional y democracia, de S. Zermeño, cooordinador (1991)
- Relato a muchas voces. Memorial del 68 (selección, edición y prólogo), Serie Atrás de la Raya. Desarrollo de Medios/La Jornada, 2a. ed., México (junio 1994), y Una crónica del 68
- "Normas del hombre verdadero en Kafka y Sartre. Pasos para una metodología de la masculinidad crítica", en Actas del XIII Congreso Internacional de Ciencias Antropológicas y Etnológicas
- "Desesperanza y posmodernidad. A 48 años de Hiroshima y Nagasaki", en "La Jornada Semanal", suplemento dominical de La Jornada (1993)
- "God y Alá", en "La Jornada Semanal", suplemento dominical de La Jornada (1993)
- "Autonomía universitaria y Estado en México", en El nuevo Estado mexicano, coord. J. Alonso
- Tecnología ciudadana para la democracia (con E. Calderón)
- "La dimensión social del género: posibilidades de vida para mujeres y hombres en el patriarcado", en Antología de la Sexualidad Humana
- "Masculinidad y pareja en la Carta al padre de Kafka", en La pareja o Hasta que la muerte nos separe: ¿Un sueño imposible?, coord. T. Döring (1994)
- Volver a nacer. Memorial del 85 (introducción y coordinación)
- "Desmasificación universitaria", en Democracia y pluralidad en la universidad
- "Masculinidades de hoy: realidad y alternativas", en DobleJornada (1995), suplemento del periódico La Jornada
- Las elecciones presidenciales de 1994 (con E. Calderón), Testimonios de observadores. Memorial de las elecciones de 1994 (estudios y coordinación), Metodología de la observación ciudadana, libro electrónico, coordinación, Prólogo a Democracia y medios: un binomio inexplorado de F. Toussaint, y Directorio Electrónico Nacional de la Investigación en Ciencias y Humanidades (1996)
- «Metodología de género en los estudios de hombres», en "La investigación sobre las mujeres en América Latina (Managua y Guadalajara)", capítulo 6 de Las alzadas, coord. S. Lovera y N. Palomo
- "Taller de género", con M. Lagarde (1997)
- "Memorial de Chiapas. Pedacitos de historia" (convocatoria y coordinación)
- "La creación de alternativas" (estudio preliminar y coordinación)
- "El DF en 1997: los retos del gobierno y de la sociedad civil" (coordinación con L. Álvarez) (1997)
- "1968 en 1998", guión para la escenificación en la exposición 30 años después en la UNAM
- "El 68 en 1998". Revista X, "Work among men in Latin America. Investigation and practices, results and experiences" en Seminar on men, family formation and reproduction (Lieja-Buenos Aires)
- La creación de Subdelegaciones de Cultura, Educación y Género en las Delegaciones del Gobierno de la Ciudad de México, Tlalpan DF
- "El feminismo y los hombres", Revista UNAM y "La perspectiva de género. Guía para la formulación, la puesta en marcha, el seguimiento y la evaluación de investigaciones y acciones gubernamentales y cívicas" (con la asesoría de M. Lagarde y la colaboración de B. Lagarde, 1998)
- "Paternidades vividas y paternidades vislumbradas al final del milenio", en Coloquio del Día del Padre, y "Algunos hombres en El segundo sexo" en Jornadas de Homenaje a S. de Beauvoir en el 50 aniversario de la publicación de El segundo sexo (Buenos Aires, 1999).
