= Malcolm Colledge =

British archaeologist

Malcolm Andrew Richard Colledge
- Born: October 12, 1939
- Died: June 22, 2015 (aged 75)
- Occupation: Archaeologist

Malcolm Andrew Richard Colledge (12 October 1939 – 22 June 2015) was a British archaeologist who specialized in the art of Palmyra. He made numerous visits to the Middle East and conducted extensive research in the region. Colledge faced arrests during his archaeological work in Jordan and Turkmenistan.

== Early life ==
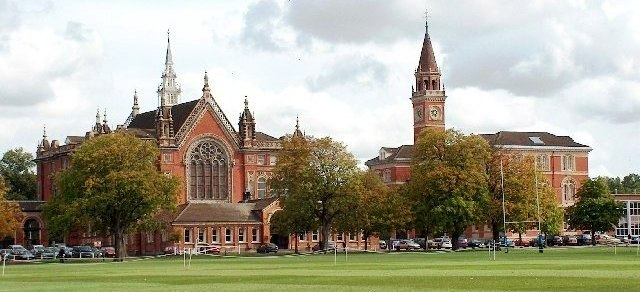
Dulwich College

Colledge was born on 12 October 1939. His father was an estate agent who by then was serving in the British Army. He had two brothers and a sister and was raised in Croydon. He attended Dulwich College on a scholarship where, as a 12 year old, he heard a lecture by the archaeologist Mortimer Wheeler that he said caused him to become "hooked" on archaeology for life. Colledge attended St John's College, Cambridge, and graduated with a degree in classics and archaeology in 1961.

== Career ==
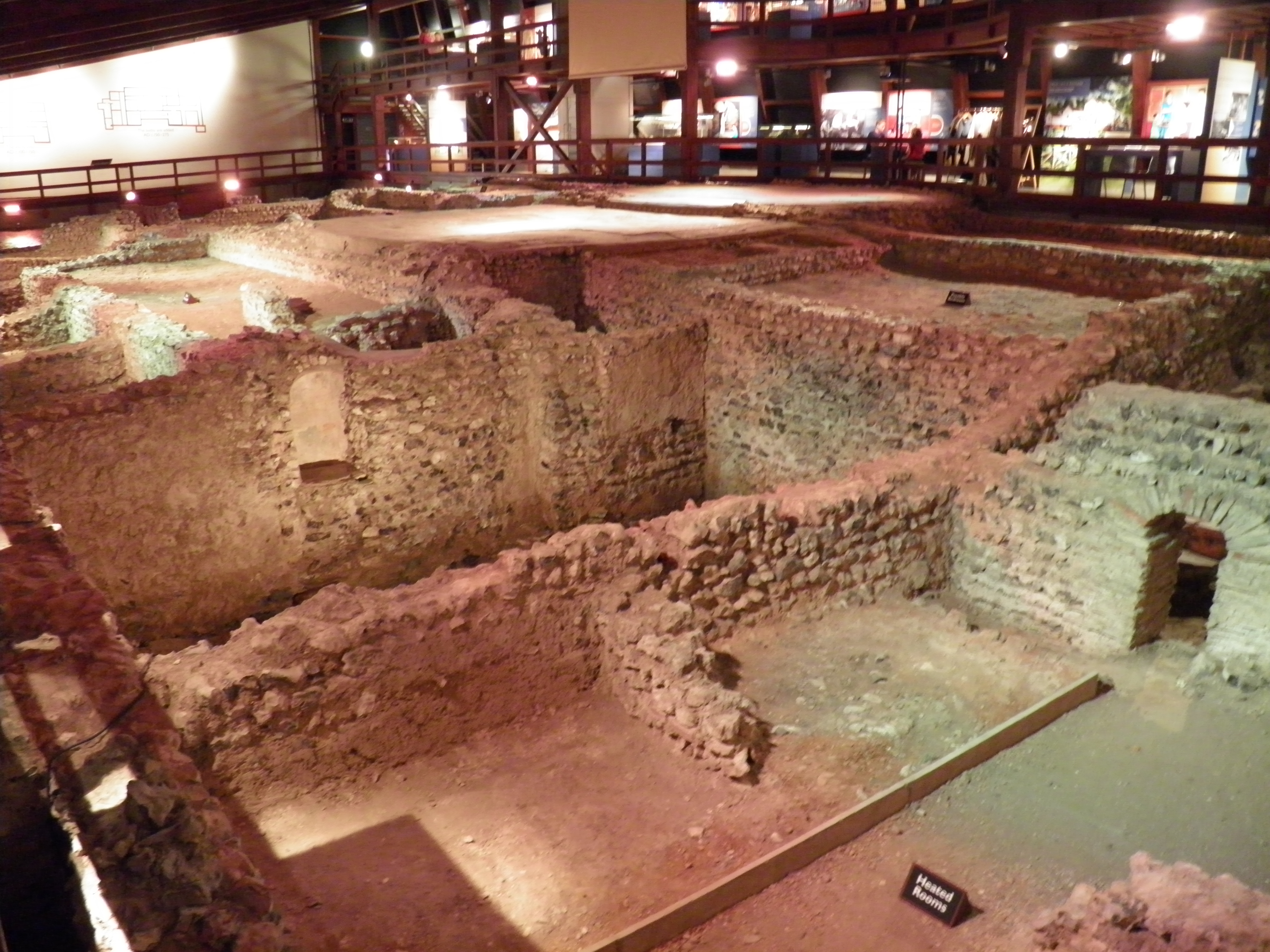
The excavations at Lullingstone Roman Villa in 2012.

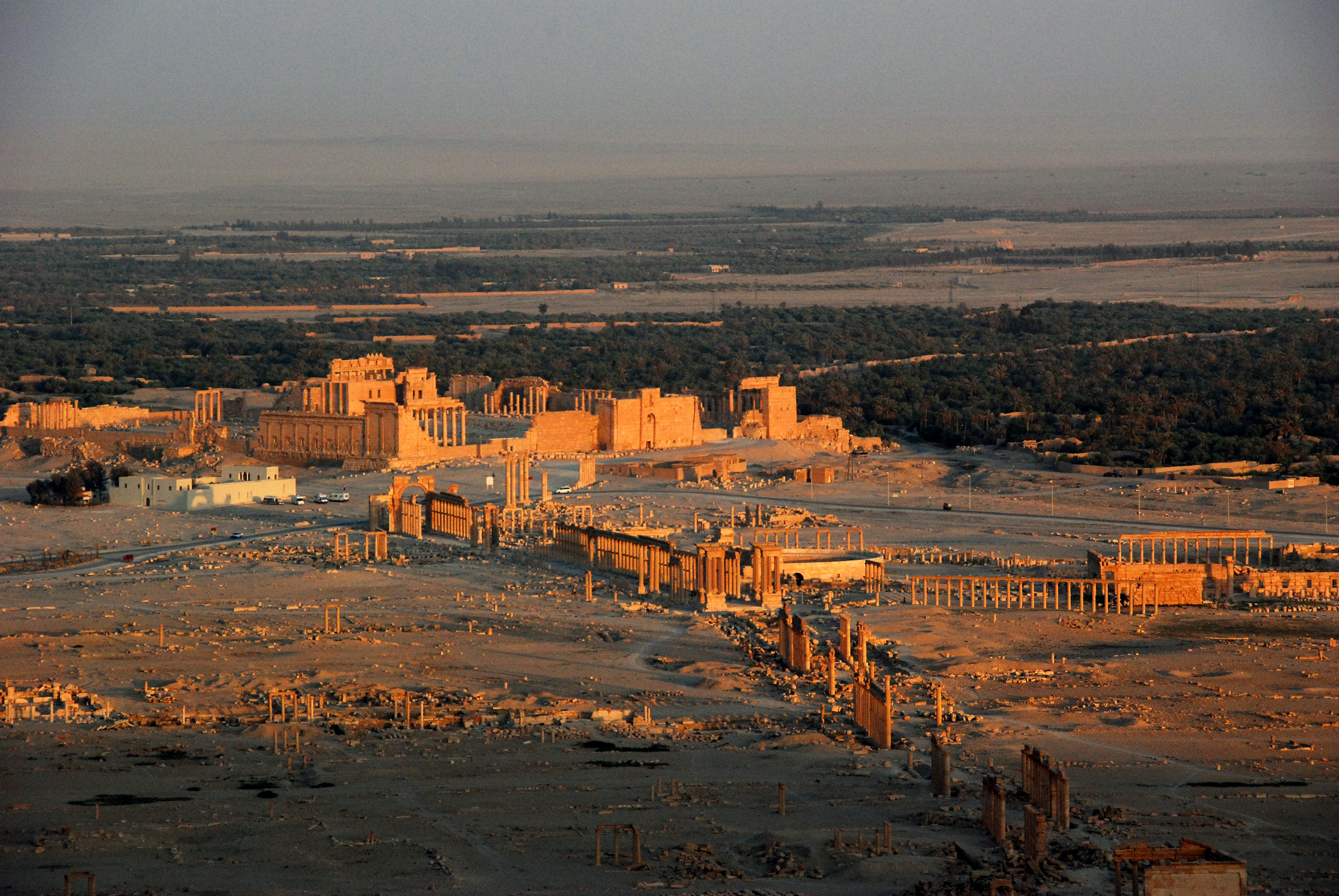
Palmyra in 2008.

Colledge's first experience of an archaeological dig was at Lullingstone Roman Villa in the late 1950s. He later recalled that Lt.-Col. Geoffrey Meates, who was in charge of the site, ran the excavations with military discipline. In 1960, Colledge visited the Middle East for the first time, travelling to Syria and Jordan. In 1961 he joined Charles Burney's dig at Yanik Tepe in Iran and later at Petra where Colledge supervised the uncovering of the main Roman street.

In 1964 he completed his Ph.D. thesis for Cambridge University on Greek and Roman influences in Palmyrene art.

In 1973, Colledge travelled to Iraq where he studied objects in the Iraq Museum and later went to Hatra to study sculptures. He said of first visiting Palmyra that it was "love at first sight". He documented the grave reliefs and architecture and learned the Palmyran dialect of Aramaic. His book The art of Palmyra (1976) is a definitive work on the subject.

Colledge often ventured to areas off the beaten track without official permission. In 1985 he was arrested in Jordan after accidentally walking into a restricted area and detained in an underground prison for several days before he was released by a colonel. In 1992 he was arrested in Nysa in Turkmenistan while attending a conference, eventually being released after convincing his captors that he was in the country as a guest of their president.

In England, Colledge became head of the department of classics at Westfield College and Queen Mary College, University of London. With Josef Wiesehöfer he wrote articles in the Oxford Classical Dictionary on "Ctesiphon", "Hatra", "Hecatompylus", "Nisa", and "Palmyra".

== Personal life ==
Colledge married Margaret in 1960 and she accompanied him on many of his overseas trips. They had a son Alexander, named after Alexander the Great who was one of Colledge's heroes, but the couple divorced in 1966. Soon after, Colledge married Maria Gomez-Cristobal, a teacher of Spanish.

Colledge was diagnosed with Huntington's disease in 1995.

== Death ==
Colledge died on 22 June 2015, unaware of ISIS actions in Palmyra.

== Selected publications ==
- The Parthians, Thames & Hudson, London, 1967. (Ancient Peoples And Places)
- The art of Palmyra, Thames and Hudson, London, 1976; Westview Press, Boulder, 1976. ISBN 0500690030 (Studies in Ancient Art and Archaeology)
- Parthian art, Elek, London, 1977. (Elek Archaeology and Anthropology) ISBN 0236400851
- Greece and Italy in the classical world: Acta of the XI International Congress of Classical Archaeology [held in] London, 3–9 September 1978, under the sponsorship of the British Academy, British Academy for the International Association for Classical Archaeology, 1979. (Editor with J.N. Coldstream).
- How to recognize Roman art, Macdonald Educational, London, 1979. ISBN 0356059820
- The Parthian period, Brill, Leiden, 1986. ISBN 9004071156 (Iconography of Religions. Section 14, Iran; Fasc. 3)
- "Parthian cultural elements at Roman Palmyra", in Mesopotamia, No. 22 (1987), pp. 19–28.
- "Greek and non-Greek interaction in the art and architecture of the Hellenistic East" in Amélie Kuhrt & Susan Sherwin-White (Eds.), Hellenism in the East, Duckworth, London, 1987, pp. 134–162. ISBN 0715621254
