= Australasian Society for Continental Philosophy =

- Founders: Graham Jones, Paul Atkinson, Ralph Humphries, Andrew Lewis, Clive Madder, Michael Fagenblatt, Simon Cooper, Melissa McMahon
- Established: 1995
- President: Charles Barbour
- Website: www.ascp.org.au

Australasian Society for Continental Philosophy (ASCP) is a society dedicated to providing a broad intellectual forum for the scholars researching in continental philosophy. The society was established in Melbourne in 1995. Charles Barbour is the chair of the society. The Society is the successor of the defunct Australian Association of Phenomenology and Social Philosophy (AAPSP)

== Chairs ==
- Robert Sinnerbrink (2007-2010)
- Marguerite La Caze (2010-2013)
- Jo Faulkner (2013-2016)
- Simone Bignall (2016-2018)
- Richard Colledge
- Dimitris Vardoulakis
- Charles Barbour
