= Robert La Caze =

Moroccan and French racing driver (1917–2015)

- روبير لا كاز
- La Caze in 1954
- Born: 26 February 1917; Paris, France
- Died: 1 July 2015 (aged 98); Le Cannet, Alpes-Maritimes, France

Formula One World Championship career
- Nationality: (Morocco) Moroccan
- Active years: 1958
- Team: Privateer Cooper
- Entries: 1
- Championships: 0
- Wins: 0
- Podiums: 0
- Career points: 0
- Pole positions: 0
- Fastest laps: 0
- First entry: 1958 Moroccan Grand Prix

24 Hours of Le Mans career
- Years: 1957, 1959–1960
- Teams: Gordini, Porsche
- Best finish: DNF (1957, 1959, 1960)
- Class wins: 0

Robert La Caze (Note: Sometimes spelled Robert La Gaze.) (Moroccan Arabic: روبير لا كاز, pronounced [ʁɔbɛʁ la kaz]; 26 February 1917 – 1 July 2015) was a Moroccan and French racing driver, who competed under the Moroccan flag in Formula One at the Moroccan Grand Prix in 1958. La Caze remains the only Moroccan driver to compete in Formula One. (Note: André Guelfi was born in Morocco but competed in Formula One under the French flag.) In rallying, La Caze was a two-time winner of the Rallye du Maroc in 1954 and 1967.

Born in Paris and raised in Morocco, La Caze started his career in rallying across North Africa, also winning a national title in skiing. Following World War II, La Caze competed in sportscar racing, finishing third at the 12 Hours of Casablanca in 1952, and winning the 3 Hours of Safi the following year. In 1954, La Caze won two classes at the Marrakesh Grand Prix, another class at the Tangier Grand Prix, and won the Rallye du Maroc in a Simca Aronde. He became a class winner at the Agadir Grand Prix in 1955, also finishing runner-up in the Rallye that year. In Europe, he further competed in the 1955 Mille Miglia, 1956 Tour de France Automobile and the 1957 24 Hours of Le Mans, the latter with Gordini.

La Caze became the first driver to compete in Formula One under an African licence at the 1958 Moroccan Grand Prix, entering a Cooper T45 as a privateer and finishing fourteenth in his Formula Two machinery. La Caze returned to Le Mans in 1959 and 1960, driving a Porsche 550 and 718, respectively. La Caze won his second Rallye in 1967 in a Renault 8 Gordini.

Upon retiring from motor racing the following year, La Caze operated a garage and youth sports organisation in Marrakesh until his death in 2015, aged 98.

== Career ==
=== Early life ===
La Caze was born in Paris, but as the grandson of a French diplomat, he moved to Morocco at a young age and spent most of his life there. He started his motorsport career in rallying, taking part in many events across North Africa. He also became the Moroccan national skiing champion.

=== Sportscar races and rallies in Morocco ===
International motorsport returned to Morocco after the Second World War in the form of a sportscar race, the Agadir Grand Prix. The event was held from 1950 to 1956, each year featuring multiple races for different engine classes. In 1951, he placed third in the S750 race. In 1952, he placed second in the S1.0 race. In 1953, he placed second in the S1.1 and S2.0 races. In 1954, he placed second in the S1.1 race. In 1955, he won the S1.0 race. In 1956, he set the fastest practice time for the S1.3 race but his final result is unclear; he finished 8th in the feature race.

In 1951, La Caze participated in the Rallye du Maroc and finished sixth. In 1952, he finished third in the 12 Hours of Casablanca. In 1953, he won the 3 Hours of Safi and started the 3 Hours of Algeria and 12 Hours of Casablanca, but his result in either race is unclear. 1954 was particularly successful: he won the S1.1 and S1.5 races at the Marrakech Grand Prix, the S1.6 race at the Tangier Grand Prix, and the Rallye du Maroc for the first time. He was runner-up in the rally in 1955. Outside of Morocco, La Caze raced in the 1955 Mille Miglia, the 1956 Tour de France and the 1957 24 Hours of Le Mans.

=== Moroccan Grand Prix ===
The Moroccan Grand Prix returned in 1957, but it was run to Formula One regulations and local competitors could not afford to enter. The event organisers remedied this for the 1958 event, allowing Formula Two cars to enter in a separate class. La Caze secured an F2 entry with a privately owned Cooper. He qualified fourth out of the F2 entries and steadily improved his pace throughout the race, making a late pass on André Guelfi to secure third in the F2 class and 14th overall. However, the race was marred by Stuart Lewis-Evans's accident which ultimately proved to be fatal, and the Moroccan Grand Prix would not return.

=== Last races and later career ===
La Caze raced four times alongside Jean Kerguen, who had also been part of the Moroccan Grand Prix F2 field. In 1959, they competed at Le Mans and the Tour de France, finishing fourth overall in the latter. In 1960, they drove to 14th overall in the Rally Isla de Gran Canaria before returning to Le Mans. La Caze won the Rallye du Maroc for the second time in 1967, and drove again in 1968 but retired with an accident.

Following his motorsport career, La Caze ran a garage and a youth sports association in Marrakech. He was the oldest living World Championship driver from the death of Paul Pietsch in May 2012 until his own death in July 2015.

== Racing record ==
=== Complete Formula One results ===
(key)

Year	Entrant	Chassis	Engine	1	2	3	4	5	6	7	8	9	10	11	WDC	Points
1958	Robert La Caze	Cooper T45 (F2)	Climax Straight-4	ARG	MON	NED	500	BEL	FRA	GBR	GER	POR	ITA	MOR; 14	NC	0

=== Complete 24 Hours of Le Mans results ===
Year	Team	Co-Drivers	Car	Class	Laps	Pos.	Class Pos.
1957	(France) Automobiles Gordini	(France) Clarence de Rinen	Gordini T15S	S2.0	3	DNF (Engine)	
1959	(France) J. Kerguen (private entrant)	(France) Jean Kerguen	Porsche 550A	S1.5	229	DNF (Clutch)	
1960	(France) J. Kerguen (private entrant)	(France) Jean Kerguen	Porsche 718 RS60/4	S1.6	92	DNF (Camshaft)	
