= Ferrari Monza =

Series of race cars

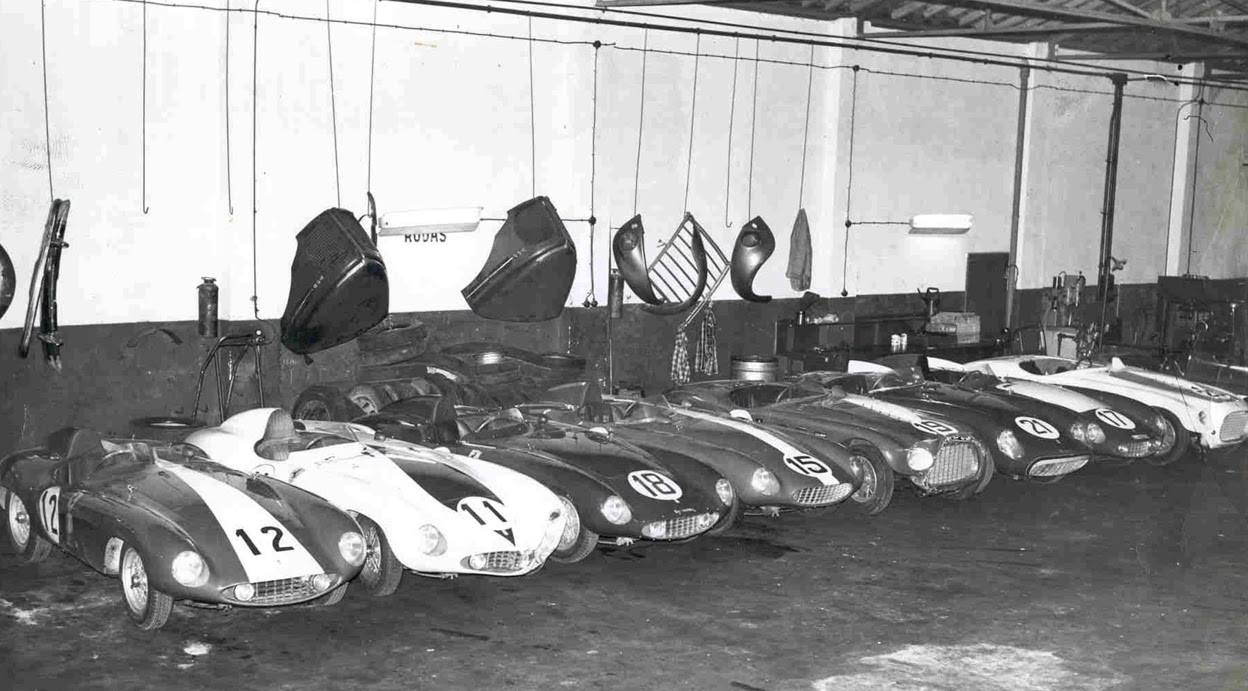

Overview
- Manufacturer: Ferrari
- Also called: Ferrari TF; Ferrari Mondial
- Production: 1953–1957

Body and chassis
- Class: World Sportscar Championship
- Layout: Front mid-engine, rear-wheel-drive

Powertrain
- Engine: Lampredi I4

Dimensions
- Wheelbase: 2,250 mm (88.6 in)

Chronology
- Predecessor: Ferrari 250 MM
- Successor: Ferrari 250 Testa Rossa

Ferrari Monza is a series of race cars built by Ferrari in the 1950s. For the 1952 and 1953 Formula One seasons contested to Formula Two rules with a maximum capacity of 2000cc, Scuderia Ferrari shifted from using the compact Gioacchino Colombo-designed V12 engine in its smallest class of sports racers to a line of four-cylinder engines designed by Aurelio Lampredi. This led to the Ferrari Tipo 500 with 500cc per cylinder. The 1953 version with same 500 cylinder size was called 553.

For the 1954 Formula One season, new F1 rules allowed 2500cc, and Ferrari bored out the engine to 625cc per cylinder. Inspired by the success of the light and reliable 2.5 L 553 F1 car, the four-cylinder sports racers competed successfully through the late 1950s, culminating with the famed 500 Mondial and 750 Monza.

While the usual Ferrari V12 models used downdraft carburettors located centrally in the "valley" of the V engine, the inline-engined fours used side-draft units and thus did not need the hood scoops.

Almost all Monzas had 2,250 mm (88.6 in) of wheelbase, except for 250 and 860 Monza.

== 1953 ==
1953 was a breakout year for Ferrari, beginning with the new World Sportscar Championship series. The company augmented their traditional V12-powered 250 MM with the new 340 MM and 375 MM and introduced the new four-cylinder 625 TF and 735 S models. With this profusion of cars, Ferrari was able to win the first running of the sportscar championship, the 1953 World Sportscar Championship, by winning three of seven races, while four competing brands won one each, and only the four best results were counted.

=== 625 TF ===
Ferrari 625 TF
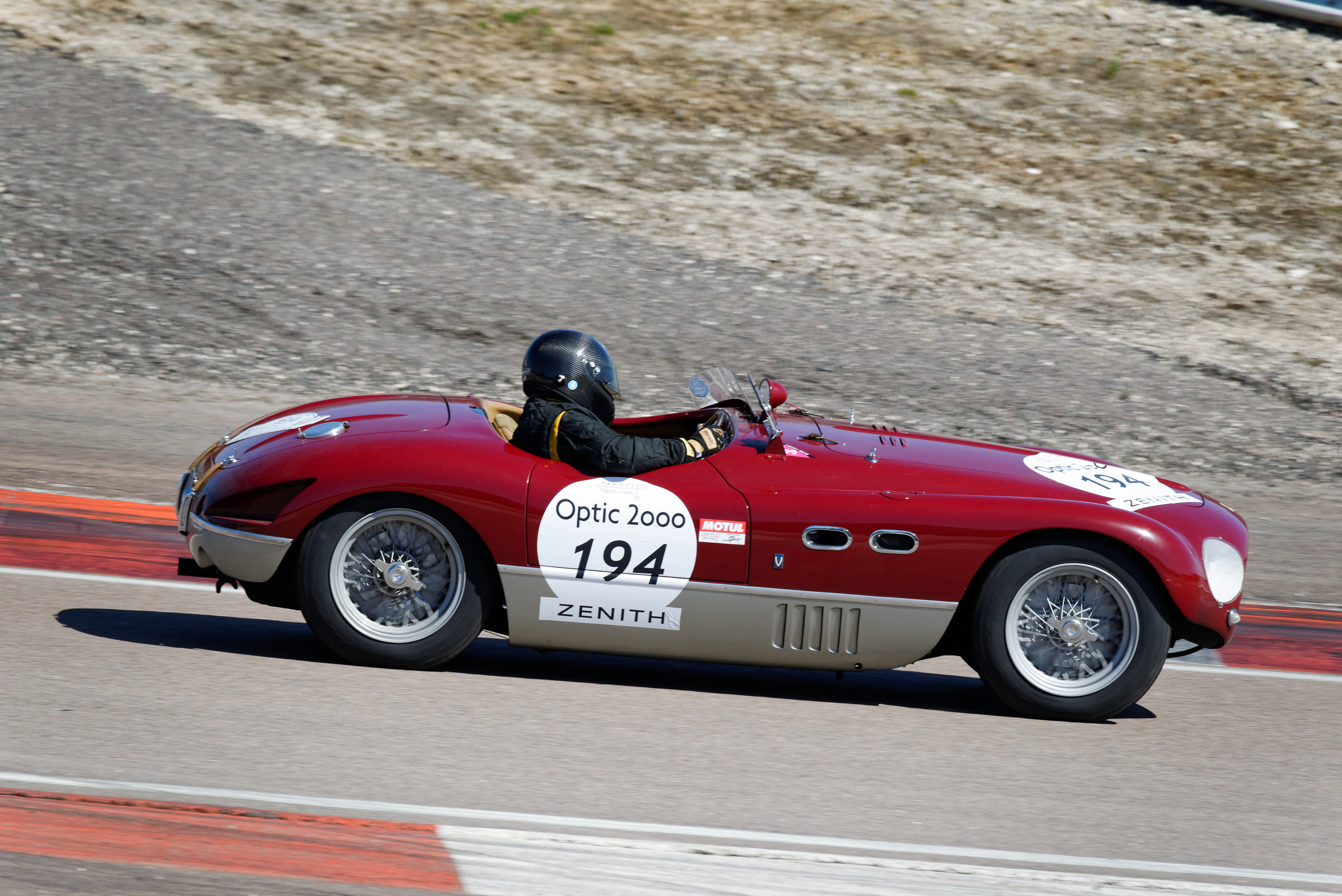

Overview
- Production: 1953

Body and chassis
- Class: WSC racer

Powertrain
- Engine: 2.5 L (2498.32 cc) Lampredi I4

Dimensions
- Curb weight: 730 kg (1610 lb)

Chronology
- Predecessor: Ferrari 250 MM
- Successor: Ferrari 500 Mondial

The first four-cylinder closed-wheel sports racer from Ferrari was the 625 TF of 1953. Resembling the Vignale-designed 250 MM spyder in most respects, the 625 TF used a 2.5 L (2498 cc/152 in^{3}) straight-4 lifted from the 625 F1 car instead of the 250's 3.0 L V12. It was a small car, with the same 2,250 mm (89 in) wheelbase as the 250 but even lighter at 730 kg (1,610 lb). The engine produced 220 hp (164 kW) at 7,000 rpm and could push the little roadster to over 240 km/h (150 mph).

The lightweight car debuted at the hands of Mike Hawthorn at Monza on June 29, 1953. Although it could not keep up on the long straights at that track, Hawthorn still brought the car to fourth place at its debut.

A single closed 625 TF berlinetta, one of the last Ferraris designed and built by Vignale, was created in the Spring of 1953. Per Giulio Vignale, it was destroyed in a fire. There is speculation it was rebodied as a Spyder by Scaglietti in 1954 but this is unconfirmed.

=== 735 S ===
Ferrari 735 S
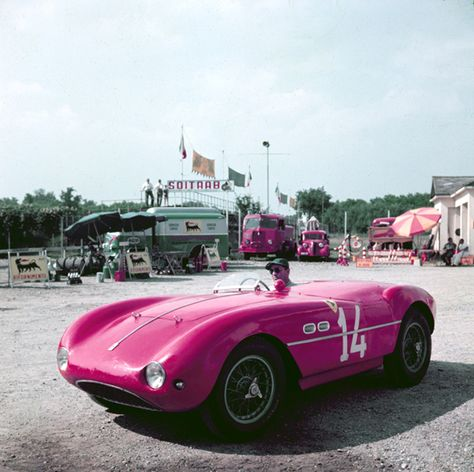

Overview
- Production: 1953

Body and chassis
- Class: WSC racer

Powertrain
- Engine: 2.9 L (2941.66 cc) Lampredi I4

Chronology
- Predecessor: Ferrari 250 MM
- Successor: Ferrari 750 Monza

The same day that the 625 TF debuted, another car was fielded for Alberto Ascari. Sporting an enlarged 2.9 L (2941.66 cc/179 in^{3}) engine, Ascari's 735 S was more capable at Monza, leading the race until he collided with a 250 MM. The 735 S was a barchetta bodied by Carrozzeria Autodromo with recessed headlights, a drooping grille, and fender vents. Pinin Farina and Scaglietti also bodied an example each.

=== 500 Mondial ===
Ferrari 500 Mondial
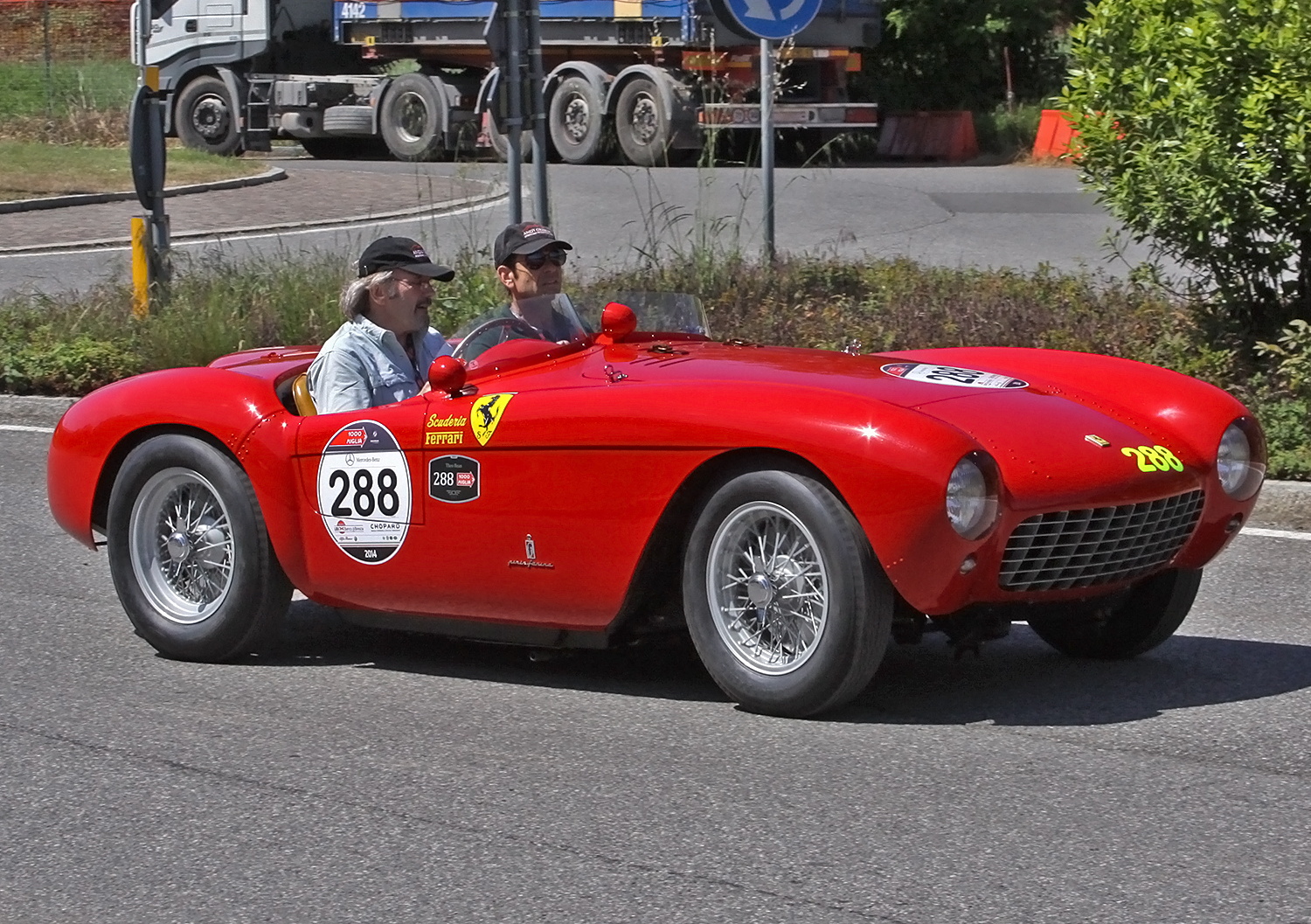

Overview
- Production: 1953–1955

Body and chassis
- Class: WSC racer

Powertrain
- Engine: 2.0 L (1984.86 cc) Lampredi I4

Dimensions
- Curb weight: 720 kg (1,590 lb)

Chronology
- Predecessor: Ferrari 625 TF
- Successor: Ferrari 500 TR

The early experiments with Lampredi's four-cylinder engine led to the creation of the famed 500 Mondial. Named to mark the world ("Mondial") championships won by Alberto Ascari, the 500 Mondial featured a 2.0 L version of Lampredi's four-cylinder engine in a small and light body with an advanced suspension. The car debuted on December 20, 1953, at the 12 Hours of Casablanca driven by Ascari and Luigi Villoresi, placing second to a 375 MM. In 1954 four 500 Mondials were entered in the Mille Miglia race, with best result being second overall after Lancia D24. The Mondial remained competitive through the end of the decade, including an entry in the 1957 Mille Miglia, and was raced as late as 1962, when Javier Valesquez entered chassis 0448MD in the 1962 Carrera Presidential race in Mexico City.

The 500 Mondial's 2.0 L (1984.86 cc/121 in^{3}) engine was taken from the 500 F2 which won the world championship but was detuned to produce 170 hp (127 kW). It was extremely light at 720 kg (1,590 lb). and handled well with a modern de Dion tube rear suspension.

The first 500 Mondials were spiders bodied by Pinin Farina, but Carrozzeria Scaglietti later created a series of barchettas. Two berlinettas were also built by Pinin Farina. 29 were built in total. Of the 13 Pininfarina spiders built, 5 were the earlier Series I version with covered headlights.

The car won the Gran Turismo Trophy at the 2012 Pebble Beach Concours d'Elegance.

== 1954–1955 ==
The 1954 and 1955 seasons were the heyday of the four-cylinder Ferrari sports racer. The company hit its stride, earning the World Sportscar Championship in 1954 and contending in 1955 despite the legendary Mercedes-Benz team. The Ferrari sports car lineup at the beginning of 1954 was made up of the 2.0 L 500 Mondial and 3.0 L 750 Monza. The team replaced the Mondial with the 500 TR later that year, and feverishly worked to hold off Mercedes-Benz, developing the larger 857 S and six-cylinder 118 LM and 121 LM. The planned V12 sports racer family, including the 250 Monza of 1954 and planned 410 S of 1955, were less notable.

=== 750 Monza ===
Ferrari 750 Monza
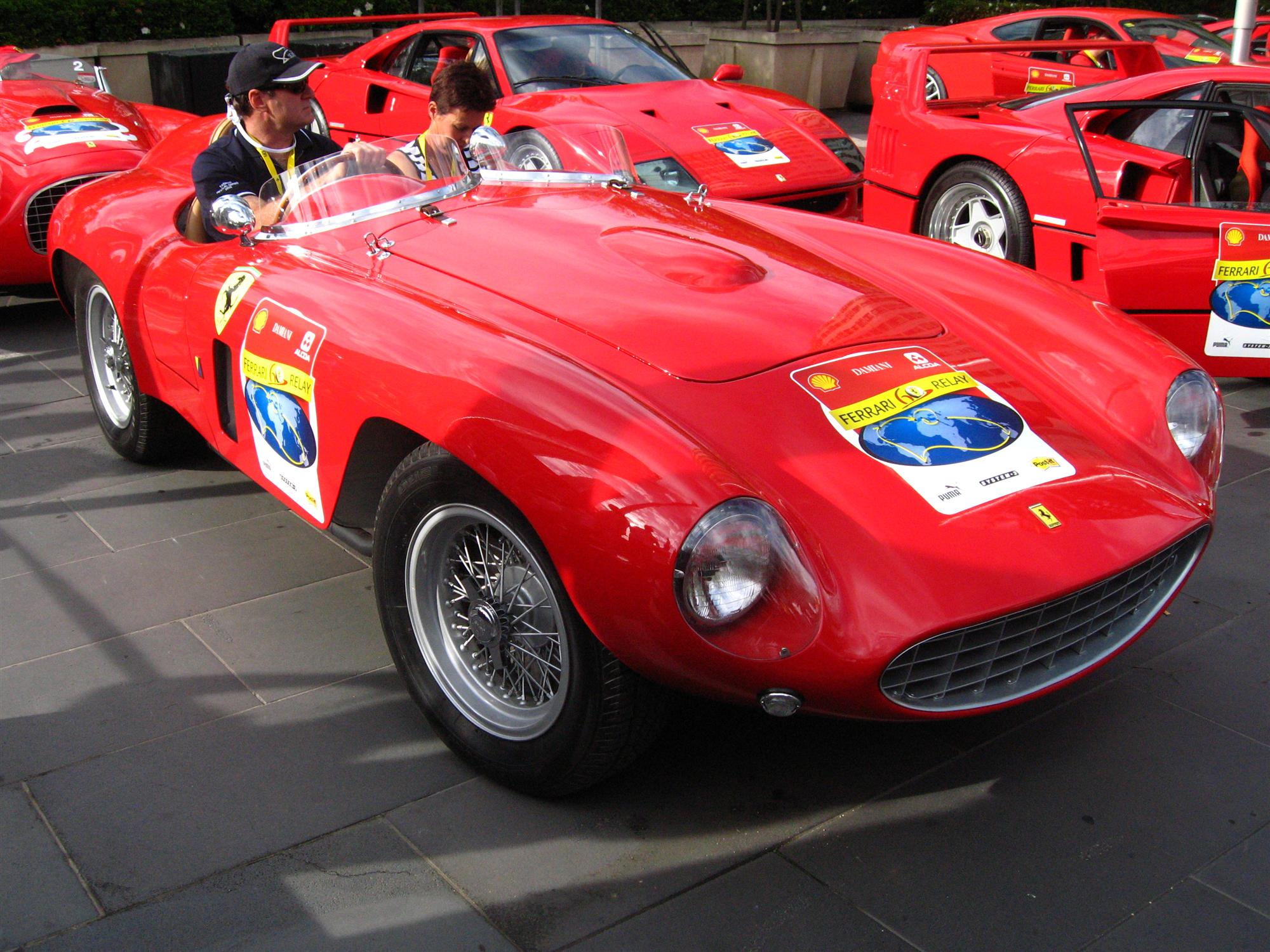

Overview
- Production: 1954

Body and chassis
- Class: WSC racer

Powertrain
- Engine: 3.0 L (2999.62 cc) Lampredi I4

Dimensions
- Curb weight: 760 kg

Chronology
- Predecessor: Ferrari 735 S
- Successor: Ferrari 857 S

1954 saw the introduction of a new four-cylinder sports racer, the 750 Monza. Sporting a three-litre version of the 500 Mondial's engine, the Monza was much more powerful, with 260 PS (191 kW) available, but barely heavier at 760 kg (1,675 lb). The new-style body was penned by Pinin Farina and presaged the droop-nose look of the famed 250 GTO, but it was Scaglietti's 750 Monza, with its faired-in headrest suggesting the flowing Testa Rossa that drew attention.

Alberto Ascari was killed in the car during an impromptu testing session at Monza in 1955.

Mike Hawthorn and Umberto Maglioli piloted their 750 Monza to victory at Monza on its very first race, giving the car its name. Although they were strong on the track, the Monza was unable to hold off the Mercedes-Benz 300 SLR in 1955, allowing the Germans to seize the sports car championship that Ferrari claimed in 1954.

750 Monza at the Museo Ferrari

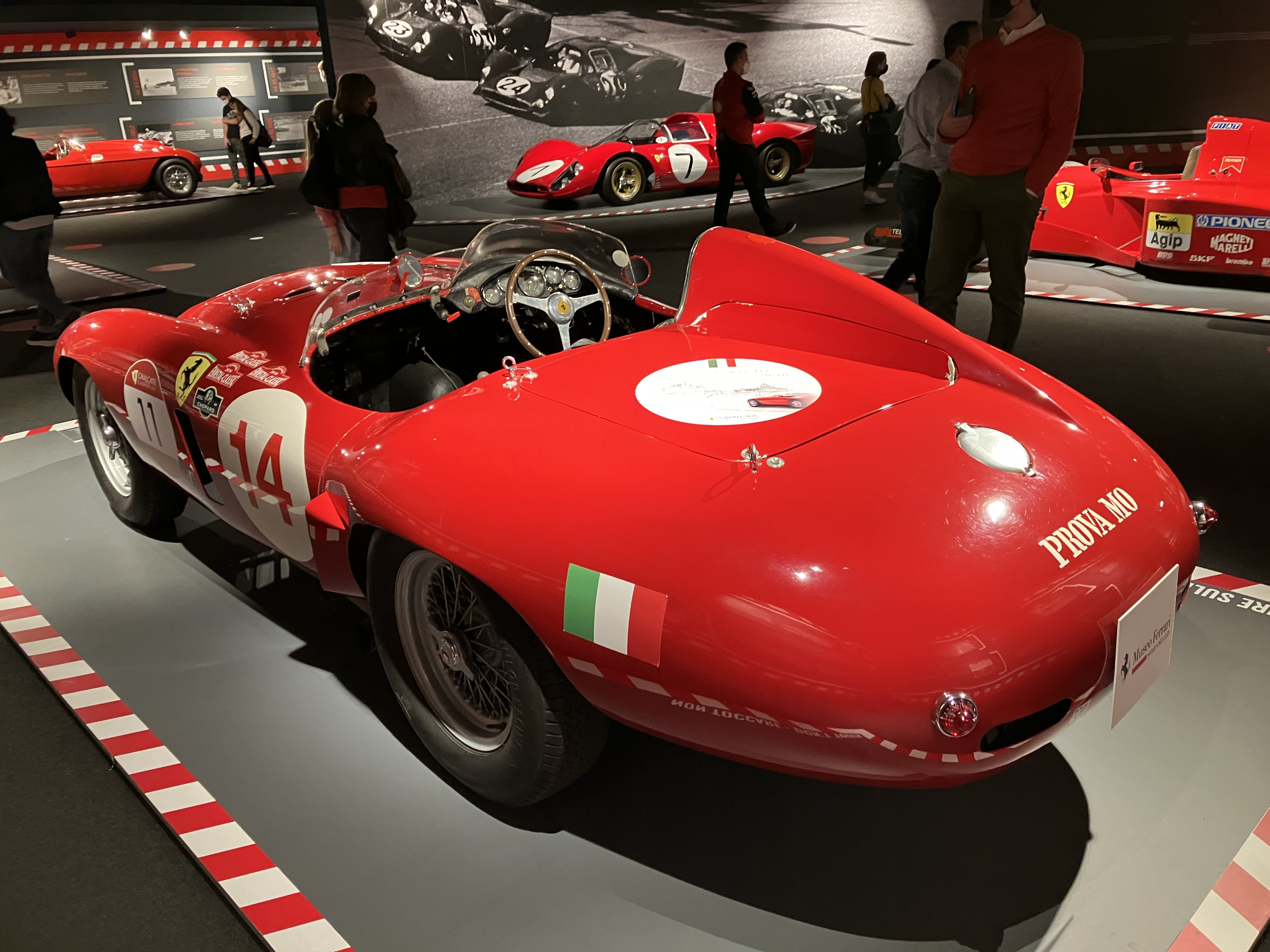

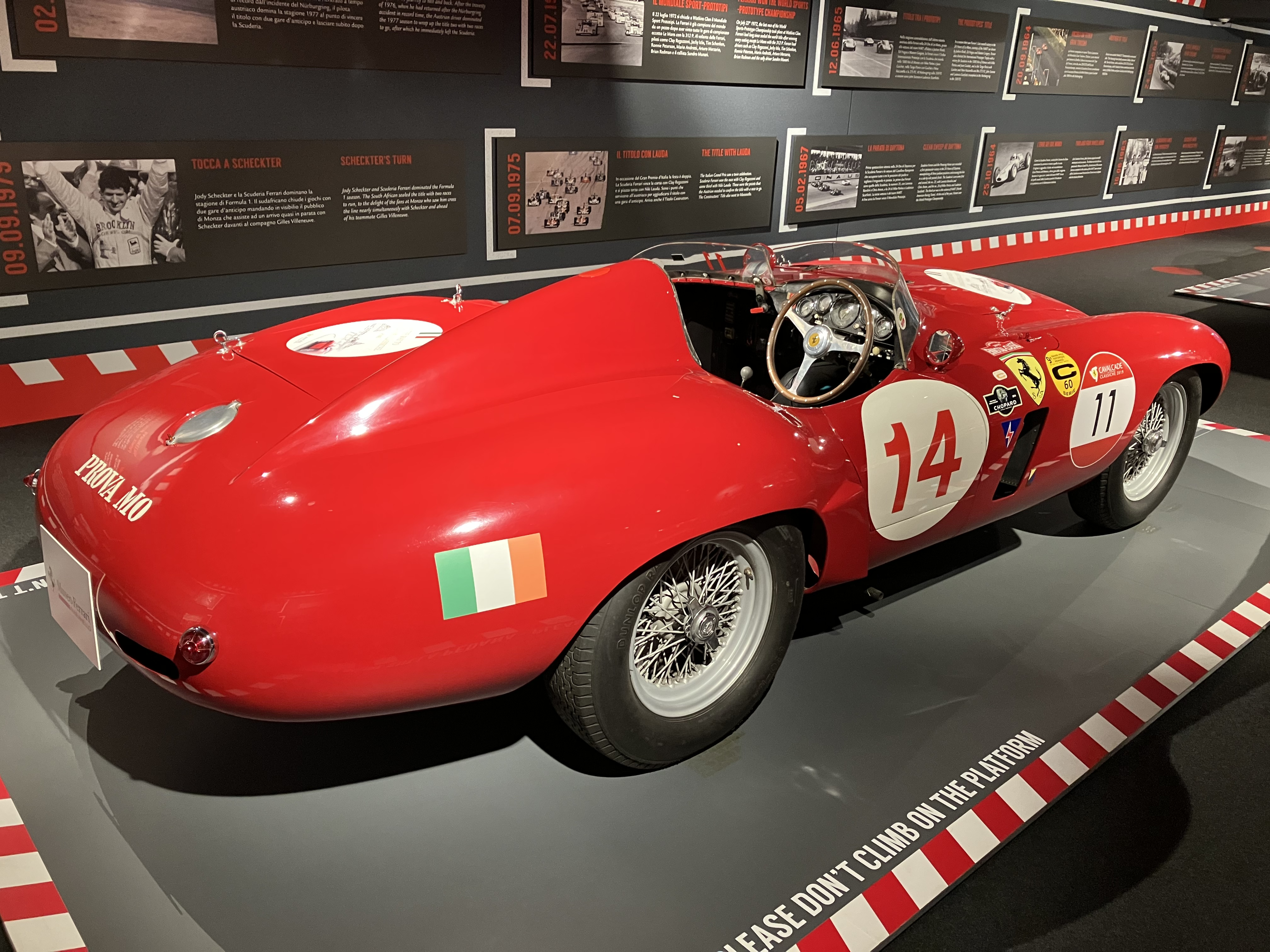

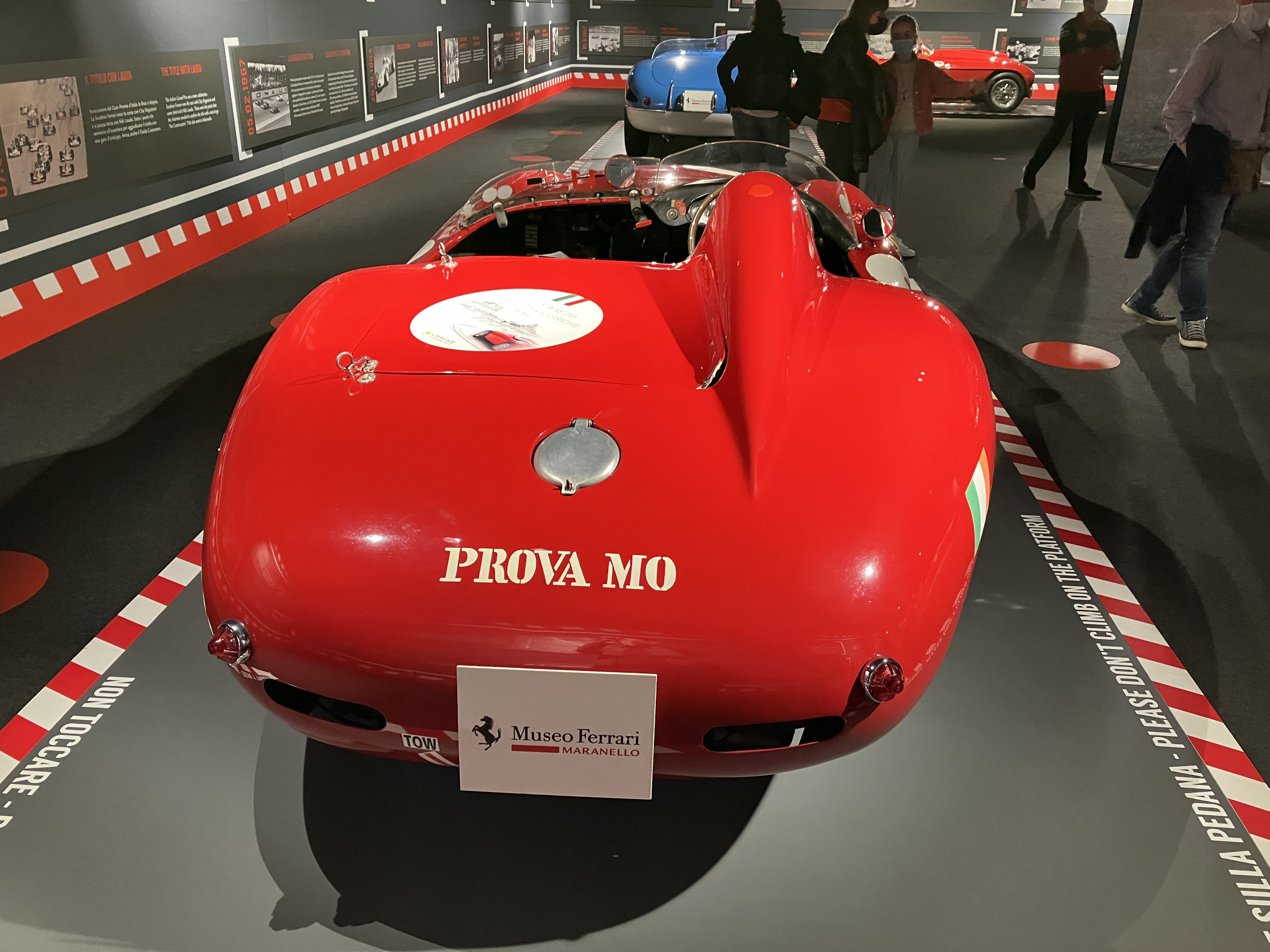

=== 857 S ===
Ferrari 857 S
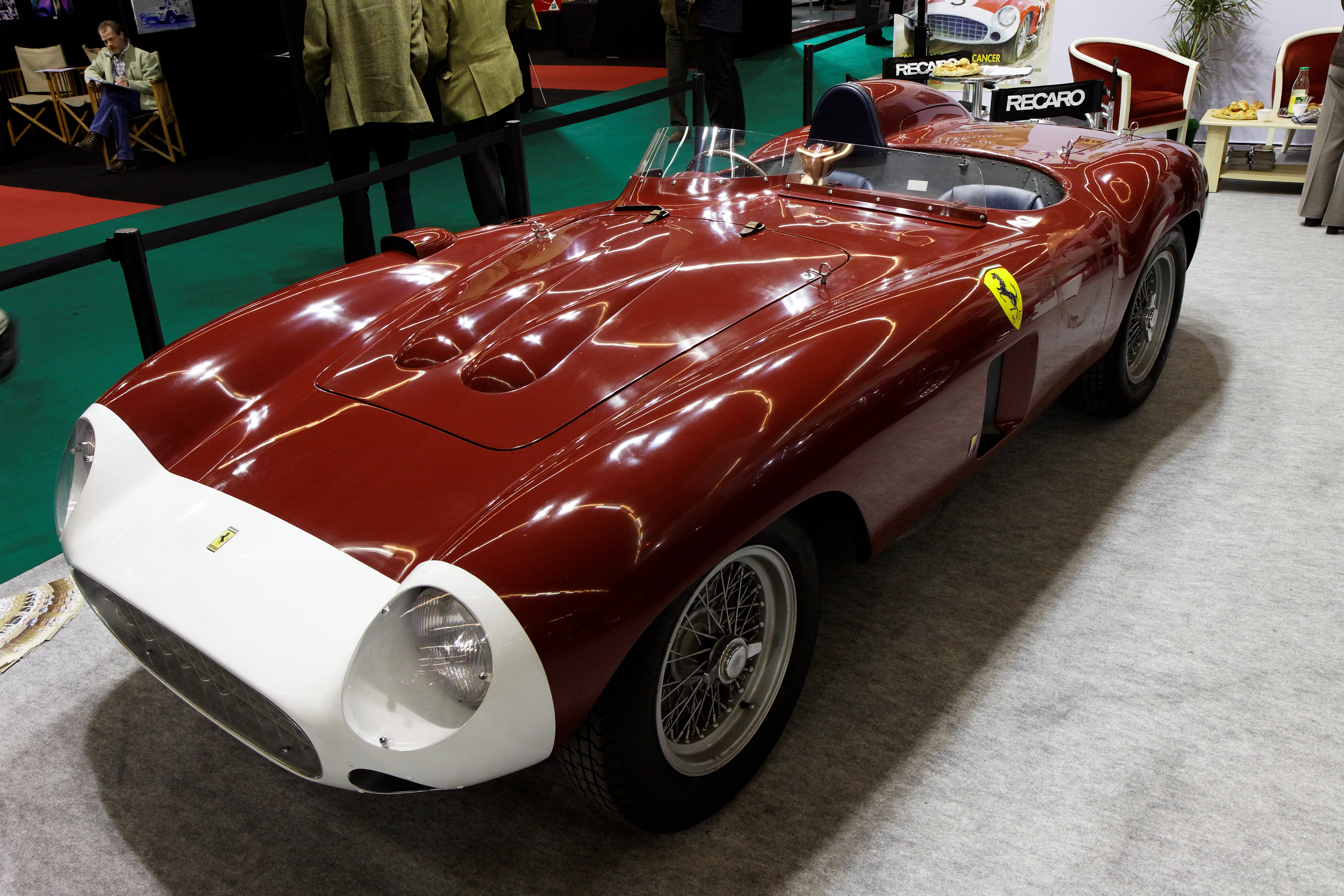

Overview
- Production: 1955

Body and chassis
- Class: WSC racer

Powertrain
- Engine: 3.4 L (3431.93 cc) Lampredi I4

Chronology
- Predecessor: Ferrari 750 Monza
- Successor: Ferrari 860 Monza

The short-lived 857 S of 1955 was an attempt to hold off the strong Mercedes-Benz team, something the 750 Monza and the 376 S/735 LM had been unable to do. An existing 750 Monza chassis received an enlarged version of Lampredi's four, now displacing 3.4 litres (3,431.93 cc; 209.4 cu in) and producing 280 hp (206 kW). The car was not competitive with the German team at the 1955 Tourist Trophy, so Lampredi went back to the drawing board for the next season. At the 1955 Targa Florio, the 857 S came third overall, driven by Castellotti. A year later, at the 1956 1000 km Buenos Aires, Olivier Gendebien and Phil Hill scored second place.

== 1956 ==
With Mercedes-Benz pulling out of international sports car racing, the 860 Monza and new 290 MM showed well throughout 1956, bringing the sports car world championship home to Modena again. This despite the fact that Jaguar's new D-Type took the crown at the newly restricted Le Mans and Maserati's 300 S took the 1000km Nürburgring race.

=== 500 TR ===
Ferrari 500 TR
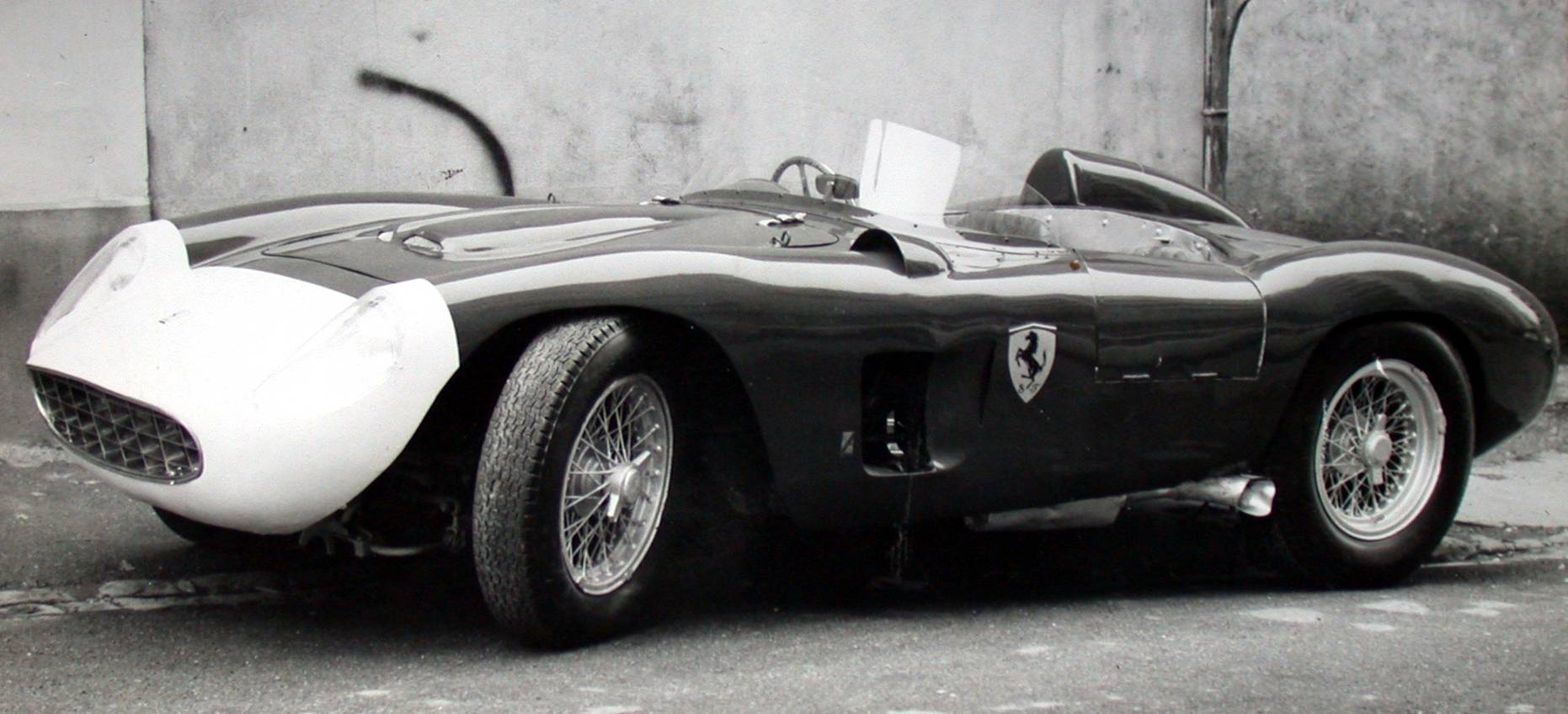

Overview
- Production: 1956; 16 produced

Body and chassis
- Class: WSC racer

Powertrain
- Engine: 2.0 L (1984.86 cc) Lampredi I4

Dimensions
- Curb weight: 680 kg (1,500 lb)

Chronology
- Predecessor: Ferrari 500 Mondial
- Successor: Ferrari 860 Monza

As the 750 was introduced in 1954, the smaller 500 Mondial was replaced by another two-liter car, the 500 TR. The first car to bear the famed Testa Rossa name, the 500 TR differed from the Mondial in many details. Among the most important was a coil spring suspension, a radical departure for Ferrari, as well as a synchronized transmission with a two-disc clutch. The 500 TR continued its predecessor's tradition of light weight, coming in at just 680 kg (1,500 lb), and this combined with the engine's 180 hp (132 kW) to bring stirring performance to the car. Scaglietti bodied all of the 500 TRs.

=== 860 Monza ===
Ferrari 860 Monza
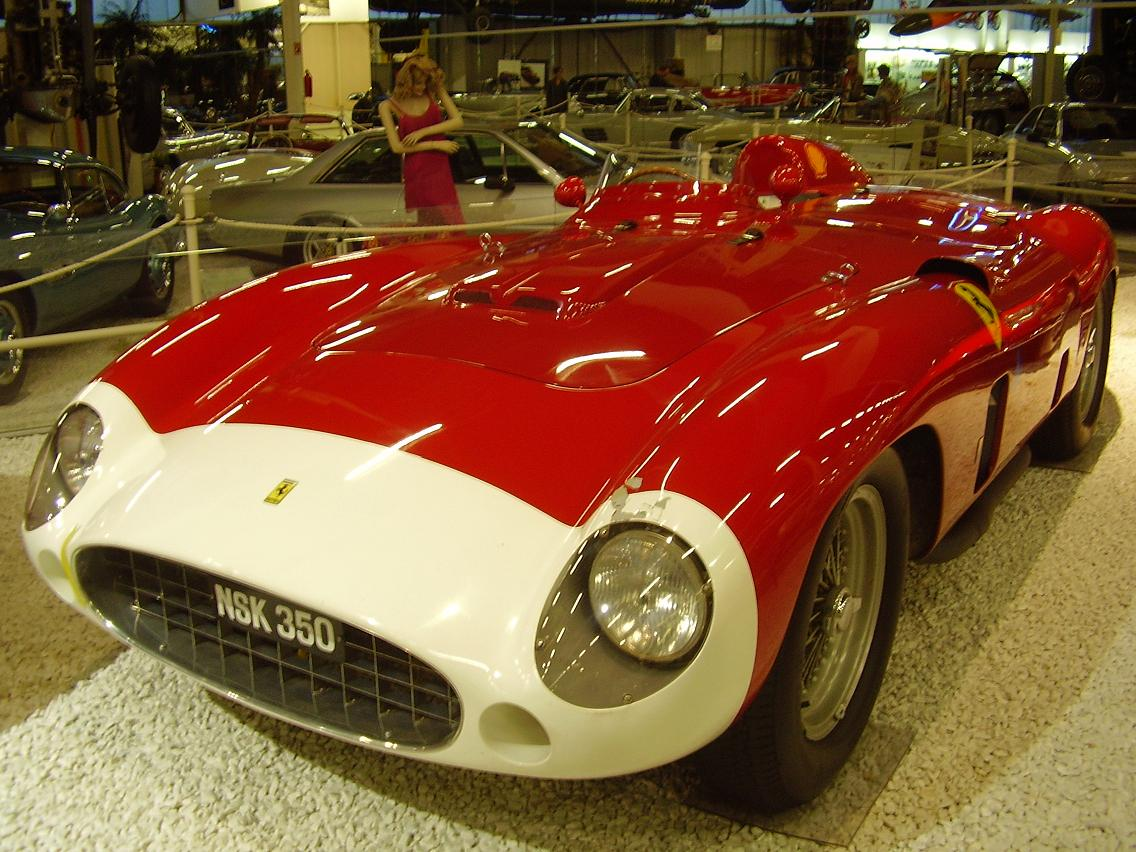

Overview
- Production: 1956; 3 produced

Body and chassis
- Class: WSC racer

Powertrain
- Engine: 3.4 L (3431.93 cc) Lampredi I4

Dimensions
- Wheelbase: 2,350 mm (92.5 in)

Chronology
- Predecessor: Ferrari 857 S
- Successor: Ferrari 290 MM

Although little changed on paper from the 857 S, the 1956 860 Monza was much more competitive in international sports car racing. The engine was reworked with 102 mm (4 in) by 105 mm (4.1 in) dimensions for a total of 3.4 L (3431.93 cc/209 in^{3}), though power output remained at 280 PS (206 kW). The wheelbase was lengthened by 100 mm (3.9 in) to 2,350 mm (93 in), but a new front coil spring suspension, as on the 500 TR, allowed the 100 kg (220 lb) heavier car to handle well. In 1956 12 Hours of Sebring Fangio and Castellotti team won the race with Musso and Schell scoring 2nd place. Also in 1956, during Mille Miglia two 860 Monzas placed second and third overall.

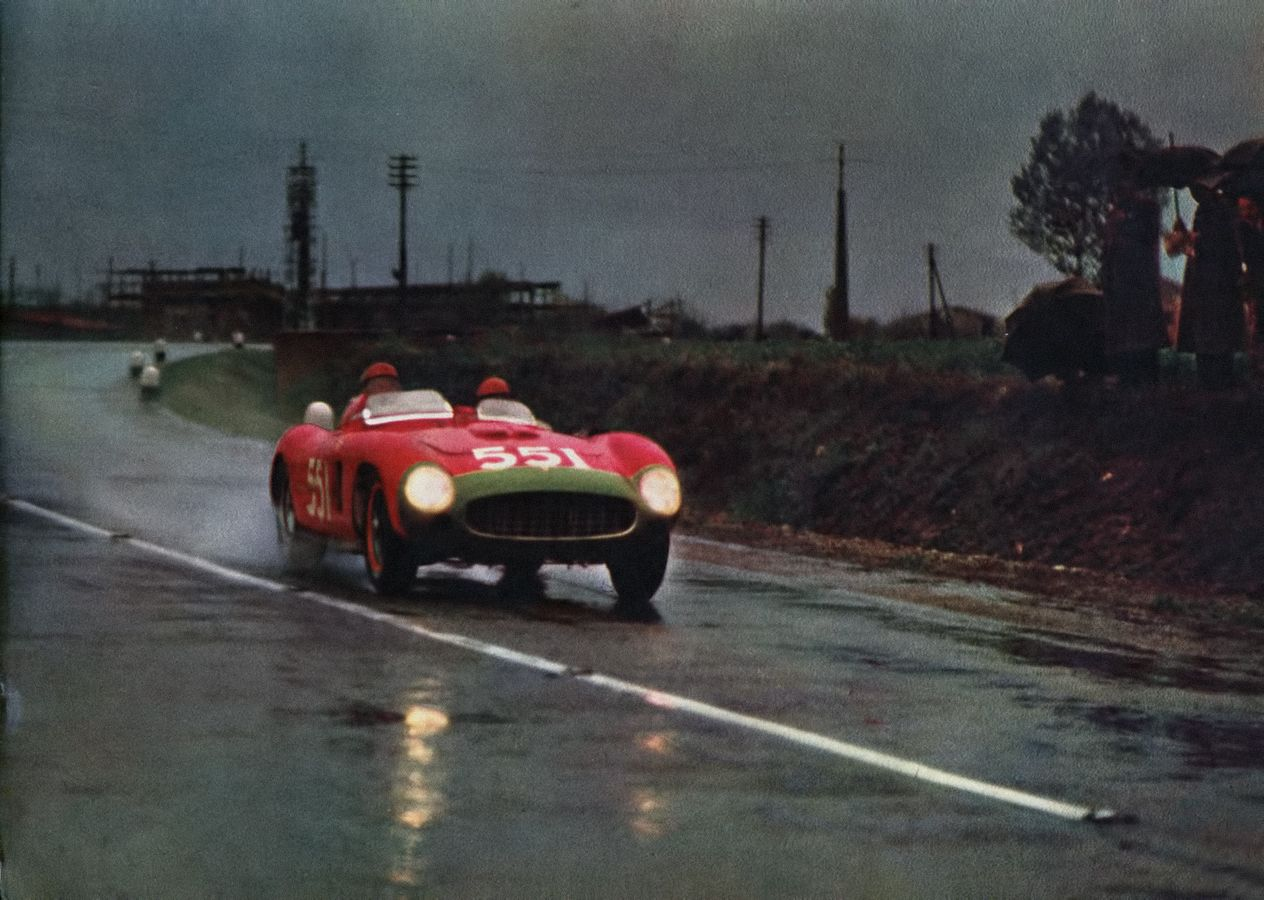
An improved Ferrari 860 Monza, driven by Peter Collins and Louis Klemantaski to 2nd place overall at 1956 Mille Miglia

=== 625 LM ===
Ferrari 625 LM
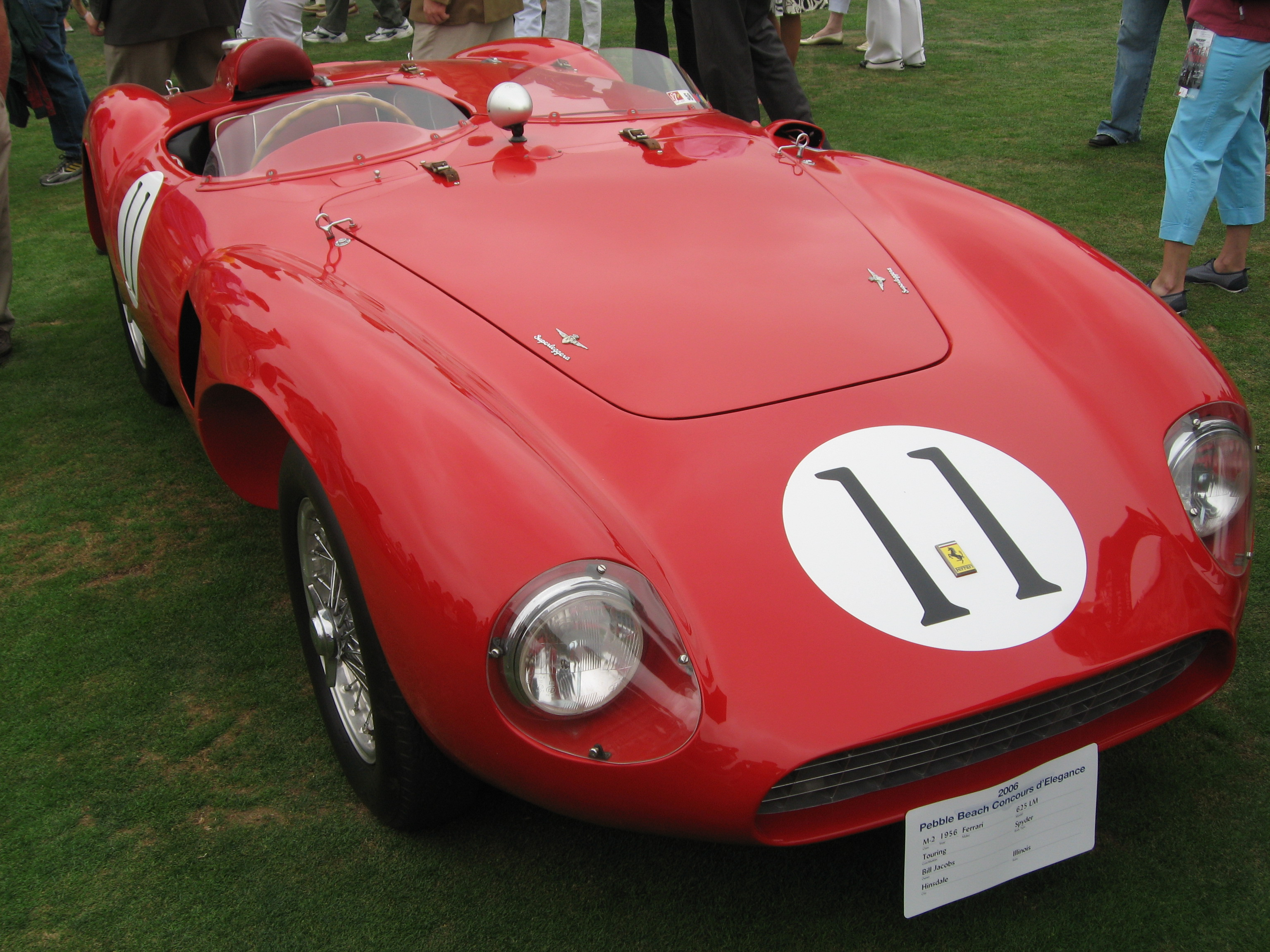

Overview
- Production: 1956; 4 produced

Body and chassis
- Class: Le Mans prototype

Powertrain
- Engine: 2.5 L (2498.32 cc) Lampredi I4

Chronology
- Predecessor: Ferrari 735 LM
- Successor: Ferrari 335 S Ferrari 250 Testa Rossa

After the 1955 Le Mans disaster, the ACO reduced engine size and restricted prototype entries for the 1956 24 Hours of Le Mans to control the speed and danger of the race. Ferrari could not enter its 1956 3.4 L 860 Monza and 3.5 L 290 MM in race, so it instead modified three 500 TR barchettas to take the larger 2.5 L engine, and entered them as the 625 LM. The engine was only slightly modified from the 625 F1 with compression reduced to 9:1 and two Weber 42DCO/A carburettors used. Of the three, only the car of Gendebien/Trintignant finished, placing third to the privately entered Ecurie Ecosse Jaguar D-Type and a factory entered Aston Martin DB3S (both these models had been produced and sold in sufficient numbers to be classed as 'production' sports cars and therefore not subject to the 2.5 litre restriction on 'prototypes'). Out of fours cars, three were bodied by Carrozzeria Touring, and the design aped the 750 Monza including the faired-in headrest.

== 1957 ==
Ferrari handed off the four-cylinder sports racer line to customers at the end of 1956, choosing to equip Scuderia Ferrari with the Jano V12-powered 315 S and 335 S cars as well as the Colombo V12-powered 250 Testa Rossa.

=== 500 TRC ===
Ferrari 500 TRC
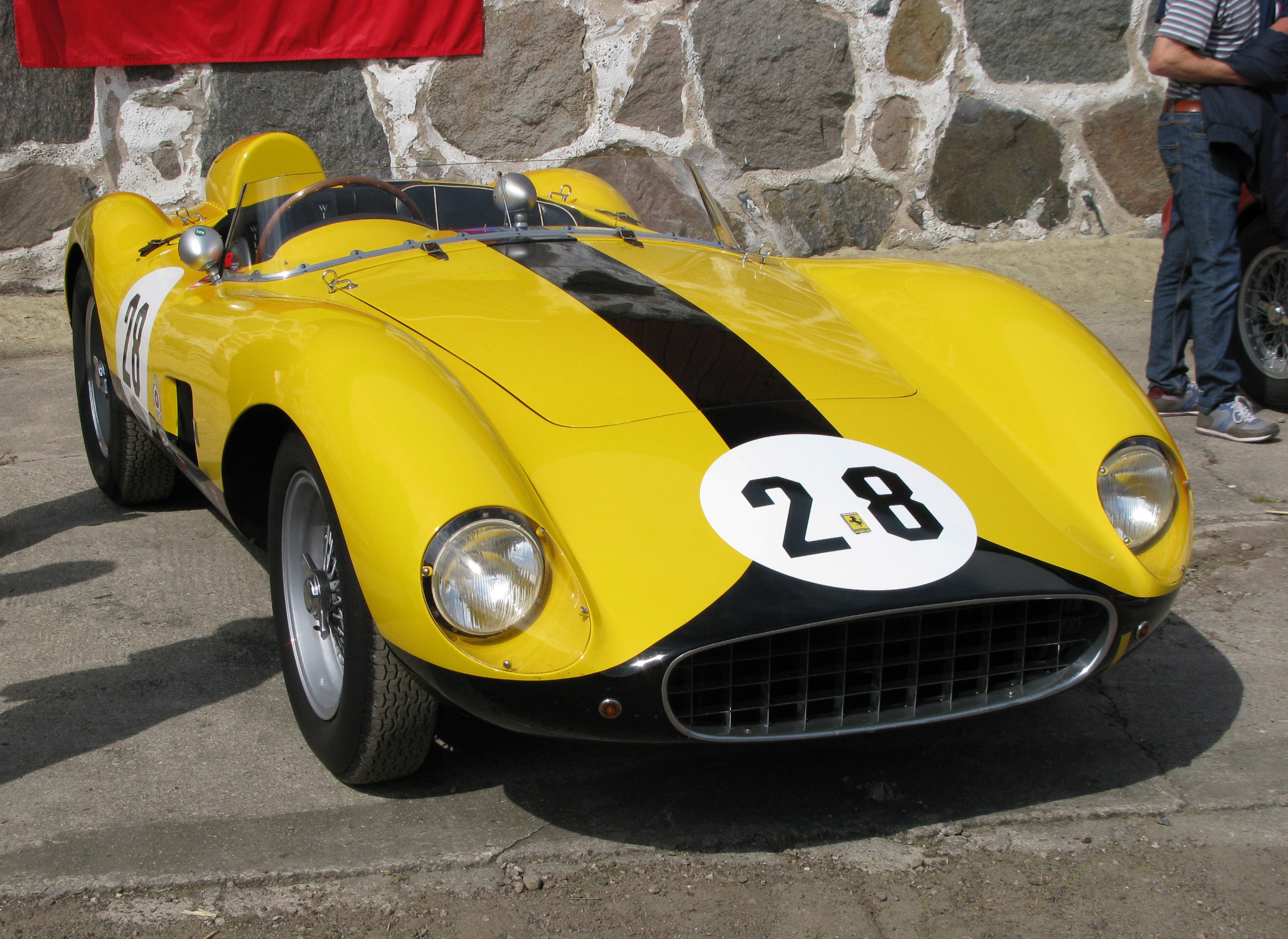

Overview
- Production: 1957; 19 produced

Body and chassis
- Class: WSC racer

Powertrain
- Engine: 2.0 L (1984.86 cc) Lampredi I4

Dimensions
- Curb weight: 680 kg (1,500 lb)

Chronology
- Predecessor: Ferrari 500 TR

The 1956/7 500 TRC was an altered version of the successful 500 TR of the previous year. The most significant changes were made to comply with Annex C of the International Racing Code, resulting in the "C" added to the model's name. In order to follow these regulations, Ferrari widened the cockpit, added a passenger side door, fitted a full-width windscreen with wipers, installed a 120 liters (32 U.S. gal) fuel tank and even added a stowable convertible top. The Scaglietti-built body, while similar to that of the 500 TR, had a lower hood and slightly reshaped wheel arches and fenders. Another change from the 500 TR was the longer 2,350 mm (93 in) wheelbase, derived from the 860 Monza. Suspension featured coil springs all around with a live rear axle. Like the 500 TR, the car weighed only 680 kg (1,500 lb), and produced 180 hp (132 kW). Ferrari manufactured a total of 19 500 TRC chassis between 1956 and 1957. This model was the last 4-cylinder racing car built by Ferrari.

Even though this model was never raced by Scuderia Ferrari as a works car, 500 TRCs were successfully raced by independent teams and drivers. At the 1957 24 Hours of Le Mans, a 500 TRC finished 7th overall, claiming victory in the 2,000 cc class, . Another 500 TRC claimed a 2,000 cc class win at the 1958 Targa Florio.

Two 500 TRC chassis were upgraded by factory to 2.5-litre specification, creating the very rare 625 TRC model. They were both owned and raced by John von Neumann, owner of the Ferrari Representatives of California dealership. S/n 0672MDTR was further fitted with the 3.4 L 860 Monza engine, just to be refitted once more in 1958, this time with a 3.0 L 250 Testa Rossa unit. S/n 0680MDTR was sold on May 12, 2012, at RM Sotheby's auction in Monaco for €5 million.

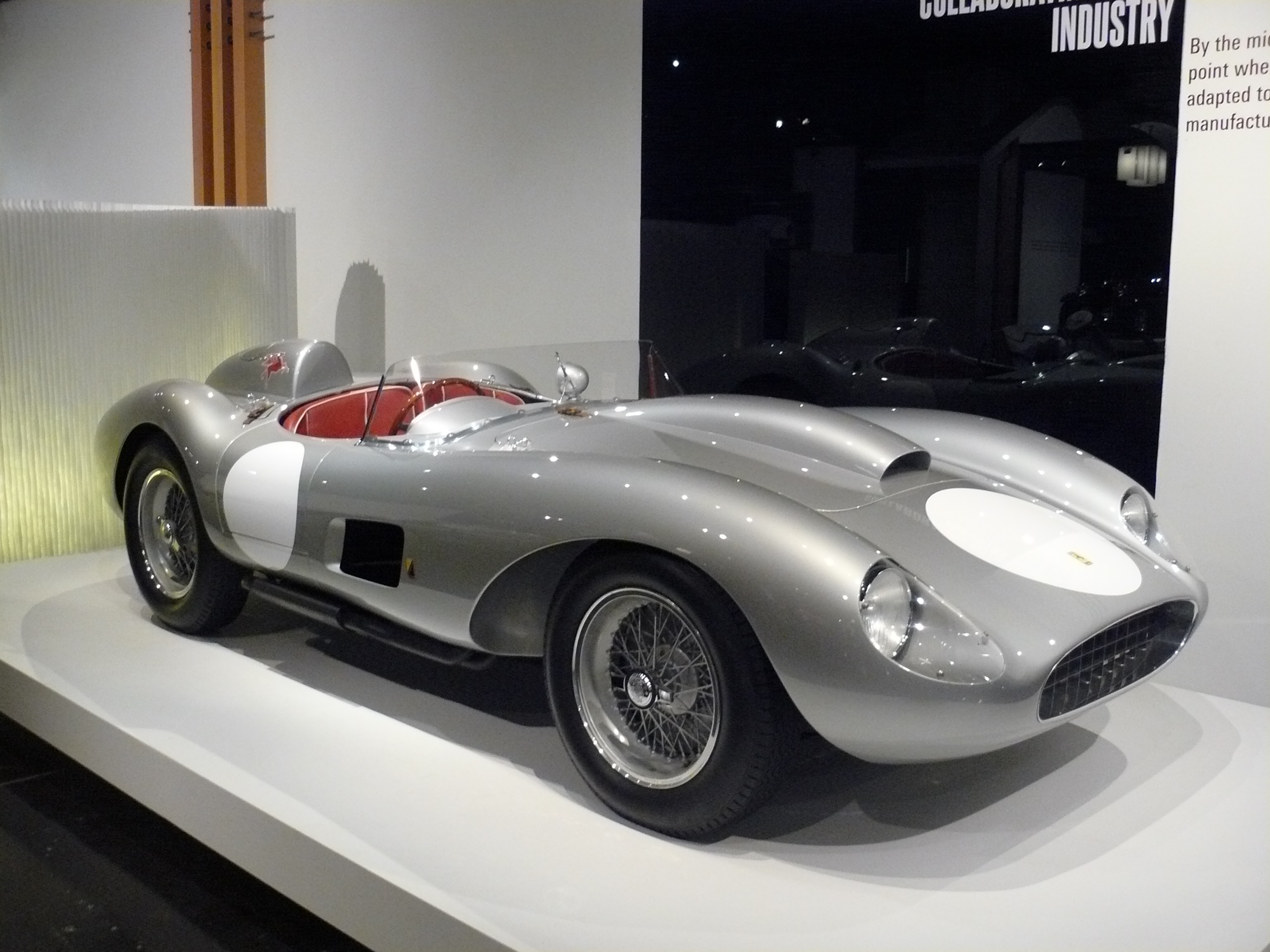
Ferrari 625/250 TRC

== Monza SP1/SP2 ==
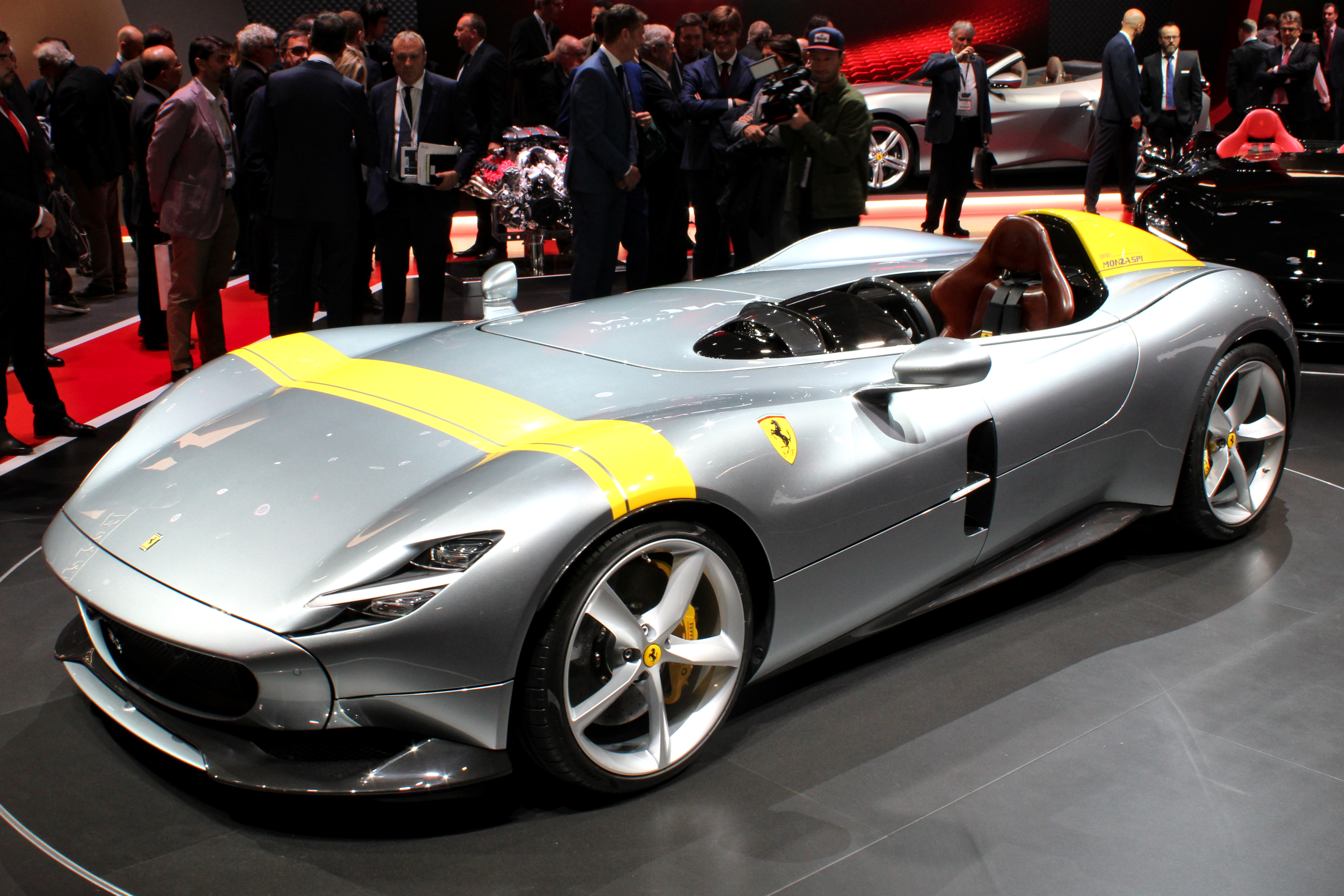
Ferrari Monza SP1 at 2018 Paris Motor Show

The Monza SP1 and SP2 are limited production sports cars inspired by the previous Monza models, such as 750 Monza and 860 Monza. It was introduced in 2018. The cars mark the start of a new lineage of models called the "Icona" series, a program aimed at creating special cars inspired by classic Ferrari models, all to be produced in limited series. The SP1 is a single seater, while the SP2 features two seats. Fewer than 500 are expected to be produced.

== See also ==
- Ferrari 250 Monza A "hybrid" sports racing car of extended 500 Mondial chassis and 3.0-litre Colombo V12 engine.
