= Ferrari 250 Monza =

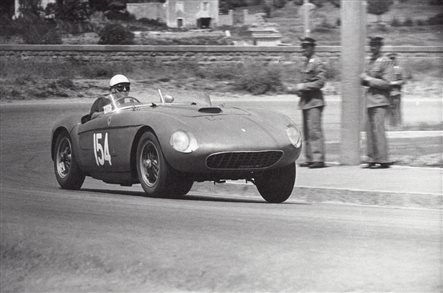
- Ferrari 250 Monza Pinin Farina Spyder

Overview
- Manufacturer: Ferrari
- Also called: Ferrari Super Monza
- Production: 1954; 4 produced
- Designer: Pinin Farina; Scaglietti

Body and chassis
- Body style: Spyder
- Layout: Front mid-engine, rear-wheel-drive

Powertrain
- Engine: 3.0 L (2953.21 cc) Tipo 107 Colombo V12
- Power output: 240 PS
- Transmission: 4-speed manual

Dimensions
- Wheelbase: 2,400 mm (94.5 in)
- Curb weight: 850 kg (1,874 lb)

Chronology
- Predecessor: Ferrari 250 MM
- Successor: Ferrari 857 S; Ferrari 250 Testa Rossa

The Ferrari 250 Monza was a sports racing car produced by Ferrari in 1954. It was a combination of a stretched chassis and body from the line of inline-four-engined racers with a ubiquitous 3.0-litre Colombo V12 engine.

== Development ==
After ongoing success of inline-four engines in Formula One, Ferrari also employed those powerplants for their sports racing cars. Enzo Ferrari was unhappy with replacing the smaller capacity V12 race cars with inline-engined racers and wanted to ensure the use of his beloved engine. The inline-four engines produced a better low-end torque and the V12's were superior in higher revs and peak power output.

The 250 Monza was powered by the three-litre version of the Colombo V12 engine of the similar specification as used in the 250 MM, developed a year earlier. It was then mounted in the tried and capable, elongated version of the 500 Mondial chassis. A total of only four of these "hybrid" sports racing cars were created. Three of them were bodied in aluminium by Pinin Farina with a design based to that fitted on the roadster body of the 500 Mondial with necessary modifications due to a different powerplant. The bonnet of the car received an air-scoop for centre mounted carburettors. The single remaining chassis received a Scaglietti two-seater spyder body in the style of the 750 Monza to an Alfredo Ferrari design.

One car was retained by the Scuderia Ferrari works team, while the remaining three were sold to an Italian customer Franco Cornacchia of Scuderia Guastalla. The first 250 Monza was created in May of 1954, as a prototype of the series. S/n 0432M received a Pinin Farina Spyder bodywork and an engine of a different type than the rest, the Tipo 117. It was originally sold new to Cornacchia before he sold it on to Luigi Piotti for 3.5 million Lire. The car was then acquired by Luigi Chinetti, who send it to Scaglietti before shipping it to the United States. A new 'pontoon fender' spyder body was created around 1957, and it is believed to be a precursor to the production 250 Testa Rossa body from 1958. The car was finished in white with a blue stripe and briefly raced in North America. When offered for sale in 1961 it was referred to as a "Ferrari Super Monza".

The 250 Monza, s/n 0420M was the only works car used by Scuderia Ferrari. After a victorious debut race it was presented at the Amsterdam motor show, where it was sold to Hans Maasland of Netherlands. When the car was damaged at the second heat race at Zandvoort, it was sent back to the factory where it received a new body made by Pinin Farina in their same style. By 1955 the car was passed on to Hans Tak.

The s/n 0442M was the third Monza built and the only originally bodied by Scaglietti. It was sold new to Franco Cornacchia who drove it with Gerino Gerini. After the 1954 Carrera Panamericana the car was sold to Mercedes-Benz dealer Manfredo Lippmann from Guatemala, who tried to enter the car for the 1955 12 Hours of Sebring, but damaged the car before the race. In 2002, the Ferrari 250 Monza Scaglietti Spyder, s/n 0442M was sold on RM auction for US$ 1.7 million.

The last chassis, s/n 0466M was also bodied by Pinin Farina and sold new to Cornacchia. At some point it was offered for sale, in an unrestored state, for €5 million.

Although intended as a replacement for the 250 MM in an open variant and an alternative to the 3.0-litre 750 Monza, the lack of immediate success forced Ferrari to focus on its inline-four family of open top racers and the upcoming straight-six models.

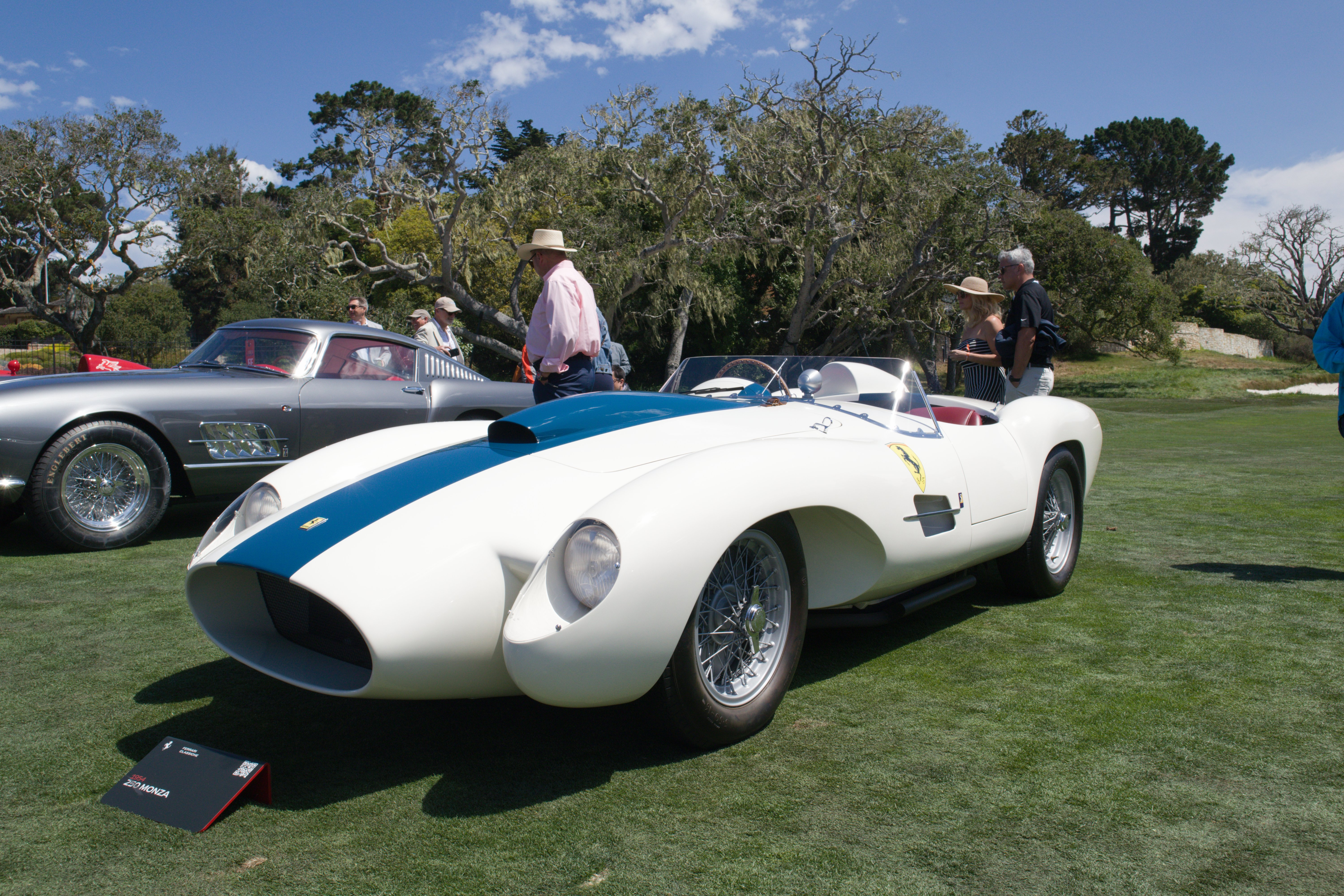
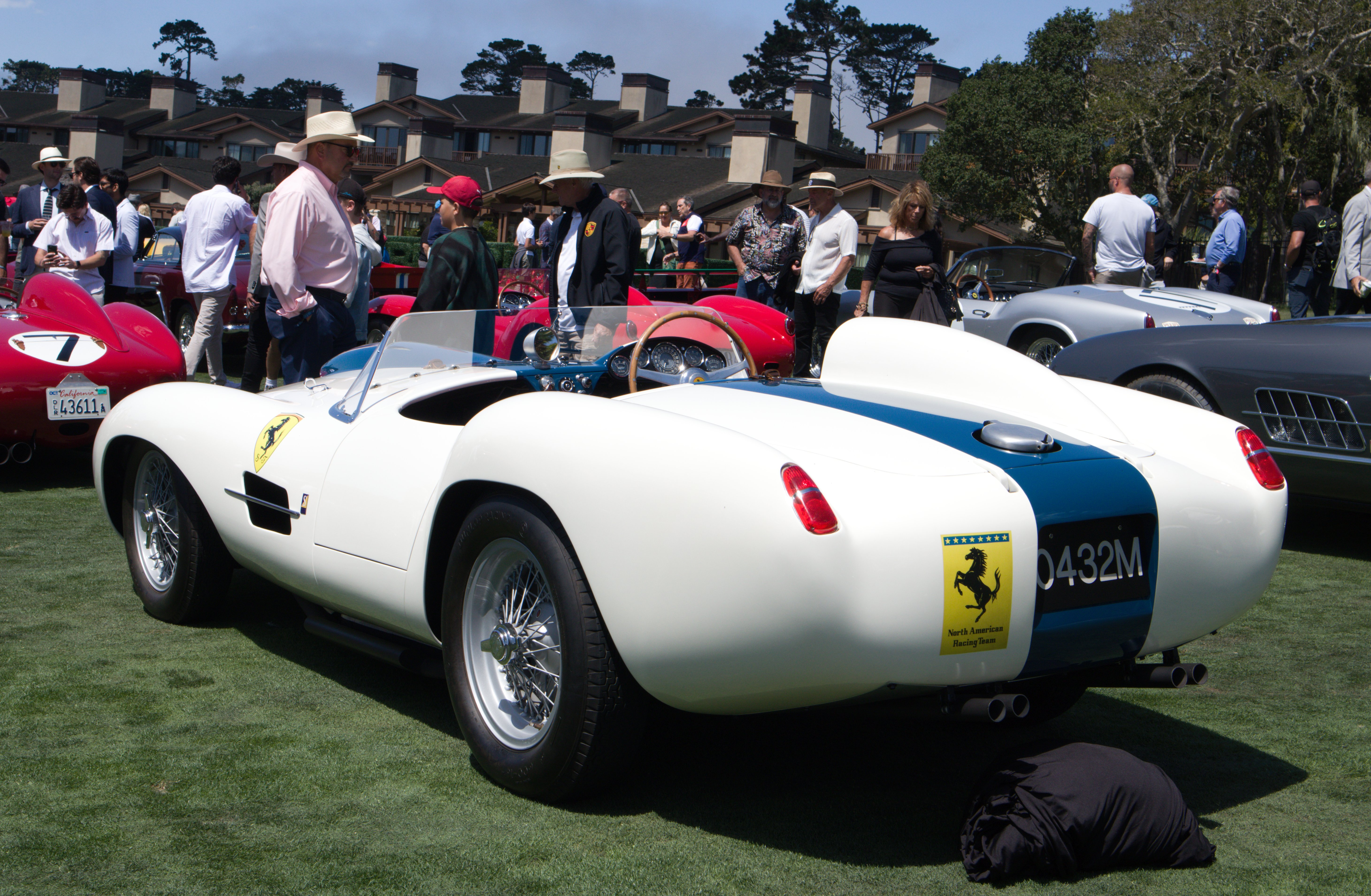
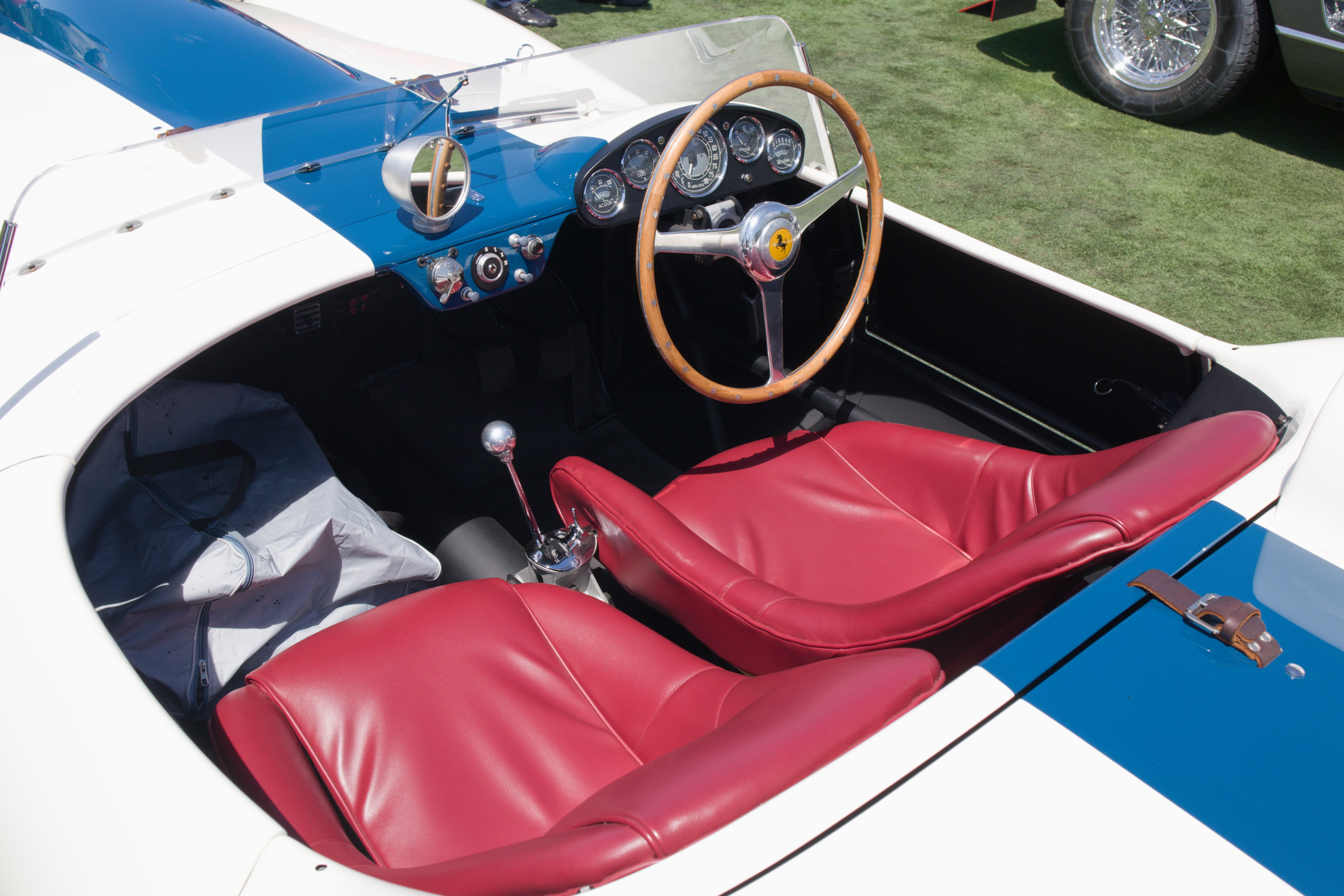
250 Monza rebodied by Scaglietti as 'pontoon fender' spyder

== Specifications ==
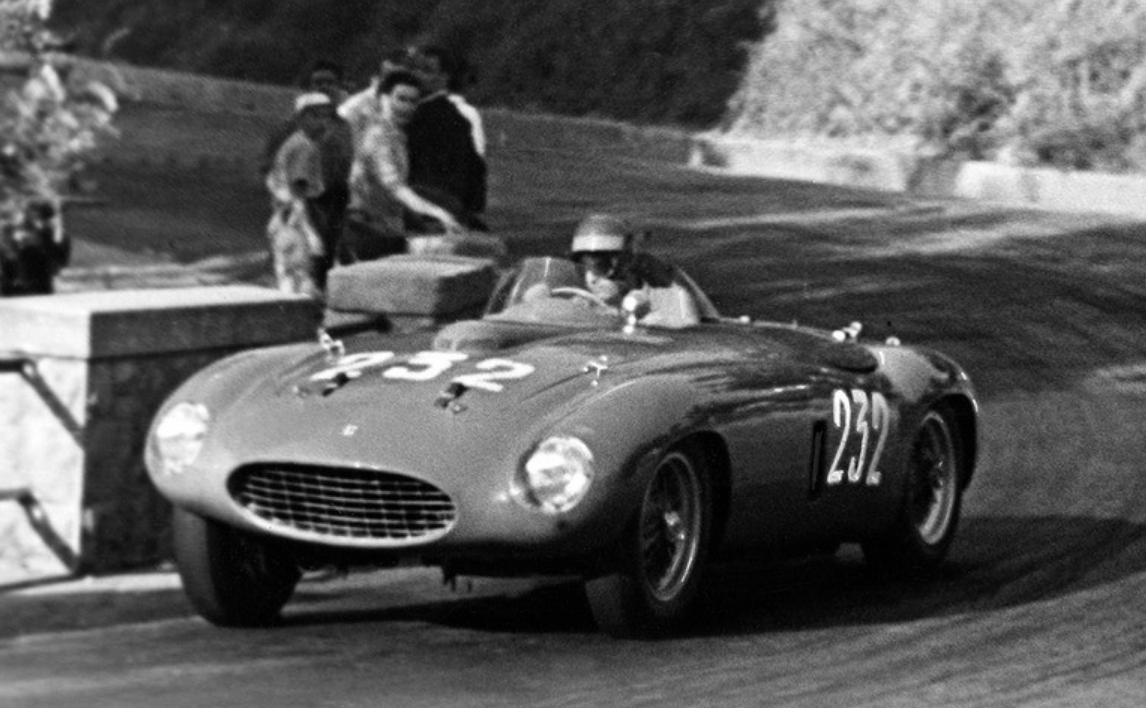
250 Monza Scaglietti Spyder driven by Franco Cornacchia and Gerino Gerini to a third place during GP Supercortemaggiore at Monza

=== Engine and transmission ===
The Ferrari 250 Monza was powered by a SOHC Colombo 60° V12 engine with total displacement of 2,953.21 cc (3.0 L; 180.2 cu in). The engine was designated Tipo 107, while the prototype car was powered by a Tipo 117 engine. The fuel was fed by three quad-choke Weber 36IF/4C carburettors with the resulting maximum power output of 240 PS (177 kW; 237 hp) at 7200 rpm with 9:1 compression ratio. Ignition was by a single spark plug per cylinder, served by two magnetos. The engine was lubricated with a wet sump oil system. A transmission, mounted at the rear for better weight balance, had four gears.

=== Chassis ===
The Tipo 504 tubular steel chassis was derived from the 500 Mondial chassis, modified to accept the larger V12 engine in place of the 500 Mondial's inline-four. The wheelbase was extended by 150 mm (5.9 in) to 2,400 mm (94.5 in). The fuel tank had a capacity of 125 litres.

=== Suspension ===
The front suspension was independent with unequal-length double wishbones, transverse leaf spring and Houdaille hydraulic shock absorbers. At the rear the ubiquitous De Dion axle with rear mounted gearbox were installed along with, twin radius arms, semi-elliptic springs and Houdaille hydraulic shock absorbers. The brakes were hydraulic drums all-round.

== Racing ==
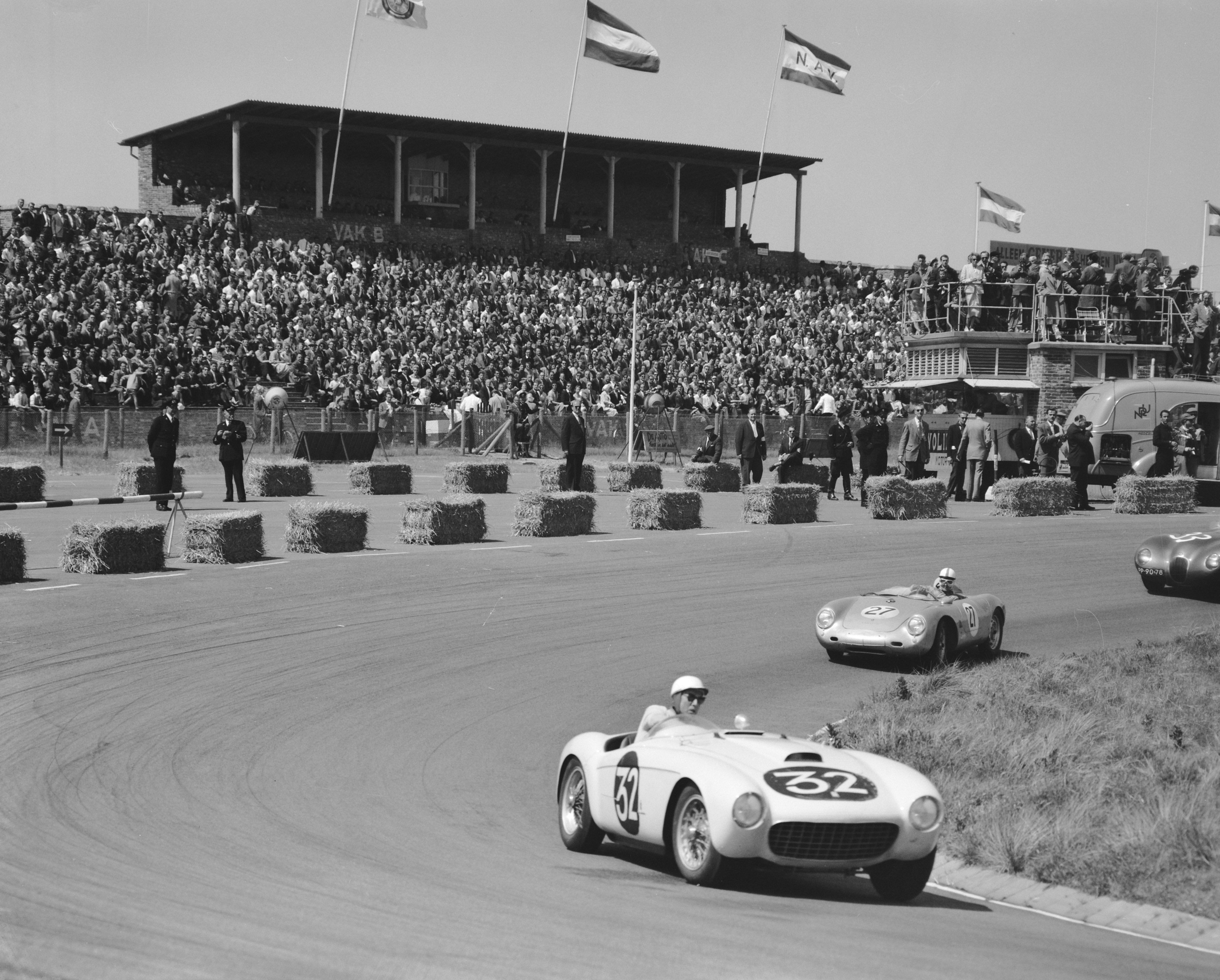
250 Monza Pinin Farina Spyder at Zandvoort

The Ferrari 250 Monza debuted at the 12 Hours of Hyères endurance race of 1954 and was driven by Maurice Trintignant and Luigi Piotti. They drove the Pinin Farina bodied car entered by Scuderia Ferrari, s/n 0420M, and won the race against smaller-engined 500 Mondial of Picard and Pozzi. It remained the only entry of the 250 Monza as a works car. Scuderia Guastella entered two of theirs cars for the 1954 Supercortemaggiore. Pinin Farina Spyder, driven by Piotti/Robert Manzon duo finished on 11th place, while the Scaglietti Spyder with Franco Cornacchia and Gerino Gerini placed on the third podium step. The first two places went to 3.0-litre Ferrari inline-four racers. Gerini then embarked solo on a series of races, winning Trofeo Sardo and scoring a second place overall at Bolzano-Mendola hillclimb.

Three 250 Monzas were fielded in July for Coppa d'Oro delle Dolomiti. Gerini in his Scaglietti Spyder were third overall and first in S+2.0 class. Franco Cornacchia entered his brand new Pinin Farina Syder, the last chassis made, and finished on a 15th place. Luigi Piotti who recently bought the car from Scuderia Guastalla did not finish the race. For the 10 Hours of Messina race two cars were entered but non had crossed the finish line. This time for the night driving, Piotti employed Umberto Maglioli as a second driver. At the Circuito di Senigallia, later the same year, for the S+2.0 class, Gerino Gerini scored a second place representing Scuderia Guastalla. The first place went to 750 Monza of Scuderia Ferrari. Circuito di Reggio Calabria race of 1954 was won by privateer Luigi Piotti.

The Scuderia Ferrari car was sold to a Hans Maasland who entered it into International Sports Car race at Zandvoort. Car was driven by Joke Maasland who finished the first heat of the race at a second place in class, but had an accident in the second heat. The Scaglietti Spyder of Scuderia Guastalla was entered in the last edition of the gruelling 1954 Carrera Panamericana. Franco Cornacchia was aided by Enrico Peruchini and both had raced to a fifth overall and third in class. The best result for a 250 Monza at the 1955 Mille Miglia was a 15th overall and a sixth in class by Erasmo "Kammamuri" Simeoni. He would also finish Trieste-Opicina hillclimb on a fourth place.

The damaged car from Zandvoort was repaired by the factory and sold to Hans Tak, also from Netherlands, who campaigned the car from 1955 though 1959. He won its class at 1955 International Sports Car race at Zandvoort, 1956 Nationale Sportwagen race at Pinksterrace and 1959 National Sports Car race, also at Zandvoort.
