= Ferrari 250 S =

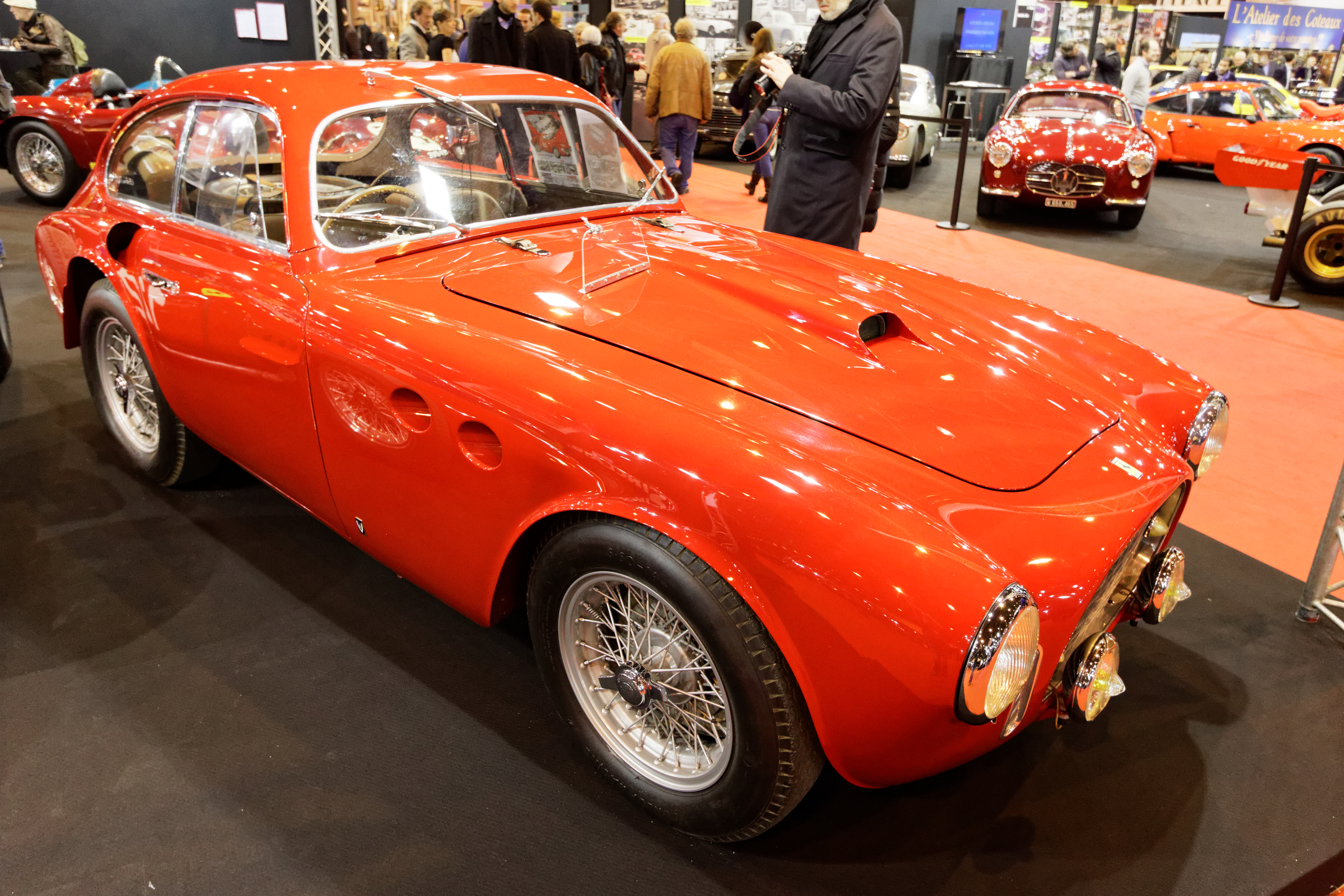

Overview
- Manufacturer: Ferrari
- Also called: Ferrari 250 Sport
- Production: 1952; 1 produced
- Designer: Giovanni Michelotti at Vignale

Body and chassis
- Body style: Berlinetta
- Layout: Front mid-engine, rear-wheel-drive
- Related: Ferrari 225 S

Powertrain
- Engine: 3.0 L (2953.21 cc) Colombo V12
- Power output: 230 PS
- Transmission: 5-speed manual

Dimensions
- Wheelbase: 2,250 mm (88.6 in)
- Length: 3,800 mm (149.6 in)
- Width: 1,570 mm (61.8 in)
- Height: 1,400 mm (55.1 in)
- Curb weight: 850 kg (1,874 lb) (dry)

Chronology
- Predecessor: Ferrari 225 S
- Successor: Ferrari 250 MM

The Ferrari 250 S was a sports racing car produced by Ferrari in 1952. It was the first in the long lineage of Ferrari 250 road and race cars powered by a ubiquitous 3.0-litre Colombo V12 engine. In 1952 the 250 S won the Mille Miglia and 12 Hours of Pescara. At the Le Mans, the same year, it clocked the fastest race lap time. Only a single example was produced.

== Development ==
The 250 S was created as an evolution over the preceding 225 S model. It shared the same tubular steel chassis of a Tuboscocca type as some of them. The new model retained the same wheelbase and track dimensions. New was the 3.0-litre Colombo V12 engine, developed by Aurelio Lampredi as a chief Ferrari engineer at that time.

The 250 S had a closed berlinetta bodywork designed by Giovanni Michelotti and carried out by Vignale. The style closely resembled the Vignale berlinettas of its predecessors. Front fenders had two portholes in them and the fuel filler cap was on the outside, mounted on the rear window. After the Mile Miglia, bonnet was modified with an air-scoop. Front windshield had three small wipers installed, one of them was on the roof.

A single example was ever produced, s/n 0156ET. "ET" in its suffix represented 'Export-Tuboscocca'. The technical experience and racing capabilities of the 250 S over its career led Ferrari to develop a series produced race car, the 250 MM.

== Specifications ==
=== Engine and transmission ===
The 250 S' engine was based on the 225 S unit with a bore stretched by 3 mm (0.12 in). Now the internal measurements were at 73 by 58.8 mm (2.9 by 2.3 in) of bore and stroke. The resulting capacity was 2,953.21 cc (3.0 L; 180.2 cu in) and would make the better use out of any 'Sport 3.0' category regulations. The power output benefited from an updated and innovative design of the intake and distribution, already introduced on the 225 S, and was now at 230 PS (169 kW; 227 hp) at 7500 rpm. A compression ratio of 9:1 was higher than before. An SOHC and two valve configuration was standard for Ferrari V12 at that time. Also unchanged were the three Weber 36DCF carburettors. The engine used a single spark plug per cylinder, served by two coils and had a wet sump lubrication. The 250 S still used a five-speed non-synchronised gearbox. Clutch was of a single-plate type.

=== Chassis and suspension ===
The chassis of the 250 S was one of the Tuboscocca type that used a smaller diameter steel tubes with additional cross members. The resulting trellis space frame was slightly lighter and more rigid than the standard tubular chassis. It was developed by Gilco, a chassis specialist company established by Gilberto Colombo, and first introduced on a late 212 Export. The front suspension was independent with unequal-length wishbones and transverse leaf springs, aided by hydraulic shock absorbers. At the rear was a live axle with semi-elliptical springs and hydraulic shock absorbers. Brakes were of a drum type.

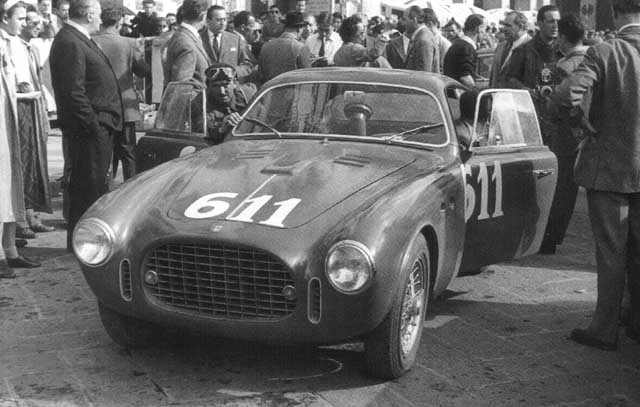
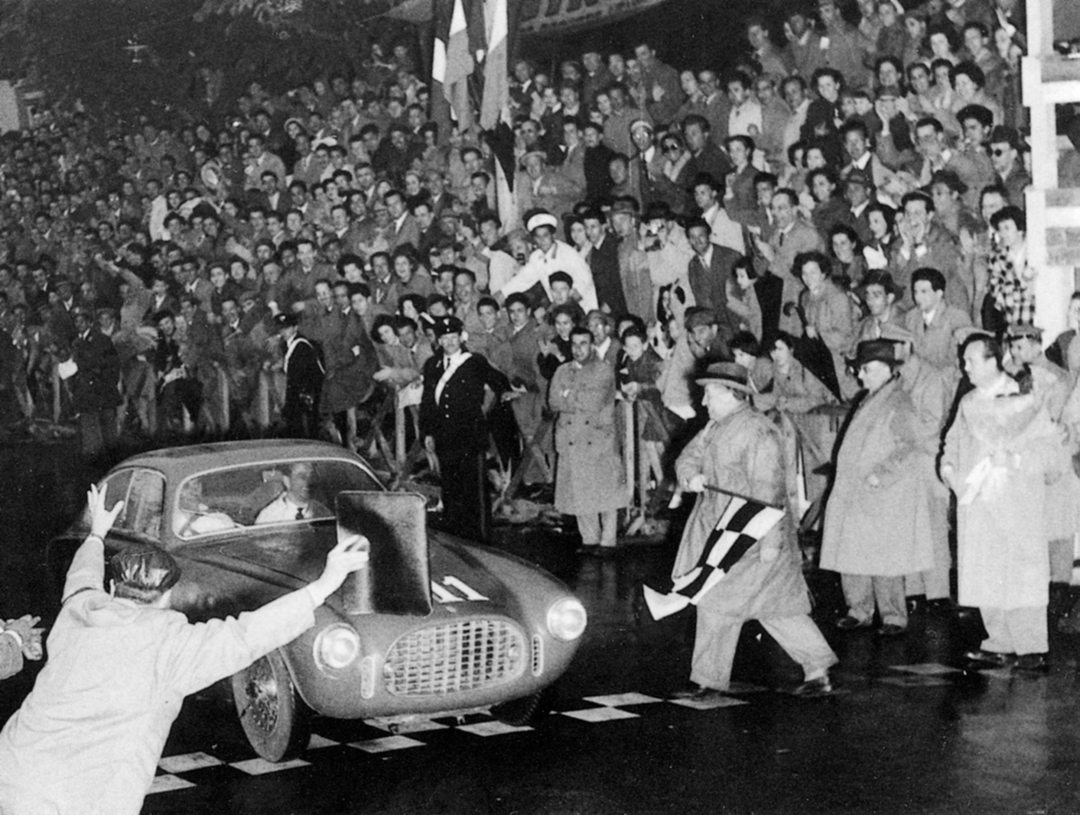
250 S winner of the 1952 Mille Miglia

== Racing ==
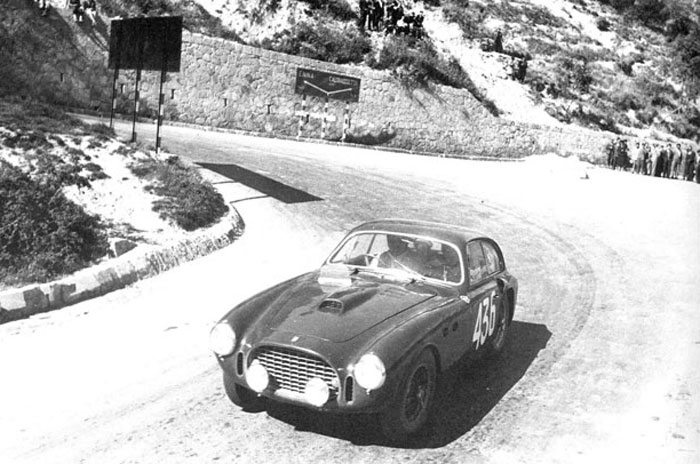
Franco Cornacchia and Gino Bronzoni during 1953 Giro di Sicilia

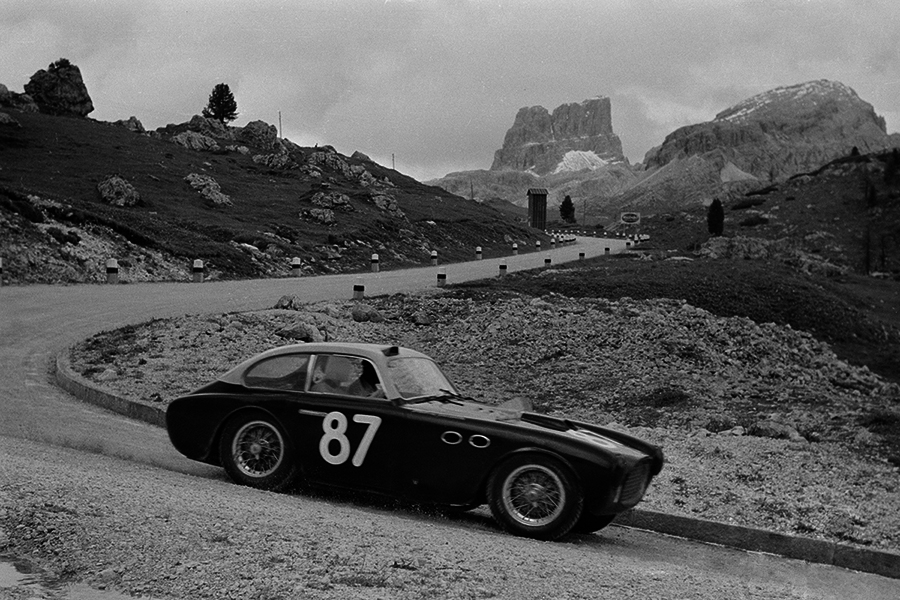
250 S during 1953 Coppa d' Oro delle Dolomiti

The 250 S had its first outing at the 1952 Mille Miglia, as did several Mercedes-Benz W194 300 SL entered by the factory that had put some effort into training runs. Entered by Scuderia Ferrari, the 205 S was driven by Giovanni Bracco and Alfonso Rolfo. After a magnificent performance on the Futa and Raticosa passes, they managed to pass the leading Mercedes of Karl Kling to finish first overall, continuing Ferrari's dominance in this road marathon.

Bracco did enter the 1952 Monaco Grand Prix which was run for sports cars in that year, but his Scuderia Guastalla Ferrari 225 S was the only one to DNF while others of that type finished 1-5.

Alberto Ascari and Luigi Villoresi were chosen by Scuderia Ferrari to compete in the 1952 24 Hours of Le Mans in the 'Sport 3.0' category. The 250 S, driven by Ascari, recorded the fastest race lap at 4min 40.5sec at an average speed of 173.16 km/h, nearly matching the fastest practice lap set by Hermann Lang, the eventual Mercedes 1-2 race winner. The Ferrari retired with a broken clutch.

At the 1952 Circuito di Senigallia race, the 250 S was entered in the 'Sport +2.0' class. Luigi Villoresi managed a third place overall. Later the same year, at the Coppa Acerbo for sports cars, renamed as the 12 Hours of Pescara, yielded another success for Ferrari. Giovanni Bracco and Paolo Marzotto won the race in the 250 S. The 1952 Carrera Panamericana race was contested by Giovanni Bracco and Gino Bronzoni duo. Their car did not finish the grueling marathon due to clutch and engine problems, while Mercedes won 1-2 again.

In 1953, at the 13° Giro di Sicilia (de:Giro di Sicilia 1953), Franco Cornacchia and Gino Bronzoni finished the race prematurely with a broken differential.

In 1953 the 250 S was acquired by an Argentinian Roberto Bonomi. Later the same year, he had entered it in the Targa Florio (de:Targa Florio 1953) race. He finished eighth overall and, sixth in 'S 3.0' class.

The car competed in the GP Monza (de:Großer Preis von Monza 1953), entered by Scuderia Guastalla, finishing at an eighth place. Later, Bonomi entered the Coppa d'Oro delle Dolomiti race but to no avail. The last race of the 250 S was the 1954 Supercortemaggiore at Monza (de:1000-km-Rennen von Monza 1954). Entered by Scuderia Guastella and driven by Musitelli and Pezzoli the car did not finish the race.

== See also ==
- Ferrari 250
