= Vittorio Colocci =

Italian racing driver

Vittorio Colocci was an Italian racing driver. He entered 15 races between 1950 and 1956, including four times the Mille Miglia, mainly driving Ferraris and Lancias. His best results include one class victory and two second places.

== Complete results ==
No.	Year	Date	Race	Car	Teammate(s)	Result
1	1950	July 2	Circuito di Collemaggio	Fiat-Patriarca		11th
2	1952	September 14	Trofeo Sardo	Lancia Aurelia	Vinicio Puccini	3rd (1st in class)
3	1953	July 26	10 Hours of Messina	Lancia Aurelia	Alfredo Mariucci	16th
4	1953	August 15	12 Hours of Pescara	Lancia Aurelia	Gioacchino Vari	5th (1st in class)
5	1953	September 13	Coppa Inter-Europa	Lancia Aurelia		6th
6	1954	April 4	Giro di Sicilia	Ferrari 250 MM	Gaetano Spata	7th
7	1954	May 2	Mille Miglia	Ferrari 250 MM	Parisi; Giuseppe Maria Favero	DNF
8	1954	June 29	Trofeo Sardo	Ferrari 250 MM		2nd
9	1954	July 25	10 Hours of Messina	Ferrari 250 MM	Franco Meloni	2nd (1st in class)
10	1955	April 3	Giro di Sicilia	Ferrari		16th
11	1955	May 1	Mille Miglia	Lancia Aurelia	A. Lumbroso	190th
12	1955	September 11	Coppa Inter-Europa	Lancia Aurelia		9th
13	1955	October 16	Targa Florio	Lancia Aurelia	Gioacchino Vari	DNF
14	1956	April 8	Giro di Sicilia	Ferrari 250 GT	none	
15	1956	April 29	Mille Miglia	Ferrari 250 GT		DNA

== Resources ==
Information to be found in the resources beneath was used in both the introduction and the complete results table.

- Racing Sports Cars
- World Sports Racing Prototypes
- Formula 2 Register
- Mitorosso
- Barchetta...The Classic and Sports Car Portal
- classicscars.com
- J.M. Fangio – Un tributo al chueco...
- Vittorio Colocci career summary at DriverDB.com
- La Targa Florio
- Team DAN
