= Ferrari 250 MM =

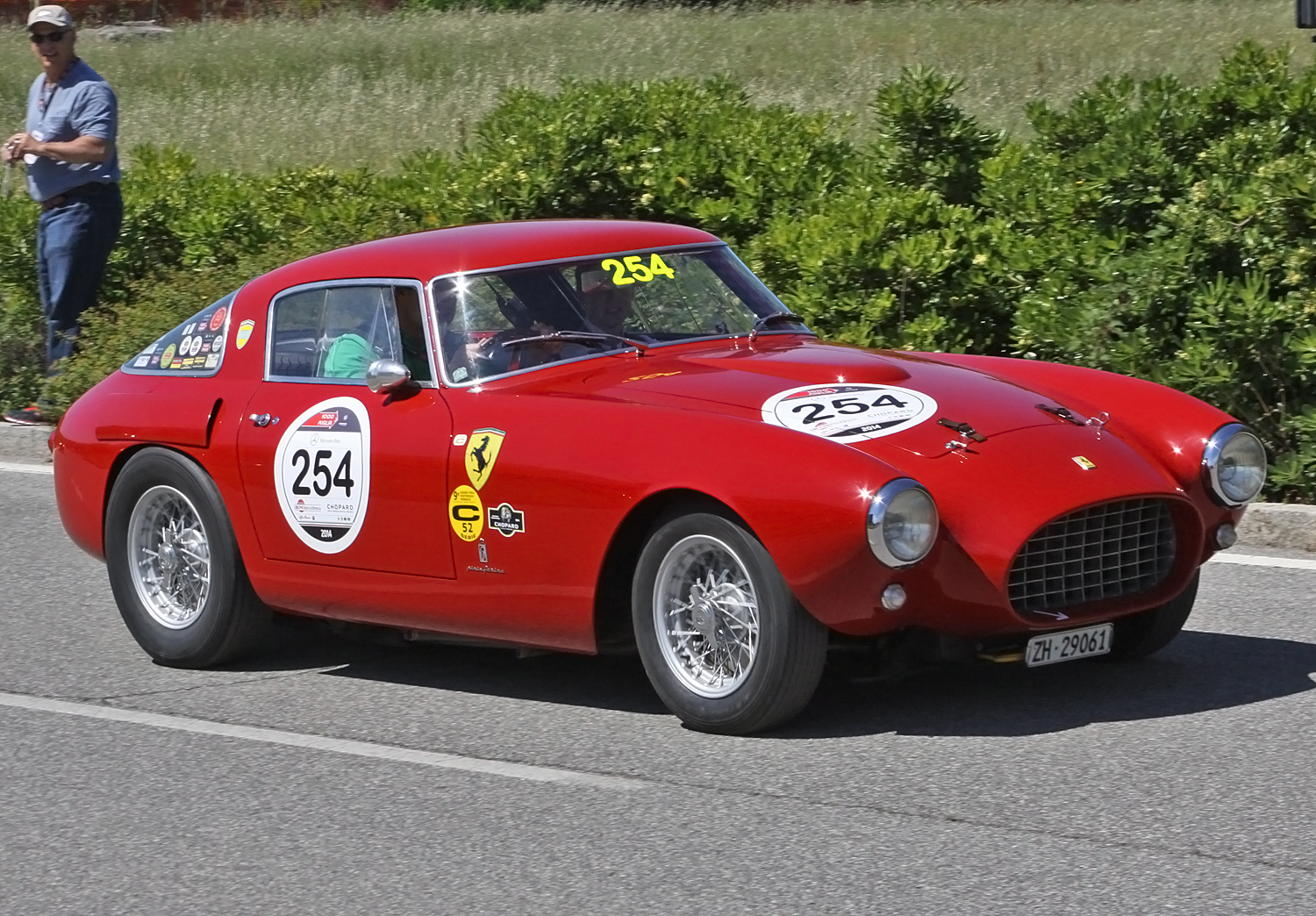

Overview
- Manufacturer: Ferrari
- Production: 1952–1954; 31 produced
- Designer: Giovanni Michelotti at Vignale; Pinin Farina

Body and chassis
- Body style: Spyder; Berlinetta
- Layout: Front mid-engine, rear-wheel-drive

Powertrain
- Engine: 3.0 L (2953.21 cc) Colombo V12
- Power output: 240 PS
- Transmission: 4-speed manual

Dimensions
- Wheelbase: 2,400 mm (94.5 in)
- Curb weight: 900 kg (1,984 lb) (dry, berlinetta); 850 kg (1,874 lb) (spyder)

Chronology
- Predecessor: Ferrari 250 S
- Successor: Ferrari 250 Monza; Ferrari 250 GT Berlinetta

The Ferrari 250 MM was a sports racing car produced by Ferrari from 1952 to 1954. After the initial racing successes of the 3.0-litre Colombo V12 engine, introduced in the 250 S one-off, Ferrari produced a serial racing model. It is best recognisable for the distinctive closed berlinetta bodywork by Pinin Farina. The "MM" in its name stood for the Mille Miglia race.

== Development ==
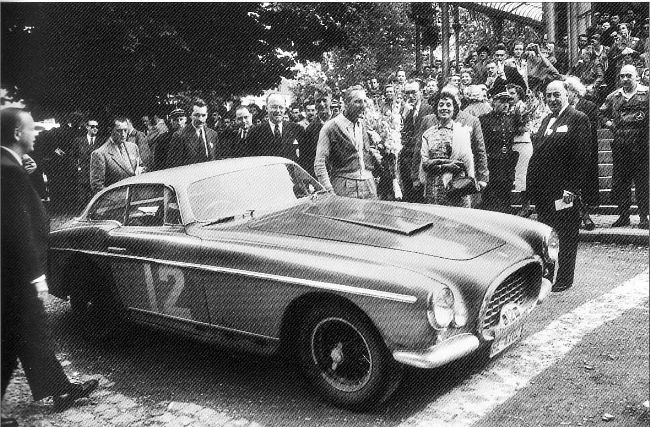
The only 250 MM Vignale-bodied berlinetta. Owned at one point by Peter Monteverdi.

The 250 MM was the second of the ubiquitous 3.0-litre Colombo-engined Ferraris. The engine was derived from the 250 S with increased power, due to a different carburettors setup. The whole car could be seen as an incremental evolution over its predecessor. Chassis numbers for the first time had "MM" in their suffix, and used an even, race car sequence.

Two body styles were available, each from a different coachbuilder. Pinin Farina designed an innovative closed berlinetta, which ushered in a whole new era in automotive design. It also served as a basis for future competition berlinetta models produced by Ferrari. Pinin Farina created in total eighteen 250 MMs with a berlinetta body. An open barchetta body was offered by Vignale and introduced in three series. Every example differed in slight detail from each other. Early series cars had open headlights and a small air vent in the middle of the bonnet. Later cars differed by having recessed and covered headlamps, a closed bonnet bulge, a triangular cutaways in the rear fenders and a lower door line. In total, twelve open spyders were made. Chief designer at Vignale was Giovanni Michelotti who penned all those designs.

The first 250 MM, in a spyder form, was presented in 1952 at the Paris Motor Show. The first berlinetta was also shown in Paris, but a year later.

A single berlinetta by Vignale, created in 1954, was owned at one point by Peter Monteverdi. In 1956 he had paid 10,000 Swiss francs for it and also traded in his Porsche 356. Its distinctive feature were the triple portholes on the bottom of the front fenders.

One particular example, initially s/n 0352MM, was restamped as 0239EU after a crashed 212 Inter, that was entered in the 1952 Carrera Panamericana. His owner, Efrain Ruiz Echeverria, traded it in for a new car that was renumbered in the factory to avoid import duty. By 1953 Ruiz Echeverria could enter another edition of the Mexican marathon. The car was for sale in 2011. Offered by Talacrest it was bought by Nick Mason.

Some examples, like the s/n 0266MM and 0356MM, used "166MM/53" type chassis but with a 3.0-litre, 250 MM-sourced engine. A single example of the Ferrari 340 MM Pinin Farina Berlinetta, that was raced by "Pagnibon", was downgraded to a 250 MM-specification for Andre Vanoni.

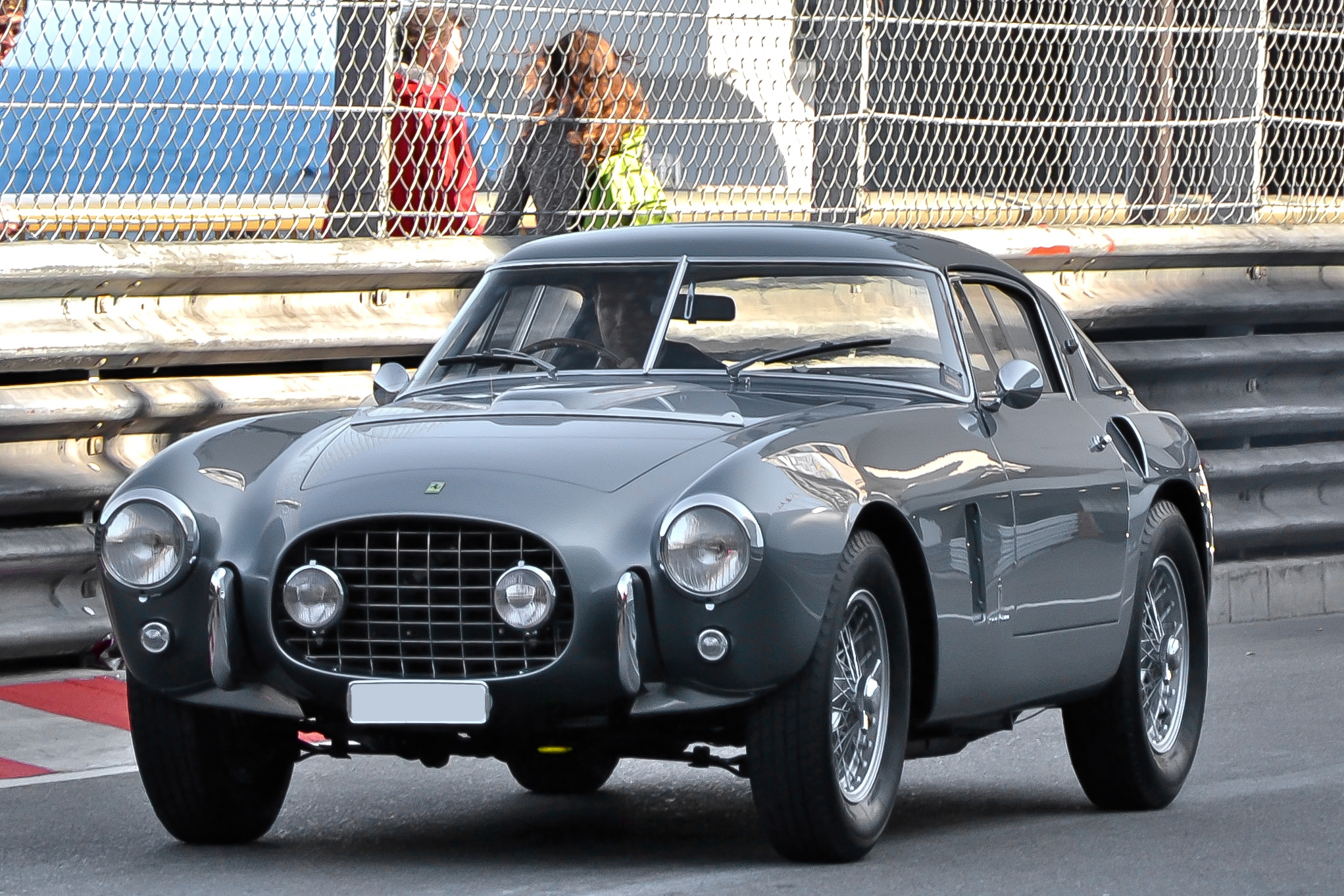
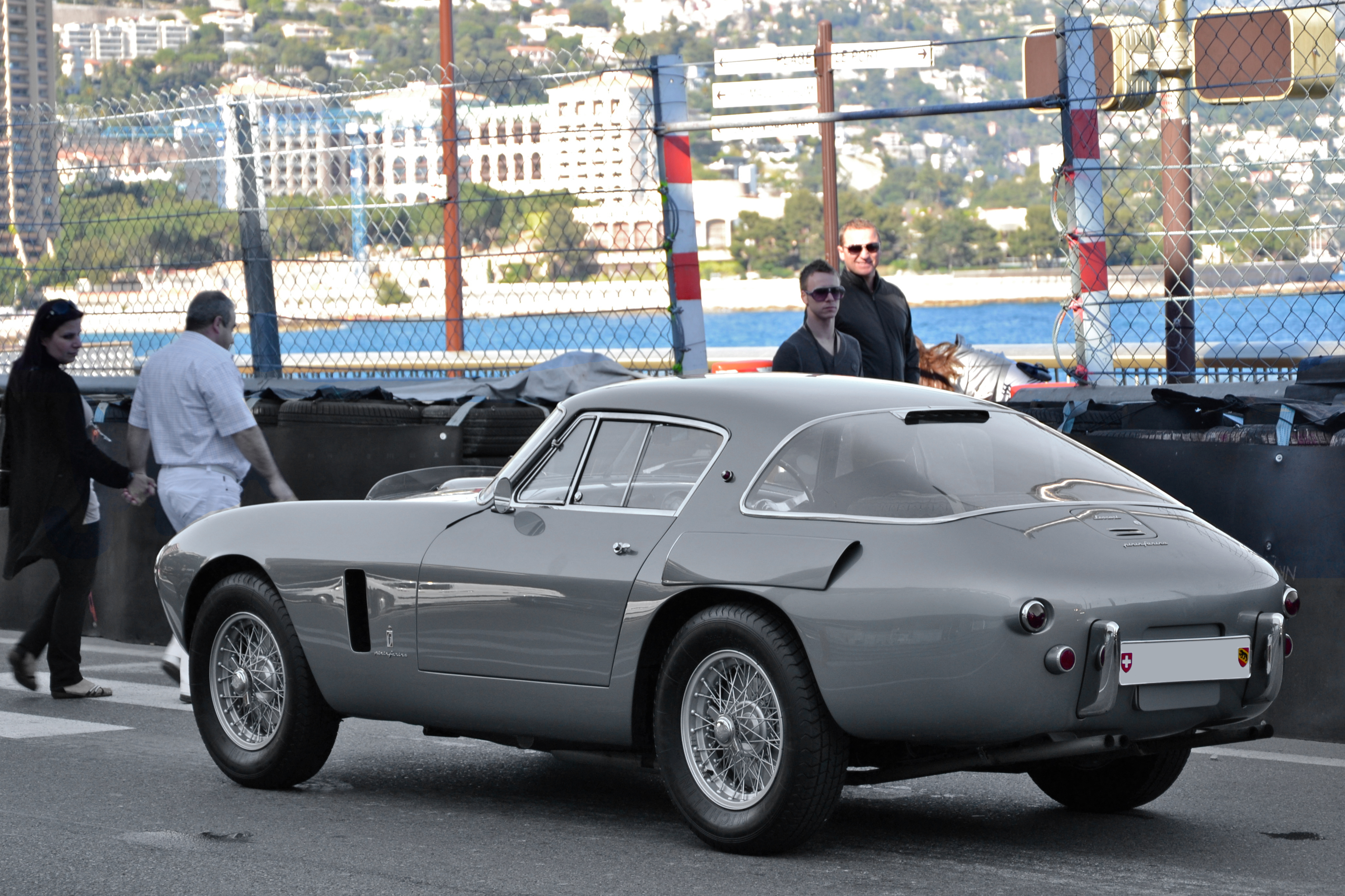
Ferrari 250 MM Pinin Farina Berlinetta

== Specifications ==
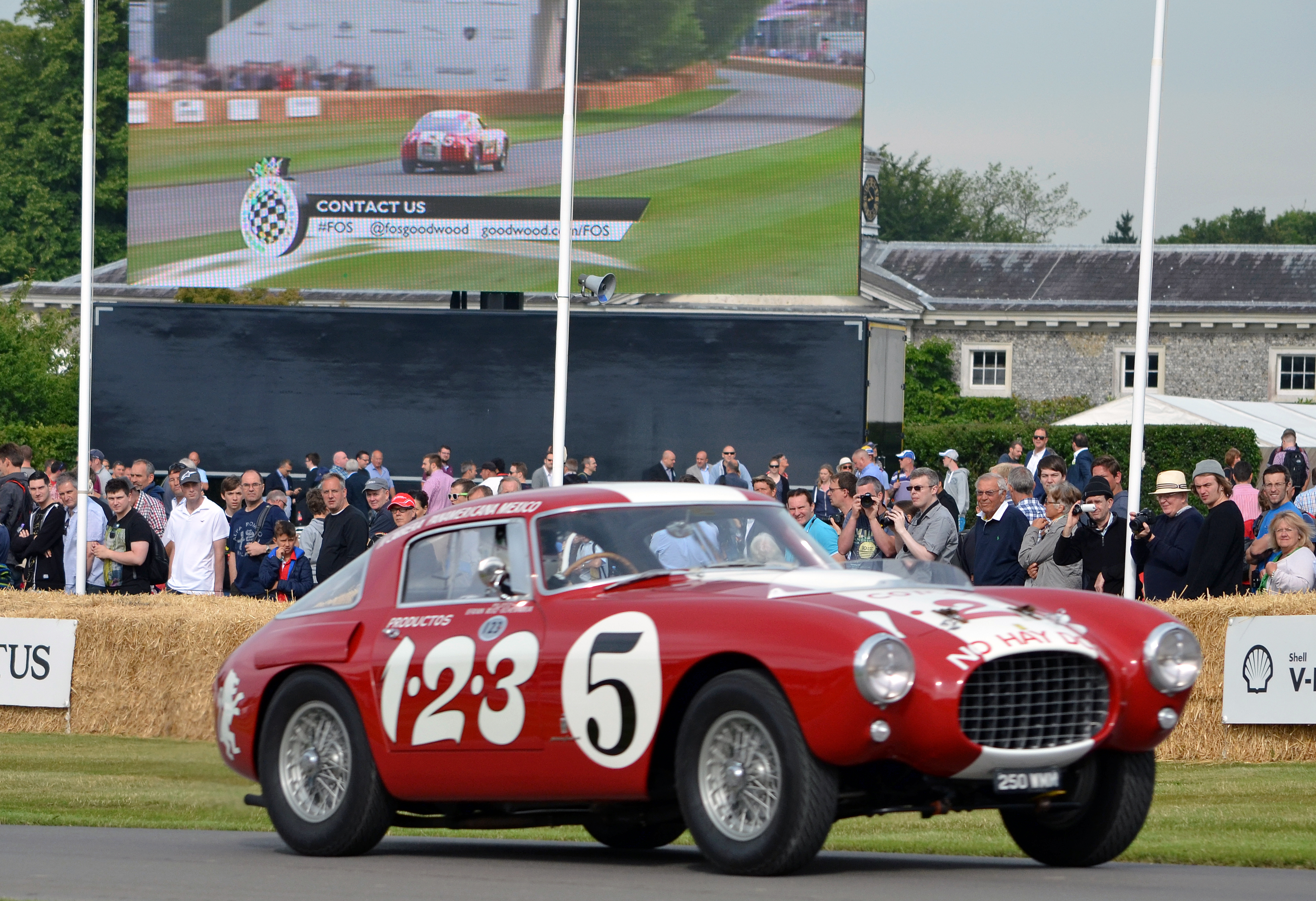
Ferrari 250 MM that raced in 1953 Carrera Panamericana

=== Engine and transmission ===
The engine, mounted longitudinally in the front, was a 60° Colombo V12. The total capacity of 2,953.21 cc (3.0 L; 180.2 cu in) was achieved thanks to 73 by 58.8 mm (2.9 by 2.3 in) of bore and stroke. A 9:1 compression ratio with three Weber 36IF/4C carburettors helped produce 240 PS (177 kW; 237 hp) at 7200 rpm. The engine had single overhead camshaft per cylinder bank, actuating two valves per cylinder. It also used a single spark plug per cylinder with two coils. The 250 MM had a new multi-plate clutch (the 250 S had only a single plate). A wet sump lubrication system was also inherited.

The 250 MM used a 4-speed, all-synchronised manual gearbox (The 250 S had a 5-speed). The top speed was 250 km/h.

=== Chassis ===
The chassis, reference 250MM53, was made out of a welded steel tubes and featured a 2,400 mm (94.5 in) short wheelbase. The whole car weighed 900 kg (1,984 lb) with its berlinetta body, when empty (The 250 S weighted 850 kg (1,874 lb)). The spyder was lighter at 850 kg (1,874 lb). The fuel tank had a huge 150-litres capacity.

=== Suspension ===
The suspension was similar to the previous model, the 250S. The front end had independent, unequal-length wishbones and transverse leaf-springs with Houdaille hydraulic shock absorbers. On the rear end, a live axle with more than traditional semi-elliptic springs and Houdaille hydraulic shock absorbers was mounted. Drum brakes were mounted on all four wheels.

== Racing ==
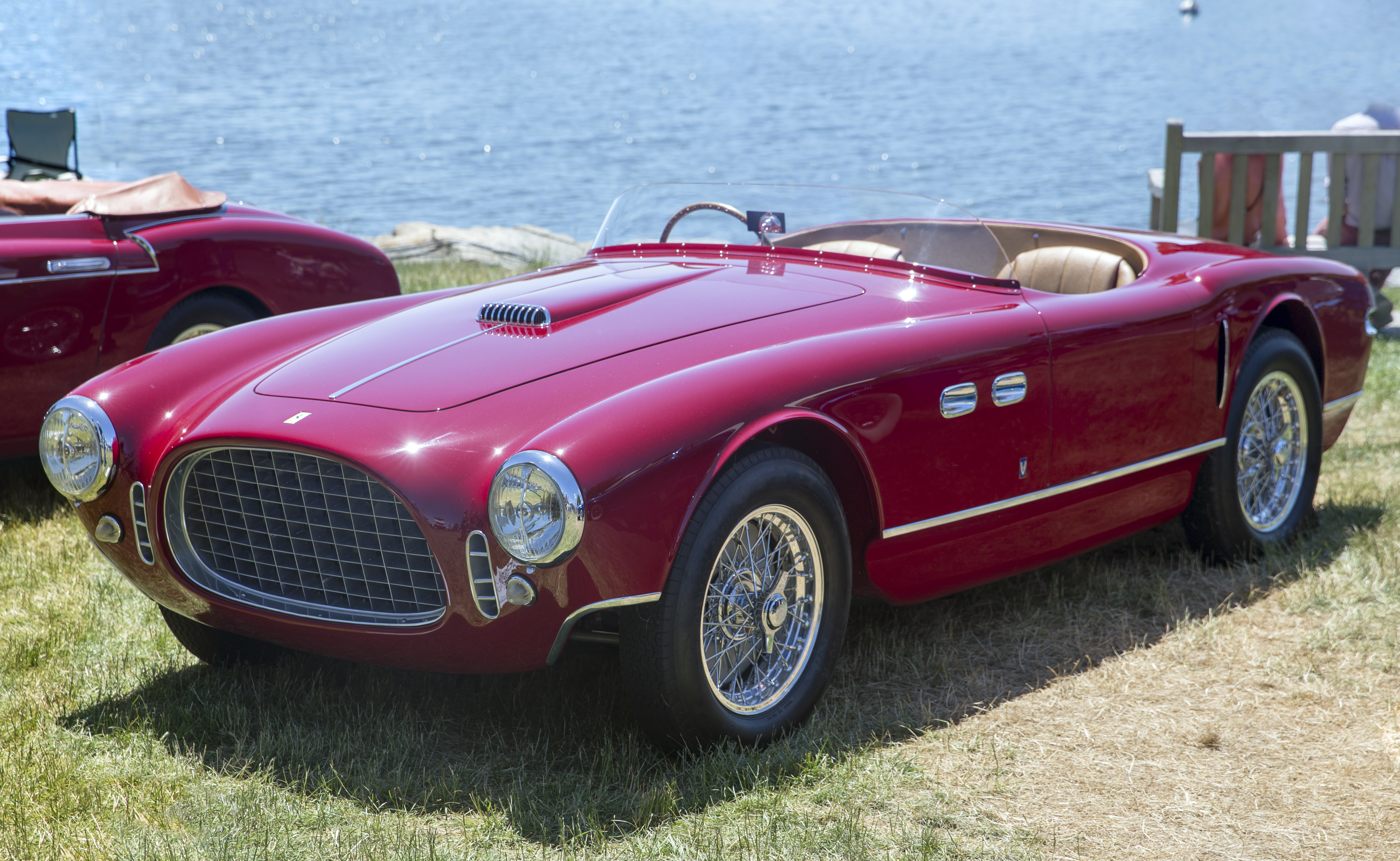
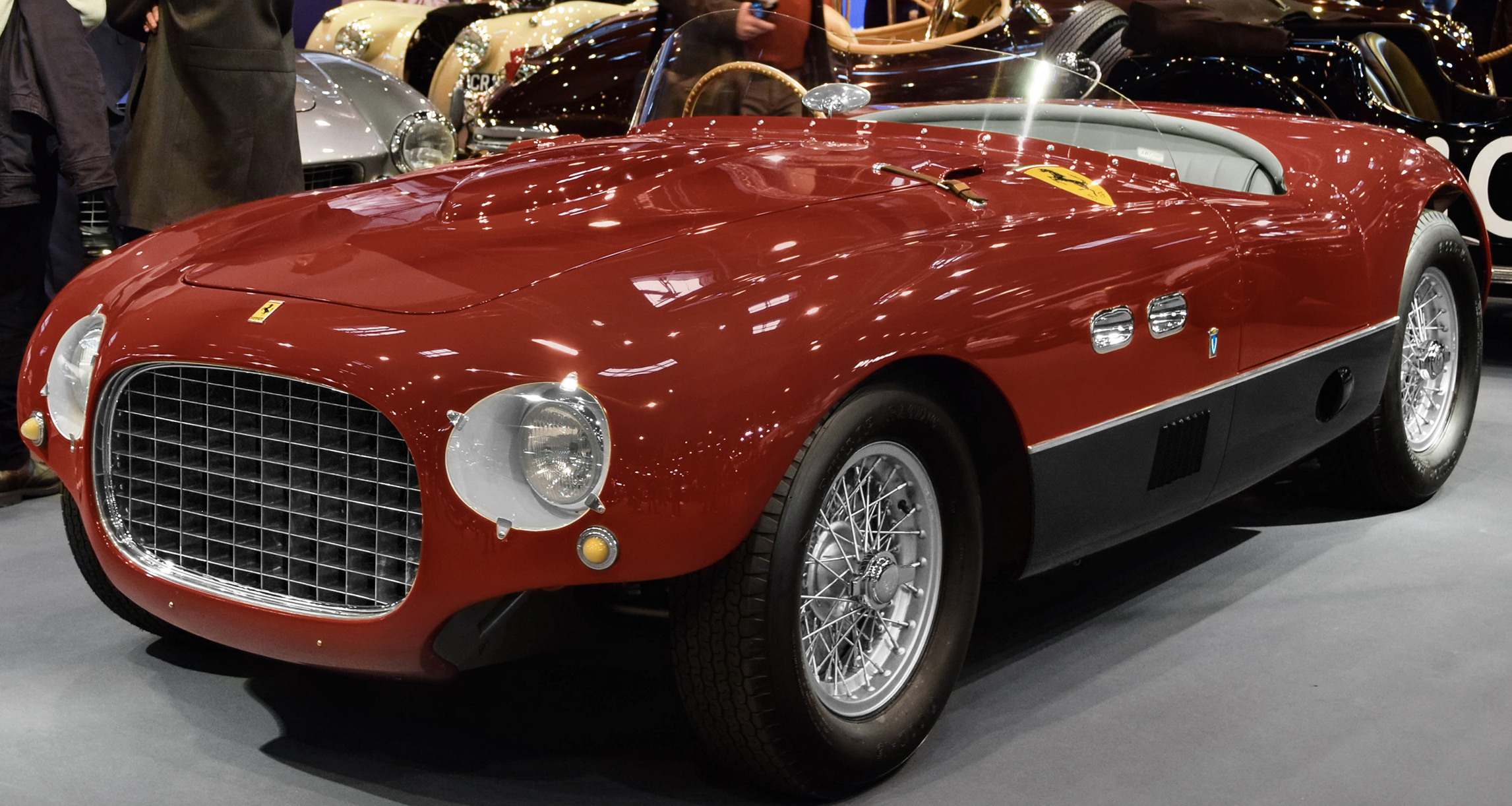
Ferrari 250 MM Vignale Spyder, early (top) and late (bottom) series

The Ferrari 250 MM was used extensively in racing. Scoring many victories in Europe. The 250 MM was also successful in the United States with Phil Hill and in South America as well.

The 250 MM had its first outing at the 1953 Giro di Sicilia. Three cars were entered, but none of them finished the race. Paolo Marzotto had led the race until Enna, but then broke down. The first victory came from the North American race track. At the Pebble Beach round of the SCCA National Sports Car Championship. In the category for Sports over 1500 cc, Phil Hill drove his spyder to the first place. At the Mille Miglia race, the same year, the race the car was destined for, a total of eight cars were entered. Only one managed to finish at all. Giulio Cabianca and Gianfranco Roghi drove their spyder s/n 0282MM, to the ninth place overall and eighth in-class. Paolo Marzotto and Marino Marini held a third place before their Berlinetta burst into flames a few kilometers before the finish.

At the 1953 edition of the Targa Florio, three 250 MMs were entered. Only one finished at the sixth place. Giulio Cabianca took it, driving for Scuderia Ferrari and using the same spyder as in the Mille Miglia. The Portuguese Grand Prix of 1953 brought 1–2 victory by José A. Nogueira Pinto and Casimiro de Oliveira. Both were driving Vignale-bodied cars. Out of four total cars that entered, others scored a fourth place and a DNF. At the GP Monza, the same year, Luigi Villoresi won in a Pinin Farina Berlinetta. Giuseppe Farina in a Vignale Spyder was third. He drove the same car as Cabianca before. A total of seven cars were entered on Monza. Others scored a fifth, sixth and ninth places and two DNFs.

Coppa d'Oro delle Dolomiti in 1953 also, saw Paolo Marzotto winning at the wheel of the Cabianca's spyder. Out of five entered cars, all have finished the race. At an endurance race called 10 Hours of Messina, five 250 MMs have been entered. The Eugenio Castellotti / Giulio Musitelli duo won the race. Franco Cornacchia with Giovanni Bracco came second. Others arrived at fifth, sixth and eighth places. Cornacchia later won the Trieste-Opicina hillclimb.

Following the early success in the States, Phil Hill won the Santa Barbara Trophy in 1953. He was still driving his spyder from the Pebble Beach. And at the 3rd Annual Madera Road Race, Hill chose a brand new Pinin Farina Berlinetta, that he shared with Bill Devin. Their car was painted white with a large blue stripe through the middle of the car. In a Modified +1.5 class he came first.

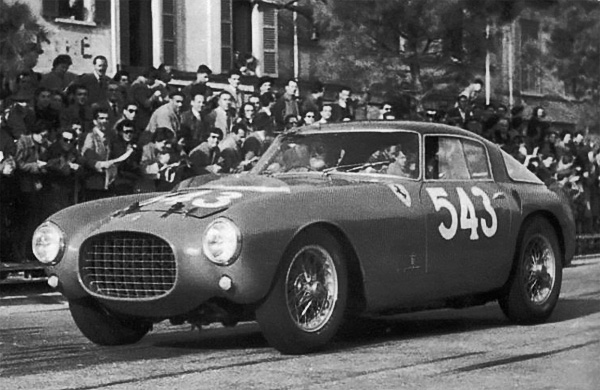
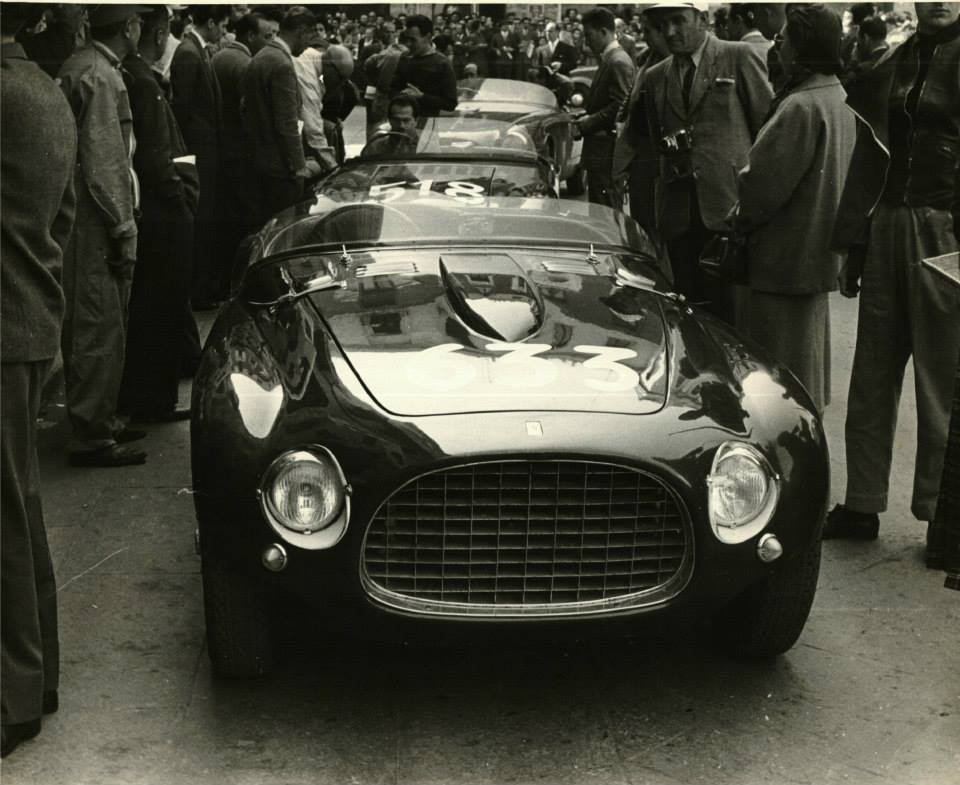
250 MM Berlinetta (top) and Spyder (bottom) at 1953 Mille Miglia

Coppa d'Oro di Sicilia in 1953 was won by Casimiro de Oliveira. Two other cars arrived at the fifth place or did not qualify at all. The last major race of that year was the 1953 Carrera Panamericana where Ruiz Echeverría and Villegas Becerril finished eleventh overall and seventh in-class. They drove a Pinin Farina Berlinetta that was renumbered for import purposes.

An involvement of the 250 MM on the racing scene continued throughout 1954. The 1000 km Buenos Aires was organised on an Autódromo Municipal-Avenida Paz in Argentina. The 250 MM Vignale Spyder, driven by Harry Schell and Alfonso de Portago, arrived at the finish line in second place, also scoring a class win. The overall winner was the much more powerful Ferrari 375 MM. At the Giro di Sicilia, the same year, Vittorio Colocci and Gaetano Spata finished seventh overall and fifth in-class, ironically just behind the 250 S, the predecessor of their model.

The last two major races of 1954 were the Mille Miglia and the Targa Florio. Five cars were entered for the Mille Miglia. Three arrived at the finish line and two did not. The best result was by a veteran Clemente Biondetti. He scored a fourth place overall and second place in-class. He drove a 250 MM barchetta that was rebodied in 1953 by Carrozzeria Morelli of Ferrara. The same year at the Targa Florio, the same 250 MM Morelli finished fifth overall and third in Sport +2.0 class also driven by Biondetti.

The 250 MM continued to be competitive all over the world. Scoring victories in the United States, South America and Sweden. Its racing career lasted unusually long, till 1962.

== Collectability ==
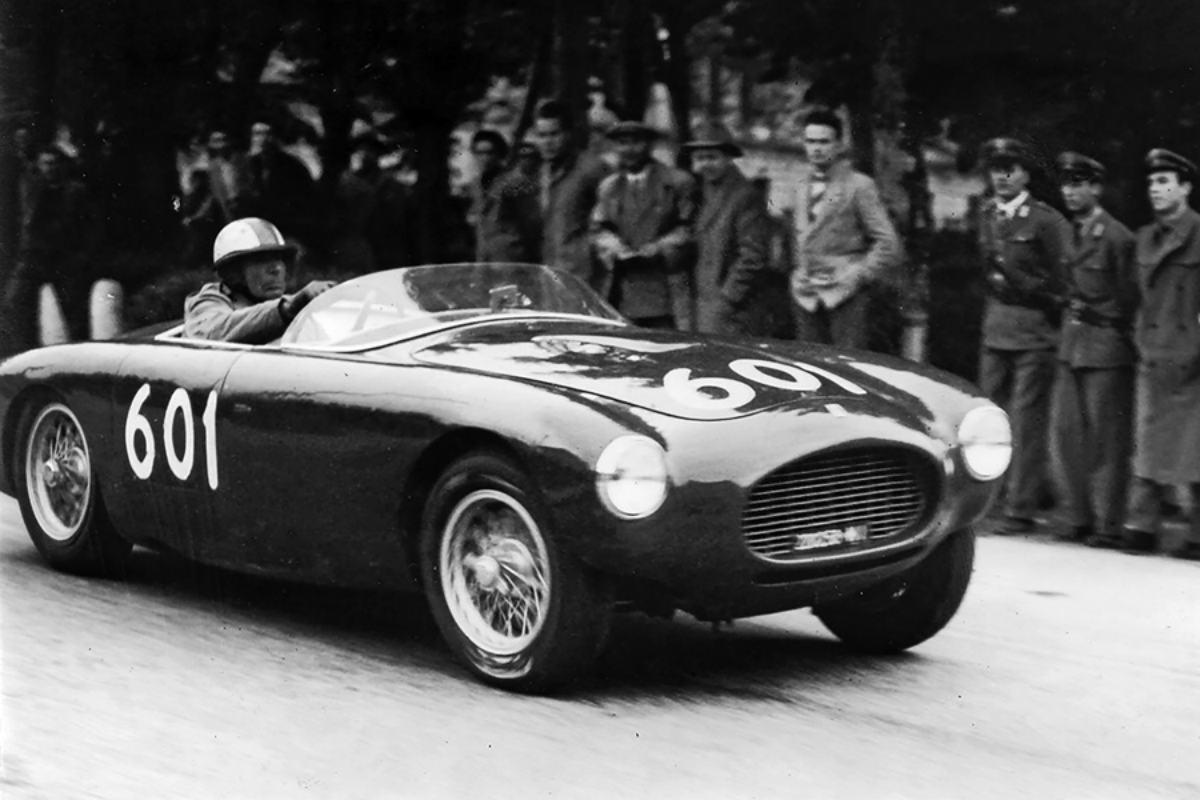
Biondetti driving 250 MM, rebodied as Morelli spider, to a 4th overall in 1954 Mille Miglia

A very limited production combined with an undisputed racing pedigree, makes for a highly sought after collector's car. Its estimated value will also increase thanks to the innovative design of the berlinetta model. Over the past years only a few examples were offered for sale and their value generally tend to rise. The Carrera Panamericana entrant, s/n 0352MM, was offered via Talacrest, a classic Ferrari dealer. The car was put on 2011 RM Sotheby's auction with an estimate of €2.5 - €3 million. It did not sell for a high bid of €2.15 million, but was later purchased by Nick Mason. Another example, an ex-Phil Hill white berlinetta, was sold for US$7.26 million at the Bonhams, Quail Lodge Auction in 2014. In 2018, the Swedish International Motor Show car was estimated at US$7.5 - US$9 million, but did not sell on auction. Gooding managed to sell a Vignale Spyder for US$5.395 million at the Scottsdale auction in 2019. Serial number 0256MM, driven by Eugenio Castellotti to victory in the 10 Hours of Messina, has been owned by collectors in the US, Japan and Germany, before returning to Italy in 2007.

== See also ==
- Ferrari 250
