= Ferrari 340 =

Topics referred to by the same term

Ferrari 340 may refer to:

- Ferrari 340 Mexico, a Ferrari race car from 1952
- Ferrari 340 MM, a Ferrari race car from 1953
- Ferrari 340 America, a Ferrari road car from 1950-1952
- Ferrari 340 F1, a Ferrari Formula One race car from 1950
