= Ferrari 375 MM =

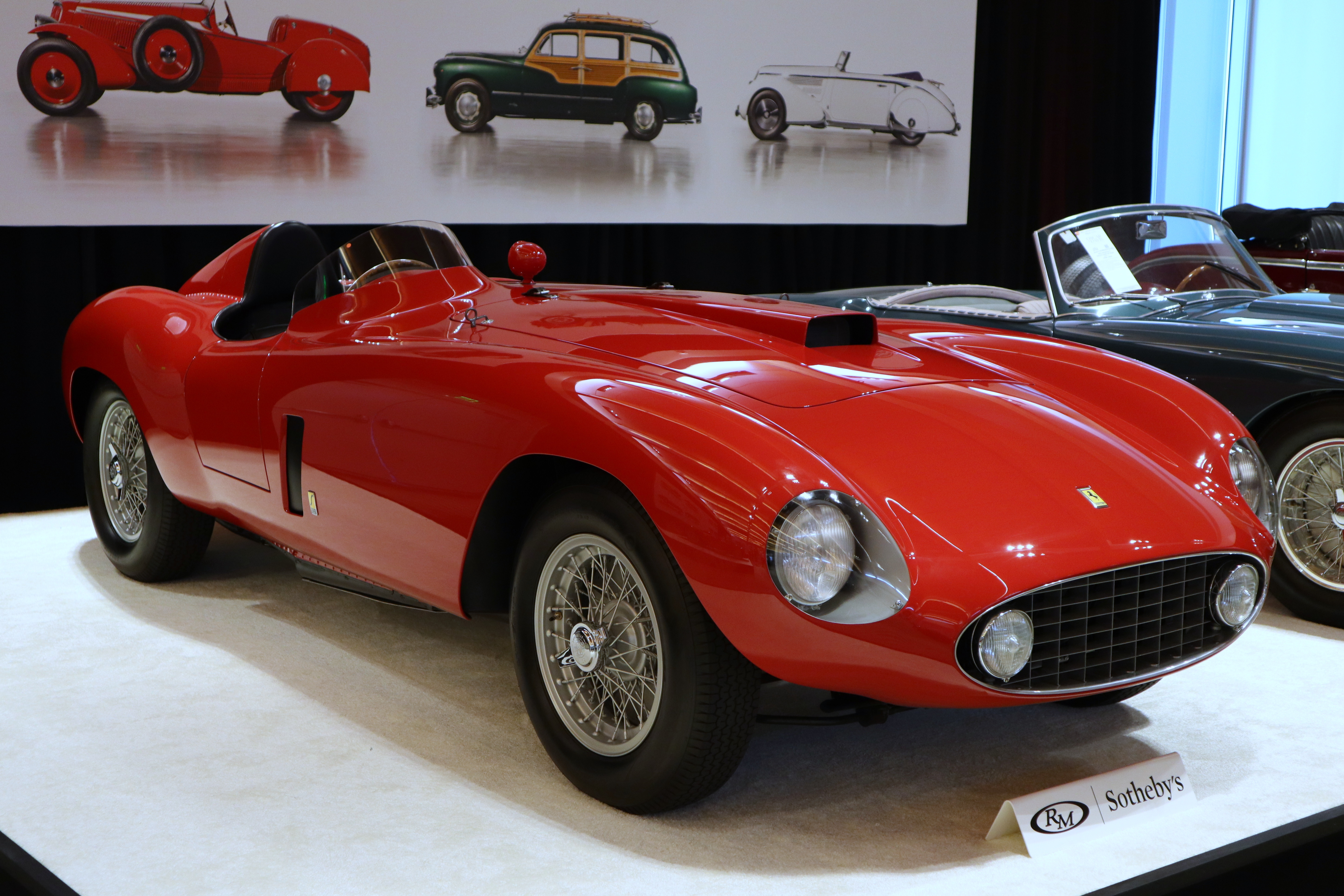
- 1953 Ferrari 375 MM Spider

Overview
- Manufacturer: Ferrari
- Production: 1953–1955; 26 made (four were converted from 340 MM)
- Designer: Pinin Farina

Body and chassis
- Class: Race car
- Body style: Spyder; Berlinetta; Coupé
- Layout: Front mid-engine, rear-wheel-drive

Powertrain
- Engine: 4.5 L (4493.73 cc) Tipo 102 Lampredi V12; 4.5 L (4522.68 cc) Tipo 108 Lampredi V12
- Power output: 340 PS
- Transmission: 4-speed manual

Dimensions
- Wheelbase: 2,600 mm (102.4 in)
- Curb weight: 900 kg (1,984 lb) (dry)

Chronology
- Predecessor: Ferrari 340 MM
- Successor: Ferrari 375 Plus

The Ferrari 375 MM, was a sports racing car produced by Ferrari from 1953 to 1955. It was named "375" for the unitary displacement of one cylinder in the 4.5 L V12 engine, and the "MM" stood for the Mille Miglia race. In total 26 units were made, including four converted from the 340 MM.

== Development ==
The first prototype was a Vignale Spyder and three next cars were Pinin Farina Berlinettas, all converted from the Ferrari 340 MM. Majority of the cars would be bodied by Pinin Farina in a spider style.

The engine was based on its Ferrari 375 F1 counterpart, but with shorter stroke and bigger bore, for the customer cars and unchanged for the factory ones.

Perhaps the most known 375 MM is the Pinin Farina "Bergman Coupé", s/n 0456AM, commissioned in 1954 by director Roberto Rossellini for his wife, actress Ingrid Bergman. Rossellini also owned another 375 MM spyder, s/n 0402AM, which sustained a crash and was rebodied into a coupe by Scaglietti. The Scaglietti coupe was subsequently bought by the Microsoft executive Jon Shirley and restored by Ferrari specialist Butch Dennison. It later became the first postwar Ferrari to win Best of Show at the Pebble Beach Concours d'Elegance.

The list of notable examples also includes a coupé created by Carrozzeria Ghia to a Giovanni Michelotti design. It was the last Ferrari ever to be bodied by this Turinese coachbuilder. The car was presented at the Torino Motor Show and the New York Auto Show, both in 1955.

== Specifications ==
=== Engine ===
The 375 MM was available with two different engines, both of around 4.5 L capacity. One was for customer cars and the other for the factory teams. Factory race drivers received a straight derivative of the Formula One unit from the 375 F1. Designated as the tipo 102, it had the same total capacity of 4493.73 cc from the same internal measurements as the 375 F1, at 80 by 74.5 mm (3.1 by 2.9 in) of bore and stroke. The new updated engine, codenamed as the tipo 108, was reserved for the customer cars. The engine had a changed capacity of 4522.68 cc, thanks to its 84 by 68 mm (3.3 by 2.7 in) of bore and stroke, and would also be mounted in the 375 America road car. Both versions used three Weber 40IF/4C or 42DCZ carburettors and could produce 340 PS (250 kW; 335 hp) at 7000 rpm.

=== Chassis and suspension ===
The chassis was of a tipo 102 designation and was derived from its predecessor, the 340 MM, also made out of welded steel tubes. Wheelbase was slightly longer than before, now at 2,600 mm (102.4 in). The suspension setup was also inherited from the 340 MM, but with an addition of the Houdaille-type hydraulic shock absorbers in the front and rear.

== Racing ==
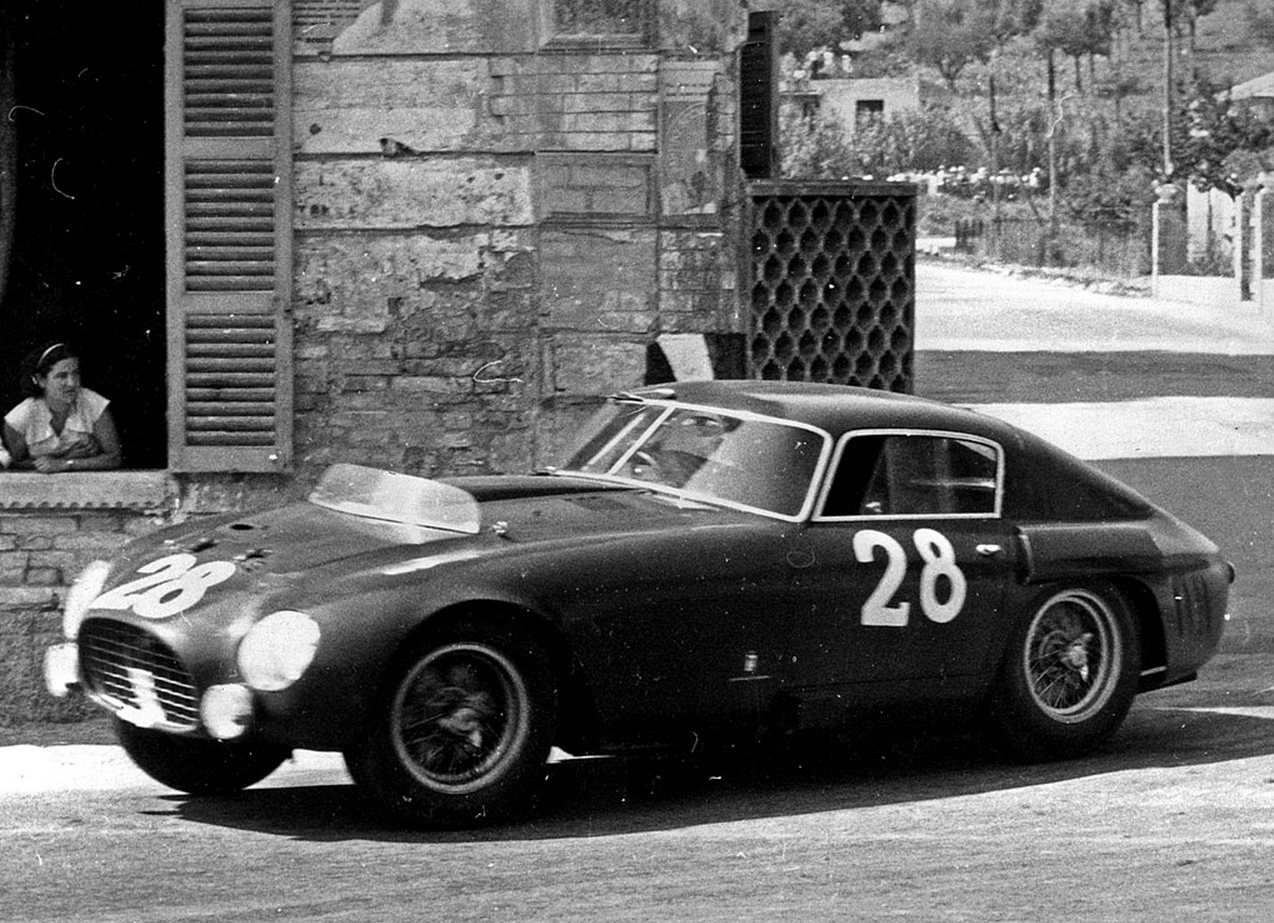
#0320AM winning 1953 Pescara Grand Prix

Although intended for the Mille Miglia, the 375 MM was also raced with limited success in the Carrera Panamericana, scoring fourth place in 1953 and finishing second in 1954. Other major successes in 1953 included overall wins at Spa 24 Hours, driven by Giuseppe Farina and Mike Hawthorn duo, 12 Hours of Pescara with Hawthorn and Umberto Maglioli and 12 Hours of Casablanca, won by Farina and Piero Scotti. The 375 MM with Alberto Ascari and Luigi Villoresi, was contesting the 1953 24 Hours of Le Mans alongside its 4.1-litre siblings, to no avail due to a clutch problems. In the 1000 km Nürburgring race of 1953, the 375 MM scored another victory with Giuseppe Farina, this time aided by Alberto Ascari. This race along with Spa 24 Hours counted towards the 1953 World Sportscar Championship, won for Ferrari in due honour to the 375 MM.

In 1954 in Argentina, Giuseppe Farina with Umberto Maglioli won the 1000 km Buenos Aires, that was a championship race. On 760 km track of Coppa della Toscana, Piero Scotti won in the 375 MM ahead of Gordini. Later, the 375 MM competed in races in Europe, South and North Americas, winning many of them. The car did not score any more championship points as it was replaced by a bigger displacement derivative, the 375 Plus.

Individual cars

| model | chassis | coachbuilder | body | comment | image |
|---|---|---|---|---|---|
| 375 MM | 0286AM | Vignale | Spider | based on 340 MM, Phil Hill drove it to second place in the 1954 Carrera Panamericana | |
| 375 MM | 0318AM | Pinin Farina | Berlinetta | based on 340 MM, crashed in 1953 Carrera Panamericana where drivers Antonio Stagnoli and Giuseppe Scotuzzi died | at 1953 24 Hours of Le Mans |
| 375 MM | 0320AM | Pinin Farina | Berlinetta | based on 340 MM | (video, video) |
| 375 MM | 0322AM | Pinin Farina | Berlinetta | based on 340 MM | |
| 375 MM | 0358AM | Pinin Farina | Berlinetta | | at 1953 Carrera Panamericana |
| 375 MM | 0360AM | Pinin Farina | Spider | Winner of 1953 12 Hours of Casablanca and 1954 Coppa della Toscana | at 1954 Coppa della Toscana |
| 375 MM | 0362AM | Pinin Farina | Spider | Once driven by Dan Gurney. | (video) |
| 375 MM | 0364AM | Pinin Farina | Spider | Pontoon rear fenders. Sold for US$9 million i 2013. | |
| 375 MM | 0366AM | Pinin Farina | Spider | Crashed in 1953 at Casablanca. Rebodied by Scaglietti in 1955 | |
| 375 MM | 0368AM | Pinin Farina | Berlinetta | | |
| 375 MM | 0370AM | Pinin Farina | Spider | | (video video) |
| 375 MM | 0372AM | Pinin Farina | Spider | | (video) |
| 375 MM | 0374AM | Pinin Farina | Spider | | (video) |
| 375 MM | 0376AM | Pinin Farina | Spider | | at Maranello, 2017 |
| 375 MM | 0378AM | Pinin Farina | Berlinetta | | |
| 375 MM | 0380AM | Pinin Farina | Berlinetta | | |
| 375 MM | 0382AM | Pinin Farina | Spider | the only unrestored 375 MM, at Pebble Beach 2010. Raced by Bill Spear, owned for over 30 years by physicist J. B. Gunn. | (video) |
| 375 MM | 0402AM | Pinin Farina | Spider | Initially owned by Roberto Rossellini. Rebodied 1955 by Carrozzeria Scaglietti | (video |
| 375 MM | 0412AM | Pinin Farina | Spider | | (video) |
| 375 MM | 0416AM | Pinin Farina | Berlinetta | | |
| 375 MM | 0450AM | Pinin Farina | Spider | rebodied | |
| 375 MM | 0456AM | Pinin Farina | Berlinetta | Commissioned by Roberto Rossellini for his wife Ingrid Bergman, in a new color later available for all Ferraris as "Grigio Ingrid." | |
| 375 MM | 0460AM | Pinin Farina | Spider | | |
| 375 MM | 0472AM | Pinin Farina | Berlinetta | | at Pebble Beach, 2006 |
| 375 MM | 0476AM | Ghia | Coupé | | (video) |
| 375 MM | 0490AM | Pinin Farina | Coupé | "Speciale", on display Turin Auto Show 1955 | |

== Racing results ==
(key)

| Year | Entrant | Chassis | 1 | 2 | 3 | 4 | 5 | 6 | 7 |
| 1953 | — | | (United States) SEB | (Italy) MMI | (France) LMS | (Belgium) SPA | (Germany) NÜR | (United Kingdom) TTR | (Mexico) PAN |
|---|---|---|---|---|---|---|---|---|---|
| 1953 | (Italy) Scuderia Ferrari^{1} | 0318AM | | | Ret | Ret | | | Ret |
| 1953 | (Italy) Scuderia Ferrari^{1} | 0320AM | | | | Ret | | | 4 |
| 1953 | (Italy) Scuderia Ferrari^{1} | 0322AM | | | | 1 | DNS | | 6 |
| 1953 | (Italy) Scuderia Ferrari^{1} | 0358AM | | | | | | | Ret |
| 1953 | (Italy) Scuderia Ferrari^{1} | 0286AM | | | | | 1 | | |
| 1953 | (United States) Luigi Chinetti | 0286AM | | | | | | | DSQ |
| 1954 | — | | (Argentina) BUE | (United States) SEB | (Italy) MMI | (France) LMS | (United Kingdom) TTR | (Mexico) PAN | |
| 1954 | (Italy) Scuderia Ferrari | 0370AM | 1 | | | | | | |
| 1954 | (Argentina) Carlo Bonomi | 0358AM | | | | | | DSQ | |
| 1954 | (Italy) Piero Scotti | 0360AM | | | Ret | | | | |
| 1954 | (United States) Briggs Cunningham | 0372AM | | Ret | | Ret | | | |
| 1954 | (Argentina) José-Maria Ibanez | 0374AM | Ret | | | | | | |
| 1954 | (United States) Luigi Chinetti | 0376AM | | | | | | 6 | |
| 1954 | (Italy) Innocente Baggio | 0380AM | | | | Ret | | | |
| 1954 | (United States) William Spear | 0382AM | | Ret | | | | | |
| 1954 | (United States) Allen Guiberson | 0286AM | | | | | | 2 | |
| 1955 | — | | (Argentina) BUE | (United States) SEB | (Italy) MMI | (France) LMS | (United Kingdom) TTR | (Italy) TGA | |
| 1955 | (Argentina) Carlo Bonomi | 0358AM | Ret | | | | | | |
| 1955 | (Italy) Piero Scotti | 0360AM | | | Ret | | | | |
| 1955 | (United States) Tony Parravano | 0362AM | | Ret | | | | | |
| 1955 | (Argentina) Carlos Najurieta | 0374AM | 2 | | | | | | |
| 1955 | (United States) John Shakespeare | 0376AM | | Ret | | | | | |
| 1956 | — | | (Argentina) BUE | (United States) SEB | (Italy) MMI | (West Germany) NÜR | (Sweden) SWE | | |
| 1956 | (Argentina) Carlo Bonomi | 0358AM | Ret | | | | | | |
| 1956 | (Sweden) Tore Bjurström | 0366AM | | | | | 5 | | |
| 1956 | (Argentina) Carlos Najurieta | 0374AM | Ret | | | | | | |

1. Factory cars ran the 1953 Carrera under Scuderia Guastalla
