= Ferrari 275 S =

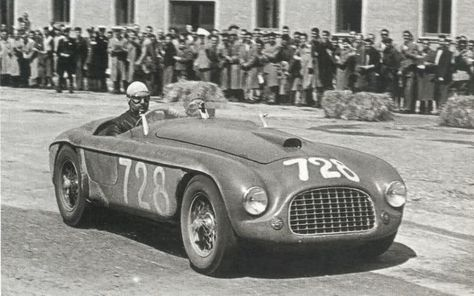
- Alberto Ascari in Ferrari 275 S during 1950 Mille Miglia

Overview
- Manufacturer: Ferrari
- Also called: Ferrari 275 Sport
- Production: 1950; 2 produced
- Designer: Federico Formenti at Carrozzeria Touring

Body and chassis
- Body style: Barchetta
- Layout: Front mid-engine, rear-wheel-drive
- Related: Ferrari 275 F1

Powertrain
- Engine: 3.3 L (3322.34 cc) Lampredi V12
- Power output: 270 PS
- Transmission: 5-speed manual

Dimensions
- Wheelbase: 2,250 mm (88.6 in)
- Curb weight: 850 kg (1,874 lb) (dry)

Chronology
- Successor: Ferrari 340 America; Ferrari 340 Mexico/MM

The Ferrari 275 S was a sports racing car produced by Ferrari in 1950. It was the first Ferrari powered by a new Aurelio Lampredi-designed V12 engine, created as a large displacement alternative to the initial 1,5 L Colombo V12, used in supercharged form in Ferrari 125 F1. Formula One regulations allowed for up to 4.5 L in naturally aspirated form.

== Development ==
The naturally-aspirated, then supercharged Colombo engine did not fulfil its expectations in Grands Prix and Formula One, and an alternative was required for Ferrari to stay competitive. Aurelio Lampredi designed the new V12 engine that was intended for Formula One race cars, but first had to be tested in a sports racing car. Only two examples were ever created. Both had Touring barchetta bodywork. None of them survive in their original form.

== Specifications ==
The new 'long-block' engine displaced 3,322.34 cc (3.3 L; 202.7 cu in), thanks to 72 by 68 mm (2.8 by 2.7 in) of bore and stroke and had SOHC configuration with two valves and single spark plug per cylinder. Initially power output was 270 PS (199 kW; 266 hp) at 7200 rpm with 8:1 compression ratio. Engine was fed by three Weber 40DCF carburettors and used wet sump lubrication. Top speed was 240 km/h.

The chassis was a ladder frame aided by steel tubes of a short, 2,250 mm (88.6 in), wheelbase, derived from 166 MM. This value will change when upgraded to 340 America specification. Front suspension was independent and rear had a live axle with semi-elliptic springs. Stopping was by four-wheel drum brakes.

== Racing ==
The 1950 edition of Mille Miglia race was attended by both examples of 275 S. Alberto Ascari with Senesio Nicolini drove 0030MT and Luigi Villoresi with Pasquale Cassani raced in 0032MT. Both teams encountered transmission problems, that could not cope with high amounts of power, and did not finish the race. Cars raced only a couple more times in its 275 S guise. Despite poor initial results the engine proved its desired potential and was immediately used for a single-seater Ferrari 275 F1, as was its original purpose.

== 275 S/340 America ==
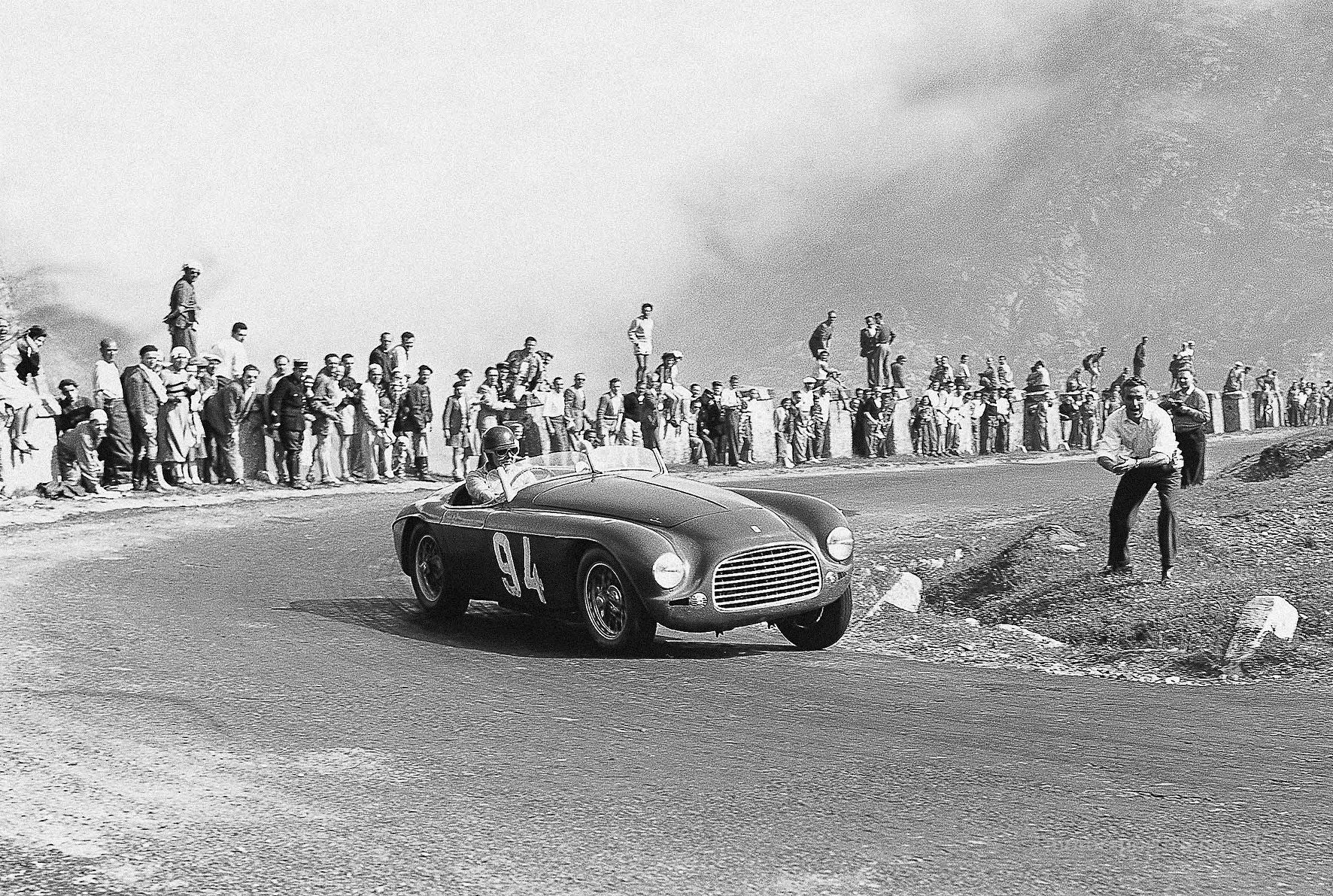
275 S/340 America Touring Barchetta at 1951 Susa-Moncenisio hillclimb

Between 1950 and 1951 both cars were upgraded with the new 4.1 L, also Lampredi, engines, that in turn were derived from Formula One powerplants. After conversion power dropped to 220 PS (162 kW; 217 hp). Now converted into 340 America model-line, one car s/n 0030MT was further rebodied by a new coachbuilder, Scaglietti, after 1952. The other car remained in the original Touring barchetta form. S/n 0030MT was auctioned in 2015 by RM Sotheby's in Monterey for almost US$8 million.
