= Ferrari 625 =

Ferrari 625 may refer to three different cars created by Ferrari to use the Ferrari Lampredi engine (Tipo 625):

- 1953 625 TF sports racer
- 1954 625 F1 Formula One racer
- 1956 625 LM sports racer
