= 1953 Mille Miglia =

World sportscar championship

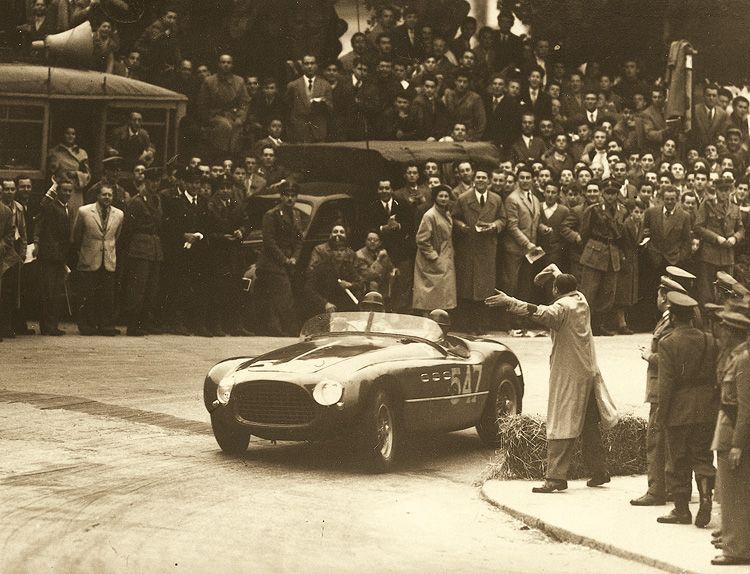
Marzotto and Crosara in the winning Ferrari 340 MM

The 1953 Mille Miglia was the second round of the 1953 F.I.A. World Sportscar Championship and was held on the open road of Italy, on 26 April 1953. The route was a round trip between Brescia and Rome, with a start/finish in Brescia.

A total of 577 cars were entered in the 1953 Mille Miglia, across eight classes based on engine size, ranging from up to 750 cc to over 2.0 litre, for both touring cars and sport cars. Of these, 490 cars started the event. The smaller displacement, slower cars started first, with each car number relating to their allocated start time. For example, Juan-Manuel Fangio’s car had the number 602, and he left Brescia at 6:02 am, while the first cars had started late in the evening of the previous day.

== Report ==
=== Entry ===
Alfa Romeo entered in force with the Alfa Romeo 6C 3000 CM to be driven by Fangio, Karl Kling, and Consalvo Sanesi.

Scuderia Lancia had assembled a veteran team consisting of Piero Taruffi, four-time winner Clemente Biondetti, Umberto Maglioli, Felice Bonetto and Franco Bornigia, with the first four driving their D20 2900.

Ferrari for their part arrived with four 300 bhp, 4.1 litre Ferrari 340 MM Spyder Vignales for Luigi Villoresi, Giuseppe Farina, Giannino Marzotto and the American racer Tom Cole.

For 1953, the Mille Miglia was a round of the new World Sports Car Championship, and the home teams faced strong challengers. From Great Britain came Aston Martin and Jaguar, while France sent Gordini.

=== Race ===
The race started at 22:01 on 25 April, when P.J. Darquier departed Brescia in his Renault 4CV/1063. The faster cars would leave the following morning, when conditions were warm and dry. After nine and half hours, through the night and early morning, all the cars were on their way to Rome.

The Alfas took the early lead, with Sanesi controlling the pace, averaging 113 mph on the leg to Verona, but his drive ended with an accident on the road to Rome. The Ferrari of Farina had crashed out, and Kling assumed the lead, only to retire from an accident himself.

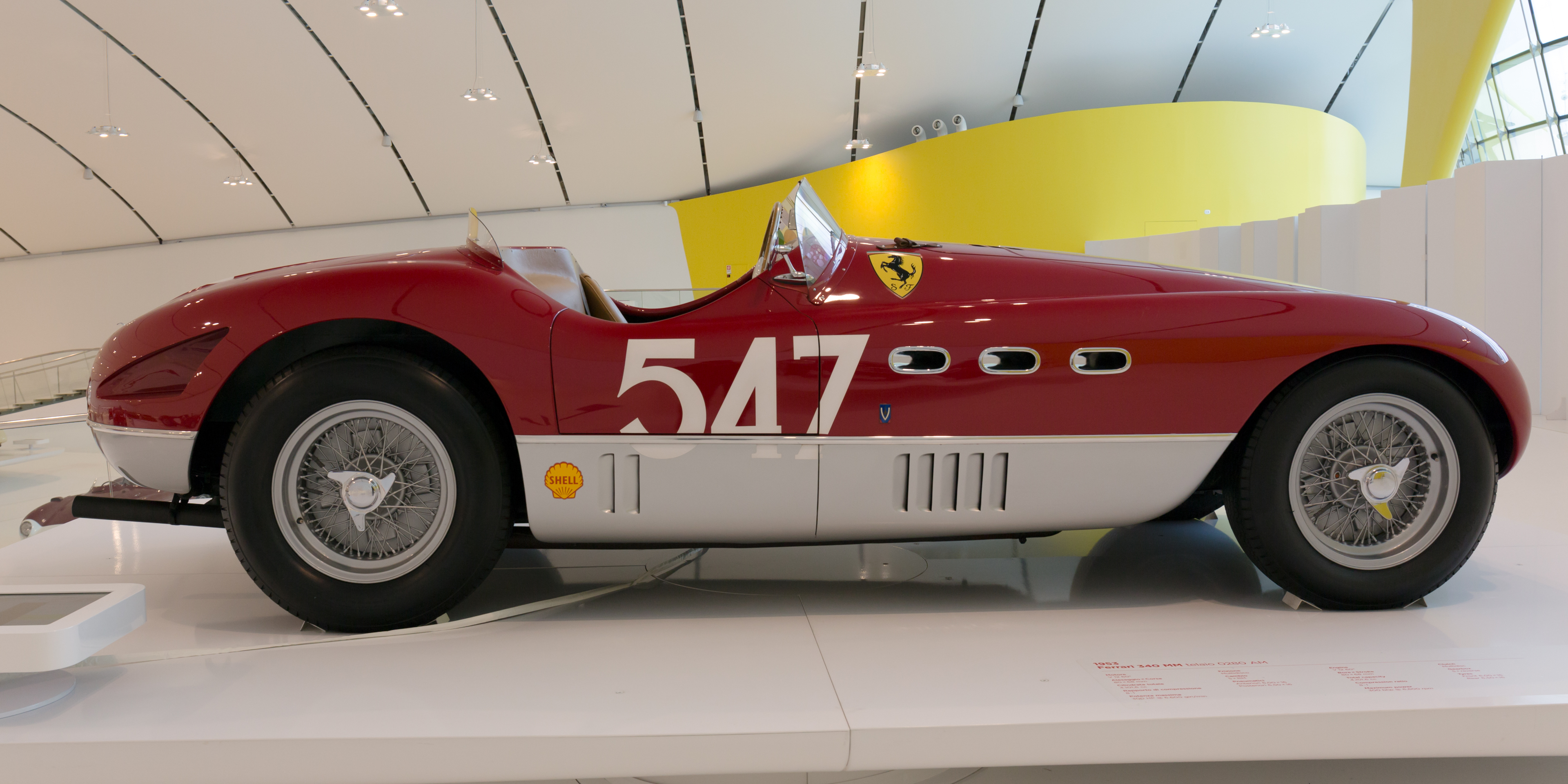
Ferrari 340 MM Spyder Vignale which won in the hands of Giannino Marzotto, pictured in the Enzo Ferrari Museum

Just past Siena, Marzotto was concerned that the Ferrari mechanics had not changed his engine oil at the last control point as they were unable to open the bonnet. After making a U-turn, he raced back to Siena, where his mechanics cut a hole in the bonnet, directly over the engines oil filler cap, and topped the oil up accordingly. Meanwhile, Fangio’s Alfa was now leading, but surrendered to the chasing Marzotto when his steering started to play up along with fading brakes. When Marzotto got to Bologna, he had broken the 15-year old record for crossing the Futa Pass. Although Marzotto suffered two minor crashes, he took it all the way to Brescia, to win his second Mille Miglia, repeating his success of 1950. In second place with a remarkable drive was Fangio. For most of the return leg, his Alfa had effective steering on only one front wheel.

Marzotto, partnered by his navigator, Marco Crosara, won in a time of 10hr 37:19mins., averaging a speed of 88.96 mph. 11:44mins adrift in second place was the Alfa Romeo 6C 3000 CM of Fangio. The third car on the podium was the Lancia of Bonetto. Another Ferrari came home in fourth, driven by Cole. The top Aston Martin was fifth in the hands of Reg Parnell. Apart from Aston Martin’s fifth place, the other foreign challenges faded away. Belgian journalist Paul Frère won the unlimited touring class in an unlikely 5.3-litre Chrysler Saratoga saloon.

The race had drama. Film director Roberto Rossellini drove a Ferrari. Having recently married film star Ingrid Bergman, he raced against her wishes. At Rome, she flung herself across the car and refused to move until he agreed to withdraw.

Typical of the Mille Miglia, the event was marred by fatal accidents. The first cost the French navigator, Pierre-Gilbert Ugnon, his life when his driver Luc Descollanges crashed the Jaguar C-Type near Ferrara about 140 miles (224 km) into their race. Descollanges was badly injured and was unconscious for 3 days but managed to make a full recovery. Two spectators were also killed. 48-year old Auerlio Turci was hit by a Porsche 356 being driven by Juan Iturralde and future FIA president Paul Metternich in a suburb of Cesena near Rimini and San Marino, 220 miles (352 km) into the route. Several spectators standing with Turci were also injured by the Porsche. And in Ancona, 70 miles further down the Adriatic coast, a twelve-year-old boy was killed after a Fiat 1100 crashed into a group of spectators.

== Classification ==
=== Mille Miglia ===
Of the 490 starters, 283 were classified as finishers. Therefore, only a selection of notably racers has been listed below.

Class Winners are in Bold text.

Pos.	No.	Class	Driver	Navigator	Entrant	Car - Engine	Time	Reason Out
1st	**547**	**S+2.0**	**(Italy) Giannino Marzotto**	**(Italy) Marco Crosara**		**Ferrari 340 MM Vignale**	**10hr 37:19**	
2nd	602	S+2.0	(Argentina) Juan Manuel Fangio	(Italy) Giulio Sala	S. P. A. Alfa Romeo	Alfa Romeo 6C 3000 CM	10hr 49:03	
3rd	606	S+2.0	(Italy) Felice Bonetto	(Italy) U Peruzzi	Scuderia Lancia	Lancia D20 Pinin Farina	11hr 07:40	
4th	608	S+2.0	(United States) Tom Cole	(Switzerland) Mario Vandelli		Ferrari 340 MM Vignale	11hr 20:39	
5th	611	S+2.0	(United Kingdom) Reg Parnell	(United Kingdom) Louis Klemantaski	Aston Martin Lagonda	Aston Martin DB3	11hr 32:43	
6th	**525**	**S2.0**	**(Italy) Emilio Giletti**	**(Italy) Guerino Bertocchi**		**Maserati A6GCS/53 Fantuzzi**	**11hr 38:42**	
7th	546	S+2.0	(Italy) Enrico Anselmi	(Italy) Luigi Maggio	Scuderia Lancia	Lancia Aurelia B20	11hr 41:07	
8th	616	S+2.0	(Italy) Clemente Biondetti	(Italy) E. Barovero	Scuderia Lancia	Lancia D20 Pinin Farina	11hr 49:49	
9th	633	S+2.0	(Italy) Giulio Cabianca	(Italy) Gianfranco Roghi		Ferrari 250 MM Vignale	11hr 51:39	
10th	512	S2.0	(Italy) Sergio Mantovani	(Italy) R Palazzi		Maserati A6GCS/53 Fantuzzi	11hr 51:56	
11th	541	S+2.0	(Italy) Roberto Piodi	(Italy) B. Militello		Lancia Aurelia B20	12hr 01:39	
12th	**340**	**S1.1**	**(Italy) Bruno Venezian**	**(Italy) Achille Albarelli**		**O.S.C.A. MT4 1100**	**12hr 04:50**	
13th	518	S2.0	(Italy) Salvatore Casella	(Italy) Vinicio Puccini	Franco Bordoni	Gordini T15S	12hr 05:39	
14th	504	S2.0	(Italy) Franco Cortese	(Italy) P. Feroldi		Fiat 8V	12hr 09:19	
15th	446	S2.0	(Italy) Enrico Sterzi	(Italy) O. Rossi		Ferrari 166 MM Vignale	12hr 15:49	
16th	551	S+2.0	(United Kingdom) Peter Collins	(United Kingdom) Mike Keen	Aston Martin Lagonda	Aston Martin DB3	12hr 22:20	
17th	337	S1.1	(Italy) Gaetano Sani	(Italy) Adone Bianchi		O.S.C.A. MT4 1100	12hr 26:35	
18th	506	S2.0	(Italy) Franco Mosters	(Italy) G. Vitali		Fiat 8V	12hr 29:18	
19th	526	S2.0	(Italy) Salvatore Leto di Prioli	(Italy) Massimo Leto di Prioli		Fiat 8V Zagato	12hr 30:36	
20th	444	S2.0	(Italy) Ovidio Capelli	(Italy) Orlando Gerli		Fiat 8V	12hr 30:49	
21st	550	S+2.0	(Italy) Umberto Marzotto	(Italy) Gino Bronzoni	Scuderia Lancia	Lancia Aurelia B20	12hr 32:16	
22nd	**255**	**T2.0**	**(Italy) Luciano Pagliai**	**(Italy) Vasco Parducci**		**Alfa Romeo 1900 TI**	**12hr 34:05**	
23rd	457	S2.0	(Italy) Sante Montanari	(Italy) A. Bombardini		Fiat 8V	12hr 34:20	
24th	447	S2.0	(Italy) Luigi Piotti	(Italy) Bruno Franzoni		Ferrari 166 MM Vignale	12hr 36:21	
25th	230	T2.0	(Italy) Antonio Stagnoli	(Italy) Mario de Giuseppe		Alfa Romeo 1900 TI	12hr 37:33	
26th	358	S1.1	(Italy) Giuseppe Coriasco	(Italy) L. Gamerro		O.S.C.A. MT4 1100	12hr 37:53	
27th	249	T2.0	(Italy) Ugo Bormioli	(Italy) O. Marchiori		Alfa Romeo 1900 TI	12hr 40:46	
28th	252	T2.0	(Italy) Mario Pareschi	(Italy) Paolo Milanese		Alfa Romeo 1900 TI	12hr 46:49	
29th	237	T2.0	(Italy) Elio Zagato	(Italy) Franco Martinego		Alfa Romeo 1900	12hr 47:16	
30th	438	S2.0	(Germany) Hans Herrmann	(Germany) Erwin Bauer	Porsche KG	Porsche 356 1500 Super	12hr 47:37	
31st	222	T2.0	(Italy) Alberto Della Beffa	(Italy) Olga Della Beffa		Alfa Romeo 1900 TI	12hr 50:49	
41st	428	S2.0	(Switzerland) Heinz Schulthess	(Germany) Peter Kaiser		Porsche 356 1500 Super	13hr 09:25	
58th	**407**	**T+2.0**	**(Belgium) Paul Frère**	**(Belgium) André Milhoux**		**Chrysler Saratoga**	**13hr 38:03**	
78th	**2349**	**T1.3**	**(Italy) Guido Mancini**	**(Italy) Carlo Mancini**		**Fiat 1100/103**	**14hr 05:16**	
84th	**2221**	**S750**	**(France) R. Touzot**	**(France) A. Persillon**		**DB HBR Panhard**	**14hr 15:36**	
100th	425	S2.0	(United States) J. Brons	(United States) Melvin H. Stickney		Porsche 356	14hr 35:54	
141st	005	T1.3	(Italy) Roberto Lippi	(Italy) P. Ungarelli		Fiat 1100	15hr 04:35	
151st	2229	S750	(France) Jean Rédélé	(France) Louis Pons		Renault 4CV/1063	15hr 14:51	
170th	**82**	**T750**	**(Italy) Adriano Angelelli**	**(Italy) Mario Recchi**		**Renault 4CV**	15hr 46:12	
250th	2201	S750	(France) P. J. Darquier	(France) “Bargary”		Renault 4CV/1063	18hr 04:29	
DNF	603	S+2.0	(Germany) Karl Kling	(Germany) Hans Klenk	S. P. A. Alfa Romeo	Alfa Romeo 6C 3000 CM	5hr 38:38	Accident
DNF	609	S+2.0	(Italy) Giovanni Bracco	(Italy) Alfonso Rolfo	Ferrari Spa	Ferrari 250 MM Pinin Farina	5hr 50:20	Differential
DNF	619	S+2.0	(Italy) Umberto Maglioli	(Italy) “Carnio”	Scuderia Lancia	Lancia D20 Pinin Farina	5hr 58:30	DNF
DNF	511	S2.0	(Italy) Luigi Musso	(Italy) O. Donatelli	Officine Alfieri Maserati	Maserati A6GCS/53 Fantuzzi	6hr 08:45	Accident
DNF	617	S+2.0	(Italy) Gerino Gerini	(Italy) Luciano Donazzolo		Ferrari 212 Export	6hr 15:23	DNF
DNF	612	S+2.0	(United Kingdom) George Abecassis	(United Kingdom) Pat Griffith	Aston Martin Lagonda	Aston Martin DB3	6hr 18:28	Steering, Accident
DNF	322	T2.0	(Italy) Piero Palmieri	(Italy) Giorgio Pianta		Alfa Romeo 1900 TI	6hr 27:50	DNF
DNF	544	S+2.0	(Italy) Roberto Rossellini	(Italy) Aldo Tonti	Roberto Rossellini	Ferrari 250 MM Vignale	7hr 28:26	Differential
DNF	532	S2.0	(Italy) Goffredo Zehender	(Italy) A. de Giuseppe		Alfa Romeo 1900 C52	7hr 53:25	DNF
DNF	552	S+2.0	(United Kingdom) John Lockett	(United Kingdom) Mike Read		Austin-Healey 100	8hr 19:54	DNF
DNF	2241	S750	(Italy) Rinaldo Pravettoni	(Italy) Dioscoride Lanza		Moretti 750	9hr 21:54	DNF
DNF	2249	S750	(Italy) Ilario Bandini	(Italy) Giovanni Sintoni		Bandini-Crosley		DNF
DNF	2334	T1.3	(Italy) Alfonso Thiele	(Italy) Aldo Storzini		Fiat 1100/103		DNF
DNF	101	T1.3	(Italy) Nello Pagani	(Italy) “Albis”		Fiat 1100		DNF
DNF	141	T2.0	(Italy) Lamberto Dalla Costa	(Italy) “Velardi”		Fiat 1400		DNF
DNF	220	T2.0	(Italy) Piero Carini	(Italy) A. Artesiani		Alfa Romeo 1900 TI		DNF
DNF	318	T2.0	(Italy) Bruno Ruffo	(Italy) E. Mantegazza		Alfa Romeo 1900 TI		DNF
DNF	320	T2.0	(Argentina) Onofre Marimón	(Italy) Gianfranco Maroni		Alfa Romeo 1900 TI		DNF
DNF	527	S2.0	(Italy) Michelangelo Leonardi	(Italy) Roberto Vallone		Ferrari 166 MM/53		DNF
DNF	540	S+2.0	(United States) John Fitch	(United States) Raymond Willday	Nash Motors	Nash-Healey		Brakes
DNF	542	S+2.0	(United Kingdom) Stirling Moss	(United Kingdom) Mortimer Morris-Goodall	Jaguars Cars Ltd.	Jaguar C-Type		Rear Axle
DNF	555	S+2.0	(United Kingdom) Leslie Johnson	(United Kingdom) W. A. McKenzie	L. H. Johnson	Jaguar C-Type		Split fuel tank
DNF	556	S+2.0	(Belgium) Jacques Swaters	(Belgium) Charles de Tornaco	Ecurie Francorchamps	Ferrari 250 S Vignale		DNF
DNF	559	S+2.0	(Italy) Gino Valenzano	(Italy) “Margutti”		Lancia Aurelia B20		Ignition
DNF	601	S+2.0	(France) Luc Descollanges	(France) Pierre-Gilbert Ugnon		Jaguar C-Type		Fatal accident
DNF	607	S+2.0	(Italy) Franco Bordoni	(Italy) Cetti Serbelloni	Franco Bordoni	Gordini T15S		Engine
DNF	613	S+2.0	(Italy) Luigi Villoresi	(Italy) Piero Cassani	Ferrari Spa	Ferrari 340 MM Touring		Differential
DNF	615	S+2.0	(Italy) Giuseppe Farina	(Italy) Luigi Parenti	Ferrari Spa	Ferrari 340 MM Touring		Accident
DNF	618	S+2.0	(United Kingdom) Tommy Wisdom	(United Kingdom) Dave Halliwell	Aston Martin Lagonda	Aston Martin DB2		Rear Axle
DNF	624	S+2.0	(Belgium) Olivier Gendebien	(Belgium) Charles Fraikin		Jaguar XK120		DNF
DNF	625	S+2.0	(United Kingdom) Mike Hawthorn	(Italy) Azelio Cappi	Ferrari Spa	Ferrari 250 MM Vignale		Brakes
DNF	631	S+2.0	(Italy) Consalvo Sanesi	(Italy) Giuseppe Cagna	S. P. A. Alfa Romeo	Alfa Romeo 6C 3000 CM		Accident
DNF	635	S+2.0	(Italy) Piero Taruffi	(Italy) “Gobbetti”	Scuderia Lancia	Lancia D20 Pininfarina		Engine
DNF	636	S+2.0	(Italy) Piero Scotti	(Italy) Giulio Contini	Piero Scotti	Ferrari 250 MM Vignale		DNF
DNF	637	S+2.0	(Italy) Eugenio Castellotti	(Italy) Ivo Regosa		Ferrari 340 Mexico Vignale		Clutch
DNF	638	S+2.0	(United Kingdom) Tony Rolt	(United Kingdom) Len Hayden	Bill Cannell / Jaguar Cars Ltd.	Jaguar C-Type		Engine

=== Class Winners ===
Class	Winners		
Sport oltre 2000	547	Ferrari 340 MM Vignale	Marzotto / Crosara
Sports 2000	525	Maserati A6GCS/53 Fantuzzi	Giletti /Bertocchi
Sports 1100	340	Osca MT4 1100	Venezian / Albarelli
Sports 750	2221	DB HBR Panhard	Touzot / Persillon
Turismo internazionale +2000	407	Chrysler Saratoga	Frère / Milhoux
Turismo internazionale 2000	255	Alfa Romeo 1900 TI	Pagliai / Parducci
Turismo internazionale 1300	2349	Fiat 1100/103	Mancini / Mancini
Turismo internazionale 750	82	Renault 4CV	Angelelli / Recchi

== Standings after the race ==
Pos	Championship	Points
1	(Italy) Ferrari	9
2=	(United Kingdom) Aston Martin	8
2=	(United States) Cunningham	8
4	(Italy) Alfa Romeo	6
5=	(United Kingdom) Jaguar	4
5=	(Italy) Lancia	4

- Note: Only the top five positions are included in this set of standings.

Championship points were awarded for the first six places in each race in the order of 8-6-4-3-2-1. Manufacturers were only awarded points for their highest finishing car with no points awarded for positions filled by additional cars. Only the best 4 results out of the 7 races could be retained by each manufacturer. Points earned but not counted towards the championship totals are listed within brackets in the above table.

World Sportscar Championship
Previous race: 12 Hours of Sebring	1953 season	Next race: 24 Hours of Le Mans
