= Ferrari 250 Europa =

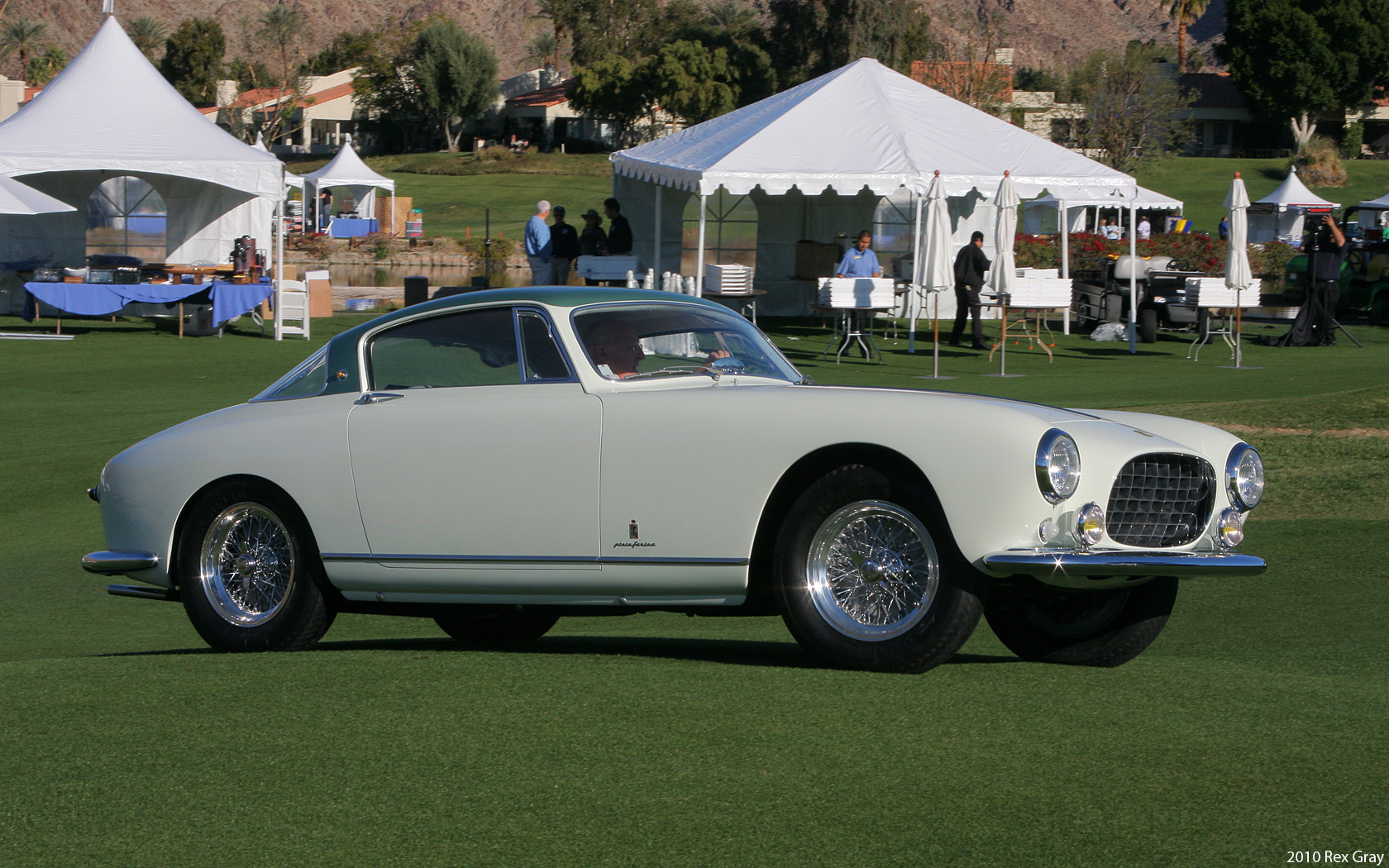

Overview
- Manufacturer: Ferrari
- Production: 1953; 22 produced
- Designer: Pinin Farina; Vignale

Powertrain
- Engine: 3.0 L (2963.45 cc) Tipo 103 Lampredi V12
- Power output: 200 hp
- Transmission: 4-speed

Chronology
- Predecessor: Ferrari 212 Inter
- Successor: Ferrari 250 Europa GT

The Ferrari 250 Europa is a grand tourer built by Ferrari to replace the Ferrari 212 Inter. While previous Ferrari models had models with multiple body styles depending on the coachbuilder (as Ferrari did not produce their own bodies), the 250 Europa had been preceded by an agreement between Ferrari and Pinin Farina to make Pinin Farina the official builder of Ferrari car bodies going forward. Out of the 22 cars produced, 18 were made with Pinin Farina bodies and 4 were made with Vignale bodies.

The car was revealed at the 1953 Paris Motor Show together with the Ferrari 375 America which shared the same chassis but used a larger engine.

== Chassis numbers ==
Chassis no.	Body style	Note	Paint
0295EU	Vignale Coupé	Fitted with a Colombo engine. Sold in 2024 for $4,295,000.	Wine Red/Black two-tone
0297EU	Pinin Farina Coupé	Fitted with a Colombo engine.	Dark Blue/White two-tone
0299EU	Pinin Farina Coupé		Red
0303EU	Pinin Farina Coupé		Artic Green
0305EU	Pinin Farina Coupé	Sold in 2014 for $2,750,000.	Red/White two-tone
0309EU	Pinin Farina Coupé		
0311EU	Pinin Farina Cabriolet		Silver
0313EU	Vignale Coupé	Sold in 2017 for €2,871,000.	Bruno Siena
0315AL	Pinin Farina Coupé	Converted to 375 America.	Dark Brown
0321EU	Pinin Farina Coupé		Dark Blue
0323EU	Pinin Farina Coupé		Dark Grey
0325EU	Pinin Farina Coupé	Fitted with a full aluminium body.	Silver
0331EU	Pinin Farina Coupé		Silver Blue
0333EU	Pinin Farina Coupé		Dark Green
0335EU	Pinin Farina Coupé		Blue
0341EU	Pinin Farina Coupé		Yellow
0343EU	Pinin Farina Coupé	Sold in 2013 for $1,017,500.	Green
0345EU	Pinin Farina Coupé		Red
0347EU	Vignale Coupé		
0349EU	Pinin Farina Coupé	Sold in 2010 for €450,000.	Silver
0351EU	Pinin Farina Coupé	Sold in 2023 for £1,518,750.	White
0353AL	Vignale Cabriolet	Converted to 375 America. Sold in 2022 for $7,595,000.	Black

== See also ==
- Ferrari 375 America
