= Ferrari Lampredi engine =

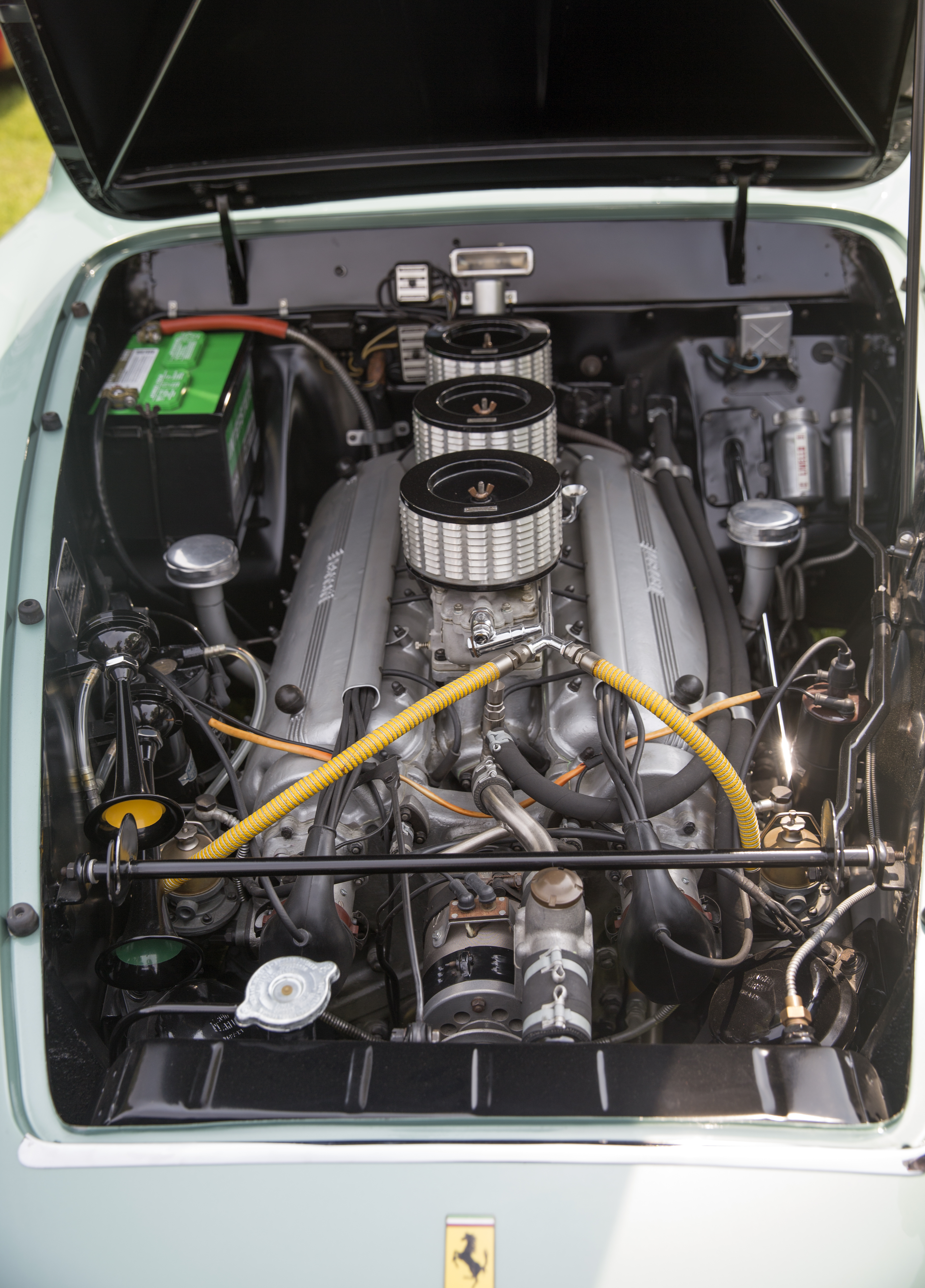
- Lampredi V12 in Ferrari 342 America

Overview
- Manufacturer: Ferrari
- Production: 1950–1959

Layout
- Configuration: DOHC, 8-valve, Inline-4, two-valves per cylinder; DOHC, 12-valve, Inline-6, two-valves per cylinder; SOHC, 24-valve, 60°, V12, two-valves per cylinder
- Displacement: 2.0–5.0 L (122.0–305.1 cu in)
- Cylinder bore: 68 mm (2.7 in) V12; 72 mm (2.8 in) V12; 79 mm (3.1 in) V12; 80 mm (3.1 in) V12; 84 mm (3.3 in) V12; 88 mm (3.5 in) V12; 90 mm (3.5 in) L4/L6; 93 mm (3.7 in) L4; 94 mm (3.7 in) L4/L6; 100 mm (3.9 in) L4; 102 mm (4.0 in) L4/L6; 103 mm (4.1 in) L4
- Piston stroke: 68 mm (2.7 in) V12; 74.5 mm (2.9 in) V12; 78 mm (3.1 in) L4/L6; 73.5 mm (2.9 in) L4; 90 mm (3.5 in) L4/L6; 79.5 mm (3.1 in) L4; 105 mm (4.1 in) L4
- Cylinder block material: Aluminium
- Cylinder head material: Aluminium

Combustion
- Fuel system: Weber carburetor
- Fuel type: Petrol
- Oil system: Wet sump Dry sump
- Cooling system: Water-cooled

Output
- Power output: 121–279 kW (165–379 PS; 162–374 hp)
- Torque output: 170–270 lb⋅ft (230–366 N⋅m)

Chronology
- Predecessor: Ferrari Colombo engine
- Successor: Ferrari Jano engine Ferrari Dino engine

The Ferrari Lampredi engine was a naturally aspirated all aluminum 60° V12 engine produced between 1950 and 1959. Inline-4 and Inline-6 variants for racing were derived from it.

Aurelio Lampredi designed a number of racing engines for Ferrari. He was brought on to hedge the company's bets with a different engine family than the small V12s designed by Gioacchino Colombo. Variants of his design powered the company to a string of world championships in the 1950s. All were quickly abandoned due to changing engine displacement sizes (because, starting in 1958, the sports regulations required sport cars to have engines within 3 litres), with the Dino V6 and V8 taking the place of the fours and sixes and evolution of the older Colombo V12 continuing as the company's preeminent V12.

== V12 ==
=== 275 ===
After little luck in Formula One with the supercharged Colombo V12, Ferrari returned to natural aspiration. The task of creating the new V12 for Formula One use fell to Aurelio Lampredi, who designed a 3.3 L (3322 cc) unit, with bore centres at 108 mm apart, for 275 S and 275 F1. The SOHC, 2-valve engine debuted in 275 S, as a test bed, with three Weber 40DCF carburettors, developing 270 PS (199 kW; 266 hp) and was soon upgraded with 42DCF Webers for 300 PS (221 kW; 296 hp) for F1.

Applications:

- 72 by 68 mm (2.8 by 2.7 in) of (3322.35 cc)
  - 1950 Ferrari 275 S
  - 1950 Ferrari 275 F1

=== 340 ===
Being unable to match Alfetta 158 performance, Lampredi upgraded the design to 4.1 L (4101 cc) for 340 F1. Power output grew to 335 PS (246 kW; 330 hp) but the single-seater was used in non-championship race only and very soon replaced by even bigger engined Ferrari. Like the Colombos, Lampredis engines found their way into road cars as well. The 1950 340 America and later 340 Mexico/MM were first with big 4.1 L (4101 cc) engines producing 220–280 PS (162–206 kW; 217–276 hp). All GT road cars used wet sumps, apart for dry-sumped 340 America having engine based directly on the 340 F1.

Applications:

- 80 by 68 mm (3.1 by 2.7 in) of (4101.67 cc)
  - 1950 Ferrari 340 F1
  - 1950 Ferrari 340 America
  - 1951 Ferrari 342 America
  - 1952 Ferrari 340 Mexico
  - 1953 Ferrari 340 MM

=== 375 ===
In the same year as 340 F1, the last Lampredi-designed F1 engine was inaugurated. Now at 4.5 L (4493 cc) and 350 PS (257 kW; 345 hp) installed in 375 F1, Ferrari was finally able to beat Alfa Romeo, in the British Grand Prix at Silverstone. For the 1952 season Ferrari modified the 375 F1 for the Indianapolis 500 race. The bore was reduced by 1 mm (to 79 mm) for a total displacement below 4.4 L (4382 cc). New Weber 40IF4C carburettors improved power output to impressive 380 PS (279 kW; 375 hp). All Formula One Lampredi V12s used dry sump lubrication. This engine family remained the only Ferrari V12 never upgraded to a four-cam configuration. In 1953 Lampredi V12 powering customers 375 MM had displacement enlarged to 4.5 L (4522 cc) and power grew to 340 PS (250 kW; 335 hp). Its detuned version also powered the 375 America. Factory 375 MMs received different engines straight from Formula One, displacing 4493 cc.

Applications:

- 80 by 74.5 mm (3.1 by 2.9 in) of (4493.74 cc)
  - 1950 Ferrari 375 F1
  - 1953 Ferrari 375 MM
- 79 by 74.5 mm (3.1 by 2.9 in) of (4382.1 cc)
  - 1952 Ferrari 375 Indianapolis
- 84 by 68 mm (3.3 by 2.7 in) of (4522 cc)
  - 1953 Ferrari 375 MM
  - 1953 Ferrari 375 America

=== 250 ===
Lampredi engines moved to the 250 with the 1953 250 Europa. Unlike the earlier engines with their oversquare 80 mm (3.1 in) by 68 mm (2.7 in) bore and stroke, the 250 used square (Bore 68 mm (2.7 in) X Stroke 68 mm (2.7 in)) dimensions for 3.0 L (2963 cc) total. Power output was 200 PS (147 kW; 197 hp) at 6300 rpm.

Applications:

- 68 by 68 mm (2.7 by 2.7 in) of (2963.46 cc)
  - 1953 250 Europa

=== 375 Plus & 410 ===
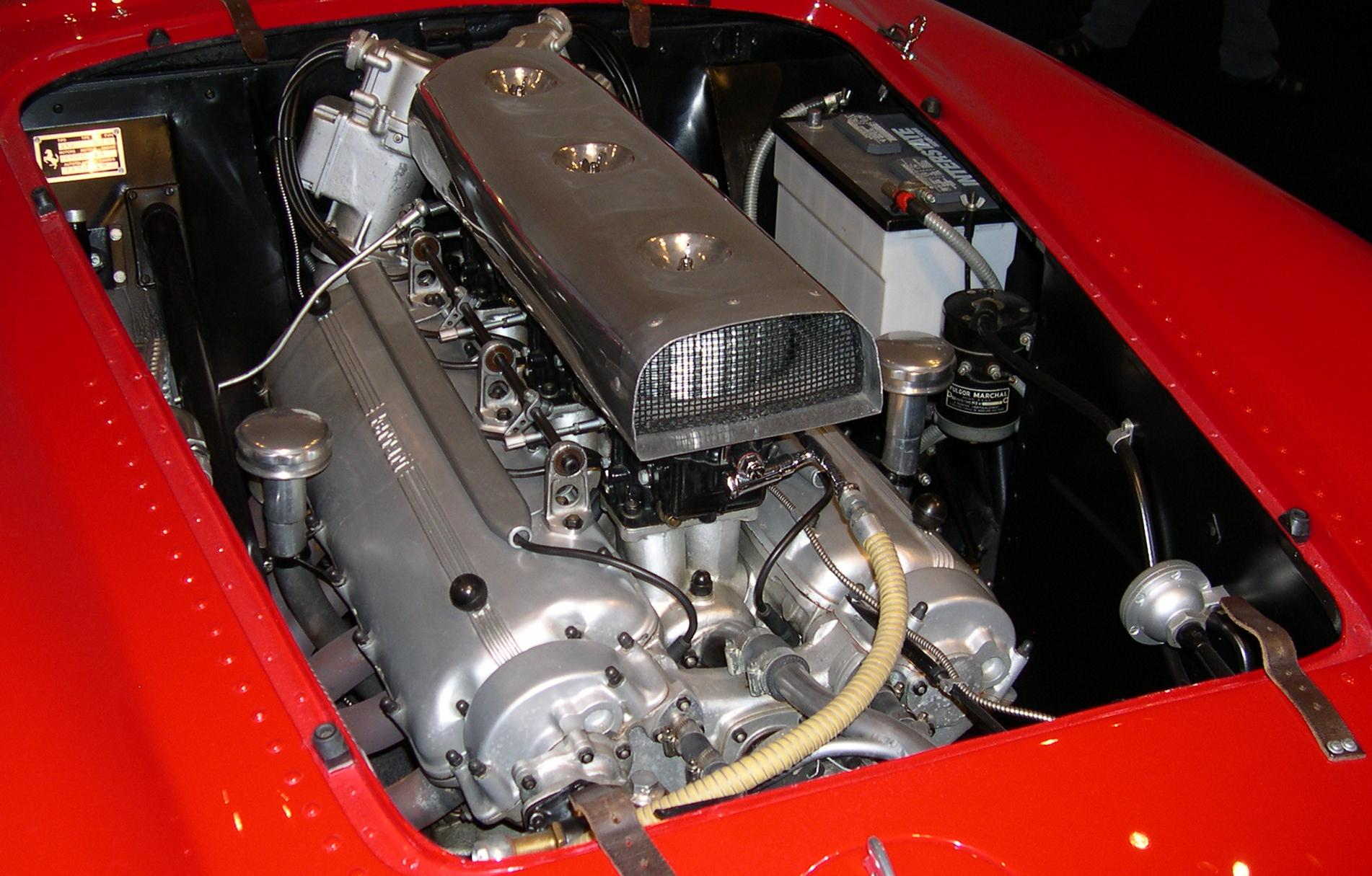
A 5.0-litre Lampredi V12 in Ferrari 375 Plus

The penultimate displacement evolution came in 1954 with 375 Plus. This almost 5 L (4954 cc) engine shared its stroke with 375 F1 powerplant at 74.5 mm and developed 330 PS (243 kW; 325 hp) at 6000 rpm. This improvement helped score victories at Le Mans and Carrera Panamericana that year. Apart for later 375 Plus and 410 S, all early Sport V12s used wet sump lubrication. All Lampredi V12 engines had a stroke of 68 mm, except for 375 F1 and an enlarged 375 Plus engines. The big America engine was made even larger for the 1955 410 Superamerica. Now with an 88 mm (3.5 in) bore and standard 68 mm stroke, it displaced 5 L (4962 cc) and produced 340–360 PS (250–265 kW; 335–355 hp) depending on carburettors setup. The same engine powered the last Lampredi V12-engined sports racing car, the 410 S, with some upgraded to four coils and twin plugs per cylinder for a maximum output of 380 PS (279 kW; 375 hp).

Applications:

- 84 by 74.5 mm (3.3 by 2.9 in) of (4954.35 cc)
  - 1954 Ferrari 375 Plus
- 88 by 68 mm (3.5 by 2.7 in) of (4962 cc)
  - 1955 Ferrari 410 S
  - 1955 Ferrari 410 Superamerica

== I4 ==
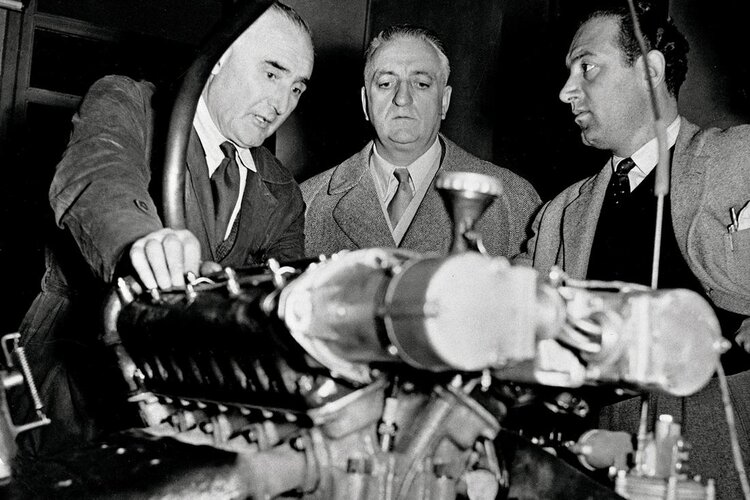
Aurelio Lampredi (right), Enzo Ferrari (center) and Luigi Bazzi (left) next to a Lampredi inline-4

Lampredi designed an inline-4 engine for Formula Two use. This was later adopted for Formula One and sports car racing cars through the 1950s. The original 2.0 L engine of 1951 would prove to be the longest-lived, continuing through 1957 in various cars. All Lampredi inline-4 engines used dry sump lubrication.

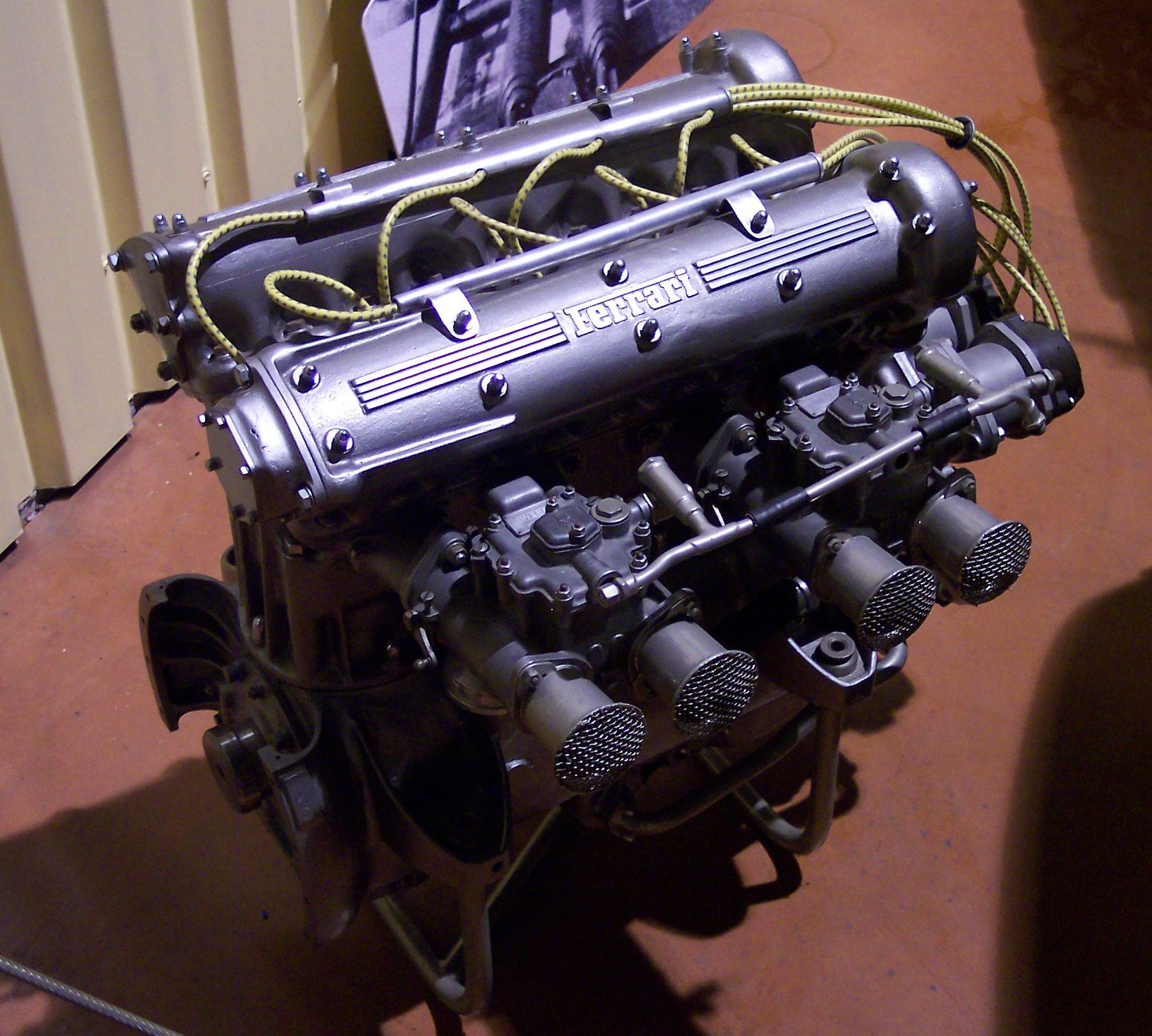
Ferrari Lampredi four-cylinder engine

=== 500 ===
The initial engine was a 2.0 L (1,984.86 cc) unit with a 90 mm (3.5 in) bore and 78 mm (3.1 in) stroke. This engine was the second designed four-cylinder unit that Ferrari used in racing, appearing in 1951 in the Ferrari 500 F2 entrant in Formula Two. The aluminium engine produced 165 PS (121 kW; 163 hp) with two Weber 45DOE carburettors, with power growing in 1953 to 185 PS (136 kW; 182 hp) with two 50DCO carburettors. Its first outing was an Italian GP on 23 September 1951, won by Alberto Ascari.

An entirely different 2.0 L four-cylinder appeared in 1953 in the 553 F2. This time, bore was 93 mm (3.7 in) and stroke was 73.5 mm (2.9 in) (2.9 in) for a total of 1,997.12 cc. Two Weber 50DCOA3 carbs produced 180 PS (132 kW; 178 hp).

The original 1951 Formula Two, 2.0 L (1985 cc), engine was resurrected for the World Sportscar Championship in 1953 and the 500 Mondial. With lower compression and two Weber 45DCOA/3 carburettors, it produced 170 PS (125 kW; 168 hp). The same engine, now at 180 PS (132 kW; 178 hp), was used in the famous 500 TR. The "red head" cylinder head lent its name to the car, the first Testa Rossa. Another TR with this engine, the 1957 500 TRC, was produced to comply with new regulations from C-section of the International Sporting Code. This model was only raced by customers.

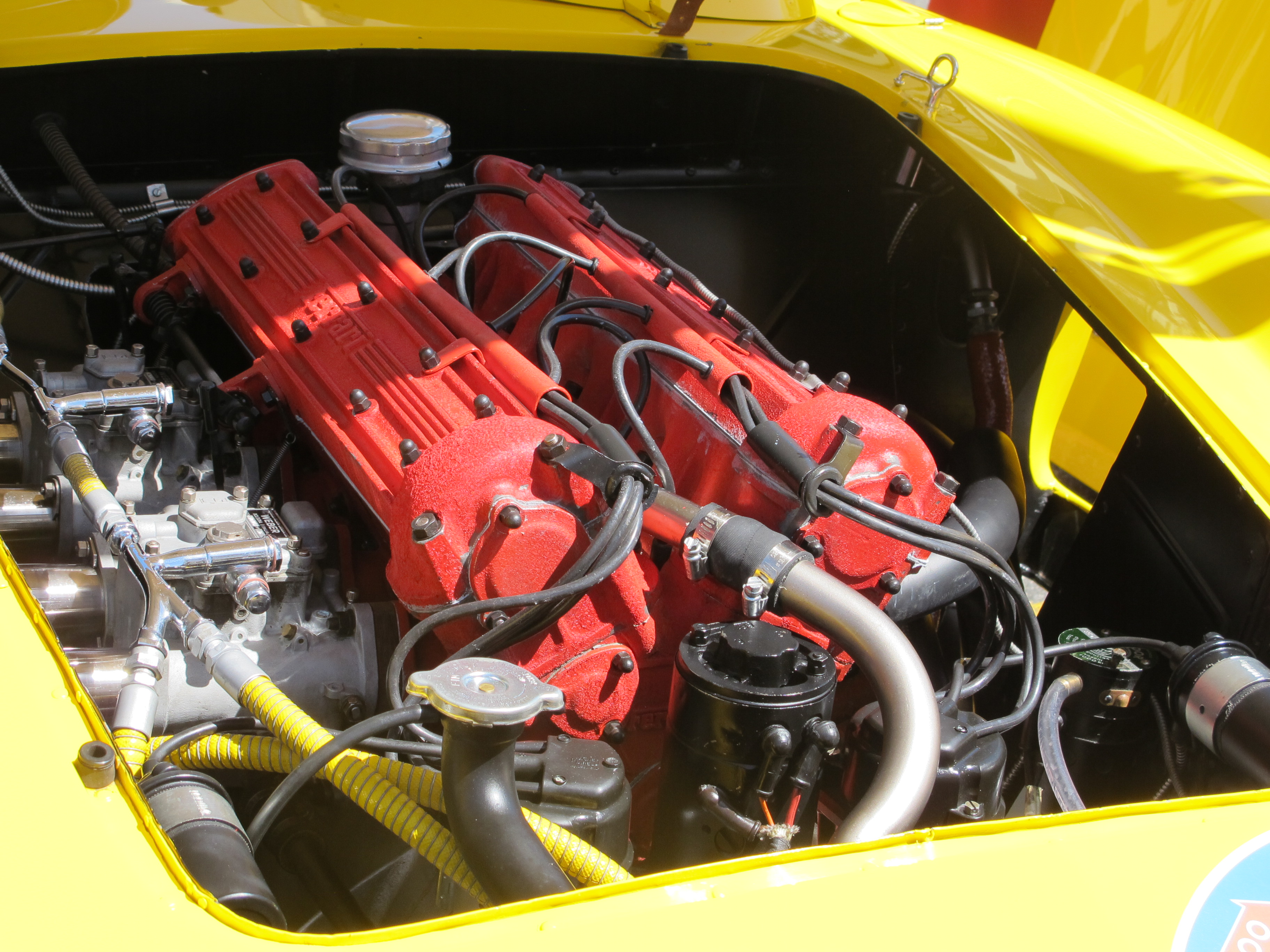
Red head Lampredi engine in 1956 Ferrari 500 TR

Applications:

- 90 by 78 mm (3.5 by 3.1 in) 496.215 cc per cylinder (1984.86 cc)
  - 1951–1953 Ferrari 500 F2
  - 1953 Ferrari 500 Mondial
  - 1956 Ferrari 500 TR
  - 1957 Ferrari 500 TRC
- 93 by 73.5 mm (3.7 by 2.9 in) 499.28 cc per cylinder (1997.12 cc)
  - 1953 Ferrari 553 F2

=== 625 ===
Ferrari 625 F1 was the first Formula One Ferrari car with an inline-4 engine. 94 mm (3.7 in) by 90 mm (3.5 in) dimensions were selected, for a total displacement of 2.5 L (2498.32 cc). Output was 210–230 PS (154–169 kW; 207–227 hp). However, the car was not selected for competition at the start, with the lower cylinder capacity 500 F2 being chosen. The F1 was first tested on 2 September 1951 in Bari.

The 625 F1 car was reworked in late 1953 to become Ferrari's 1954 entrant as 553 F1. The engine was bored and stroked to 100 mm (3.9 in) by 79.5 mm (3.1 in) for a similar 2,497.56 cc of displacement. The F1 car, with 12:1 to 13:1 compression and two Weber 50DCOA/3 carburettors, pumped 260 PS (191 kW; 256 hp) from this powerplant. The oversquare engine reappeared again in the 1955 555 F1 with exactly the same specifications.

The first application of Lampredi's four-cylinder engine outside Formula One and Formula Two was this same 2.5 L (2,498.32 cc) unit in the 1953 625 TF. The aluminium engine produced 220 PS (162 kW; 217 hp) with 2 Weber 50DCO4 carburettors. Although marked as TF the car never raced in Targa Florio. After the Le Mans disaster, the 2.5 L I4 was resurrected for the 1956 625 LM car. With different carburettors setup, two Weber 42DCOA/3, output remained the same at 220 PS, which was enough for a third place at Le Mans.

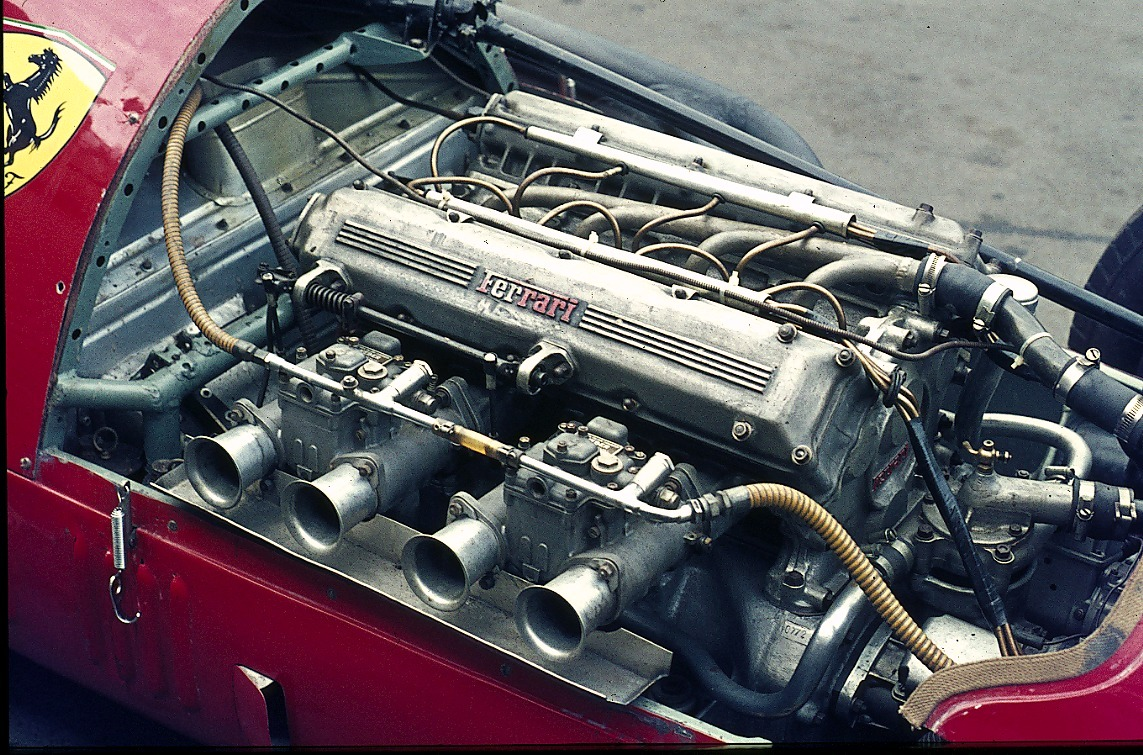
Ferrari 553 "Squalo", 2.5-litre engine

Applications:

- 100 by 79.5 mm (3.9 by 3.1 in) 624.39 cc per cylinder (2497.56 cc)
  - 1954 Ferrari 553 F1
  - 1955 Ferrari 555 F1
- 94 by 90 mm (3.7 by 3.5 in) 624.58 cc per cylinder (2498.32 cc)
  - 1951 Ferrari 625 F1
  - 1953 Ferrari 625 TF
  - 1956 Ferrari 625 LM
  - 1957 Ferrari 625 TRC

=== 735 ===
A big-bore version was also produced and implemented in 1953 735 S. Displacement was now 2.9 L (2941.66 cc) with 102 mm (4 in) of bore, though the 90 mm (3.5 in) stroke was retained. Output nudged up to 225 PS (165 kW; 222 hp) with two Weber 50DCOA carburettors.

Applications:

- 102 by 90 mm (4.0 by 3.5 in) 735.41 cc per cylinder (2941.66 cc)
  - 1953 735 S

=== 750 ===
For the 1954 the bore of the Lampredi I4 was nudged up to 103 mm (4.1 in) for the 3.0 L (2999.62 cc) unit used in the 750 Monza. Engine was a development of a Type 555 I4. Dual Weber 58DCOA/3 carburettors pushed out 260 PS (191 kW; 256 hp).

Applications:

- 103 by 90 mm (4.1 by 3.5 in) 749.9 cc per cylinder (2999.62 cc)
  - 1954 750 Monza

=== 857 & 860 ===
For 1955, the Type 129 engine debuted in the 857 S. Bore was the same 102 mm (4.0 in) as the Type 735, but stroke was now 105 mm (4.1 in) for a total of 3.4 L (3432 cc). At the 1955 Targa Florio, the 857 S came third overall, driven by Eugenio Castellotti. Same engine type as in 857 S, was later used in the 1956 860 Monza with two Weber 58DCOA/3 carburettors and 280 PS (206 kW; 276 hp). These cars placed first and second at Sebring and came second and third at Mille Miglia that year.

Applications:

- 102 by 105 mm (4.0 by 4.1 in) 858 cc per cylinder (3432 cc)
  - 1955 Ferrari 857 S
  - 1956 Ferrari 860 Monza

== I6 ==
=== 306 S ===
In 1954 Ferrari produced its first inline-6 engine. Aurelio Lampredi designed a prototype Tipo 114 2,977.28 cc (3.0 L; 181.7 cu in) engine for the experimental 306 S sports car that never raced. The internal measurements were identical to the 500 Mondial engine.

Applications:

- 90 by 78 mm (3.5 by 3.1 in) 496.215 cc per cylinder (2977.28 cc)

=== 376 S ===
A bigger Tipo 118 3,747.48 cc (3.7 L; 228.7 cu in) version was installed in the short-lived 376 S sports car (also known as 118 LM) converted from 306 S chassis in 1955. It used the same 94 mm (3.7 in) bore and 90 mm (3.5 in) stroke and as the original Lampredi 625 F1 inline-4 engine, it was extrapolated from, and produced 280 PS (206 kW; 276 hp) at 6200 rpm with three Weber 58DCOA/3 carburettors.

Applications:

- 94 by 90 mm (3.7 by 3.5 in) 624.58 cc per cylinder (3747.48 cc)
  - 1955 376 S

=== 735 LM ===
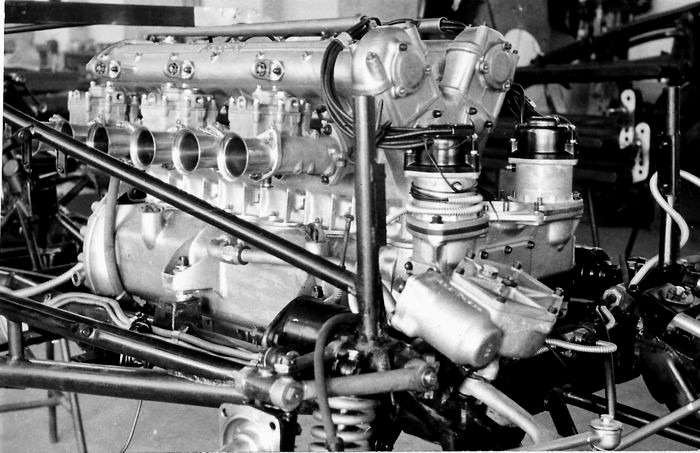
Lampredi Tipo 121 I6 engine

Later same year 735 LM (also known as 121 LM or 446 S) was created, intended for 1955 Le Mans, this time named from its unitary displacement, the same as on the 735 S engine from which its dimensions were drawn. Lampredi modified the bore of the 376 S with 102 mm (4.0 in) for the 735 LM Tipo 121 engine. Displacement was 4,412.49 cc (4.4 L; 269.3 cu in). Triple Weber 50DCOA/3 carburettors pushed power up to 330 PS (243 kW; 325 hp) at 5800 rpm. With this power, the 735 LM could hit 282 km/h (175 mph) on the Mulsanne Straight at Le Mans. Both engines used dry sump lubrication.

Applications:

- 102 by 90 mm (4.0 by 3.5 in) 735.41 cc per cylinder (4412.5 cc)
  - 1955 735 LM

== I2 prototype ==
Enzo Ferrari and Aurelio Lampredi were interested in creating extremely reliable engines for racing use. In 1955, after seeing the success of Lampredi's Inline-4 engines, the pair considered an Inline-two engine for the slowest, twisty racing courses. Lampredi built a prototype tipo 116 with 4 valves per cylinder and 2.5 L (2493 cc) of displacement. Bore and stroke were unusual 118 by 114 mm (4.6 by 4.5 in). Project was codenamed 252 F1, as per naming convention. The engine produced 175 PS (129 kW; 173 hp) at 4800 rpm on the test bench, but broke the crankshaft due to poor balance. The project was abandoned shortly after in favor of more-conventional I4 engines.

== See also ==
- List of Ferrari engines
