= Ferrari 375 F1 =

1950 Formula One racing car by Ferrari

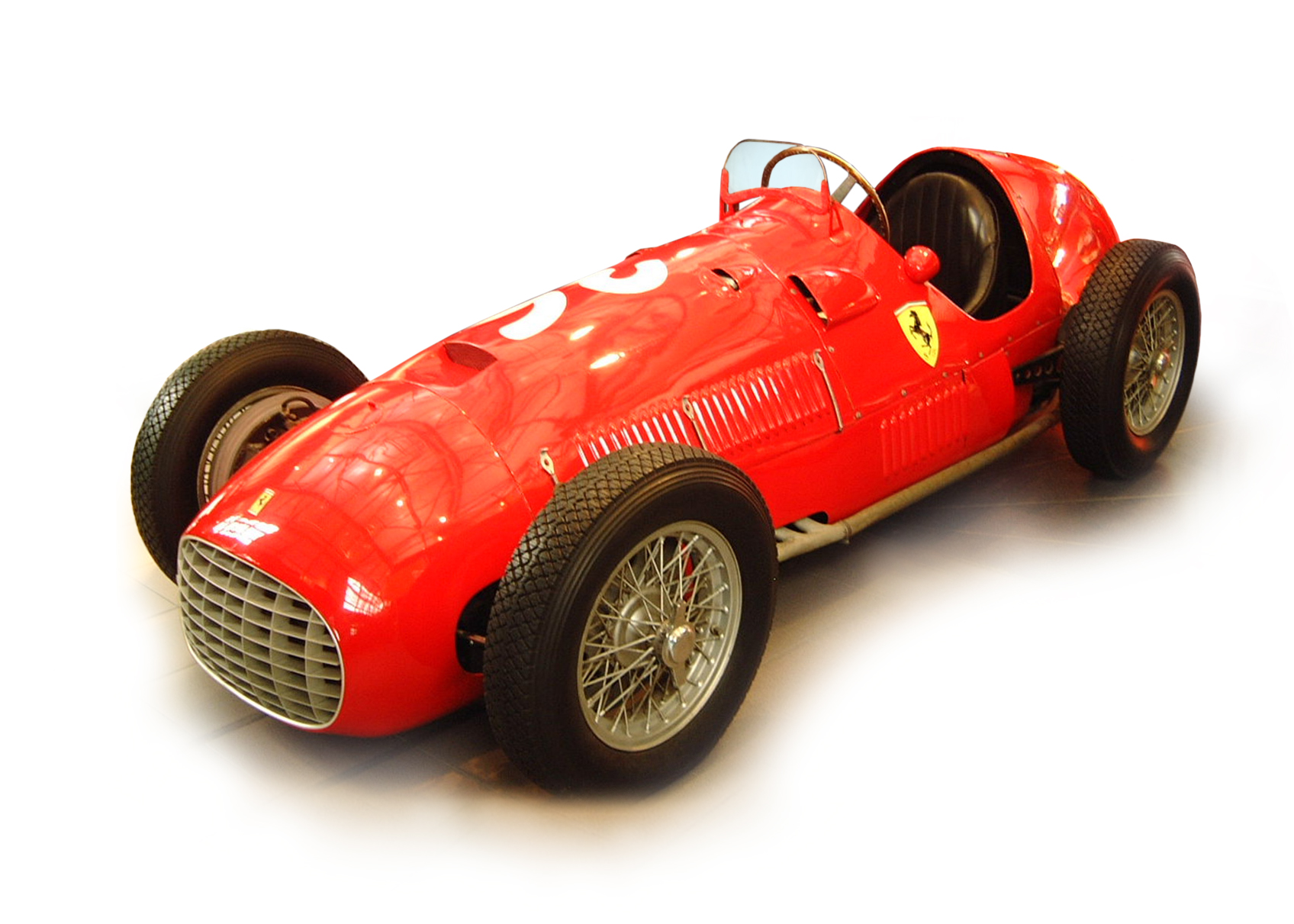
- Category: Formula One
- Constructor: Ferrari
- Designer: Aurelio Lampredi
- Predecessor: 125
- Successor: 212

Technical specifications
- Chassis: Single-seater, tubular frame
- Wheelbase: 2,320 mm (91 in); 2,420 mm (95 in)
- Engine: 3.3 L Lampredi V12, naturally aspirated, front engine, longitudinally mounted 4.1 L Lampredi V12, naturally aspirated, front engine, longitudinally mounted 4.5 L Lampredi V12, naturally aspirated, front engine, longitudinally mounted
- Transmission: Ferrari 4-speed manual
- Weight: 560 kg (1,230 lb)
- Fuel: Shell
- Tyres: Pirelli; Firestone

Competition history
- Notable entrants: Scuderia Ferrari
- Debut: 1950 Belgian Grand Prix
Races	Wins	Podiums	Poles	F/Laps
10	3	13	3	0
- Constructors' Championships: 0
- Drivers' Championships: 0
- Unless otherwise stated, all data refer to Formula One World Championship Grands Prix only.

The Ferrari 375 F1 is a Ferrari Formula One car.

After finding only modest success with the supercharged 125 F1 car in Formula One, Ferrari decided to switch for 1950 to the naturally aspirated 4.5-litre formula for the series. Calling in Aurelio Lampredi to replace Gioacchino Colombo as technical director, Enzo Ferrari directed that the company work in stages to grow and develop an entirely new large-displacement V12 engine for racing.

The first outcome of Lampredi's work was the experimental 275 S. Just two of these racing barchettas were built, based on the 166 MM but using the experimental 3.3-litre V12. These were raced at the Mille Miglia of 1950 on April 23. Although one car held the overall lead for a time, both were forced to retire with mechanical failure before the end.

The 275 F1 made its debut at the Grand Prix of Belgium on June 18, sporting the same 3.3-litre (3322 cc/202 in³) version of Lampredi's new engine. With three Weber 42DCF carburetors, a single overhead camshaft for each bank of cylinders, and two valves per cylinder, the engine produced a capable 300 hp (224 kW) at 7200 rpm. Alberto Ascari drove the car to fifth place, marking the end of the 3.3-litre engine.

The 275 was replaced at the Grand Prix of Nations at Geneva on July 30, 1950 by the 340 F1. As the name suggests, the car sported a larger 4.1-litre (4101.66 cc/250 in³) version of Lampredi's V12. Other changes included a new de Dion tube rear suspension based on that in the 166 F2 car and four-speed gearbox. It had a longer 2,420 mm (95 in) wheelbase, but other dimensions remained the same. With 335 hp (250 kW), Ascari was able to keep up with the Alfa Romeo 158 of Juan Manuel Fangio but retired with engine trouble. Although the 340 proved itself capable, it was only the middle step in Ferrari's 1950 car development.

Ferrari achieved the 4.5-litre goal of the formula with the 375 F1, two of which debuted at Monza on September 3, 1950. This 4.5-litre (4493.73 cc/274 in³) engine produced roughly the same power as its 4.1-litre predecessor, but its tractability earned Ascari second place in that debut race. A series of modifications through the 1951 season allowed Ferrari to finally put Alfa Romeo behind it in a Formula One race, with José Froilán González' victory at Silverstone on July 14 becoming the constructor's first World Championship win. Ascari's wins at the Nürburgring and Monza and strong finishes throughout the season cemented the company's position as a Formula One contender.

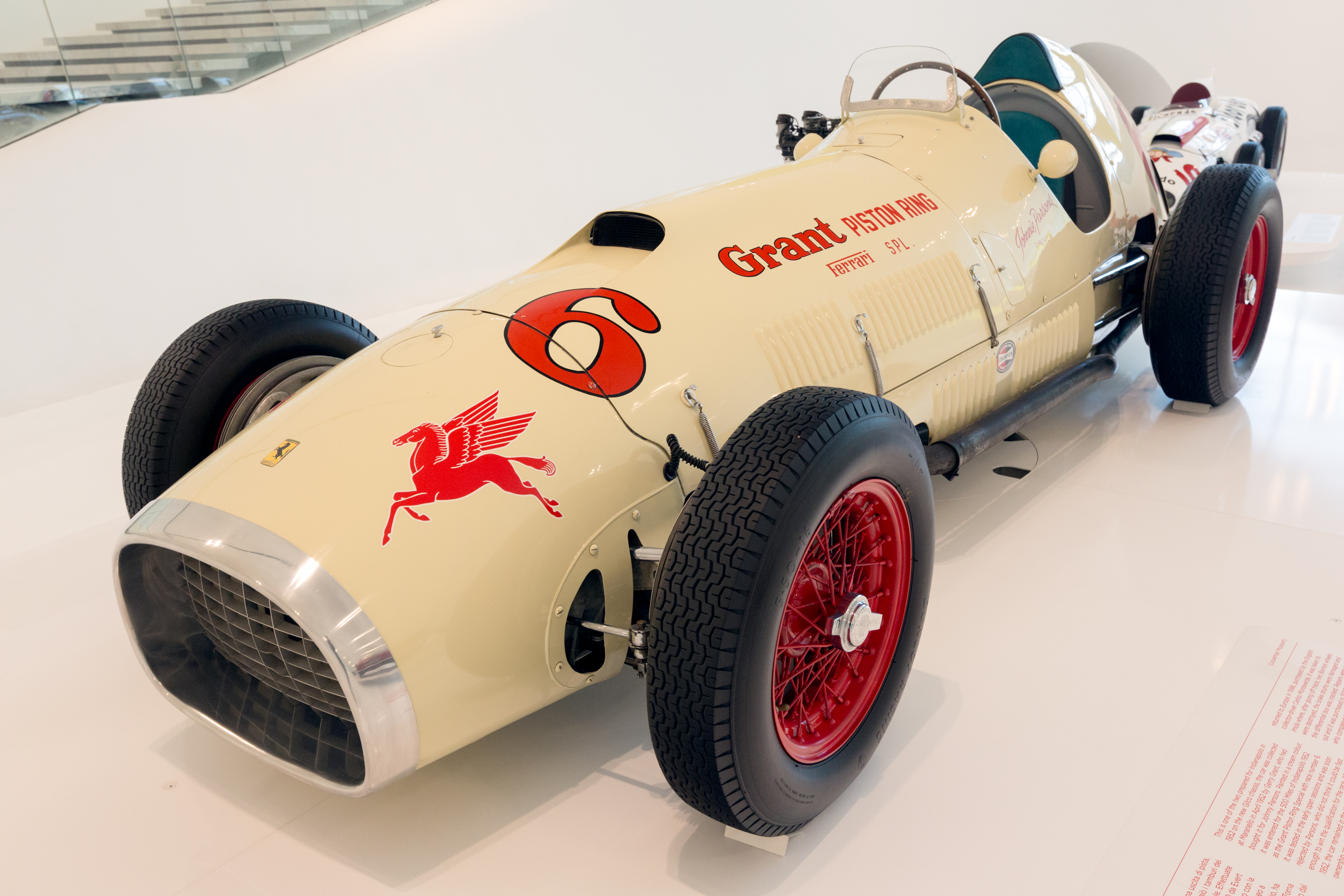
Johnnie Parsons intended to drive this Ferrari 375 Indianapolis in the 1952 Indianapolis 500 - he later elected to race the Kurtis Kraft in which he had driven the 1949 and 1950 events

Changes in the Formula One regulations led the company to shift the big engine to an Indy car, the 1952 375 Indianapolis. Three new Weber 40IF4C carburettors brought power output to 380 hp (279 kW), the wheelbase was lengthened, and the chassis and suspension were strengthened. Although the car performed well in European testing, it was not able to meet the American challenge, with just one of four 375s even qualifying for the 1952 Indianapolis 500. Ascari was the driver who did qualify the car for the race, starting 25th (out of 33 starters) with a qualifying speed of 134.3 mp/h (the pole was won by American Chet Miller who pushed his supercharged Kurtis Kraft-Novi to 139.03 mp/h). Ascari would be classified in 31st place, completing only 40 of the 200 laps before being forced to retire with wheel failure, though he would go on to win the remaining six Grands Prix of the season to easily win his first World Championship from Ferrari teammate Giuseppe Farina.

The big V12 was scrapped for 1954, as Formula One required a 2.5-litre engine. The new 553 F1 adopted Lampredi's four cylinder engine, leaving the V12 for sports car use.

The 375 was driven during the 2011 British Grand Prix weekend by then-current Ferrari driver Fernando Alonso as a tribute to the sixtieth anniversary of the Ferrari's first World Championship Grand Prix win at the 1951 British Grand Prix at Silverstone, with Argentinean driver José Froilán González driving at the time.

== Technical data ==
Technical data	275 F1	340 F1	375 F1	375 Indy
Engine:	Front mounted 60° 12 cylinder V engine
displacement:	3322 cm³	4102 cm³	4493 cm³	4382 cm³
Bore x stroke:	72 x 68 mm	80 x 68 mm	80 x 74.5 mm	79 x 74.5 mm
Compression:	10.0:1	12.0:1	11.0:1	13.0:1
Max power at rpm:	300 hp at 7 300 rpm	335 hp at 7 000 rpm	350 hp at 7 000 rpm	380 hp at 7 500 rpm
Valve control:	One overhead camshaft per cylinder bank, 2 valves per cylinder
Carburetor:	3 Weber 42 DCF			3 Weber 40 IF4C
Gearbox:	4-speed manual, transaxle
suspension front:	Double cross links, transverse leaf spring
suspension rear:	De Dion axle, double longitudinal links, transverse leaf spring
Brakes:	Hydraulic drum brakes
Chassis & body:	Oval tube frame with aluminum body
wheelbase:	232 cm			254 cm
Dry weight:	850 kg			785 kg
Top speed:	280 km/h	300 km/h	320 km/h	330 km/h

== Complete Formula One World Championship results ==
(key) (results in bold indicate pole position, results in italics indicate fastest lap)

Year	Entrant	Chassis	Engine	Tyres	Drivers	1	2	3	4	5	6	7	8
1950	Scuderia Ferrari	Ferrari 275	Ferrari 3.3 V12	P		GBR	MON	500	SUI	BEL	FRA	ITA	
1950	Scuderia Ferrari	Ferrari 275	Ferrari 3.3 V12	P	Alberto Ascari					5			
1950	Scuderia Ferrari	Ferrari 375	Ferrari 4.5 V12	P	Alberto Ascari							Ret/2†	
1950	Scuderia Ferrari	Ferrari 375	Ferrari 4.5 V12	P	Dorino Serafini							2†	
1951	Scuderia Ferrari	Ferrari 375	Ferrari 4.5 V12	P		SUI	500	BEL	FRA	GBR	GER	ITA	ESP
1951	Scuderia Ferrari	Ferrari 375	Ferrari 4.5 V12	P	Luigi Villoresi	Ret		3	3	3	4	4	Ret
1951	Scuderia Ferrari	Ferrari 375	Ferrari 4.5 V12	P	Alberto Ascari	6		2	Ret/2†	Ret	**1**	1	**4**
1951	Scuderia Ferrari	Ferrari 375	Ferrari 4.5 V12	P	Piero Taruffi	2		Ret			5	5	Ret
1951	Scuderia Ferrari	Ferrari 375	Ferrari 4.5 V12	P	José Froilán González				2†	**1**	3	2	2
1951	Scuderia Ferrari	Ferrari 375	Ferrari 4.5 V12	P	Chico Landi							Ret	
1952	Scuderia Ferrari	Ferrari 375 Indy	Ferrari 4.5 V12	F		SUI	500	BEL	FRA	GBR	GER	NED	ITA
1952	Scuderia Ferrari	Ferrari 375 Indy	Ferrari 4.5 V12	F	Alberto Ascari		Ret						

- † denotes a shared drive.
