= Aurelio Lampredi =

Italian engineer

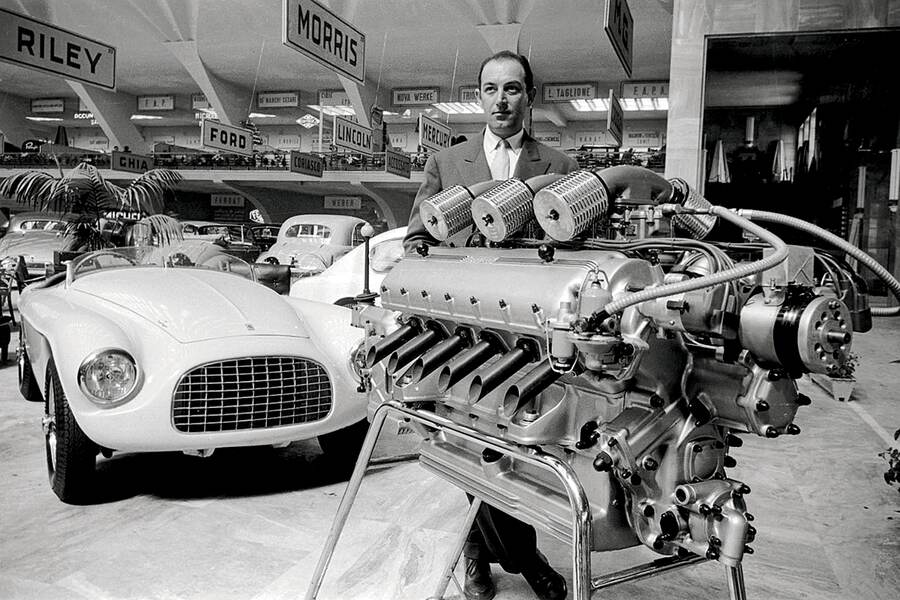
Aurelio Lampredi and his V12 engine at the 1951 Torino Motor Show

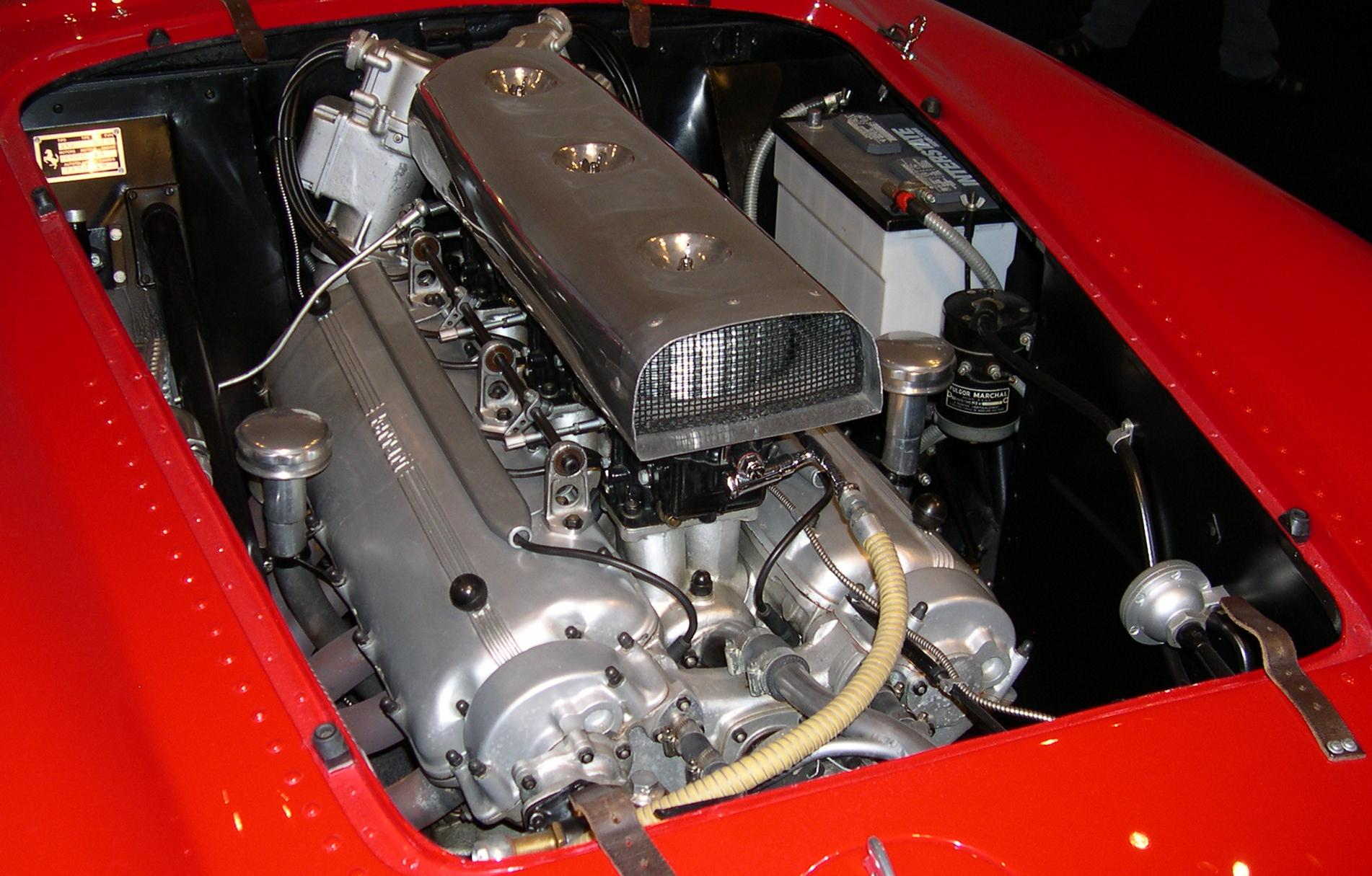
1954 Ferrari 375 Plus V12 engine

Aurelio Lampredi (16 June 1917 – 1 June 1989) was an Italian automobile and aircraft engine designer.

== Early career ==
Lampredi was born in Livorno, Tuscany. He studied mechanical engineering at the Institut Technique Supérieur in Fribourg. A classical music lover, he had wanted to study piano but was persuaded by his father to choose a more secure career path. After a brief apprentice at the Livorno Shipyard, he started working at Piaggio in 1937, where he was supervised by Corradino D'Ascanio. At the outbreak of World War II, he was drafted and moved to Reggiane, where he designed military aircraft engines.

== Ferrari ==
Reggiane's chief designer Carlo Ruini was impressed with Lampredi's work and recommended him to Enzo Ferrari, who at the time was in the process of building his own racing team. Lampredi's first interlude with Ferrari only lasted one year as he didn't feel there was enough space for professional growth with Giuseppe Busso and Gioacchino Colombo already covering senior positions. He moved to Milan to work at Isotta Fraschini. In 1951 he was hired back by Ferrari once Busso had left for Alfa Romeo and Colombo had moved to an advisorial role. Lampredi's first Ferrari engine was a large 3.3, 4.1 and 4.5 L displacement V12, which was first used in the 275 S, 275 F1, 340 F1 and 375 F1 race cars. Lampredi's engines were used as naturally aspirated alternatives to the diminutive Colombo-designed V12s used in most Ferrari cars until that time. After the lack of success of Colombo's supercharged Formula One engine, Lampredi's design began to find favor within the company. Lampredi's engine gave Ferrari its first Formula One win when José Froilán González won the British Grand Prix in Silverstone in 1951.

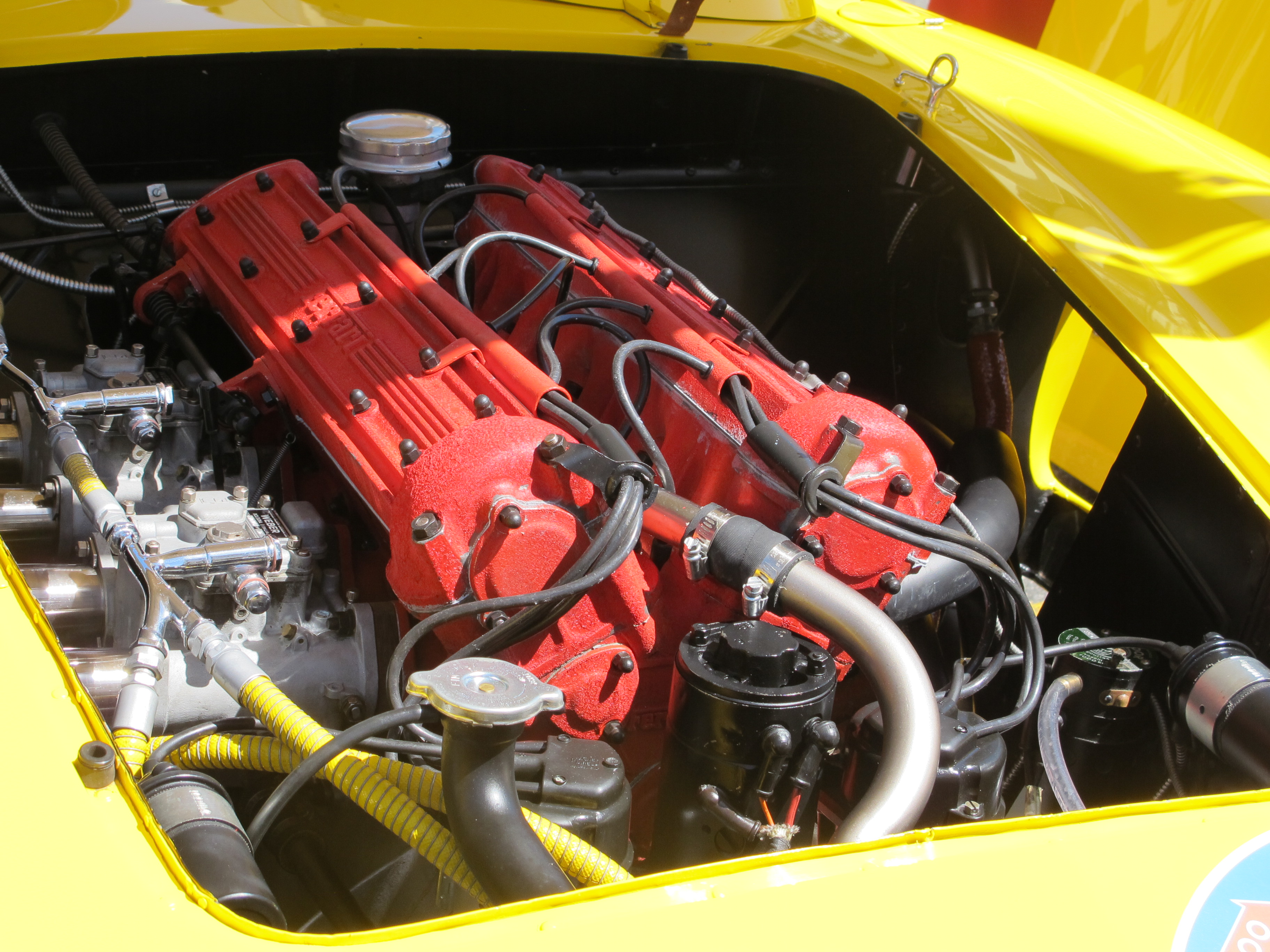
A Lampredi four cylinder engine in a Ferrari 500 TR (Testa Rossa)

In 1951, Enzo Ferrari saw a good opportunity to make a competitive Formula Two racing car, when rules made it possible for Formula Two cars to compete in Formula One until new engine regulations would come into effect in 1954. He suggested to Lampredi that he'd design a twin-cam four-cylinder racing engine. The power unit proved to be very successful in Formula Two, Formula One and sports racing cars, with Alberto Ascari securing back-to-back Formula One World Championships in 1952 and 1953.

Lampredi's tenure at Ferrari ended in 1955 when Ferrari bought Lancia's racing division and famed engine designer Vittorio Jano, formerly of Alfa Romeo, joined the team. Though Lampredi's engine designs continued to be used in Ferrari road cars, Jano's V6 and V12 engines eventually replaced Lampredi's V12s for racing use, with Juan-Manuel Fangio winning the Formula One title in 1956 and Mike Hawthorn in 1958.

== Fiat ==
After Ferrari, Lampredi went to Fiat, where he oversaw that company's engine design efforts until 1977. He designed the Fiat Twin-Cam and SOHC engines, which powered most Fiat and Lancia cars for over 32 years. He managed Fiat's Abarth factory rally racing group from 1973 through 1982.

The Lampredi Twin Cam (Fiat Twin Cam) remains the most successful engine ever on the World Rally Championship circuit, garnering the most wins overall and 10 manufacturer championships for Fiat and Lancia.

In 1976 Lampredi designed the engine that would put Fiat on the Brazilian market – the FIASA (acronym of Portuguese "Fiat Automóveis S.A"). The engine equipped the Fiat 147, a Brazilian derivation of the European Fiat 127. The 147 was the first national vehicle to have a transversely mounted engine with a belt driven overhead camshaft. It was also the first large scale-engine to be powered by ethanol, when such version was made available in the 1979 Fiat 147. The FIASA engine remained in production until 2001 (25 years) until it was superseded by the new FIRE engine.

Lampredi died in Livorno in 1989.
