= Ferrari 553 =

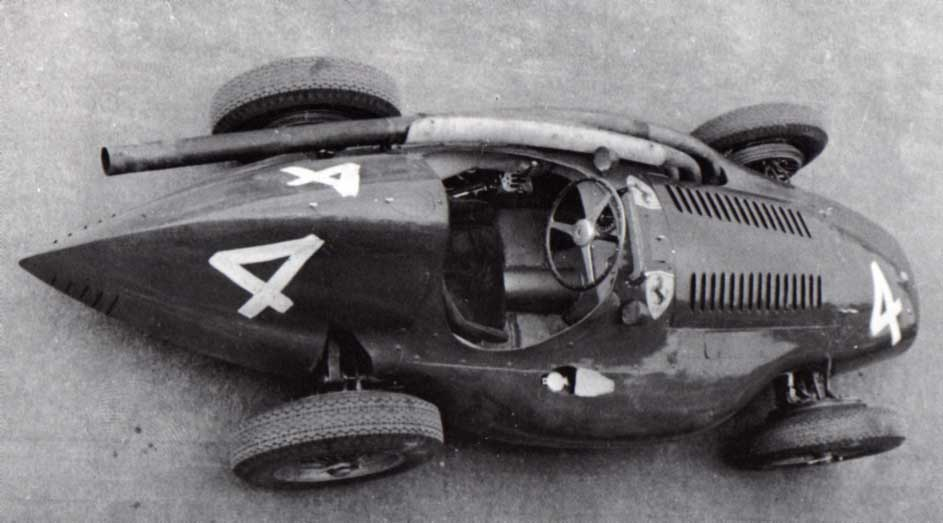
- Category: Formula One
- Constructor: Ferrari
- Predecessor: 500
- Successor: 625/D50

Technical specifications
- Chassis: Single-seater, tubular frame
- Axle track: Front: 1,278 mm (50.3 in); Rear: 1,250 mm (49 in)
- Wheelbase: 2,160 mm (85 in)
- Engine: Lampredi 1,984.86 cc (121.1 cu in) (1953); 2,497.56 cc (152.4 cu in) (1954) L4 naturally aspirated, front engine, longitudinally mounted
- Transmission: Ferrari 4-speed manual
- Weight: 590 kg (1,300 lb)
- Fuel: Shell
- Tyres: Pirelli

Competition history
- Notable entrants: Scuderia Ferrari
- Notable drivers: (Italy) Giuseppe Farina (United Kingdom) Mike Hawthorn (Argentina) Jose Froilan Gonzalez
- Debut: 1953 Italian Grand Prix
Races	Wins	Poles	F/Laps
6	1	0	0
- Constructors' Championships: 0
- Drivers' Championships: 0
- Unless otherwise stated, all data refer to Formula One World Championship Grands Prix only.

The Ferrari 553 was a racing car produced by Ferrari which raced in 1953 (when the World Championship was run to F2 regulations) as a Formula Two car and in 1954 as a Formula One car.

== 553 F1 ==
The 1953 553 F2 car was raced in the 1953 World Drivers' Championship by Umberto Maglioli and Piero Carini. It was first raced at Monza in the 1953 Italian Grand Prix on September 13, 1953. In 1954 the Ferrari 553 F1 car replaced it when the World Championship returned to F1 specifications.

The car competed in six World Championship Grands Prix over the two seasons, making ten individual entries. Its only points finishing position was a win for Mike Hawthorn at the 1954 Spanish Grand Prix in which the lead changed often as many other cars had debris like leaves and newspapers clogging their air intakes.

The engine was a Lampredi inline-four, producing 260 PS (191 kW; 256 hp) at 7200 rpm, from 2497.56 cc of total capacity. Because of the distinctive rounded bodywork and air-intake it was nicknamed Squalo, meaning Shark in Italian.

== 555 F1 ==
In 1955, Ferrari updated their existing 553 F1 car. New helical springs were used for the front suspension, instead of the transverse leaf-springs. The rear saw the replacement of a lower leaf-spring to an upper one. It also received a five-speed gearbox instead of a four-speed. It used the same capacity as before and the power output also remained the same.

Because of the extended, rounded bodywork it was further nicknamed as a Supersqualo (Super shark). The car was first used at the Bordeaux GP on 24 April 1955. In 1956, Peter Collins was still using the 555 F1, whilst the rest of the Scuderia drove the Lancia-Ferrari D50.

== Technical data ==
Technical data	553 Squalo	555 Super Squalo
Engine:	Front mounted 4-cylinder in-line engine	
displacement:	2498 cm³	
Bore x stroke:	100 x 79.5 mm	
Compression:	13.0:1	11.9:1
Max power at rpm:	260 hp at 7 200 rpm	
Valve control:	Double Overhead Camshafts, 2 valves per cylinder	
Carburetor:	2 Weber 50 DCOA/3	
Gearbox:	4-speed manual, transaxle	5-speed manual, transaxle
suspension front:	Double cross links, transverse leaf spring	Double cross links, coil springs
suspension rear:	De Dion axle, double longitudinal links, transverse leaf spring	
Brakes:	Hydraulic drum brakes	
Chassis & body:	Tubular frame with aluminum body	
wheelbase:	216 cm	
Dry weight:	590 kg	
Top speed:	280 km/h	

== Gallery ==
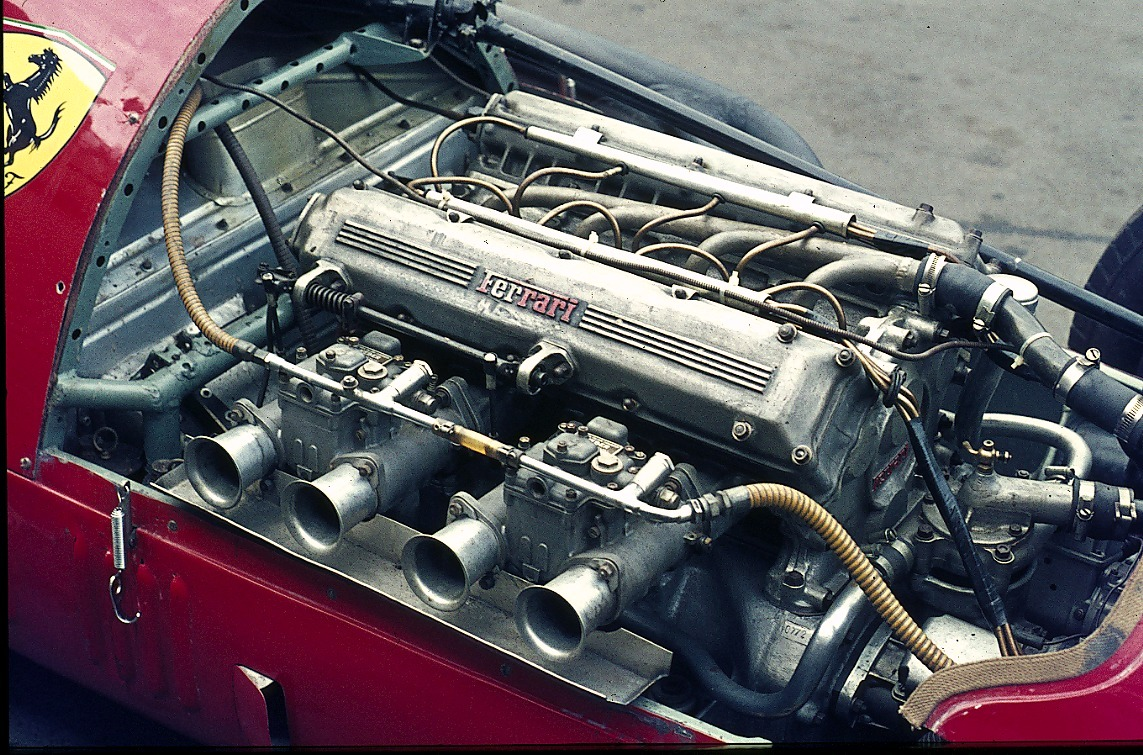
Ferrari 553 "Squalo", 2.5-litre I4 Lampredi engine

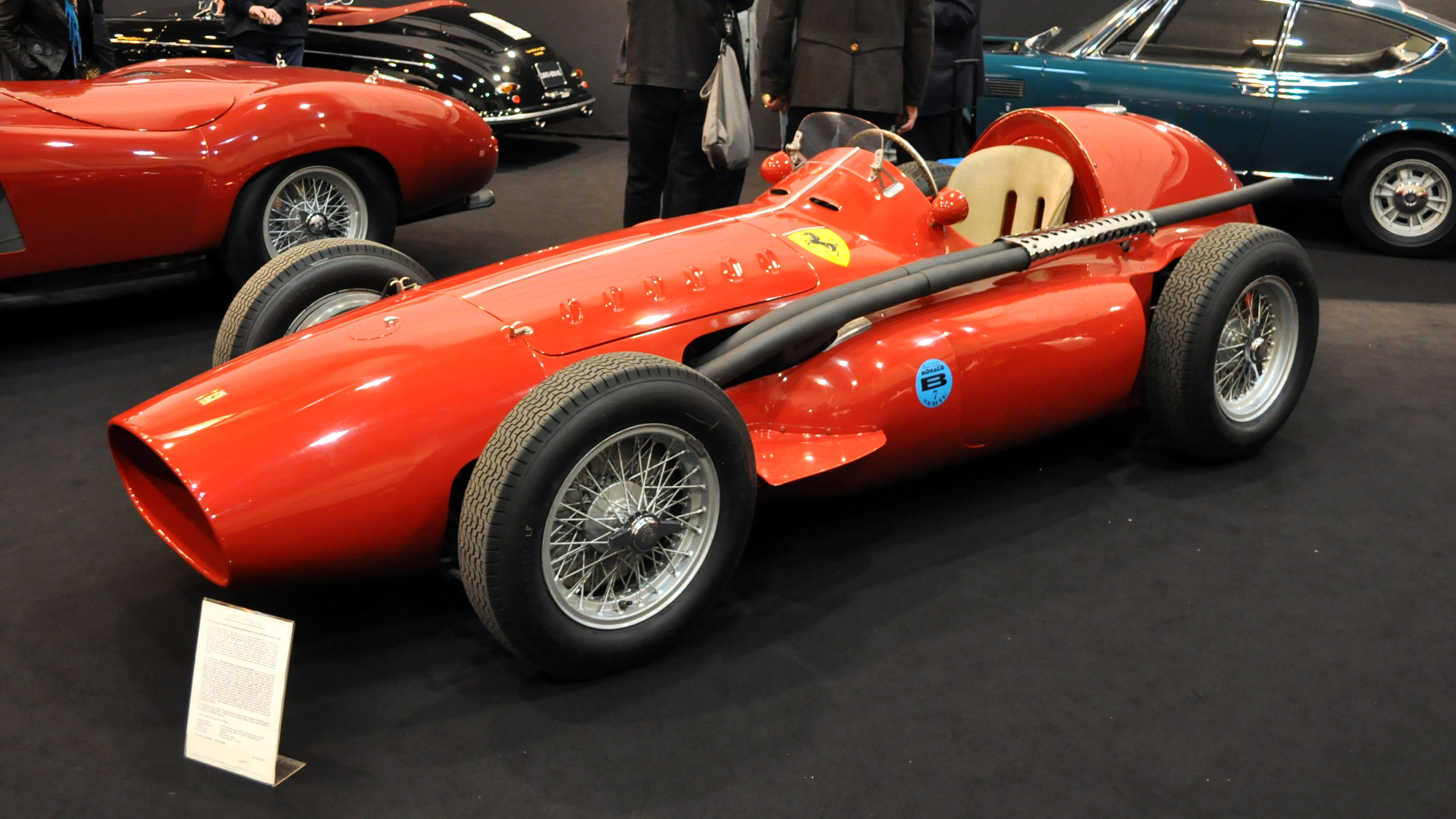
A Ferrari 555 Super Squalo

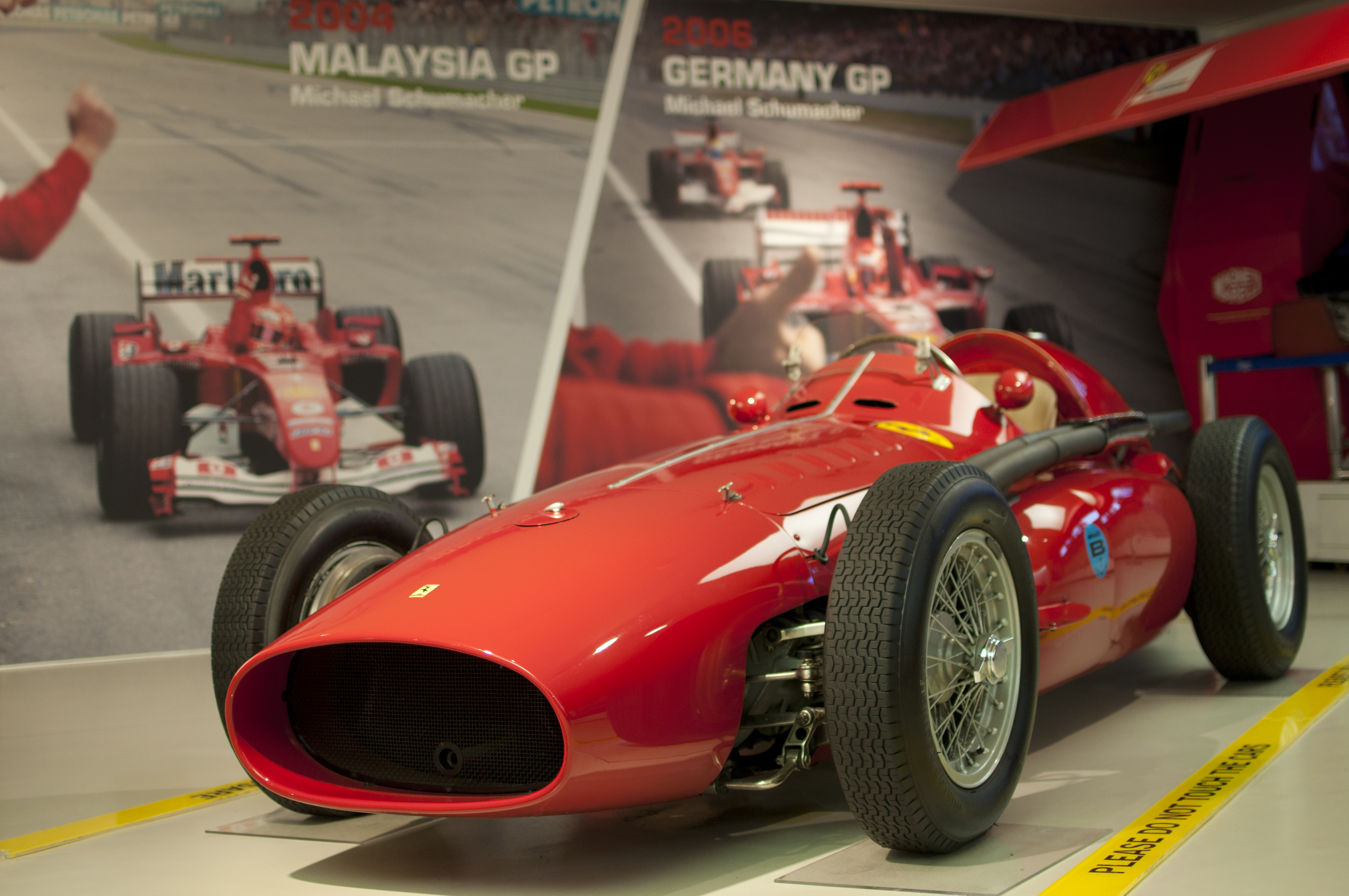
A Ferrari 555 at the Museo Ferrari

== Formula One World Championship results ==
(key)

Year	Entrant	Chassis	Engine	Tyres	Driver	1	2	3	4	5	6	7	8	9
1953	Scuderia Ferrari	553	Ferrari 553 2.0 L4	P		ARG	500	NED	BEL	FRA	GBR	GER	SUI	ITA
1953	Scuderia Ferrari	553	Ferrari 553 2.0 L4	P	Umberto Maglioli									8
1953	Scuderia Ferrari	553	Ferrari 553 2.0 L4	P	Piero Carini									Ret
1954	Scuderia Ferrari	553	Ferrari 554 2.5 L4	P		ARG	500	BEL	FRA	GBR	GER	SUI	ITA	ESP
1954	Scuderia Ferrari	553	Ferrari 554 2.5 L4	P	Giuseppe Farina			Ret						WD
1954	Scuderia Ferrari	553	Ferrari 554 2.5 L4	P	José Froilán González			Ret	Ret				Ret	
1954	Scuderia Ferrari	553	Ferrari 554 2.5 L4	P	Mike Hawthorn				Ret					1
1954	Scuderia Ferrari	553	Ferrari 554 2.5 L4	P	Umberto Maglioli							7		
1954	Scuderia Ferrari	553	Ferrari 554 2.5 L4	P	Robert Manzon							DNS		
1954	Scuderia Ferrari	553	Ferrari 554 2.5 L4	P	Maurice Trintignant									Ret
1955	Scuderia Ferrari	555	Ferrari 555 2.5 L4	E		ARG	MON	500	BEL	NED	GBR	ITA		
1955	Scuderia Ferrari	555	Ferrari 555 2.5 L4	E	Harry Schell		Ret							
1955	Scuderia Ferrari	555	Ferrari 555 2.5 L4	E	Paul Frère		8^{2}		4					
1955	Scuderia Ferrari	555	Ferrari 555 2.5 L4	E	Piero Taruffi		8^{2}		DNS					
1955	Scuderia Ferrari	555	Ferrari 555 2.5 L4	E	Giuseppe Farina				3					
1955	Scuderia Ferrari	555	Ferrari 555 2.5 L4	E	Maurice Trintignant				6	Ret		8		
1955	Scuderia Ferrari	555	Ferrari 555 2.5 L4	E	Eugenio Castellotti					5		3		
1955	Scuderia Ferrari	555	Ferrari 555 2.5 L4	E	Mike Hawthorn					7		Ret		
1955	Scuderia Ferrari	555	Ferrari 555 2.5 L4	E	Umberto Maglioli							6		
1956	Scuderia Ferrari	555	Ferrari 555 2.5 L4; Ferrari DS50 2.5 V8	E		ARG	MON	500	BEL	FRA	GBR	GER	ITA	
1956	Scuderia Ferrari	555	Ferrari 555 2.5 L4; Ferrari DS50 2.5 V8	E	Peter Collins	Ret								
1956	Scuderia Ferrari	555	Ferrari 555 2.5 L4; Ferrari DS50 2.5 V8	E	Olivier Gendebien	5								
