= Ferrari 340 MM =

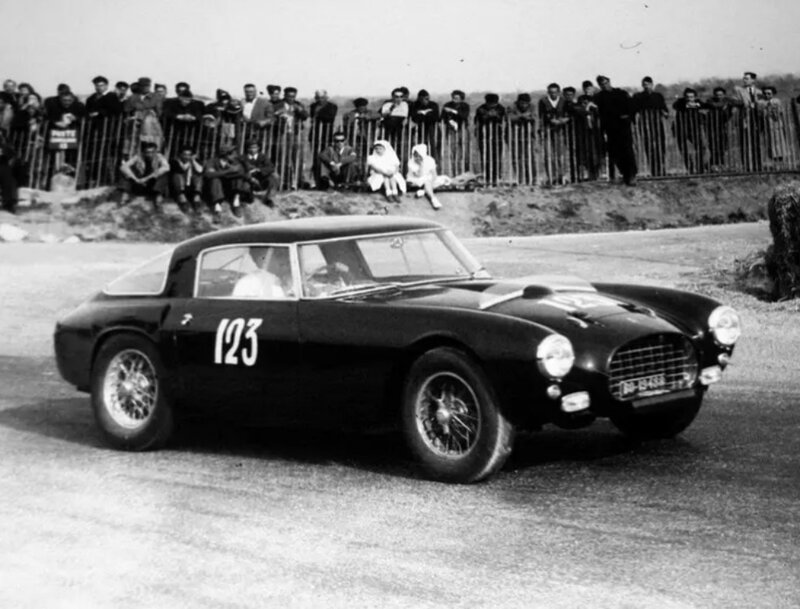
- Ferrari 340 MM Berlinetta

Overview
- Manufacturer: Ferrari
- Production: 1953; 10 produced

Powertrain
- Engine: 4.1 L (4101.66 cc) Lampredi V12
- Transmission: 5-speed

Chronology
- Predecessor: Ferrari 340 Mexico
- Successor: Ferrari 375 MM

The Ferrari 340 MM is a sports racing car, being an evolution of the Ferrari 340 Mexico with a shorter, 2,500 mm (98.4 in), wheelbase. The 340 MM used the same 4.1 L Lampredi V12 as the 340 Mexico with similar three Weber 40DCF carburettors that helped the 340 achieve 280 PS (206 kW) at 6600 rpm and a maximum speed of 282 km/h. 10 examples were made in 1953, 4 Pinin Farina Berlinettas, 2 Touring Spyders and 4 Vignale Spyders (designed by Giovanni Michelotti). A total of four were converted to 375 MM spec. Giannino Marzotto won the 1953 Mille Miglia in a Vignale Spyder (chassis 0280AM), setting a new average speed record for the race; with other 340 MM finishing fourth. Two more 340 MMs were entered that year in Touring barchetta guise but did not finish.

== Chassis numbers ==
Number	Body style	Note
0236MM	Pinin Farina Berlinetta	
0268AM	Touring Spyder	
0280AM	Vignale Spyder	Won the 1953 Mille Miglia.
0284AM	Vignale Spyder	Crashed in the 1953 Le Mans, killing driver Tom Cole. Rebodied after the crash as a Touring Barchetta by Fantuzzi.
0294AM	Touring Spyder (later Scaglietti Spyder)	Heavily damaged in a crash, body rebuilt by Scaglietti.
0318AM	Pinin Farina Berlinetta	Converted to 375 MM.
0320AM	Pinin Farina Berlinetta	Converted to 375 MM. Sold in 2013 for €9,856,000.
0322AM	Pinin Farina Berlinetta	Converted to 375 MM.
0324AM	Vignale Spyder	Originally sold to racing driver Bill Spear.
0350AM	Vignale Spyder	Sold in 2012 for $4,730,000.

== Racing results ==
(key)

Year	Entrant	Chassis	1	2	3	4	5	6	7
1953	—		(United States) SEB	(Italy) MMI	(France) LMS	(Belgium) SPA	(West Germany) NÜR	(United Kingdom) TTR	(Mexico) PAN
1953	(Italy) Scuderia Ferrari	0268AM		Ret					
1953	(Italy) Scuderia Ferrari	0280AM		1	Ret				
1953	(Italy) Scuderia Ferrari	0294AM		Ret					
1953	(Italy) Scuderia Ferrari	0320AM			DSQ				
1953	(Italy) Scuderia Ferrari	0322AM			5				
1953	(United States) Tom Cole	0284AM		4	Ret				
