= Piero Scotti =

Italian racing driver (1909–1976)

- Born: 11 November 1909; Florence, Tuscany
- Died: 14 February 1976 (aged 66); Samedan, Graubünden

Formula One World Championship career
- Nationality: (Italy) Italian
- Active years: 1956
- Team: privateer Connaught
- Entries: 1
- Championships: 0
- Wins: 0
- Podiums: 0
- Career points: 0
- Pole positions: 0
- Fastest laps: 0
- First entry: 1956 Belgian Grand Prix

Piero Scotti (11 November 1909 – 14 February 1976) was a racing driver from Italy. He participated in one Formula One World Championship Grand Prix on 3 June 1956. He scored no championship points.

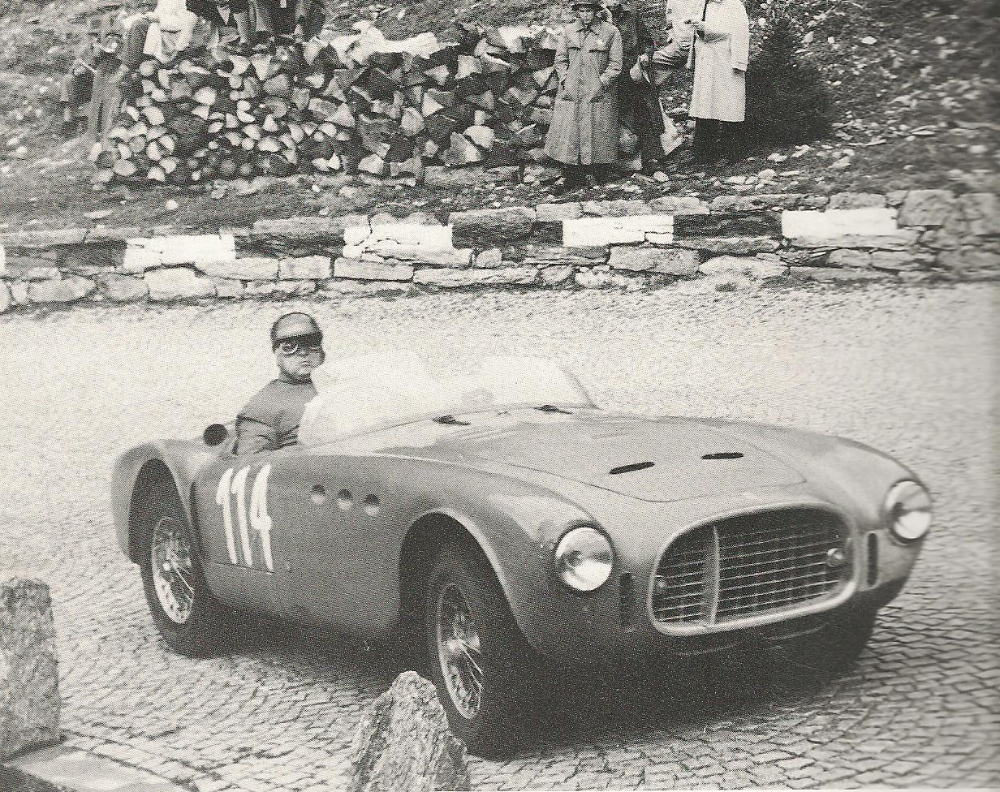
Scotti driving a Ferrari 340 America Vignale Spyder in the Maloja Pass hillclimb in 1952

== Complete Formula One World Championship results ==
(key)

Year	Entrant	Chassis	Engine	1	2	3	4	5	6	7	8	WDC	Points
1956	Piero Scotti	Connaught B Type	Alta Straight-4	ARG	MON	500	BEL; Ret	FRA; DNA	GBR	GER	ITA	NC	0
