= Ferrari 340 Mexico =

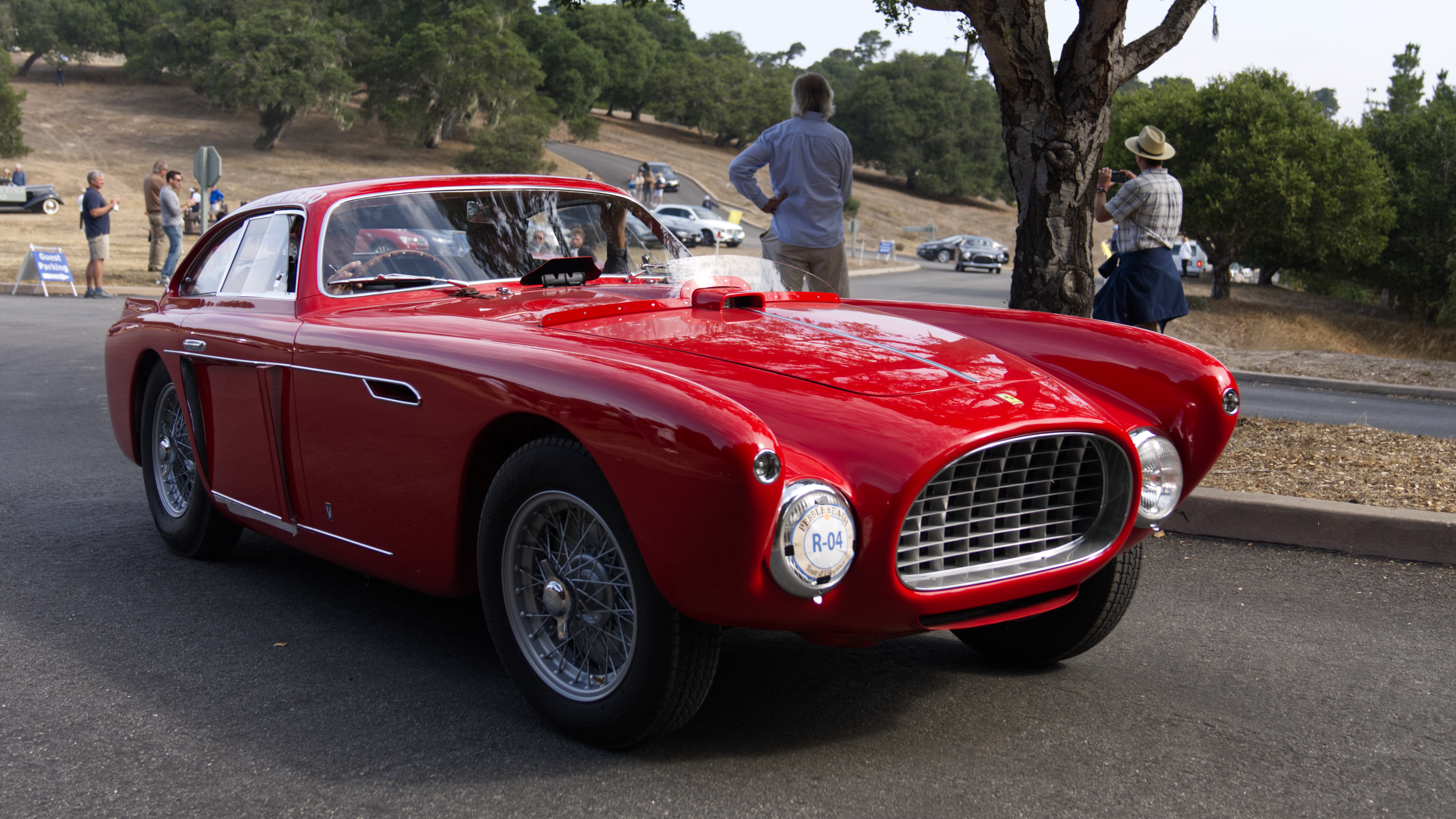
- Ferrari 340 Mexico Berlinetta (0226AT)

Overview
- Manufacturer: Ferrari
- Production: 1952; 4 produced
- Designer: Giovanni Michelotti for Vignale

Powertrain
- Engine: 4.1 L (4101.66 cc) Lampredi V12
- Power output: 280 hp
- Transmission: 5-speed

Chronology
- Successor: Ferrari 340 MM

The Ferrari 340 Mexico was a Ferrari sports racing car which was intended for the 1952 Carrera Panamericana. It used 4.1 L Lampredi V12 engine producing around 280 PS (206 kW) at 6600 rpm, for a maximum speed of 280 km/h. Just 4 were made in 1952, 3 Vignale Berlinettas and 1 Vignale Spyder; all designed by Giovanni Michelotti. The 340 Mexico used a 2,600 mm (102.4 in) wheelbase.

All 4 cars were entered into the race but only one finished.

Originally all owned by Luigi Chinetti, two of the berlinettas (0222AT and 0226AT) were sold to American Allen Guibertson for $14,500 each while the third berlinetta (0224AT) continued to be raced by Luigi Chinetti in the Mille Miglia, 12 Hours of Reims and 12 Hours of Pescara.

== Chassis numbers ==
Number	Body style	Drivers in 1952 Carrera Panamericana	Race results	Note	Paint
0222AT	Berlinetta	Franco Cornacchia and Luigi Villoresi	DNF (mechanical problems)		Red/white two-tone livery
0224AT	Berlinetta	Luigi Chinetti and Jean Lucas	3rd	Sold in 2011 for $4,290,000	Red
0226AT	Berlinetta	Alberto Ascari and Giuseppi Scotuzzi	Crashed (repaired after race)	Sold in 2011 for $3,685,000	Red racing livery
0228AT	Spyder	Bill Spear	Did not start		Red
