= Ferrari Superamerica =

Ferrari has used the Superamerica name on a number of high-end products:

- 1956 410 Superamerica
- 1960 400 Superamerica
- 2005 Superamerica (Ferrari 575M-based limited production)
- 2010 Superamerica 45 (Ferrari 599 GTB-based one-off)
