= Ferrari 410 S =

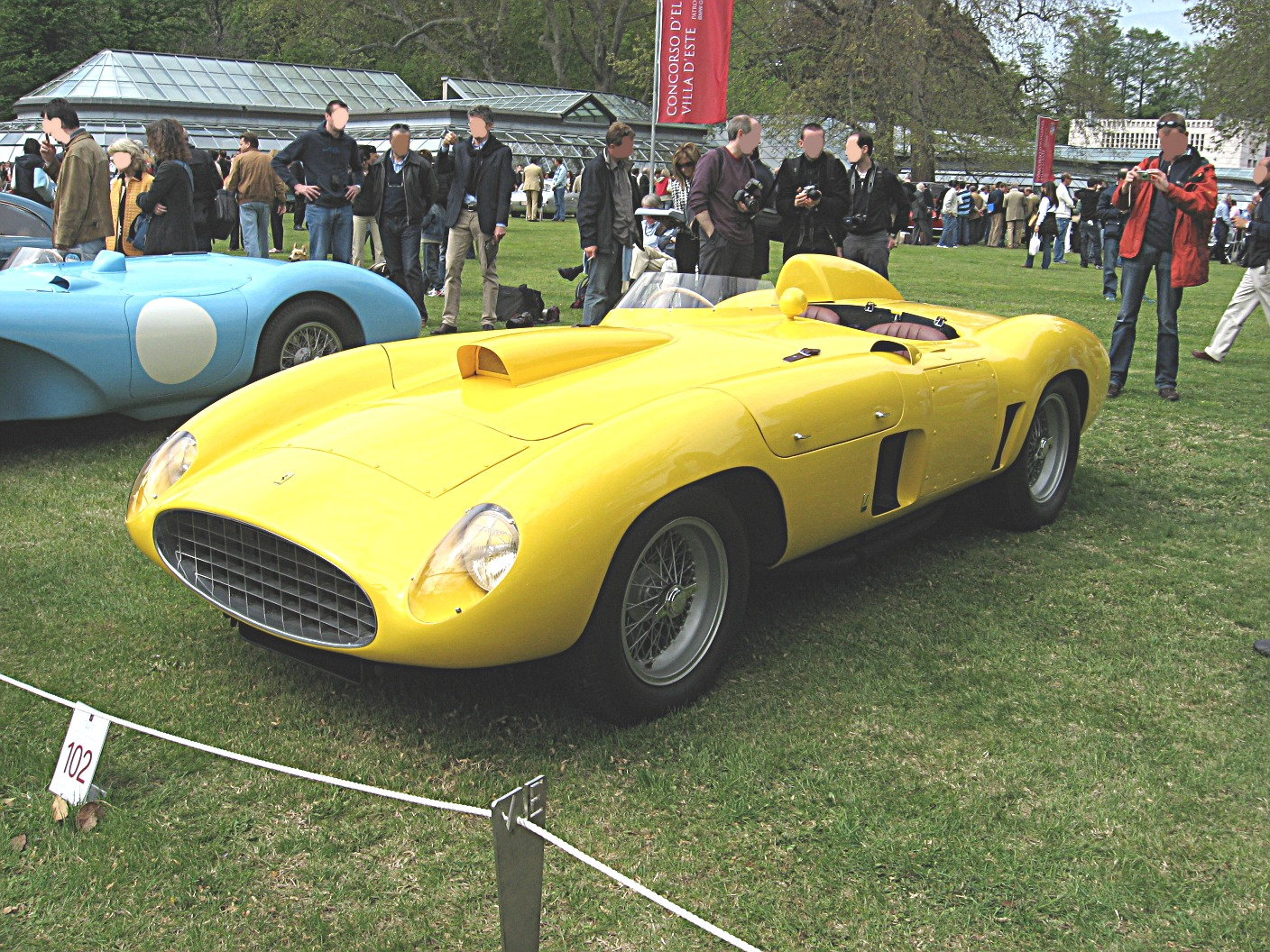

Overview
- Manufacturer: Ferrari
- Also called: Ferrari 410 Sport
- Production: 1955–1956; 4 produced
- Designer: Carrozzeria Scaglietti

Body and chassis
- Body style: Spyder; Berlinetta (Speciale)
- Layout: Front mid-engine, rear-wheel-drive

Powertrain
- Engine: 5.0 L (4962.96 cc) Tipo 126C Lampredi V12
- Power output: 340/380 PS
- Transmission: 5-speed manual

Dimensions
- Wheelbase: 2,420 mm (95.3 in)
- Curb weight: 1,200 kg (2,646 lb)

Chronology
- Predecessor: Ferrari 375 Plus
- Successor: Ferrari 290 MM

The Ferrari 410 S was a sports racing car produced by Ferrari in 1955–1956. After the racing successes of 375 Plus, mainly in 1954 Carrera Panamericana, Ferrari decided to prepare another model for this marathon. The 410 S was intended as a long-distance race car originally designed for the 1955 Carrera Panamericana and was the final model of the Lampredi V12 sports car lineage. The next generation of sports racing cars that replaced the 410 S were powered by the new Jano V12 engines.

== Development ==
The Ferrari 410 S was created as an evolution of the 375 Plus that preceded it. All four serial numbers bear "CM" suffix standing for "Carrera Messicana" of their intended, but never realised, race. The Mexican marathon was cancelled for 1955 edition, mainly due to the Le Mans disaster.

== Specifications ==
=== Engine and transmission ===
A familiar long-block 5.0 L Lampredi V12 with a different internal measurements was used. Compared to 375 Plus, 410 S engine had a bigger bore and a shorter stroke at 88 by 68 mm (3.5 by 2.7 in). The total displacement resulting was 4,962.96 cc (5.0 L; 302.9 cu in). This same basic Type 126 single plug engine powered the 410 Superamerica road car. A smaller 42DCZ/3 Weber carburettors and a lower compression ratio combined with a higher rpm meant only a slight increase in power from 330 to 340 PS (243 to 250 kW; 325 to 335 hp) at 6,200 rpm in its single plug form. When the engine was upgraded to a twin plugs per cylinder, four coils, and a three 46DCF/3 Webers, power rose to 380 PS (279 kW; 375 hp) at 7,000 rpm. Out of four cars only two factory race cars received the uprated Type 126/C competition engine. An additional spark plugs were located outside of the cylinder banks and were accessible by a trapdoors in the bodywork. This was the only Lampredi V12 with a twin plug arrangement and also the highest in output. A double ignition was designed for harsh conditions of the five-day Mexican race. The top speed was 280–303 km/h (174–188 mph), depending on the ignition version. All cars used dry sump lubrication, triple-plate clutch and a 5-speed manual gearbox mounted at the rear of a transaxle type.

=== Chassis and suspension ===
The chassis was made of an elliptical section steel tubes. Mainly classified as the type 519C with a wheelbase measuring 2,420 mm (95.3 in). The front suspension was independent with an unequal-length wishbones. The rear had De Dion axle and transverse leaf springs, already introduced on racing Ferraris a couple years back. Brakes were drum-type all round. The fuel tank could accommodate 195 litres of fuel. Front and rear track was at 1,455–1,450 mm (57.3–57.1 in), which was considerably wider compared to a preceding 375 MM or Plus and a succeeding 290 MM cars that had between 1,284 and 1,325 mm (50.6 and 52.2 in) of track.

One of the race cars had a different, slightly shorter type 514 chassis with 2,410 mm (94.9 in) of wheelbase.

== Speciale ==
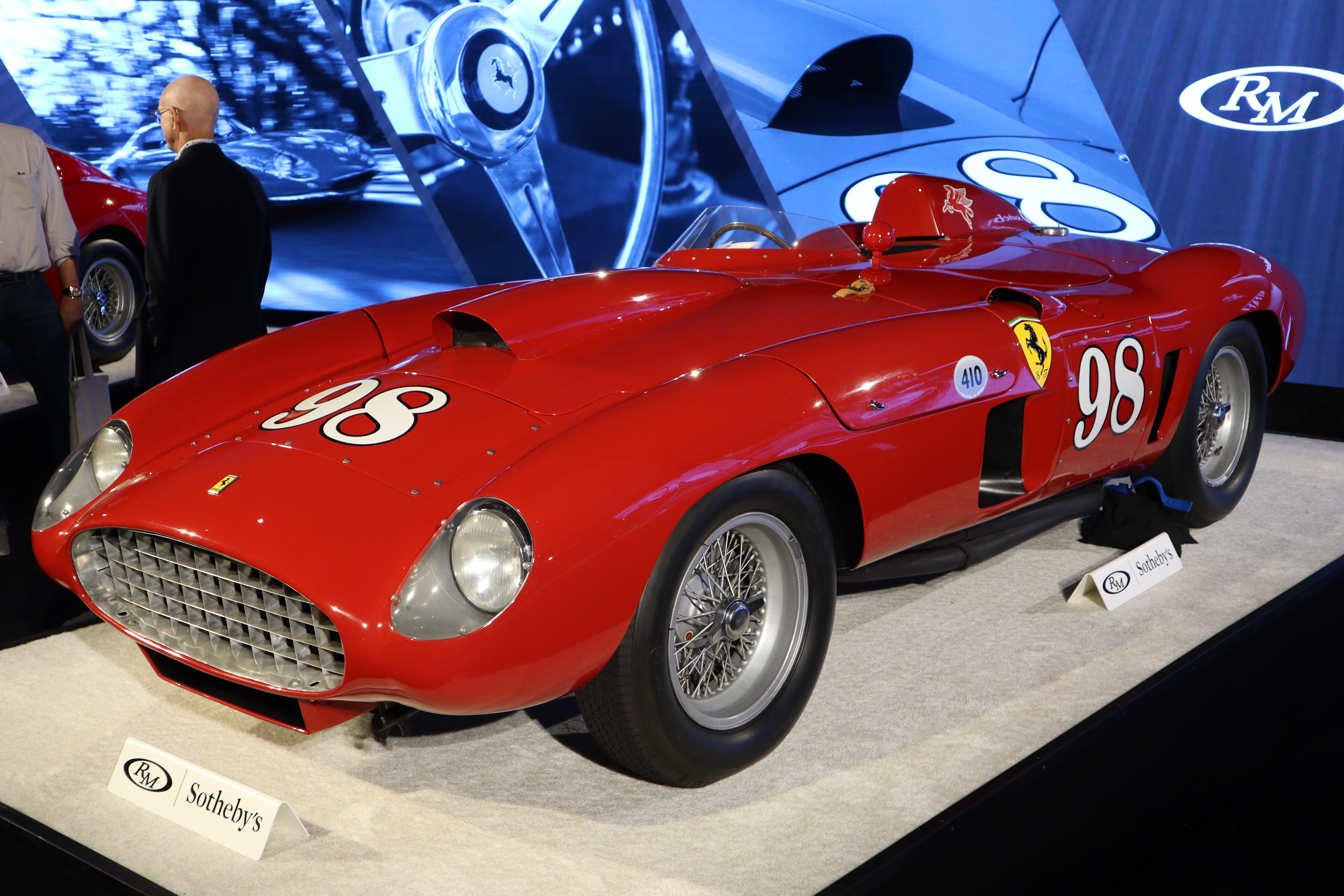
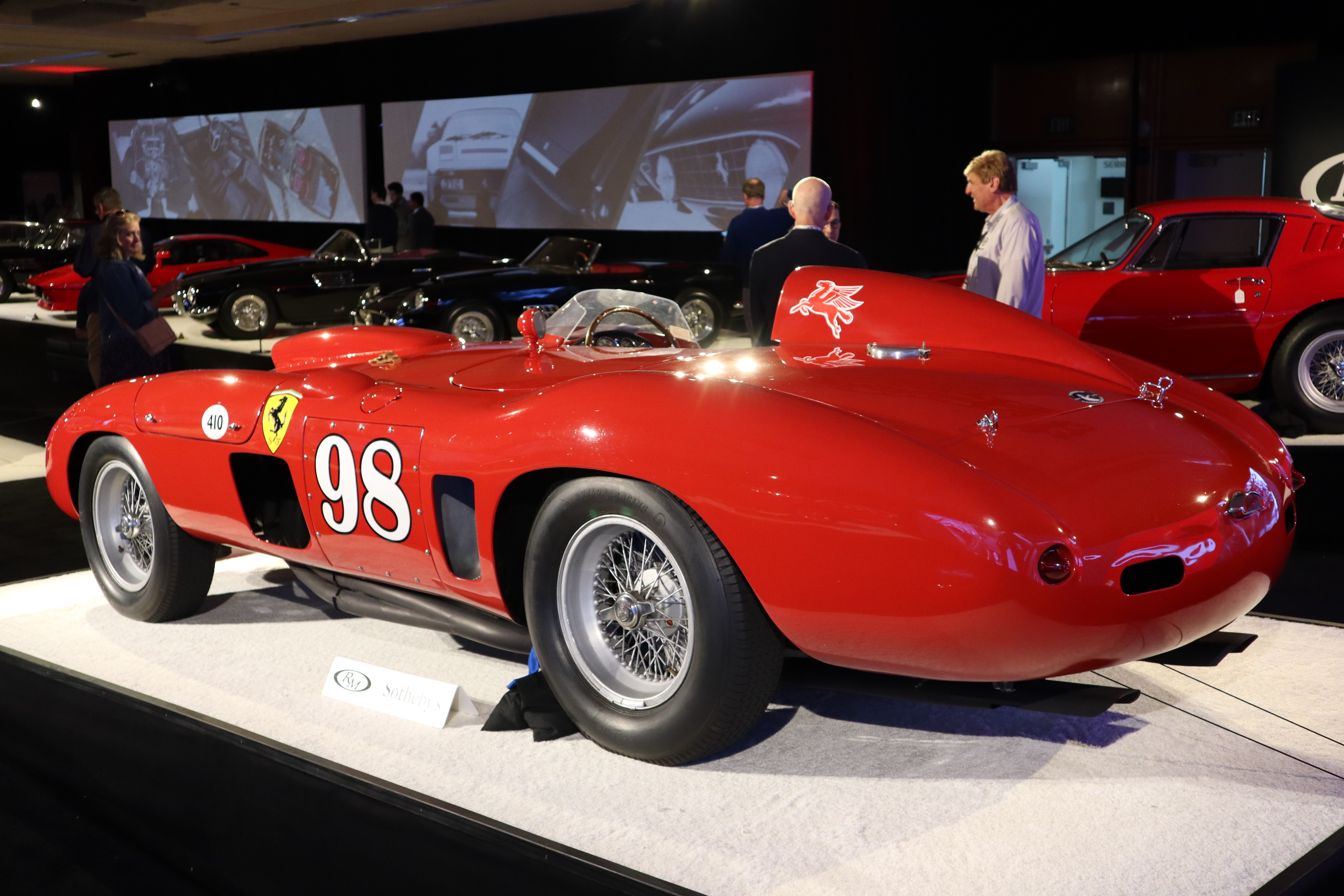
1956 410 S s/n 0598CM at RM Sotheby's 2022 Monterey where it sold for US$23 million.

A one-off Berlinetta Speciale by Carrozzeria Scaglietti, s/n 0594CM, was also created. It was a special order from Michel Paul-Cavallier, an industrialist and a former SEFAC director. The body design loosely resembled Pinin Farina-designed berlinettas but had to be transferred to a shorter chassis with a wider track. The engine was of a single plug type and used three Weber 42DCF/3 carburettors. The car was based on a race car type 519C chassis, completed by July 1955 and delivered with ivory paintwork with blue leather interior to its first owner. The same as the race cars it was also right-hand drive.

== Racing ==
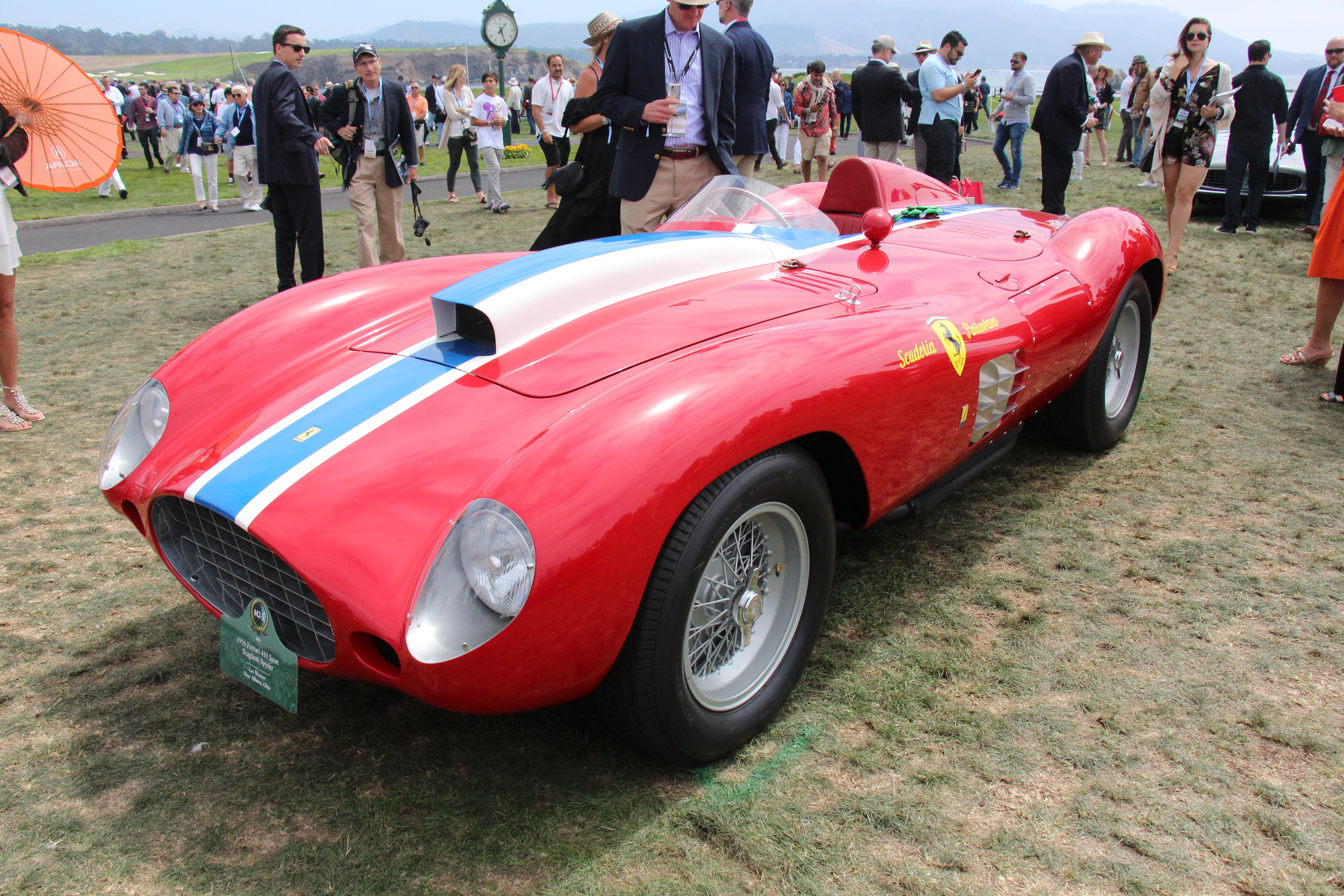
1955 410 S s/n 0592CM at Pebble Beach Concours d'Elegance

The 410 S' first outing was 1956 1000km of Buenos Aires, driven by Juan Manuel Fangio and Eugenio Castellotti. Although two cars entered and neither finished, they achieved a top speed of 303 km/h (188 mph) and set a new lap record. This was the only race in which the 410 S was entered as a works car. Caroll Shelby raced one of those cars in United States with many victories in 1956: in Palm Springs, National Seafair, National Palm Springs, Governor's Trophy and New Smyrna Beach amongst them.

Phil Hill and Richie Ginther also raced in the US, the latter winning the 1957 Riverside race. Cars had common problems with rear axles or transmissions that could not endure the immense power. In 1957 Cuban Grand Prix, among many entered Ferraris, the 410 S was able to achieve second place, driven by Caroll Shelby. The car was entered by John Edgar. Same feat was repeated in 1958 edition of the Havana Grand Prix, this time Masten Gregory was behind the wheel.

=== Racing results ===
(key)

Year	Entrant	Chassis	1	2	3	4	5
1956	—		(Argentina) BUE	(United States) SEB	(Italy) MMI	(West Germany) NÜR	(Sweden) SWE
1956	(Italy) Scuderia Ferrari	0598CM	Ret				
1956	(Italy) Scuderia Ferrari	0596CM	Ret				
1956	(Sweden) Sture Nottorp	0596CM					7

== Collectability ==
The Ferrari 410 S is highly collectable due to its extremely low production values and high performance. In 2012, Berlinetta Speciale s/n 0594CM was sold on RM Sotheby's auction in Monterey for US$8.25 million. In 2014 s/n 0592CM was sold on Rick Cole Auctions for US$23 million. This was the car with shorter wheelbase and single plug engine.
