= Ferrari America =

Ferrari 340 America, 342 America, 375 America, 410 Superamerica, 400 Superamerica, 500 Superfast, 365 California
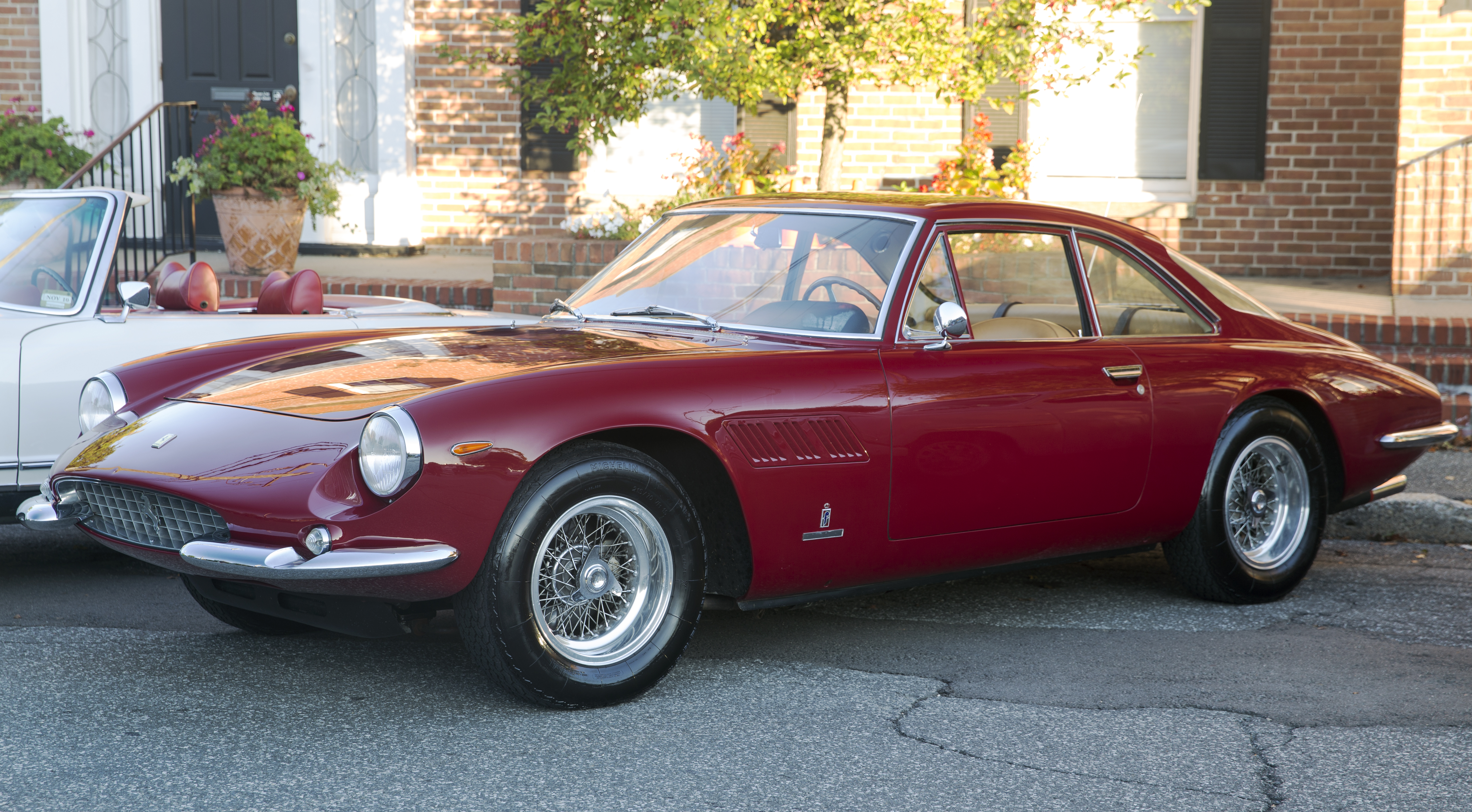
- 1964 Ferrari 500 Superfast

Overview
- Manufacturer: Ferrari
- Production: 1950–1967

Body and chassis
- Class: Grand tourer
- Layout: Front-engine, rear-wheel-drive

Powertrain
- Engine: V12

Ferrari America is a series of flagship grand touring Ferrari models primarily built for the North American market in the 1950s and 1960s. The America models were equipped with large V12 engines and often had custom bodywork done by famous coachbuilders in Italy. All America models were front-engined, rear-wheel-drive, used a live rear axle, and had worm and sector steering.

Two models from the series, the 410 and the 400, were called Superamerica, with the final model, the 500 being called the superfast. The America series also includes the 365 California.

== 340 America ==
Ferrari 340 America
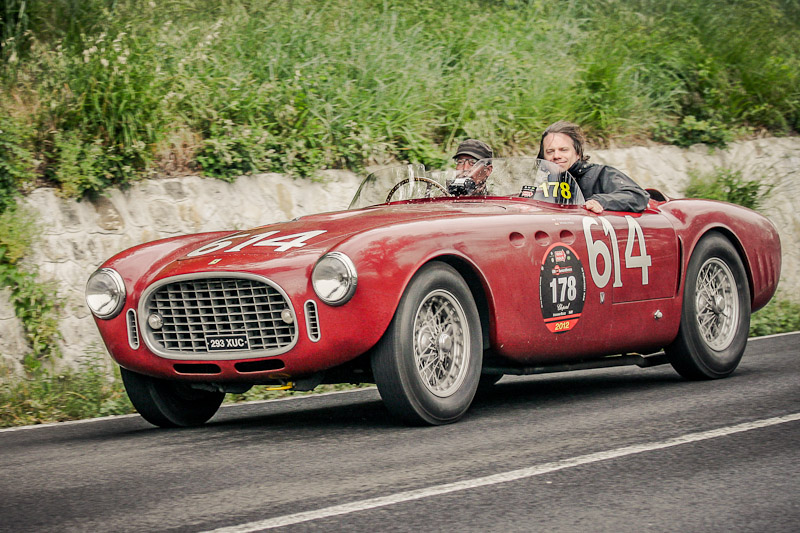
- Ferrari 340 America Vignale Spyder

Overview
- Production: 1950–1952; 25 produced (two converted from 275 S)
- Designer: Giovanni Michelotti at Vignale; Carrozzeria Touring

Body and chassis
- Body style: 2-door coupé 2-door roadster

Powertrain
- Engine: 4.1 L (4,101.66 cc) Lampredi V12
- Power output: 220 PS (217 hp; 162 kW) (340)
- Transmission: 5-speed manual

Dimensions
- Wheelbase: 2,420 mm (95.3 in)
- Kerb weight: 900 kg (1,984 lb) (dry, berlinetta)

The first America cars were called the 340 and were produced between 1950 and 1952. The new Lampredi V12 developed for Formula One racing was rated at 220 PS (162 kW; 217 hp). Originally only 23 units were built: 11 by Vignale, eight by Touring, and four by Ghia. Giovanni Michelotti was tasked with the design work for the cars produced by Vignale. The first two Americas were converted from the 275 S. In 1951, 340 America Vignale Berlinetta won Mille Miglia race driven by Luigi Villoresi. Three Touring barchettas were also entered that year but did not finish.

The 340 America was succeeded by the 375 America.

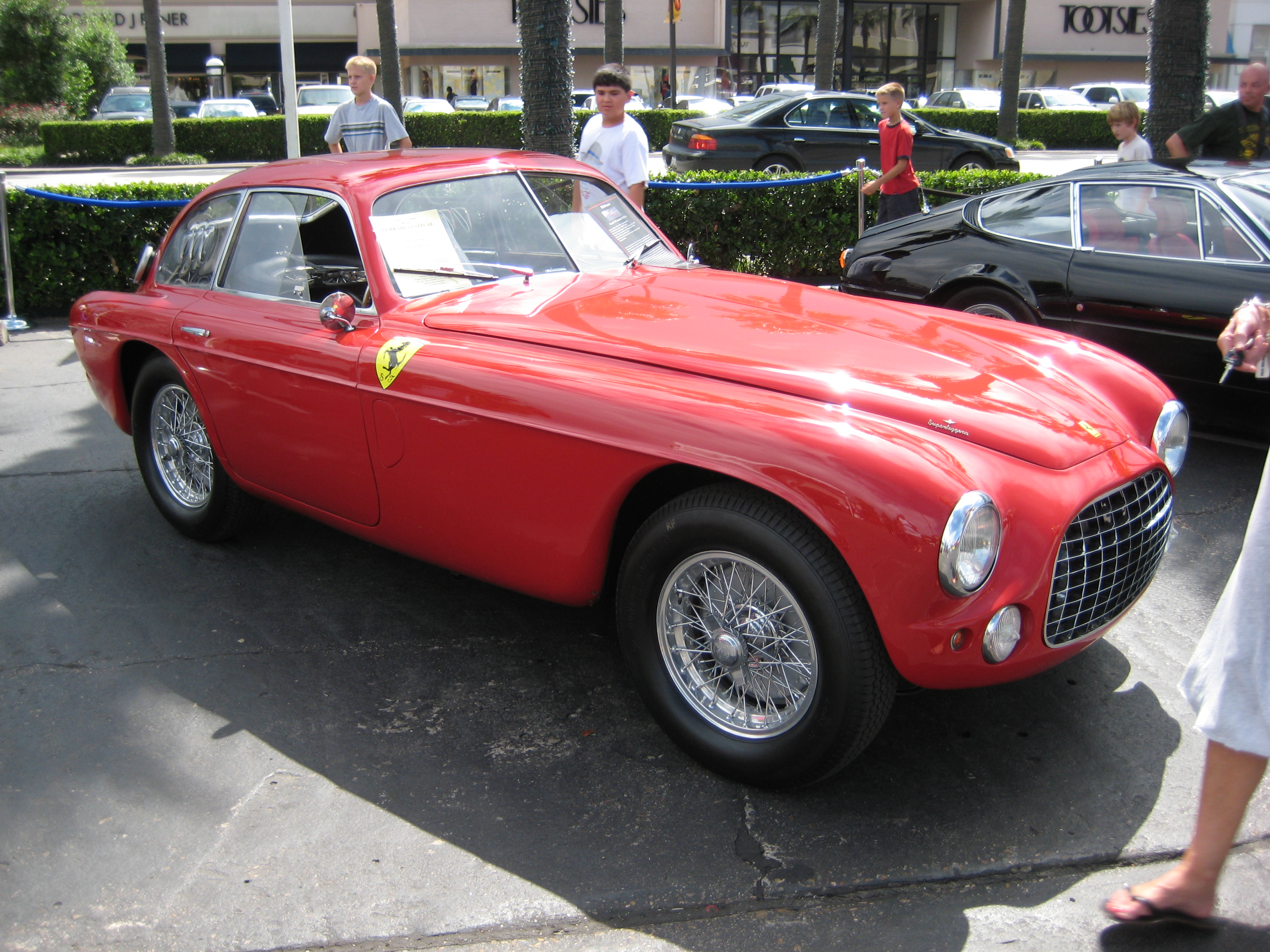
Ferrari 340 America Touring Berlinetta

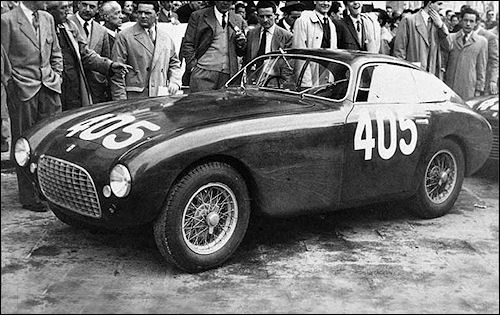
Ferrari 340 America Vignale Coupé that won the 1951 Mille Miglia

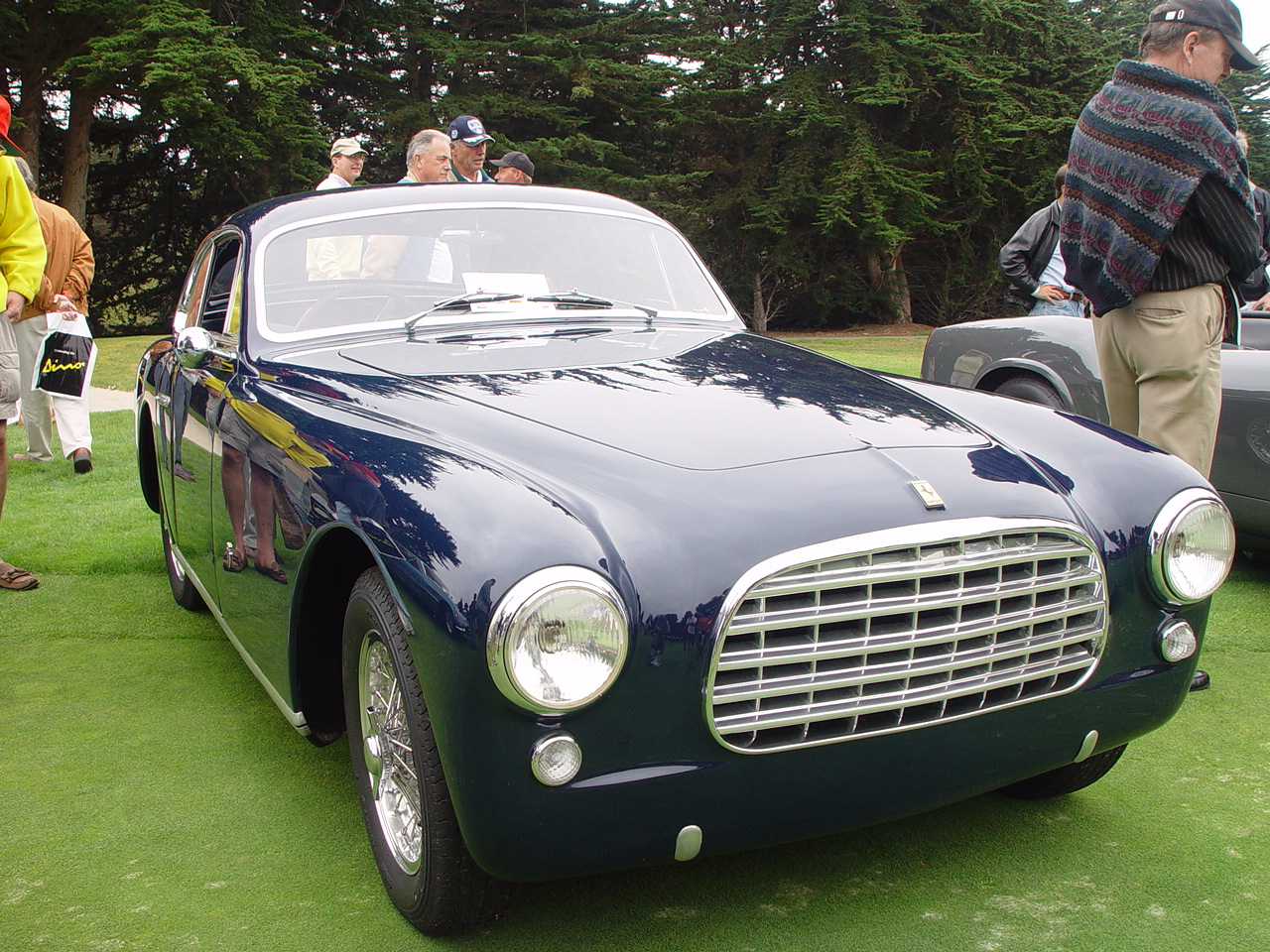
Ferrari 340 America Ghia Coupé

== 342 America ==
Ferrari 342 America
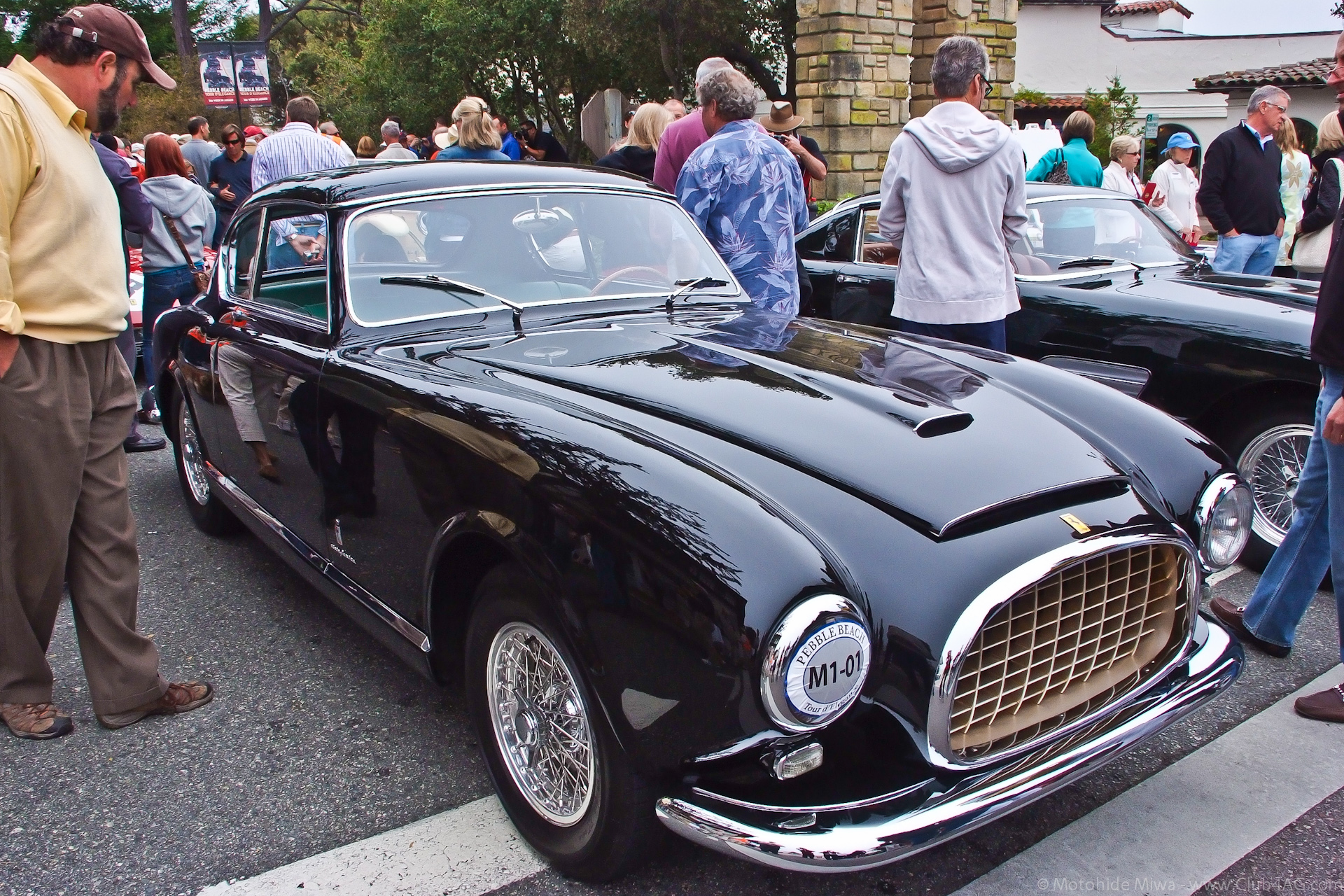
- Ferrari 342 America Pinin Farina Coupé

Overview
- Production: 1952; 6 produced
- Designer: Carrozzeria Pinin Farina

Body and chassis
- Body style: 2-door coupé 2-door convertible

Powertrain
- Engine: 4.1 L (4101.66 cc) Lampredi V12
- Power output: 200 PS
- Transmission: 4-speed manual

Dimensions
- Wheelbase: 2,650 mm (104.3 in)
- Kerb weight: 1,200 kg (2,646 lb)

Only six road cars were made: Vignale Cabriolet (designed by Giovanni Michelotti), two Pinin Farina Cabriolets and three Pinin Farina Coupés. Using the same Lampredi-designed engine as in 340 America with a different carburettor air filter arrangement and thus was detuned to 200 hp (147 kW). Last example, the Pinin Farina Cabriolet s/n 0248AL presented at 1953 New York Auto show, was upgraded to 4.5 L engine. Both 340/342 Americas used even chassis numbering of a race cars, while 375 America and later used odd chassis numbering of a road cars. A Black Pinin Farina Cabriolet was owned by King Leopold III of Belgium.

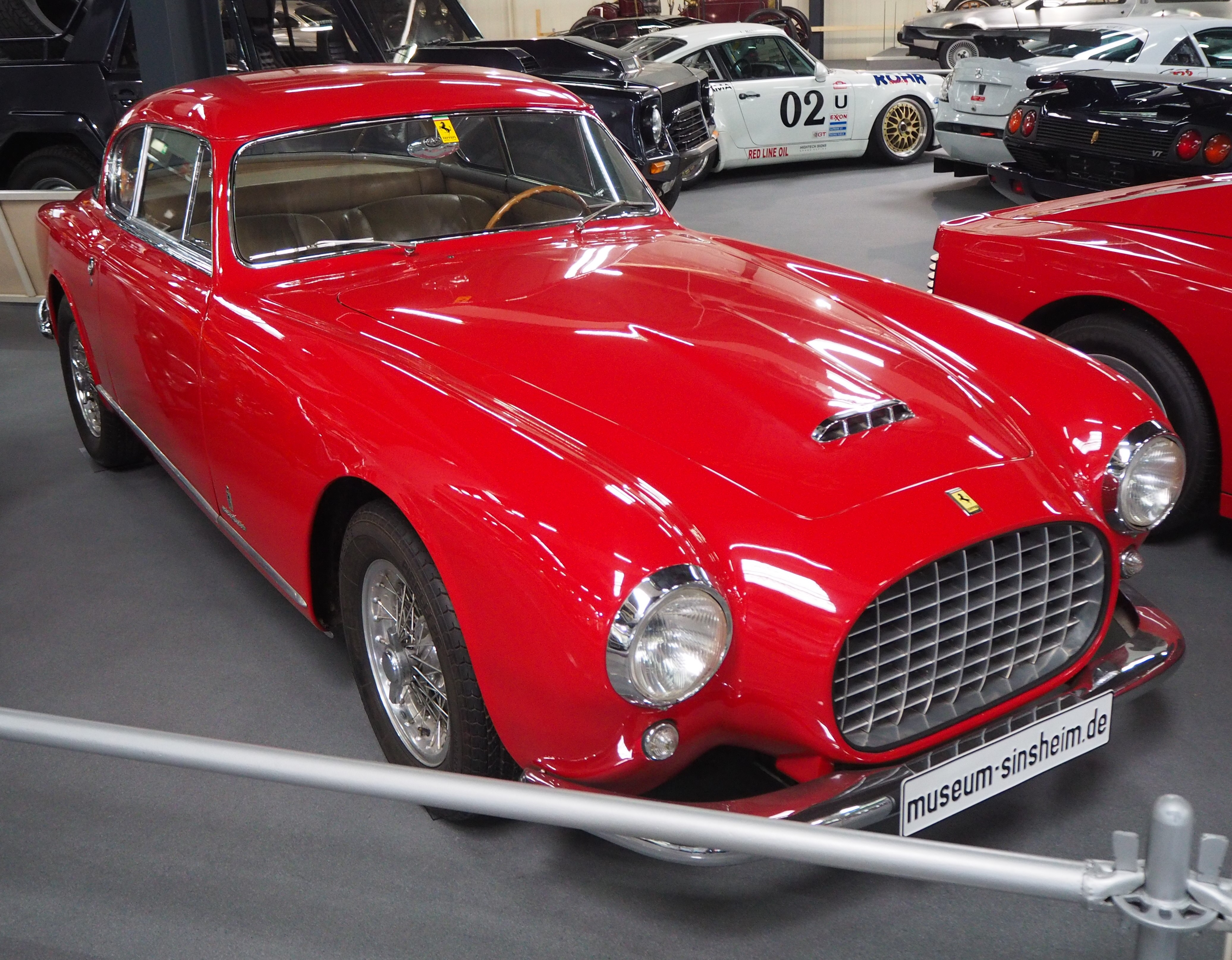
Ferrari 342 America Pinin Farina Coupé

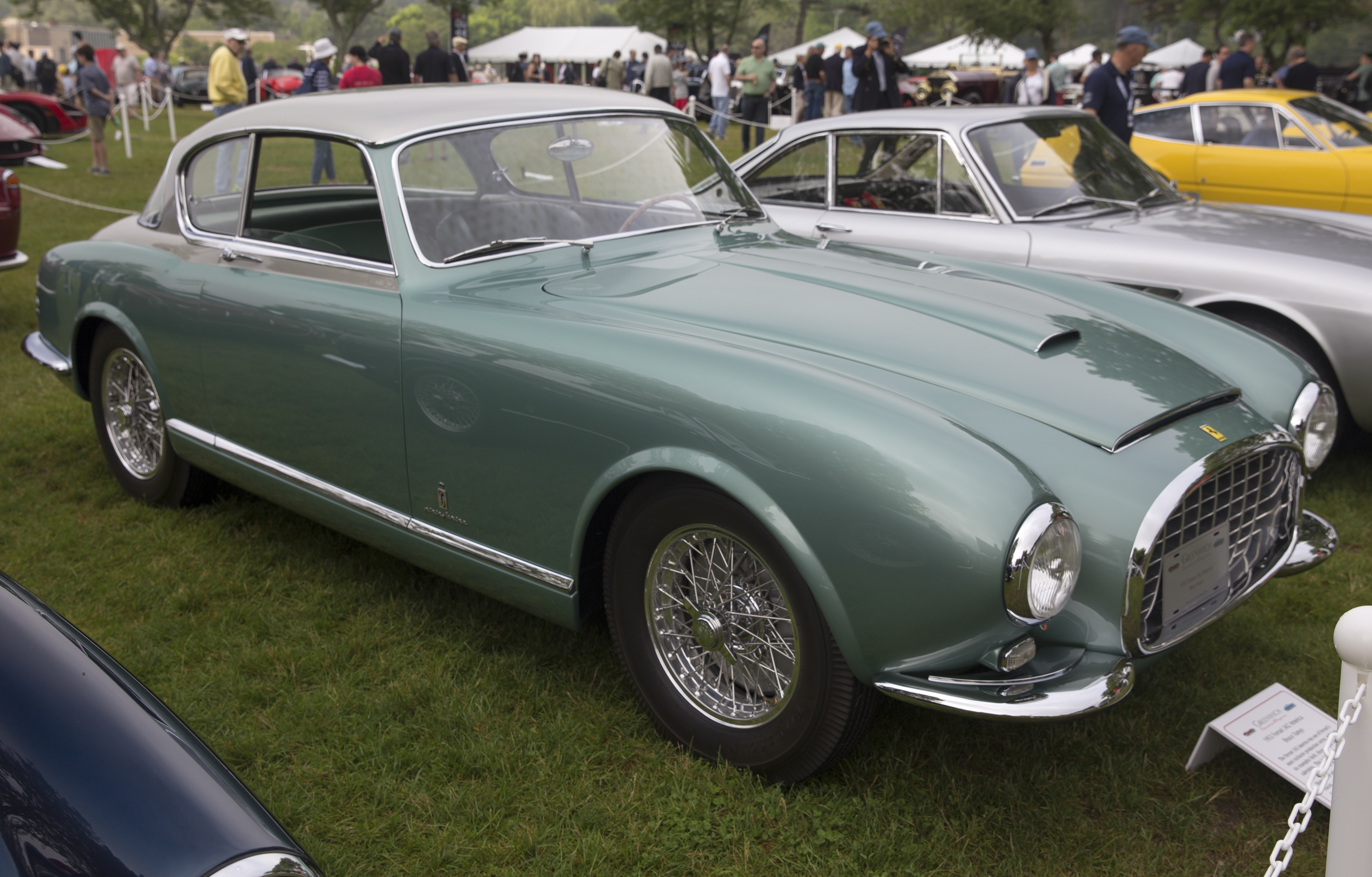
1952 Ferrari 342 America Pinin Farina Coupé

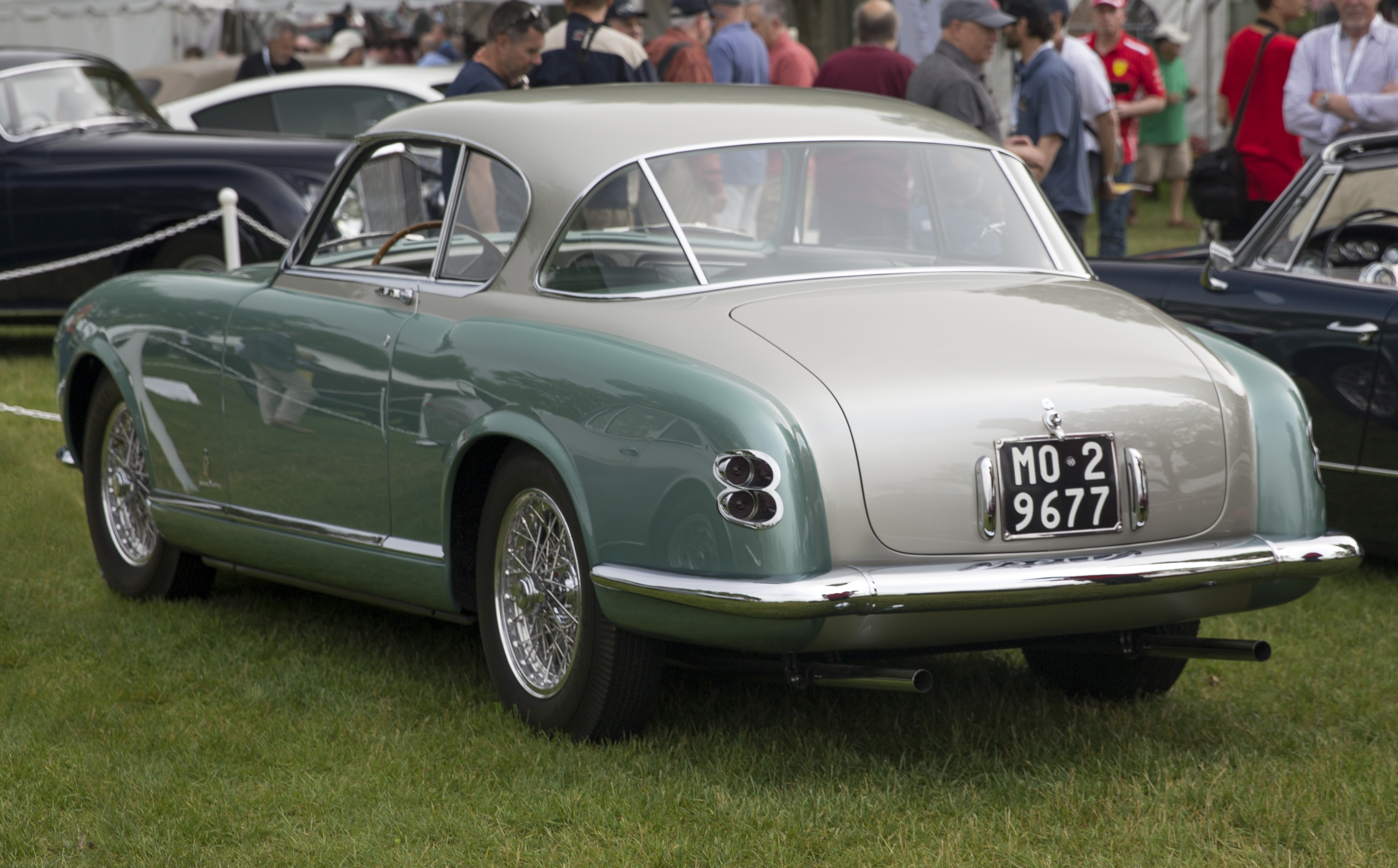
1952 Ferrari 342 America Pinin Farina Coupé (rear)

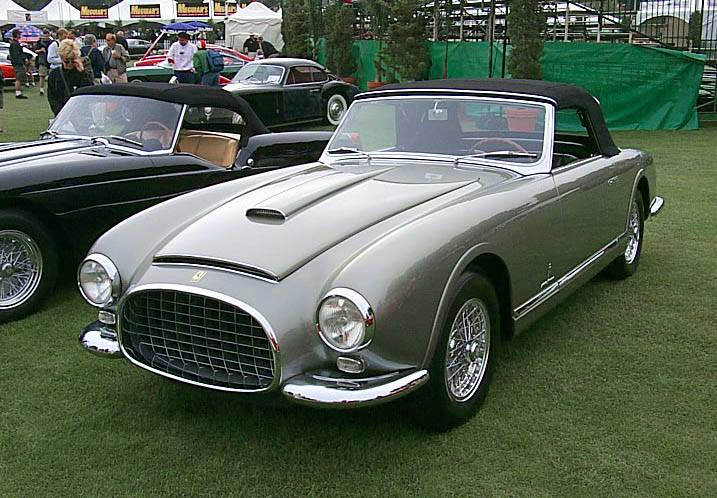
Ferrari 342 America Pinin Farina Cabriolet

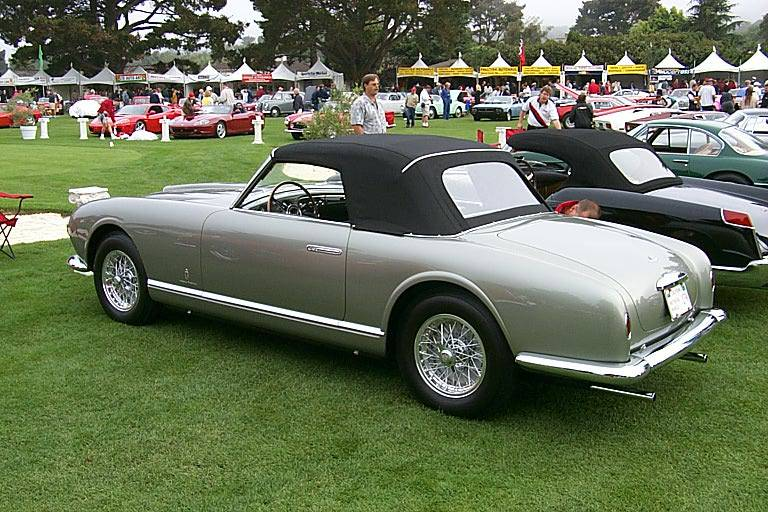
Ferrari 342 America Pinin Farina Cabriolet (rear)

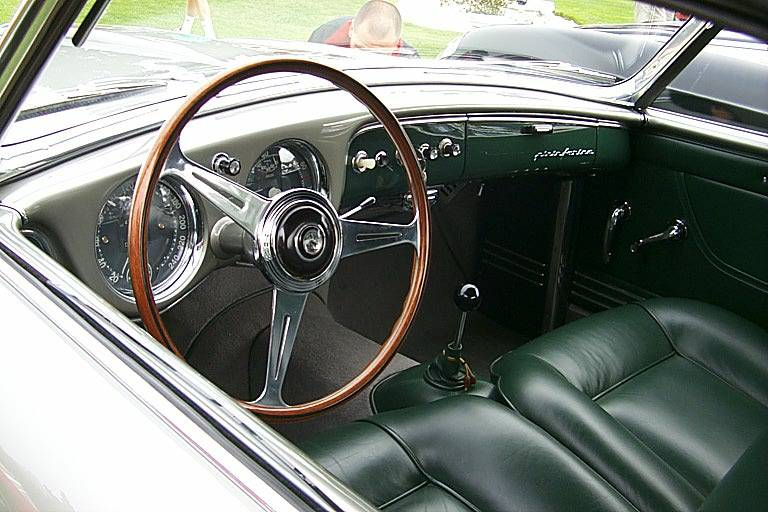
Ferrari 342 America Pinin Farina Cabriolet (interior)

== 375 America ==
Ferrari 375 America
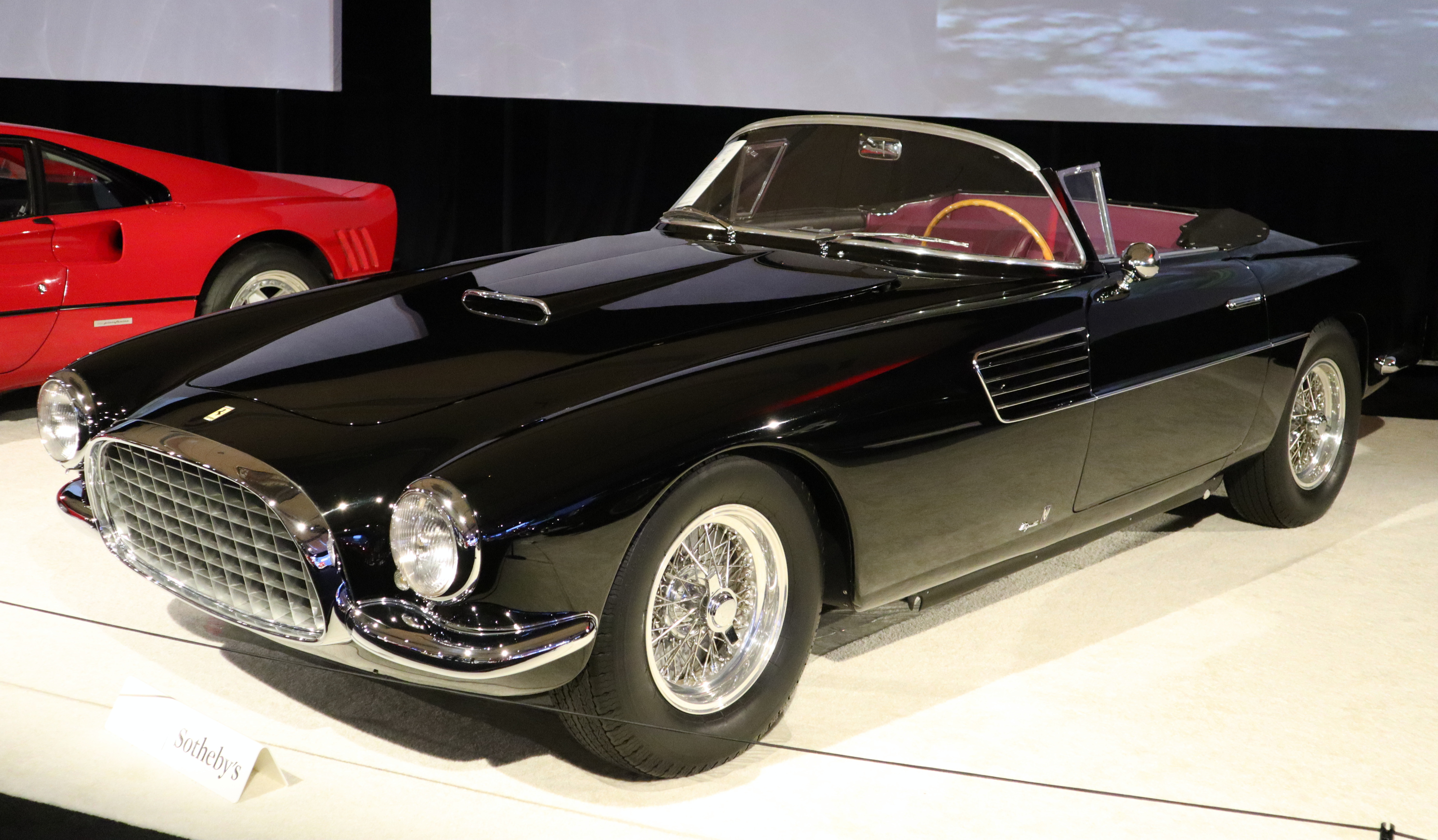
- 1954 Ferrari 375 America Vignale Cabriolet

Overview
- Production: 1953–1954; 12 made (two were converted from 250 Europa)
- Designer: Aldo Brovarone at Pinin Farina; Giovanni Michelotti at Vignale

Body and chassis
- Body style: 2-door coupé 2-door roadster

Powertrain
- Engine: 4,522.08 cc (4.5 L) Tipo 104 Lampredi V12
- Power output: 300 PS (296 hp; 221 kW)
- Transmission: 4-speed manual

Dimensions
- Wheelbase: 2,800 mm (110.2 in)
- Kerb weight: 1,150 kg (2,535 lb)

The 375 America was introduced in 1953 and a Pinin Farina bodied example was shown at that year's Paris Salon. Built as a successor to the 342 America, The 375 used the new 4,522.08 cc (4.5 L) "long block" Lampredi designed V12 engine that was rated at 300 PS (221 kW; 296 hp) at 6,300 rpm, with three Weber 40DCF (or DCZ) carburettors. The stated performance figures were a 0-60 mph (97 km/h) acceleration time in under seven seconds and a top speed of almost 160 mph (257 km/h). The 375 began the tradition of using the off chassis numbers of road cars contrary to its predecessors which used even chassis numbers pertaining to race cars. The expensive and exclusive 375 was only built from late 1953 through 1954 and 12 cars were made, with ten being original 375s and two being 250 Europas that were subsequently converted to 375 specifications (the 250 Europa and the 375 had a nearly identical wheelbase, chassis and mechanicals). The majority of 375s had either three or five-window coupe bodies by Pinin Farina, though Vignale bodied around three Coupés and one convertible.

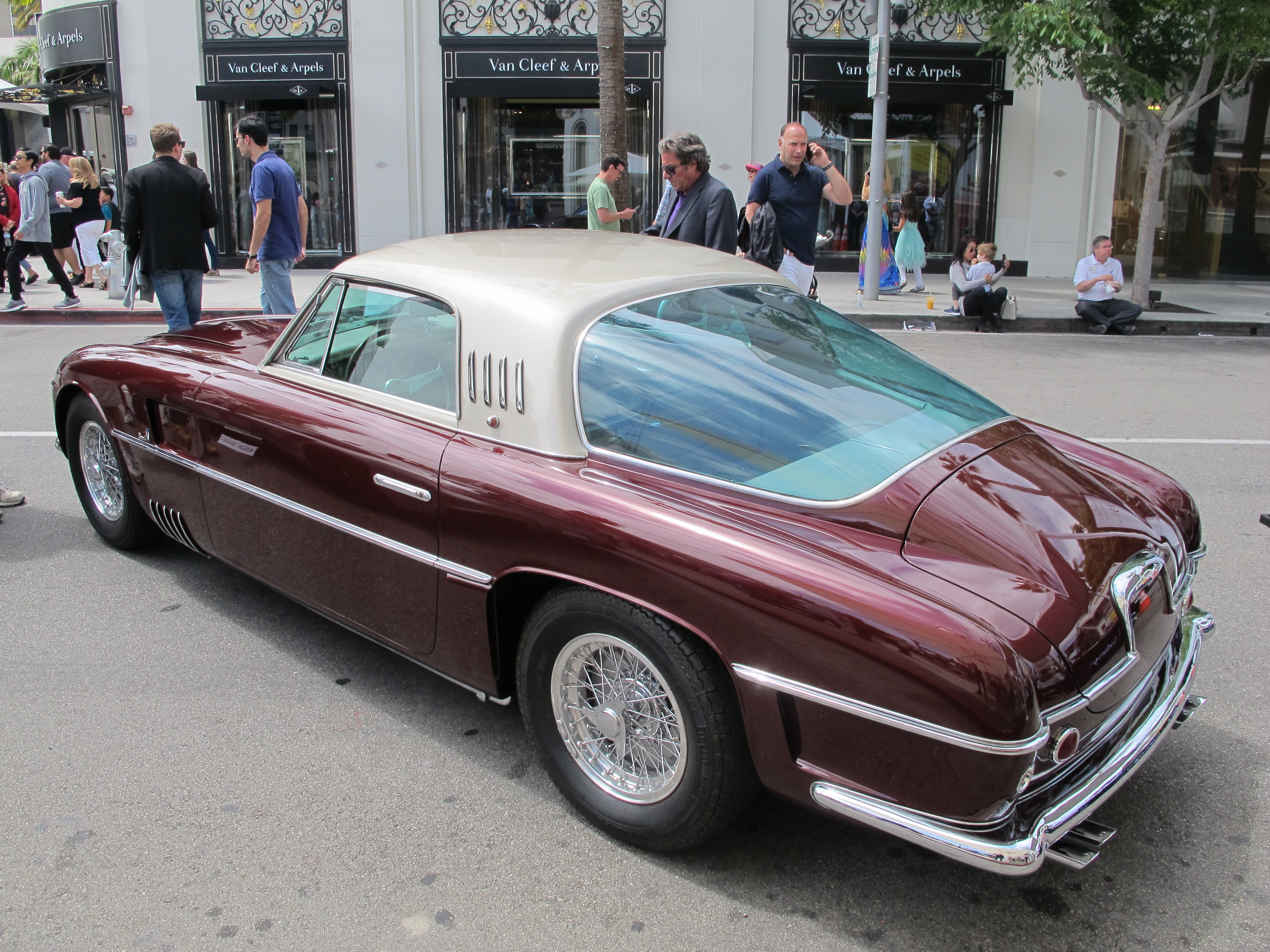
1953 Ferrari 375 America with bodywork by Carrozzeria Vignale

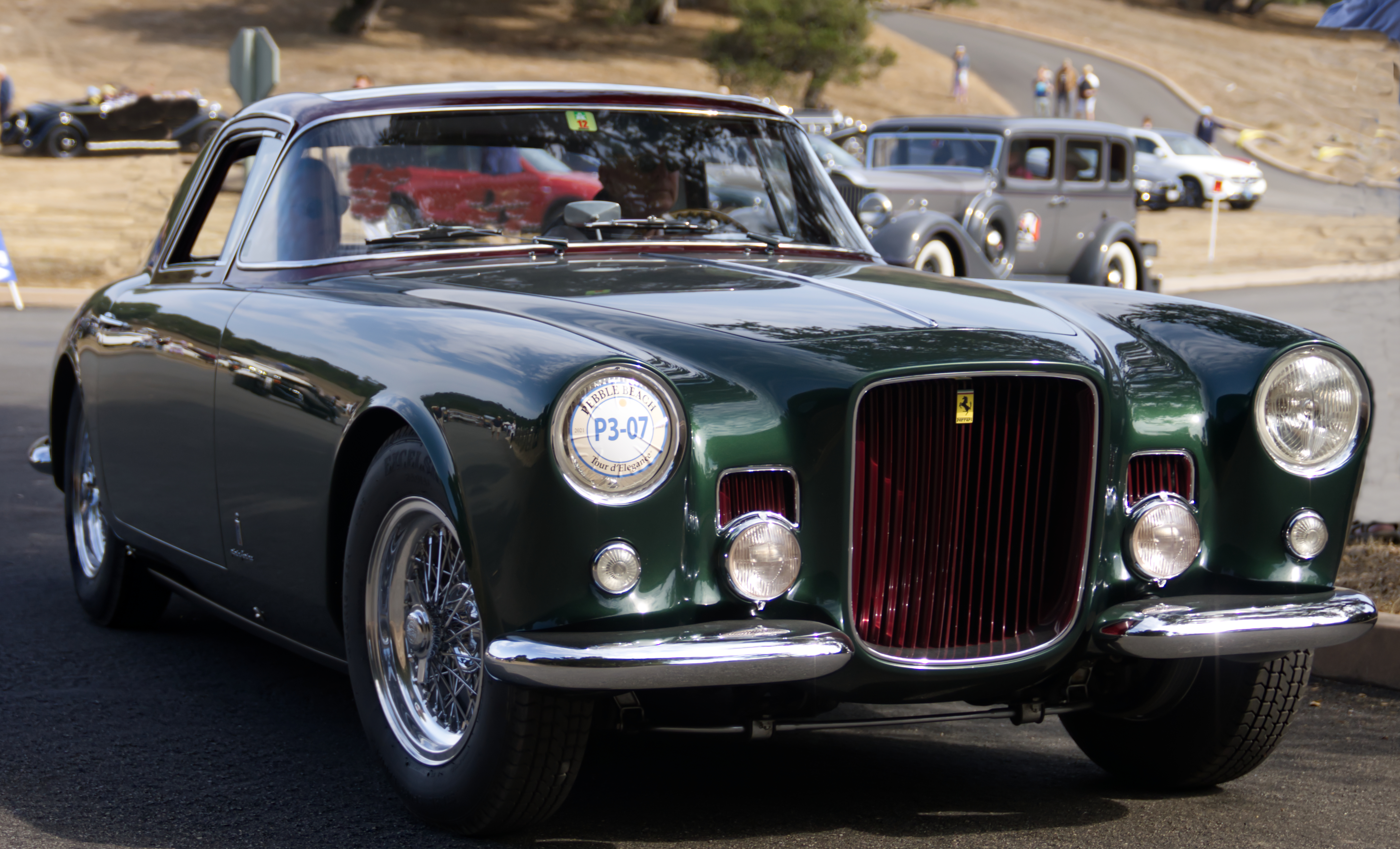
1955 Ferrari 375 America Coupé Speciale built for Gianni Agnelli, designed by Aldo Brovarone at Pinin Farina

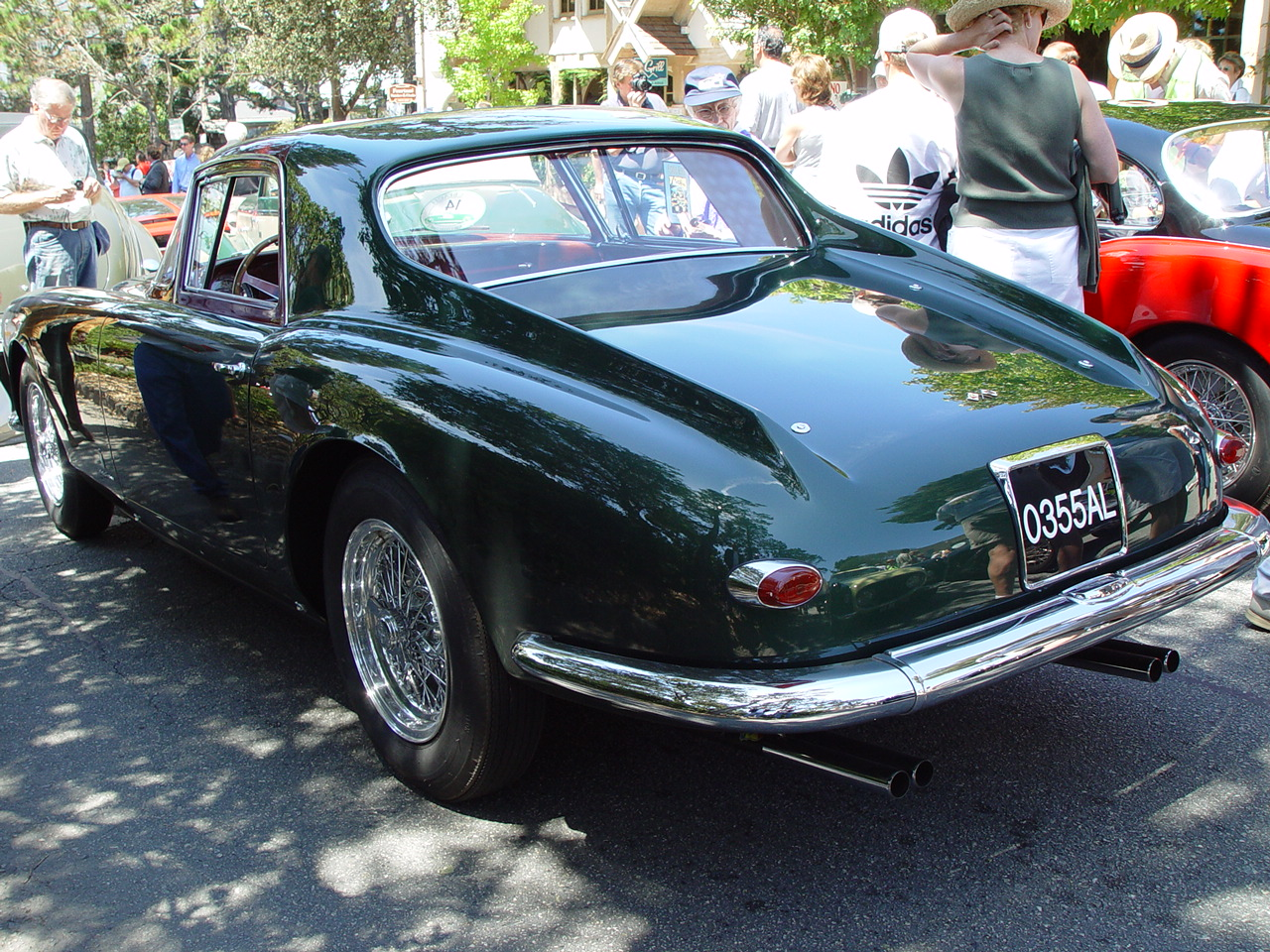
1955 Ferrari 375 America Coupé Speciale (rear view)

== 410 Superamerica ==
Ferrari 410 Superamerica
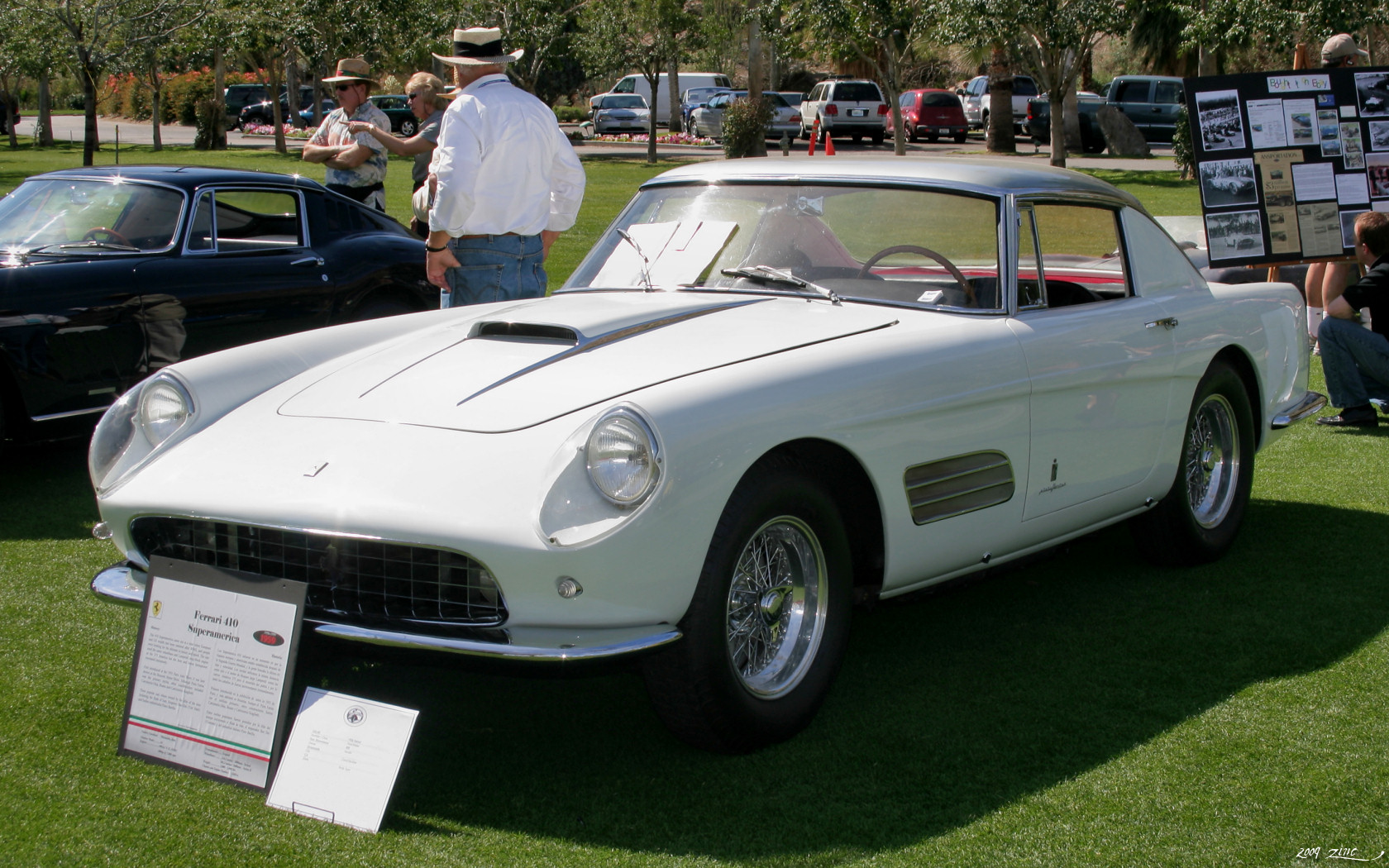
- 1959 410 Superamerica Pinin Farina Coupé

Overview
- Production: 1955–1959; 35 made
- Designer: Pinin Farina

Body and chassis
- Body style: 2-door coupé 2-door roadster
- Related: Ferrari 410 S

Powertrain
- Engine: 4963 cc Tipo 126 Lampredi V12
- Power output: 340–360 PS (335–355 hp; 250–265 kW)
- Transmission: 5-speed manual

Dimensions
- Wheelbase: 2,600–2,800 mm (102.4–110.2 in)
- Kerb weight: 1,200 kg (2,646 lb)

The 410 Superamerica was introduced in 1955 and used the engine based on a single plug 410 S powerplant. The engine had an increased displacement up to 5.0 litres (4,962.96 cc) and was rated at 340 PS (250 kW; 335 hp) at 6,000 rpm thanks to three Weber 40DCF carburettors. The 410 Superamerica had a new chassis, featuring independent coil spring front suspension and was the first Ferrari road car to use a five speed gearbox. The car had a listed top speed of 262 km/h (163 mph) and was recognised by the Guinness Book of Records as the world's fastest production car. In 1957, the carburetors were upgraded for Weber 46DCF3 units which resulted in an increased power output of 360 PS (265 kW; 355 hp). This uprated engine was fitted to the Series III 410 Superamerica and marked the final development for the 'long-block' Lampredi V12.

Each 410 Superamerica had custom bodywork, with a few by Boano and Ghia but most by Ferrari stalwart, Pinin Farina. The price was extremely high—at US$16,800, the 410 Superamerica offered at the New York Auto Show by importer Luigi Chinetti was more than twice as expensive as the Mercedes-Benz 300SL "Gullwing" exhibited by Max Hoffman. Due to its high price tag, the car was a sales disappointment. Just 35 units were built when production ended in 1959. The first two series of Pinin Farina coupés were very similar, with only the third series radically redesigned, with non-panoramic rear window, different side-line, lower front grille and more recessed headlights with the headlights in some cars being covered. While the Series III, introduced in 1959, had three louvres behind side-windows, some have this space covered with glass.

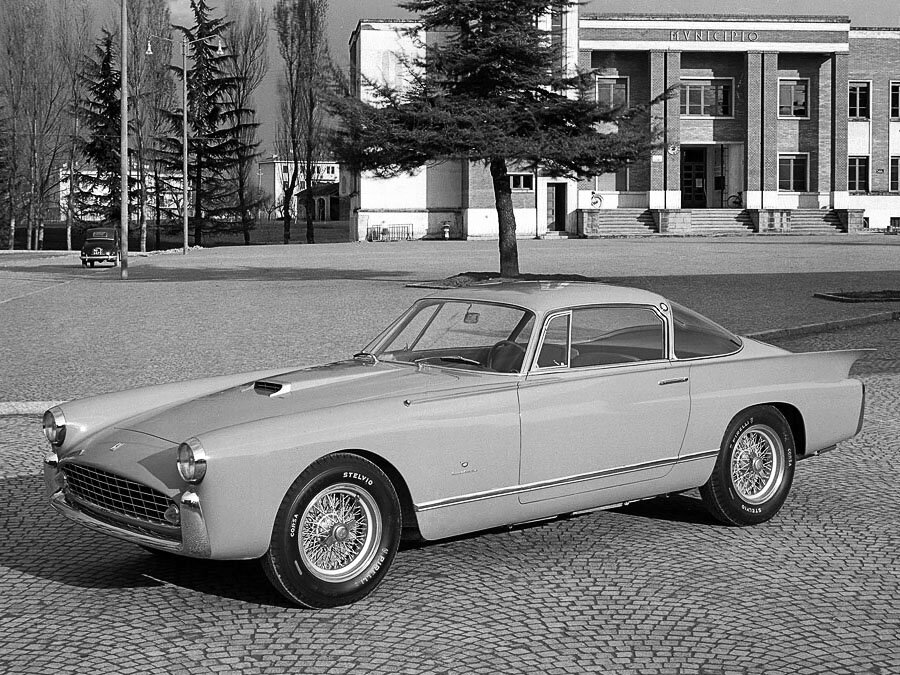
Ferrari 410 Superamerica by Boano s/n 0477SA

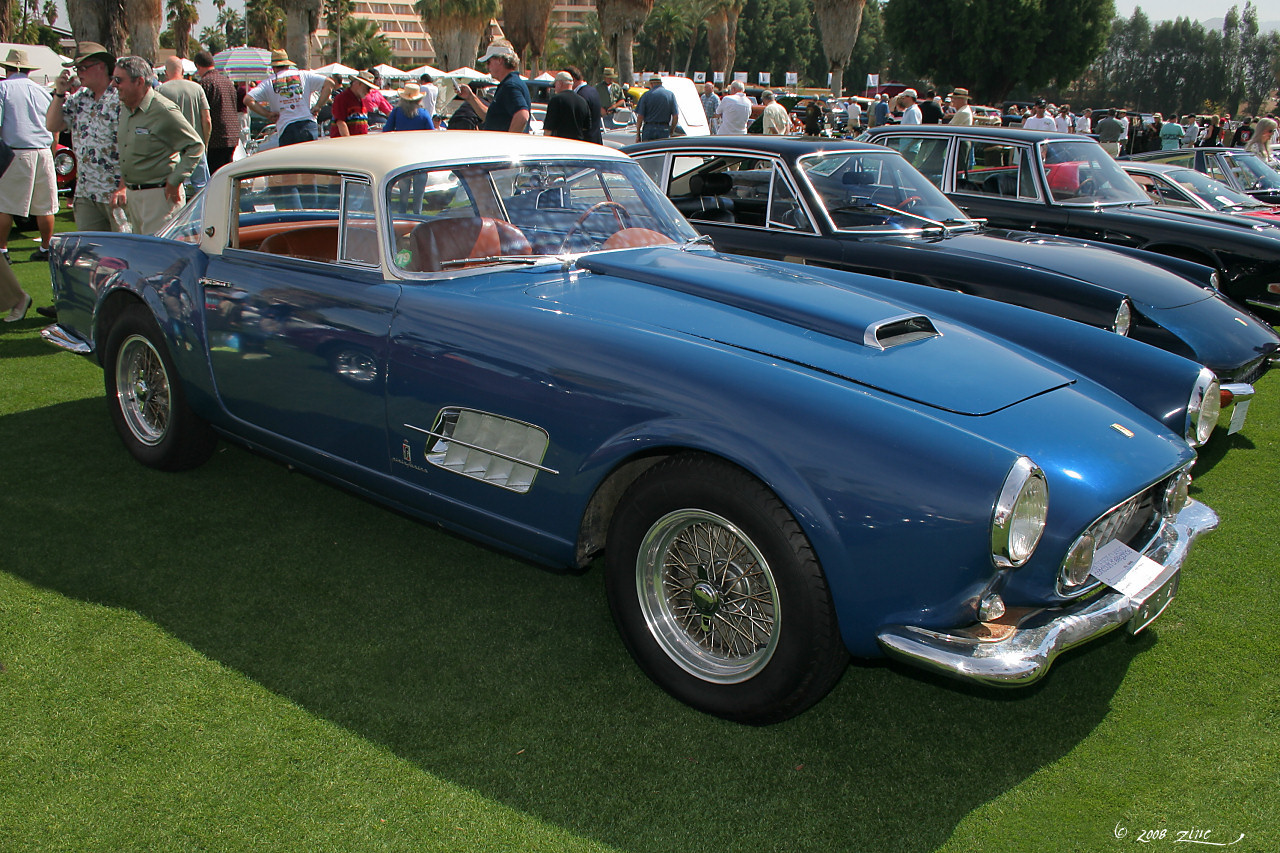
Ferrari 410 Superamerica Series I by Pinin Farina

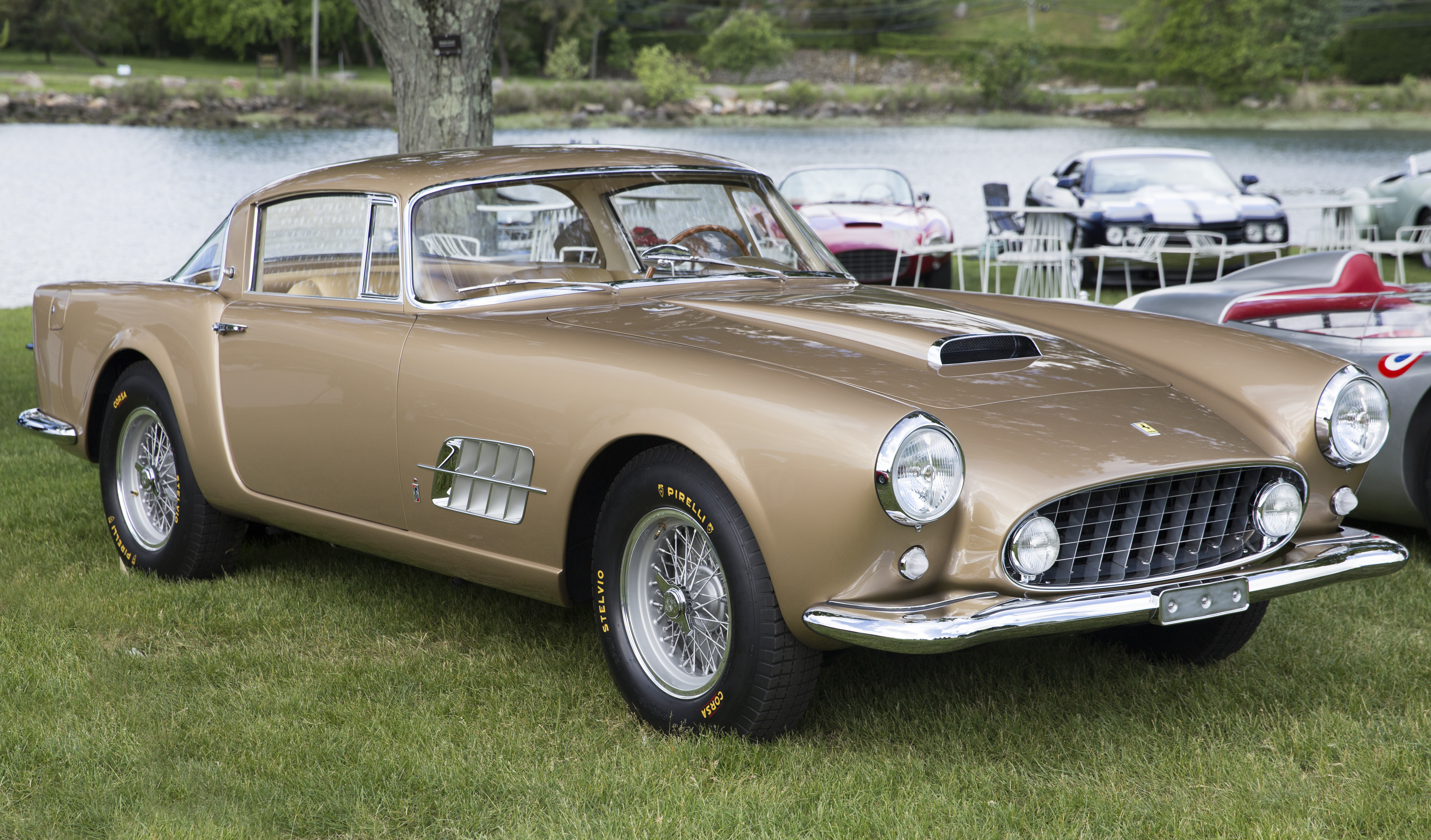
Ferrari 410 Superamerica Series I by Pinin Farina, the NY show car

=== 410 Superfast Ghia "Gilda" ===
Ferrari 410 Superfast by Ghia

The 1955 410 Superamerica received a one-off bodywork by Carrozzeria Ghia. Inspired by Lincoln Gilda Streamline X show car and incorporating prominent rear fins and panoramic front windshield. Design is credited to Giovanni Savonuzzi.

=== 410 Superfast Pinin Farina Speciale ===
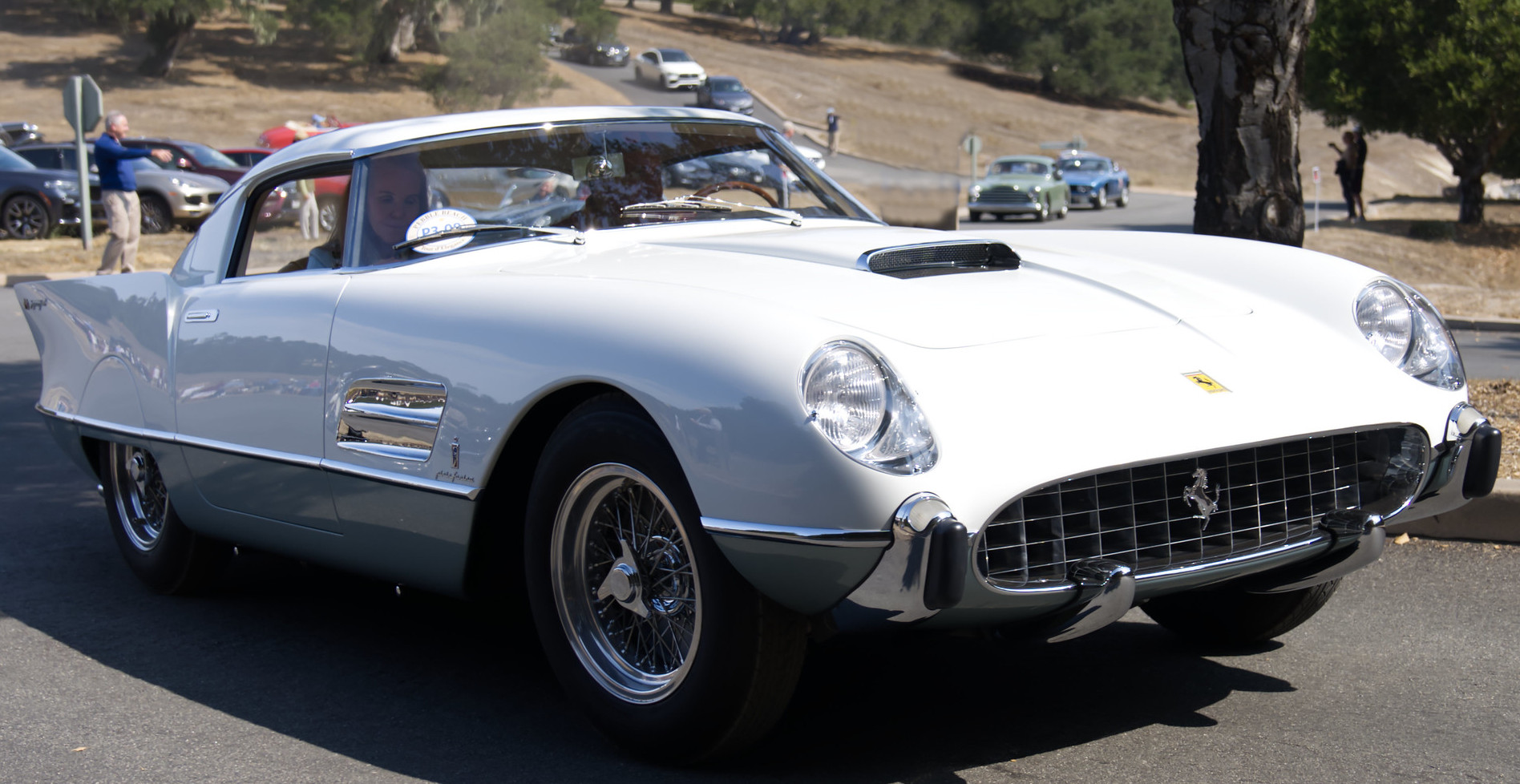
Ferrari 410 Superfast by Pinin Farina

The 410 Superfast was also known as "Superfast I" and was based on the on 410 Superamerica chassis but fitted with the 24-plug racing engine from the 410 S, prominent tailfins, and bi-coloured body. It was unveiled at the 1956 Paris Auto Show. The car had a shorter wheelbase of 2,600 mm (102.4 in).

=== 4.9 Superfast ===
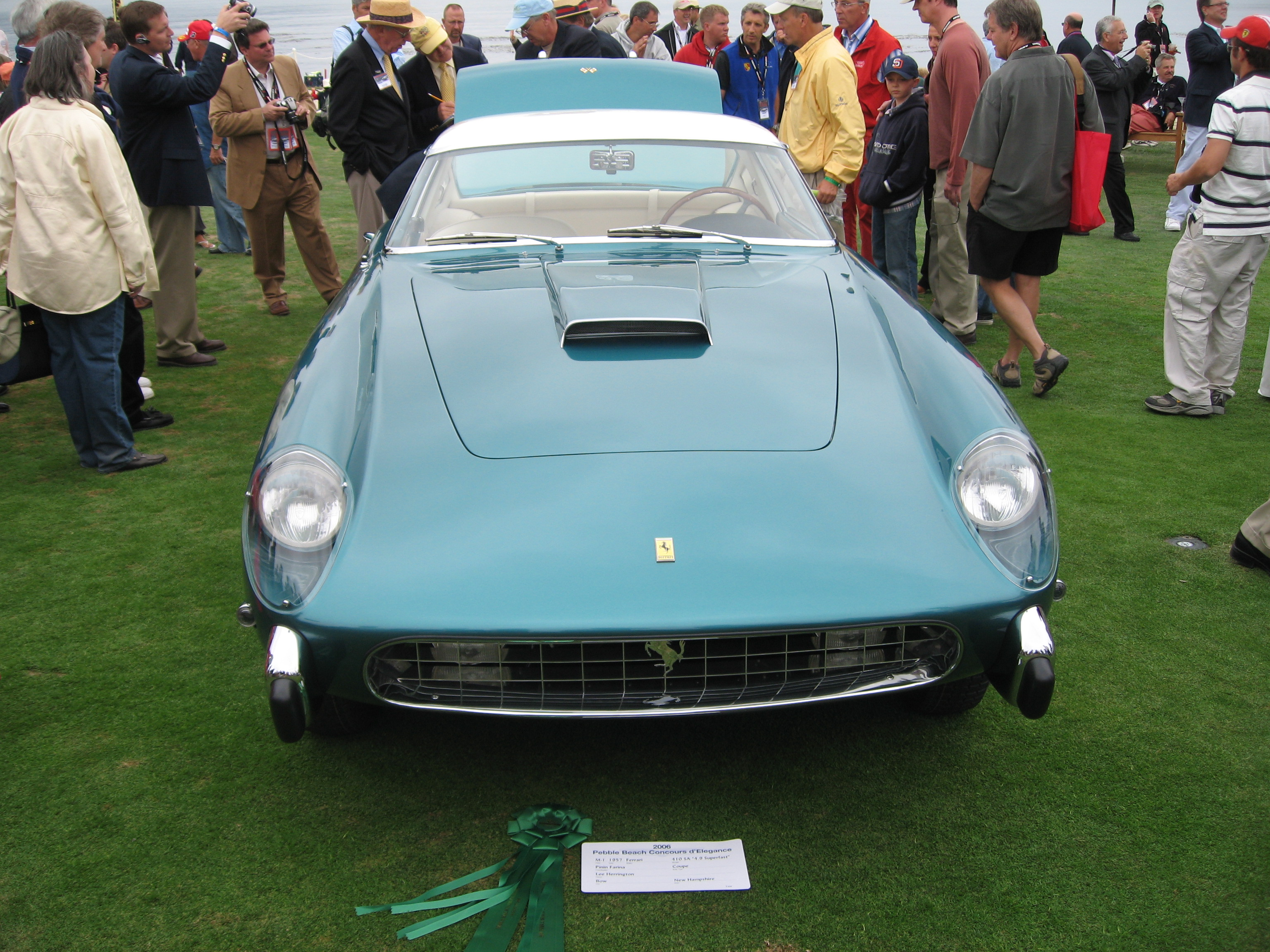
Ferrari 4.9 Superfast by Pinin Farina

The 4.9 Superfast was a one-off based on the 410 Superamerica chassis and engine. Presented in Paris in 1957, this car was an evolution of 410 Superfast but without the prominent rear fins. Also the colours were similar but with dark blue-green full body and white roof.

== 400 Superamerica ==
Ferrari 400 Superamerica
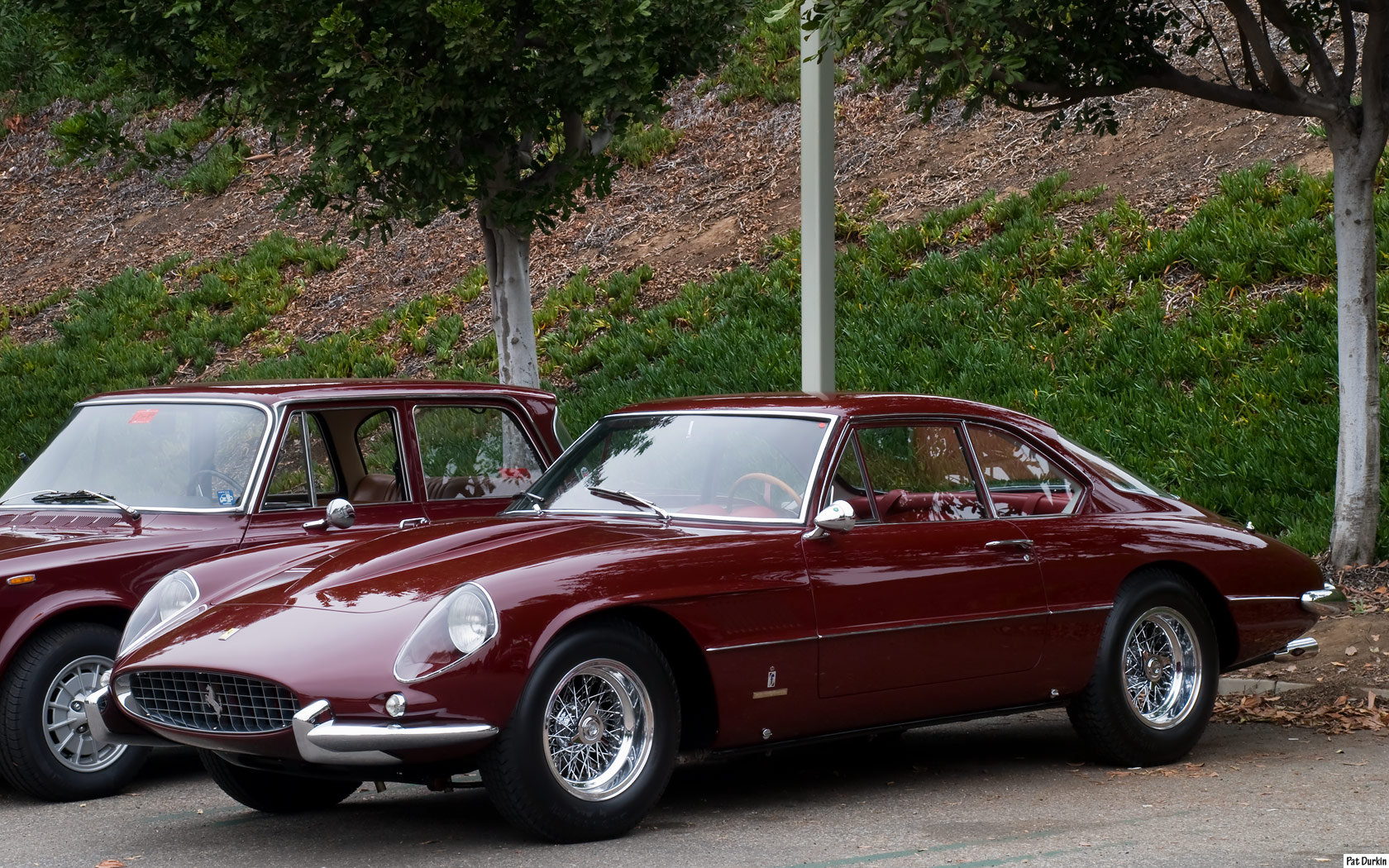
- Series II Ferrari 400 Superamerica LWB Coupé

Overview
- Production: 1959–1964; 47 made
- Designer: Aldo Brovarone at Pinin Farina (Coupé Aerodinamico)

Body and chassis
- Body style: 2-door coupé 2-door roadster

Powertrain
- Engine: 3,967.44 cc (4.0 L) Tipo 163 Colombo V12
- Power output: 340 PS (335 hp; 250 kW)
- Transmission: 4-speed manual with overdrive

Dimensions
- Wheelbase: 2,420 mm (95.3 in)(series I); 2,600 mm (102.4 in)(series II)
- Kerb weight: 1,250 kg (2,756 lb) (dry, coupé)

The 400 Superamerica debuted in 1959 as the production of the 410 ended, and was available as a coupe, spider, or cabriolet with custom Pinin Farina bodywork. It had the smaller 3,967.44 cc (4.0 L) Colombo engine, which had similar power output as its predecessor at 340 PS (250 kW; 335 hp) at 7,000 rpm. Four-wheel disc brakes were a new addition. 47 units of the 400 Superamerica been built in two series of which 32 were the coupé aerodinamico variant. The Series I coupés aerodinamico had open hood air scoop while series II cars had covered scoop and slightly longer wheelbase. Production of the 400 Superamerica ended in 1964.

=== 400 Superamerica Pinin Farina Coupé Speciale ===
A special one-off version of the 400 Superamerica, s/n 1517SA, was built in 1959 for Gianni Agnelli. This car was also the very first of the 400 Superamericas. A very similar body with its characteristic square grille, was used on Maserati 5000 GT that was also built for Agnelli.

=== 400 Superamerica Superfast II–IV ===
Originally built as a Series I Ferrari 400 Superamerica Aerodinamico Pinin Farina Coupé, chassis no. 2207SA, was re-bodied and presented as Superfast II at the Torino Motor Show in 1960 and 1961. It was used by Battista "Pinin" Farina as his personal car. In 1961, the car was re-bodied into the Superfast III and presented at 1962 Geneva Motor Show and went through another final redesign final as the Superfast IV. It was a styling concept for the upcoming 500 Superfast model. Currently this show car can be seen on various events with its first styling.

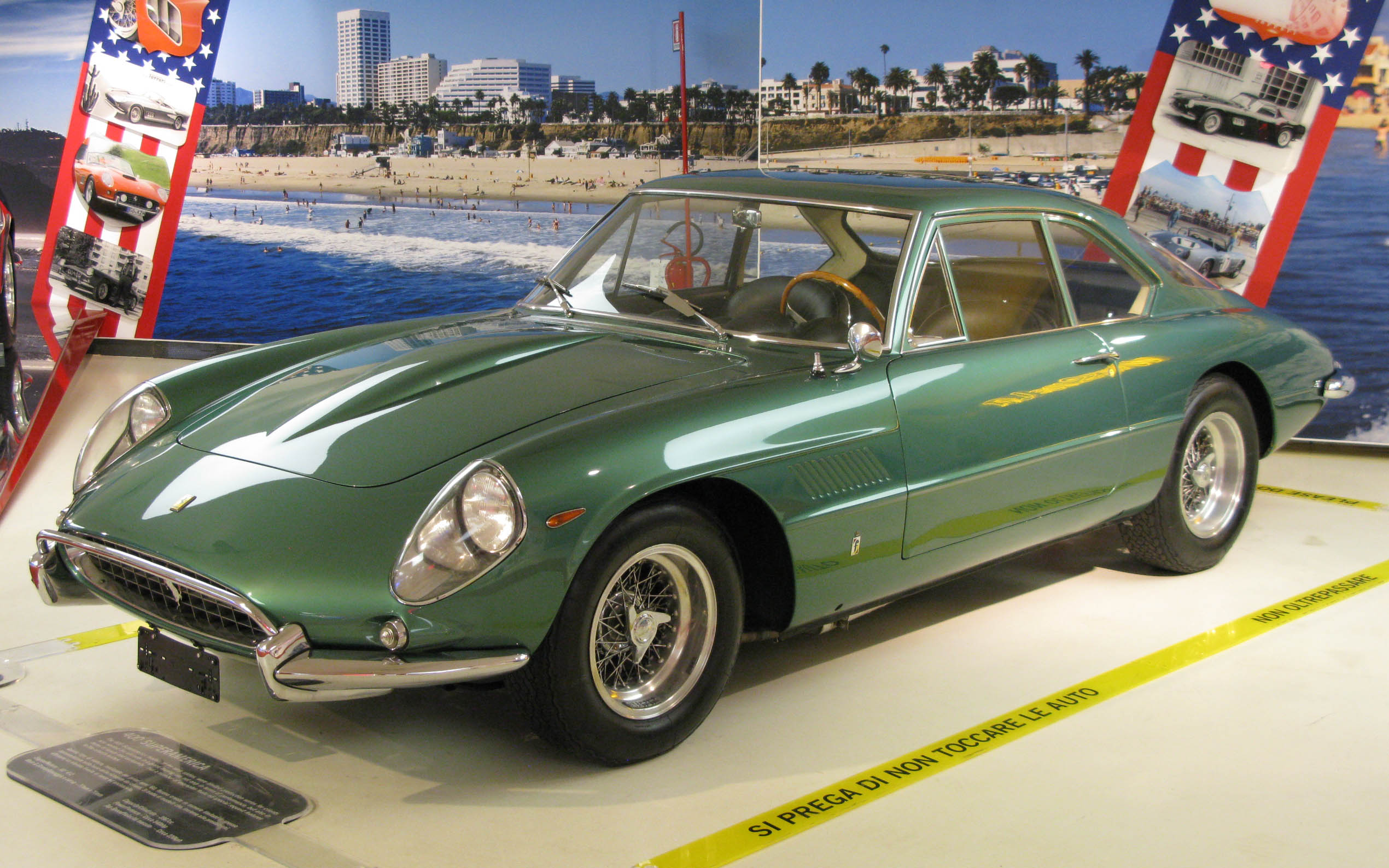
Ferrari 400 Superamerica Series II by Pinin Farina

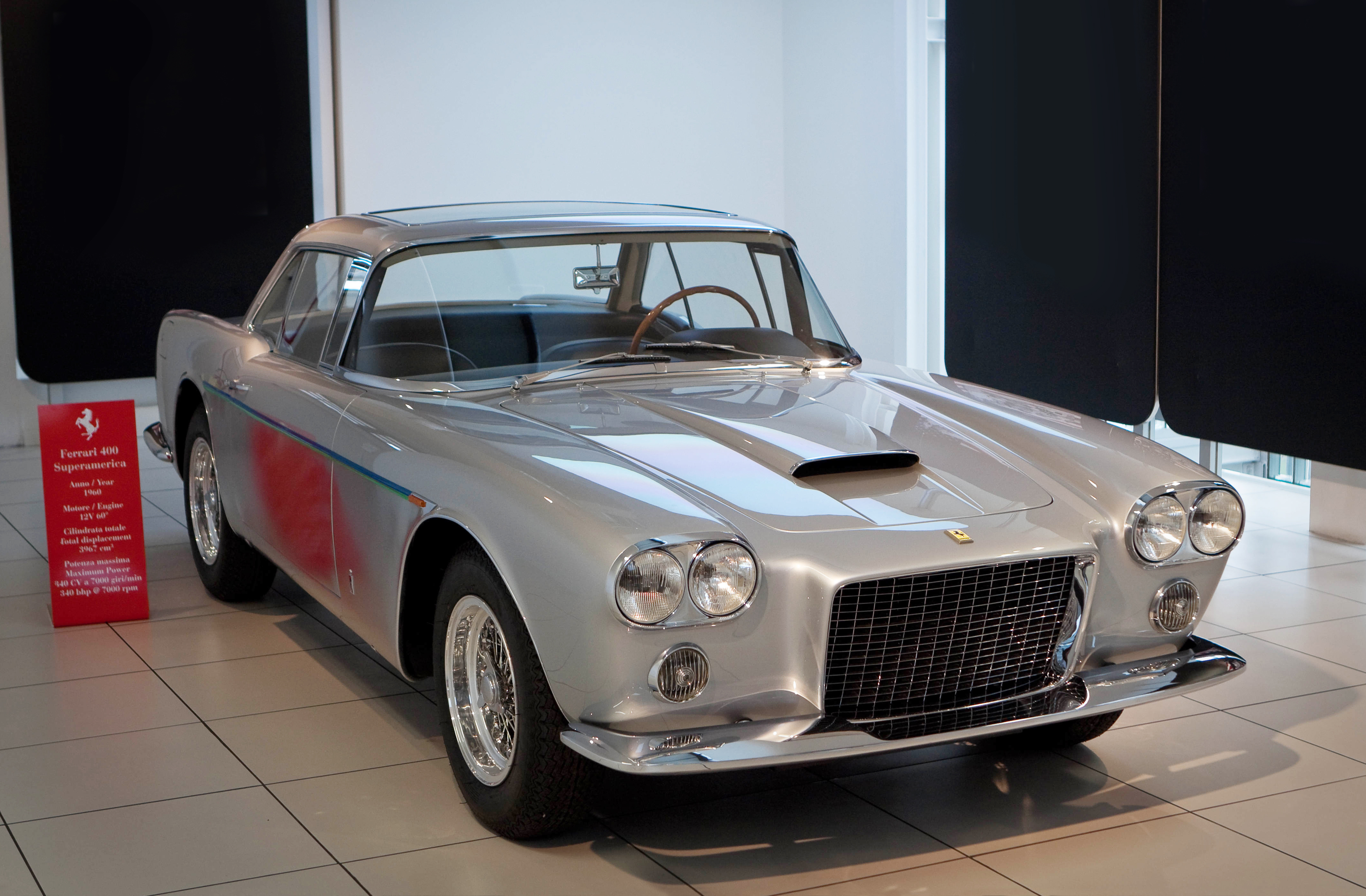
Ferrari 400 Superamerica Coupé Speciale by Pinin Farina for Gianni Agnelli

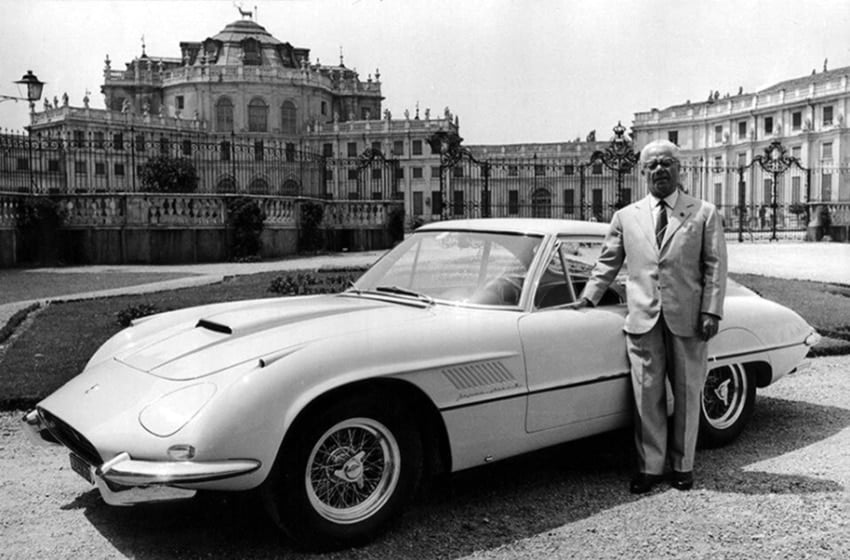
Battista Farina with a Ferrari Superfast II

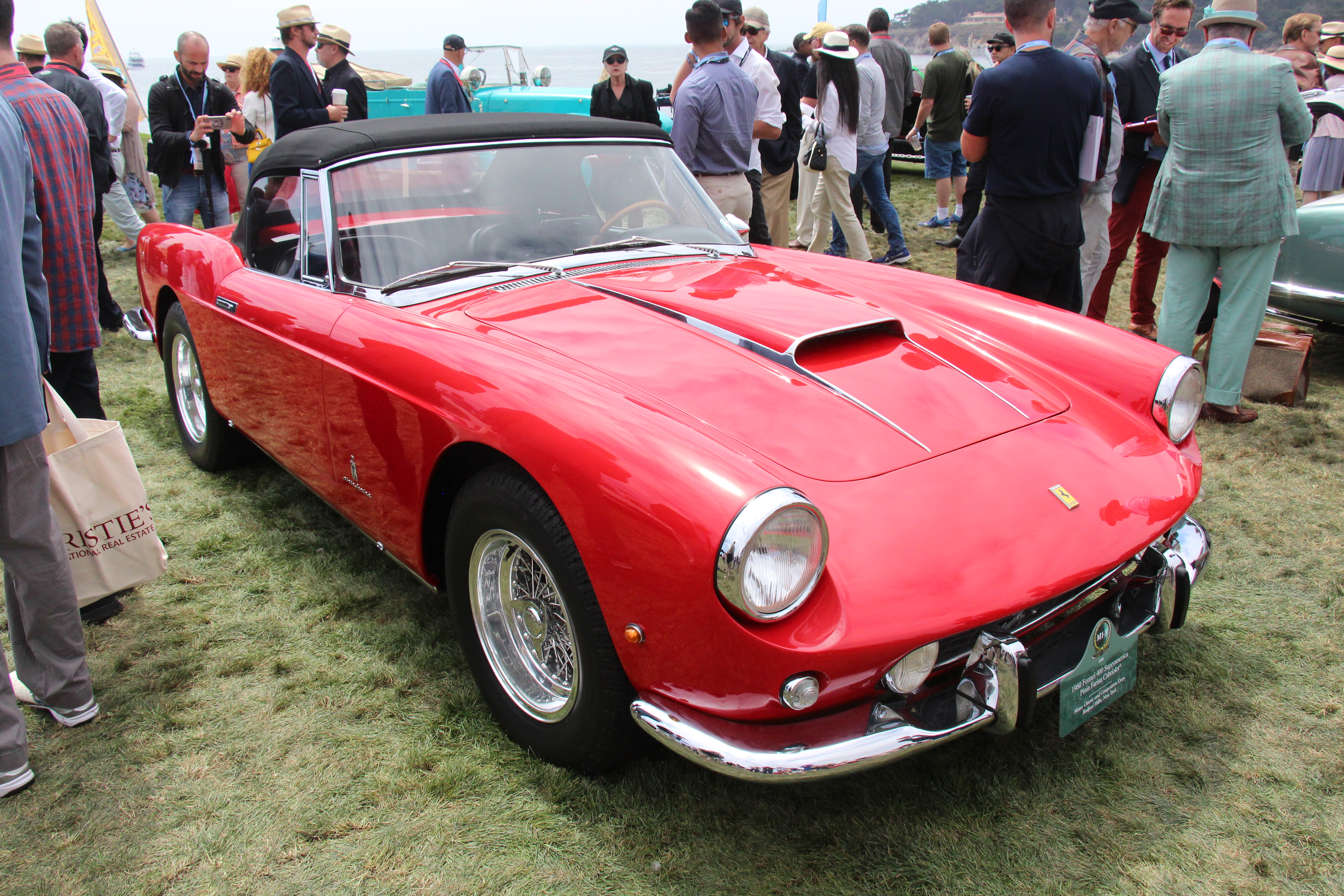
Ferrari 400 Superamerica Cabriolet by Pinin Farina

== 500 Superfast ==
Ferrari 500 Superfast
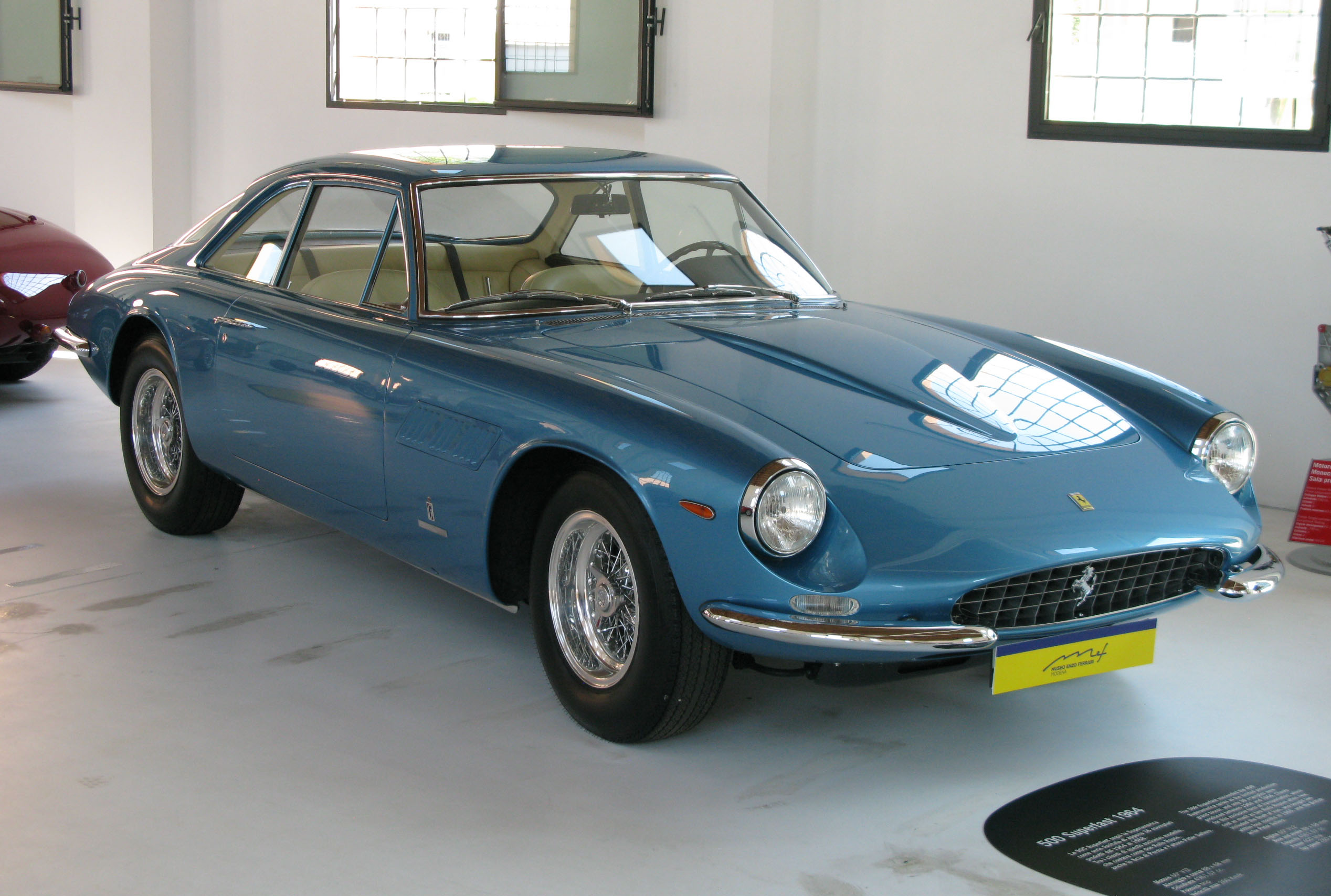

Overview
- Production: 1964–1966; 36 produced
- Designer: Aldo Brovarone at Pininfarina

Body and chassis
- Body style: 2-door coupé
- Related: Ferrari 330

Powertrain
- Engine: 4,962.96 cc (5.0 L) Tipo 208 Colombo V12
- Power output: 400 PS (395 hp; 294 kW)
- Transmission: 4-speed manual with overdrive 5-speed manual

Dimensions
- Wheelbase: 2,650 mm (104.3 in)
- Length: 4,820 mm (189.8 in)
- Width: 1,730 mm (68.1 in)
- Height: 1,280 mm (50.4 in)
- Kerb weight: 1,400 kg (3,086 lb)

The final model in the flagship America series was the 500 Superfast, first unveiled at the 1964 Geneva Motor Show. During development these cars were to be called "Superamerica", but the decision was made at the last moment to use "Superfast" instead.

The engine was a unique 4,962.96 cc (5 L) Ferrari Colombo V12 engine, which had the same 108 mm bore center dimensions as the Lampredi "long-block" engines of the 410 Superamerica, otherwise the design was based on the original Colombo "short block". Breathing through six twin-choke Weber 40DCZ/6 carburettors, the V12 produced up to 400 PS (294 kW; 395 hp) at 6,500 rpm and could push the car to 280 kilometres per hour (174 mph). The chassis was very similar in construction to the contemporary 330 GT 2+2, and bodywork was now done by Pininfarina, with the cars being assembled in Turin. When leaving the factory the 500 Superfast originally fitted Pirelli Cinturato CN72 205 VR15 tyres. Depending on options, each car took 4 to 6 months to complete.

36 cars were made from 1964 to 1966, including 12 improved Series II models with a 5-speed transmission in place of the earlier 4-speed plus overdrive. The Series II cars can be recognized by having a triple louvre exhaust vent behind the front wheels, rather than the earlier 11-slot grilles. Unlike its predecessors, the 500 Superfast was only produced in the 2+2 coupe body style. The production total excludes a one-off 330 GT 2+2 produced with a Superfast-style body for Prince Bernhard of The Netherlands. This one-off was sold at the Bonhams' December 2003 Geneva auction for CHF 422,100 including premium. Famous owners of the car include Prince Karim Aga Khan who bought the first 500 Superfast and the Shah of Iran who owned two.

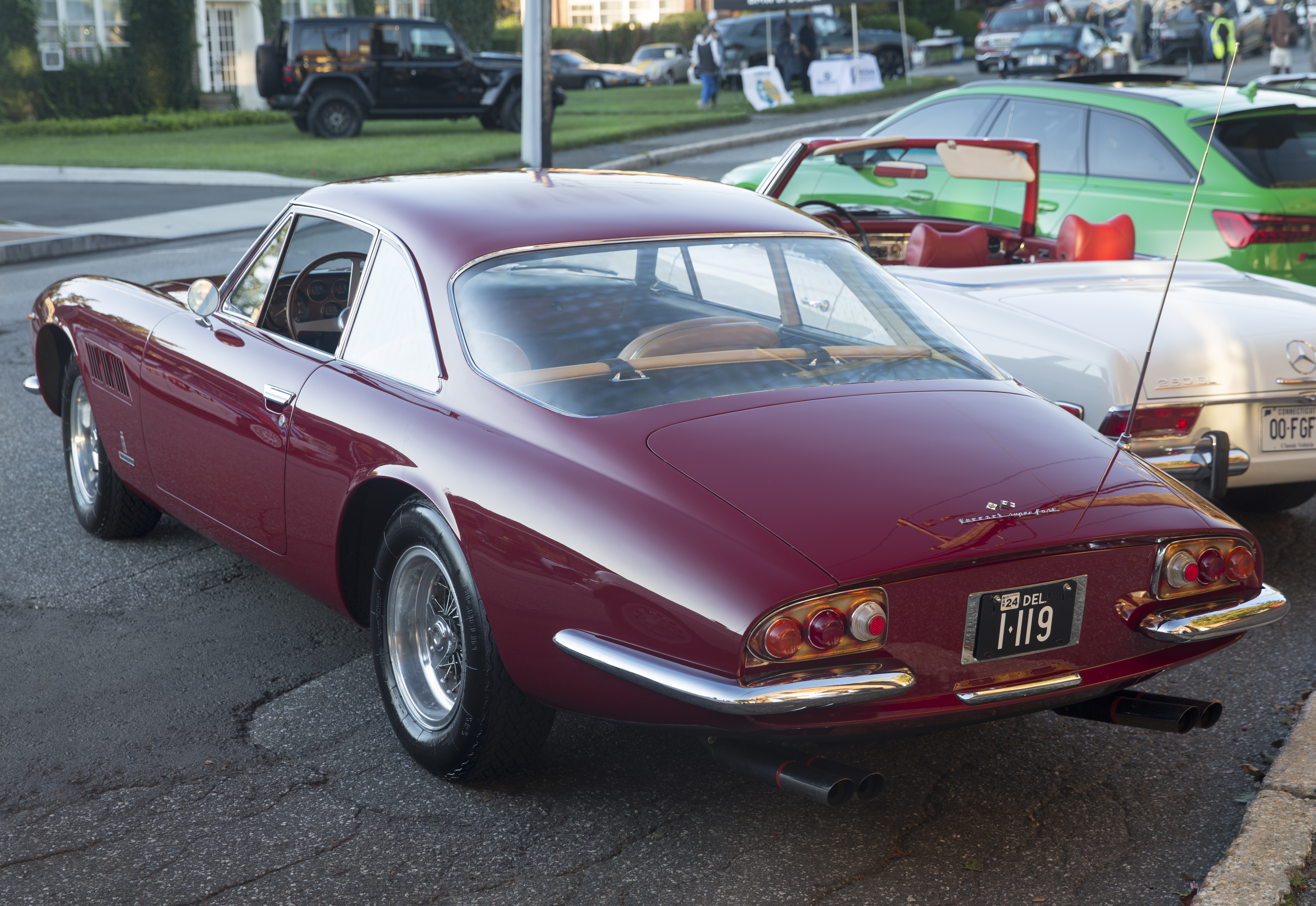
Ferrari 500 Superfast (Series I; s/n 5983SF)

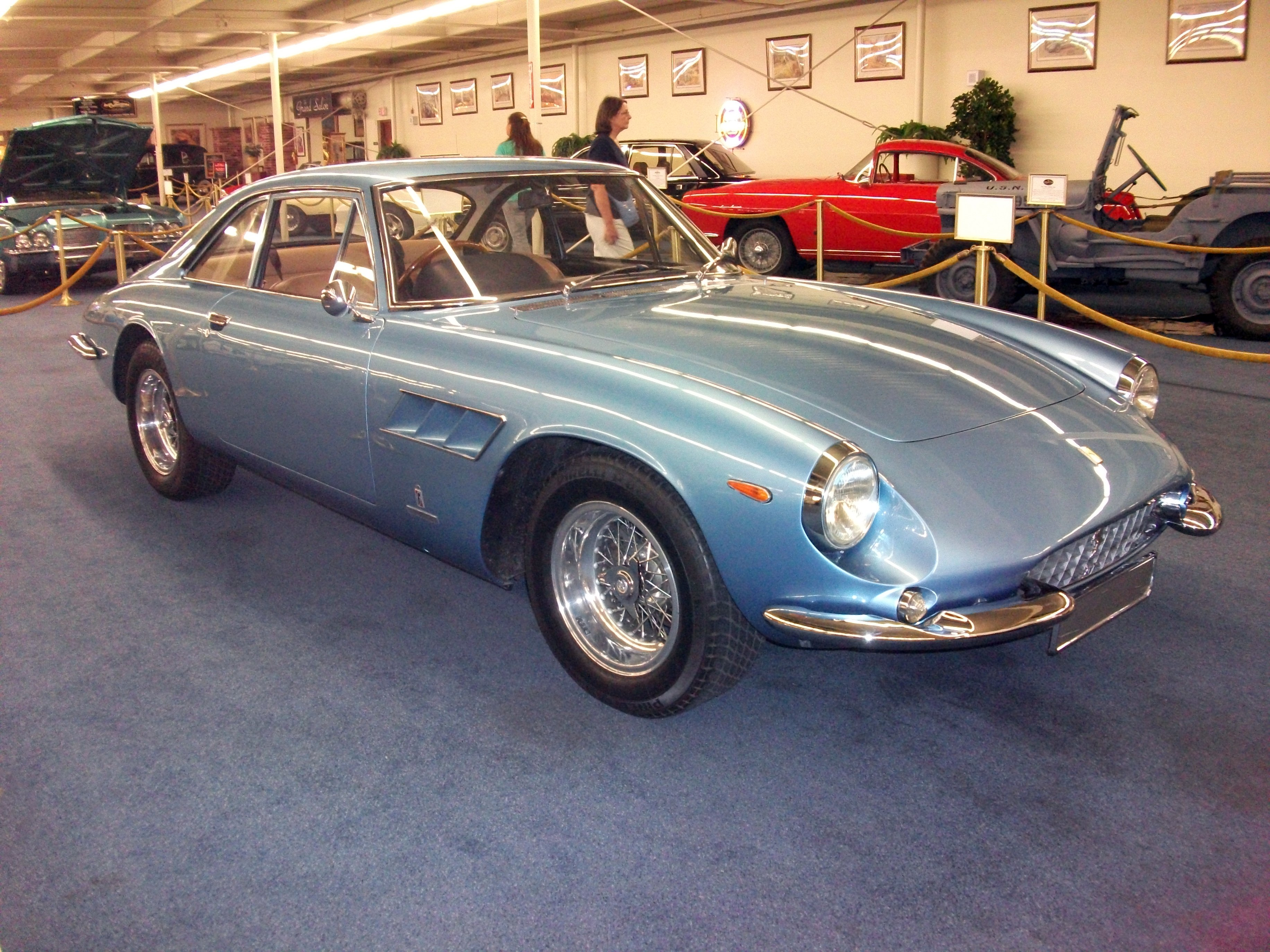
1967 Ferrari 500 Superfast (Series II; s/n 8459S)

== 365 California ==
Ferrari 365 California
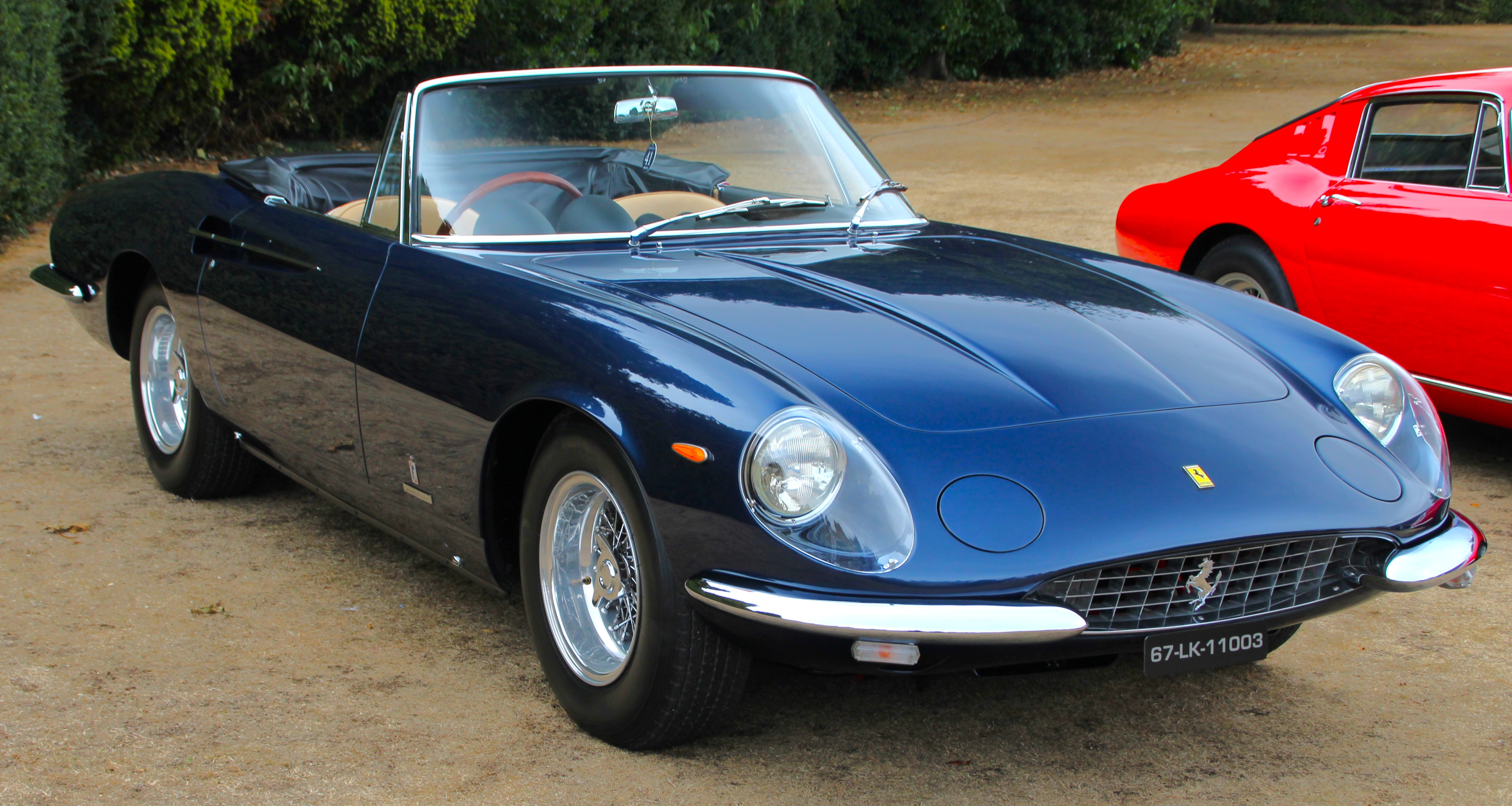

Overview
- Production: 1966–1967; 14 produced
- Designer: Tom Tjaarda at Pininfarina

Body and chassis
- Body style: 2+2 convertible
- Related: Ferrari 330

Powertrain
- Engine: 4,390 cc (4.4 L) Tipo 217B Colombo V12
- Power output: 320 PS (316 hp; 235 kW)
- Transmission: 5-speed manual

Dimensions
- Wheelbase: 2,650 mm (104.3 in)
- Length: 4,900 mm (192.9 in)
- Width: 1,780 mm (70.1 in)
- Height: 1,330 mm (52.4 in)
- Kerb weight: 1,320 kg (2,910 lb) (dry)

The 365 California replaced the 500 Superfast in 1966 and was built on the same ethos as the 250GT Spyder. It was the first model in the 365 series of cars, with its 4,390 cc (268 cu in) V12 based on the 330's 4.0 L Colombo unit but with an 81 mm bore. The 365 California used the same chassis as the 500 Superfast but with an evolutionary cabriolet body by Pininfarina. Debuting at the Geneva Motor Show in 1966, just 14 examples were produced (including 2 in right hand drive) before production ended in 1967. Whilst the prototype was built on a 330 GT 2+2 type 571 chassis, production cars featured the type 598 chassis. The chassis were sent to Pininfarina's Grugliasco plant to be bodied and trimmed and were then returned to Ferrari for fitment of the mechanical components. Desirable performance components like power steering and Borrani wire wheels were standard-equipment on the 365 California.

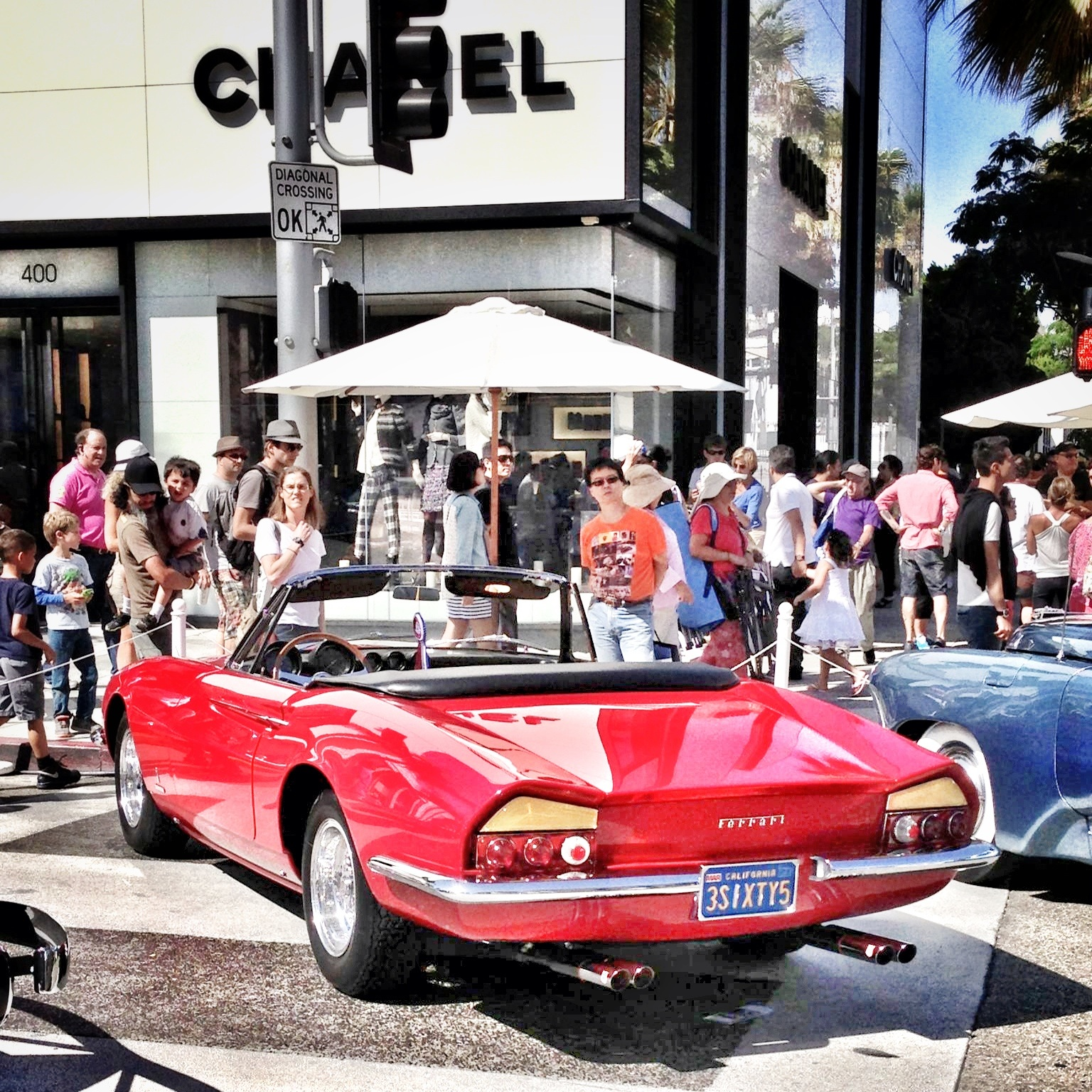
Ferrari 365 California (rear view)

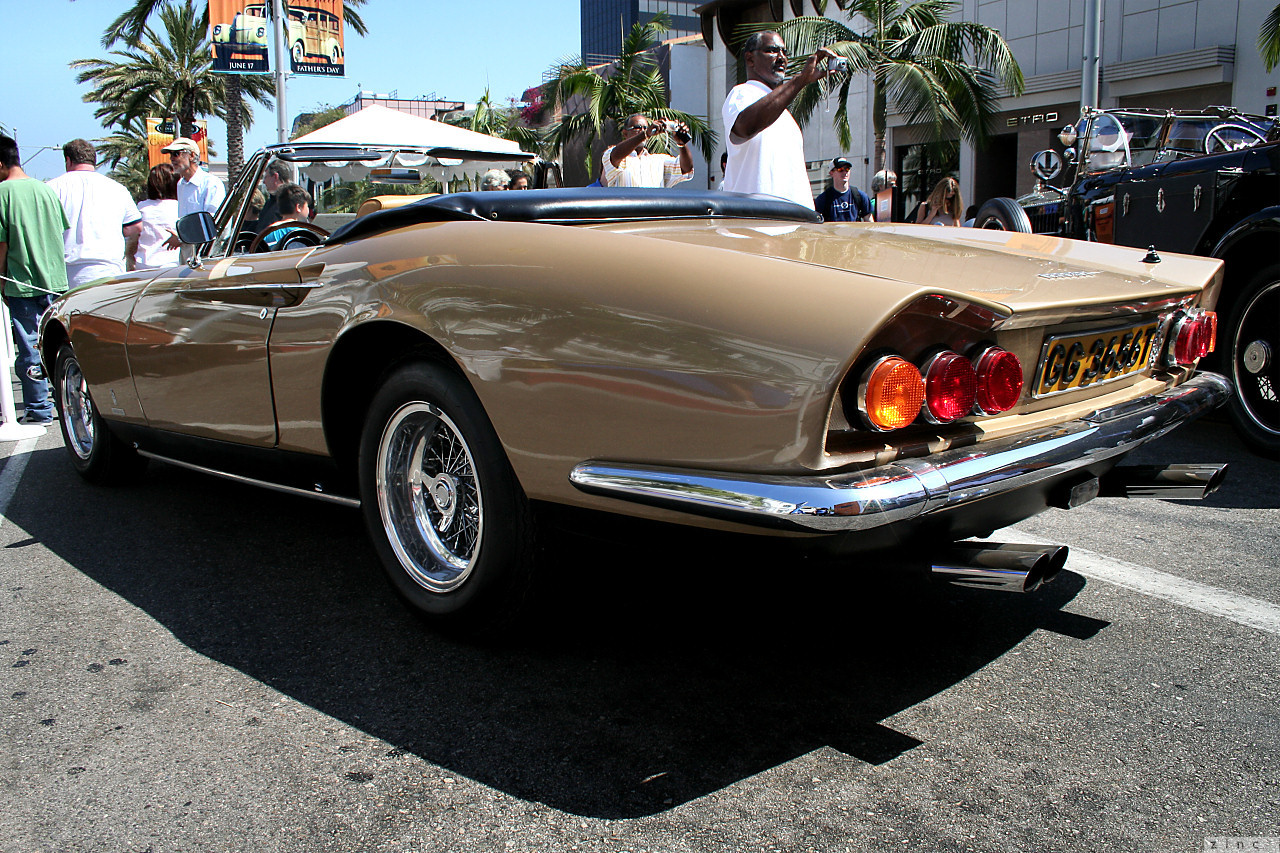
Earlier examples have triple, round taillights

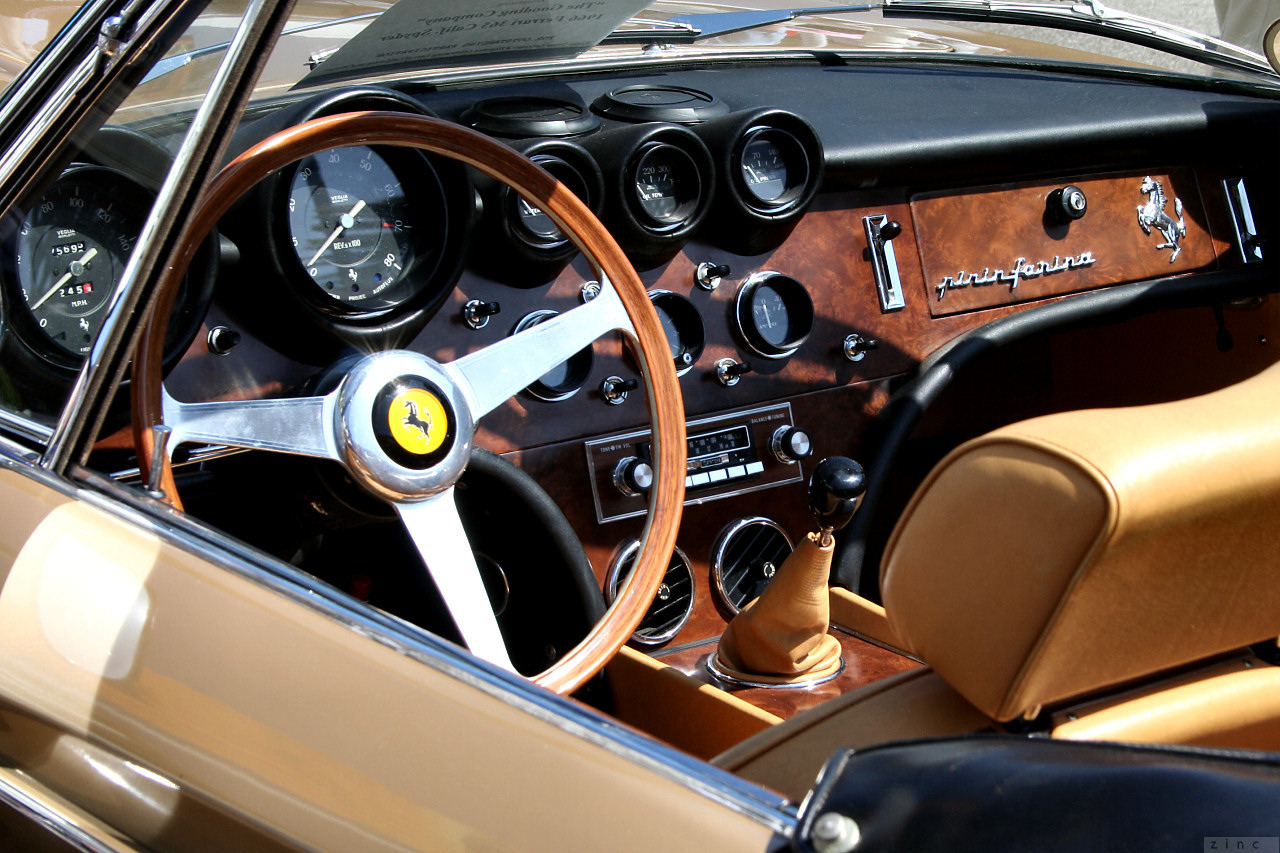
The dashboard
