= Ferrari 250 GT Coupé =

1954–1960 grand touring car produced by Ferrari

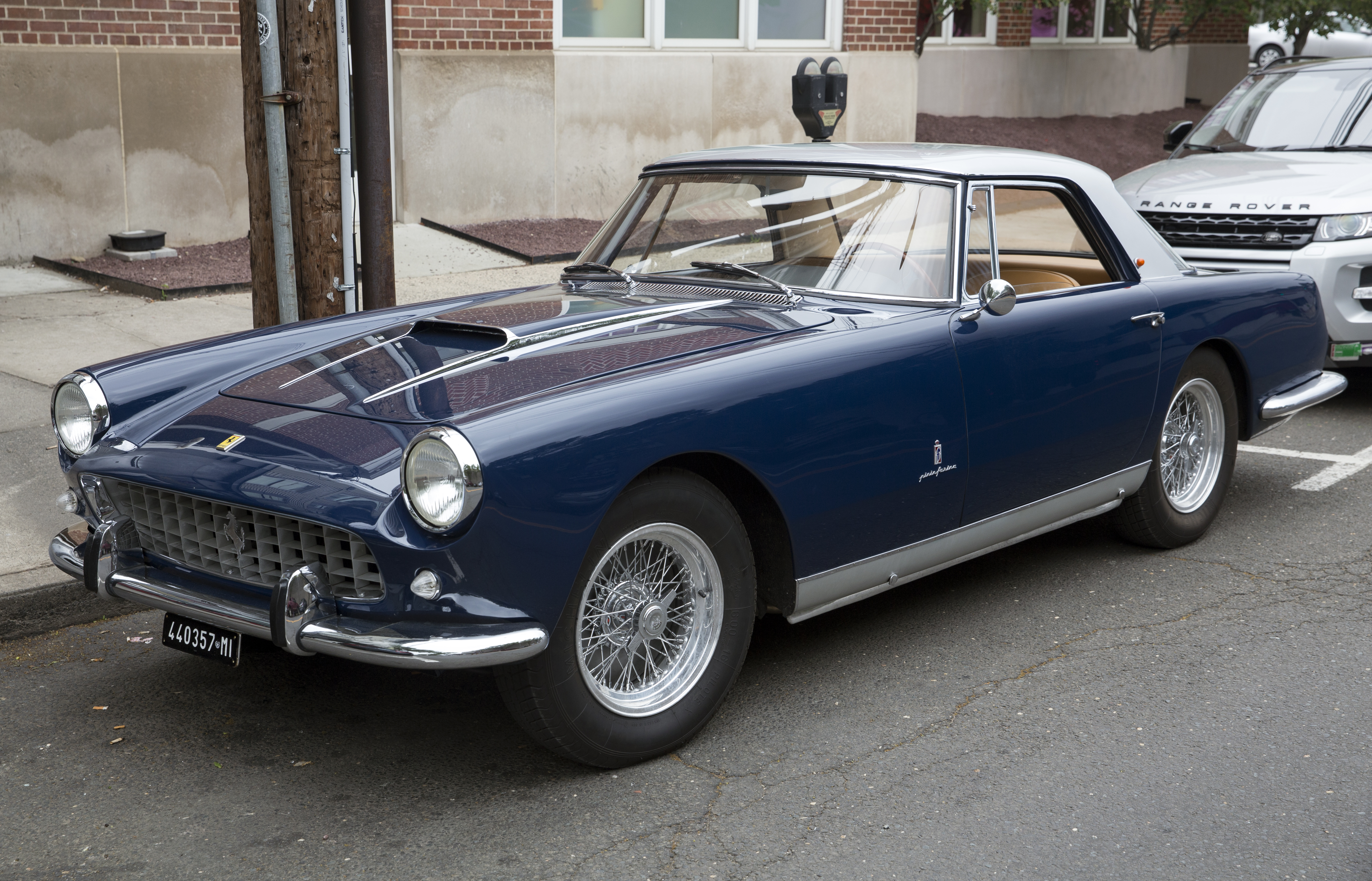
- Ferrari 250 GT Coupé Pinin Farina

Overview
- Manufacturer: Ferrari
- Also called: 250 GT
- Production: 1954–1960

Body and chassis
- Class: Grand tourer
- Body style: 2-door coupé
- Layout: Longitudinally-mounted, front mid-engine, rear-wheel-drive

Powertrain
- Engine: 3.0 L (2953.21 cc) Colombo V12
- Transmission: 4-speed manual

Dimensions
- Wheelbase: 2,600 mm (102.4 in)

Chronology
- Predecessor: Ferrari 250 Europa
- Successor: Ferrari 250 GT 2+2; Ferrari 330 GTC

The Ferrari 250 GT Coupé represented a series of road-going, grand touring cars produced by Ferrari between 1954 and 1960. Presented at the 1954 Paris Motor Show, the 250 Europa GT was the first in the GT-lineage. The design by Pinin Farina was seen as a more civilised version of their sporty Berlinetta 250 MM. Series built cars were an answer to the wealthy clientele demands of a sporty and luxurious Ferrari Gran Turismo, that is also easier to use daily.

Common among all the 250 GT cars was the 3.0-litre Colombo V12 engine and the fact that all were two-seaters. The predecessor to the series was the Lampredi-engined 250 Europa, built in very limited numbers.

The Europa GT was soon followed by the Pinin Farina-designed 250 GT Coupé. As the Carrozzeria Pinin Farina's production capacities were being expanded at that time, the cars were initially bodied at the Carrozzeria Boano, then the Carrozzeria Ellena. After the body production was carried over to Pinin Farina, Ferrari could produce the Coupé in greater numbers than before. This series of models marked the production process transition from hand-crafted to semi-series production.

Even though great strides were taken to standardise the production, there was still a number of individual cars produced identified as Speciale. The successor, manufactured in even greater numbers was the four-seater, Ferrari 250 GT 2+2.

== 250 Europa GT ==
Ferrari 250 Europa GT
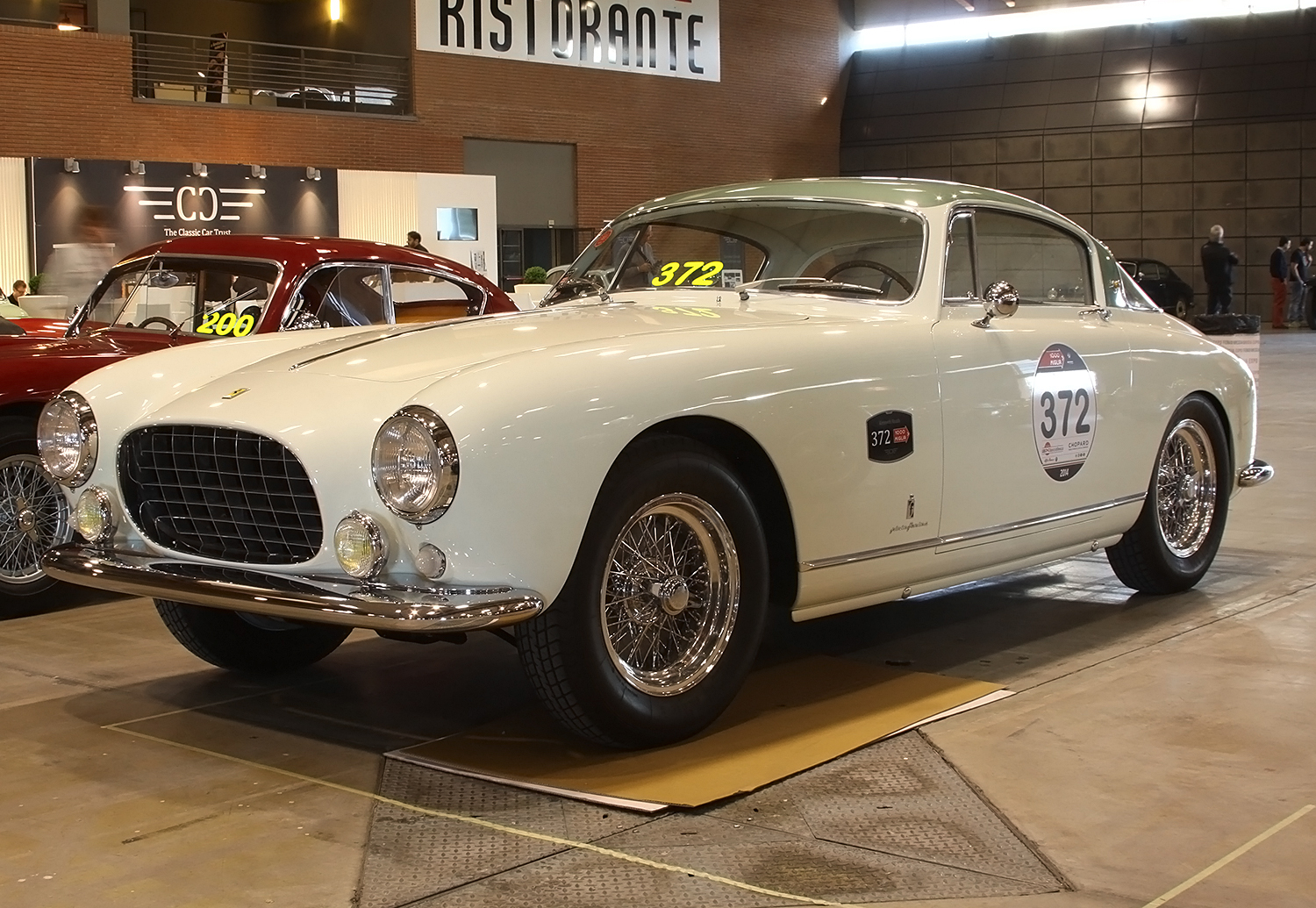
- Ferrari 250 Europa GT Pinin Farina

Overview
- Also called: Europa S2
- Production: 1954–1955; 35 produced
- Designer: Pinin Farina; Vignale

Powertrain
- Engine: 3.0 L (2953.21 cc) Tipo 112 Colombo V12
- Power output: 220 PS

Dimensions
- Length: 4,458 mm (175.5 in)
- Width: 1,676 mm (66.0 in)
- Height: 1,371 mm (54.0 in)
- Curb weight: 1,307 kg (2,881 lb)

The Ferrari 250 Europa GT was a grand touring car produced by Ferrari in 1954 and 1955. It was the first real GT car manufactured by Ferrari and the first in a long lineage of Ferrari road-cars with Gran Turismo moniker in their name. They were also the first to have GT suffix in the chassis number instead of EU.

The 250 Europa GT was seen as a road-going version of the 250 MM race car, and also as a second series to the 250 Europa. Most of the Europa GT cars had Pinin Farina designed and built bodywork and those had a similar, near identical established style. In total only 35 Europa GTs were manufactured.

=== Development ===
History

Up to this point, Ferrari offered semi-race car models that could be driven on the roads. Those were the past Inter-series offered from Maranello, but were not as practical for the elite clientele to be able to use every day. The start of the true road-car trend for Ferrari was the 250 Europa, which was soon followed by Europa GT, sporting ubiquitous Colombo 250-series 3.0-litre V12 engine. The idea was to create more comfortable and accommodating cars with adequate luggage space. This led to the emergence of a consolidated style towards standardized production.

Production

The introduction of the 250 GT series was a major turning point in the rise of Ferrari as a serial manufacturer. Product standard and uniformity was essential for the company's profitability and Ferrari had to design the emerging 250 GT series with this in mind. Ferrari grew their road-going production, expanded their factory and light-alloy foundry. With it and a reliable power unit, Ferrari could meet the needs of more customers, with an unchanging goal to finance the racing activities.

Ferrari chose Pinin Farina as their coachbuilder to realise the bodywork. This cooperation, that begun with a historic meeting of Enzo Ferrari and Battista Farina in a restaurant in 1951, will remain fruitful for many decades for Ferrari production cars.

Design

The exterior design was mostly carried over from the Europa, from which it was developed. Pinin Farina offered two body variants of the Europa GT. The three-window, two-door coupé with panoramic rear window and the other with additional rear side windows. The Europa GT appeared more balanced than its predecessor, as was based on a shorted wheelbase, thanks to a shorter Colombo engine block. Inside of the car remained unchanged in terms of dimensions and space.

Externally only the distance from the front wheel arch to the A-post was reduced. The front of the car remained unchanged with a dominant egg-crate grille that became a strong identifying feature. Sides were almost devoid of any additional decoration.

=== Notable examples ===
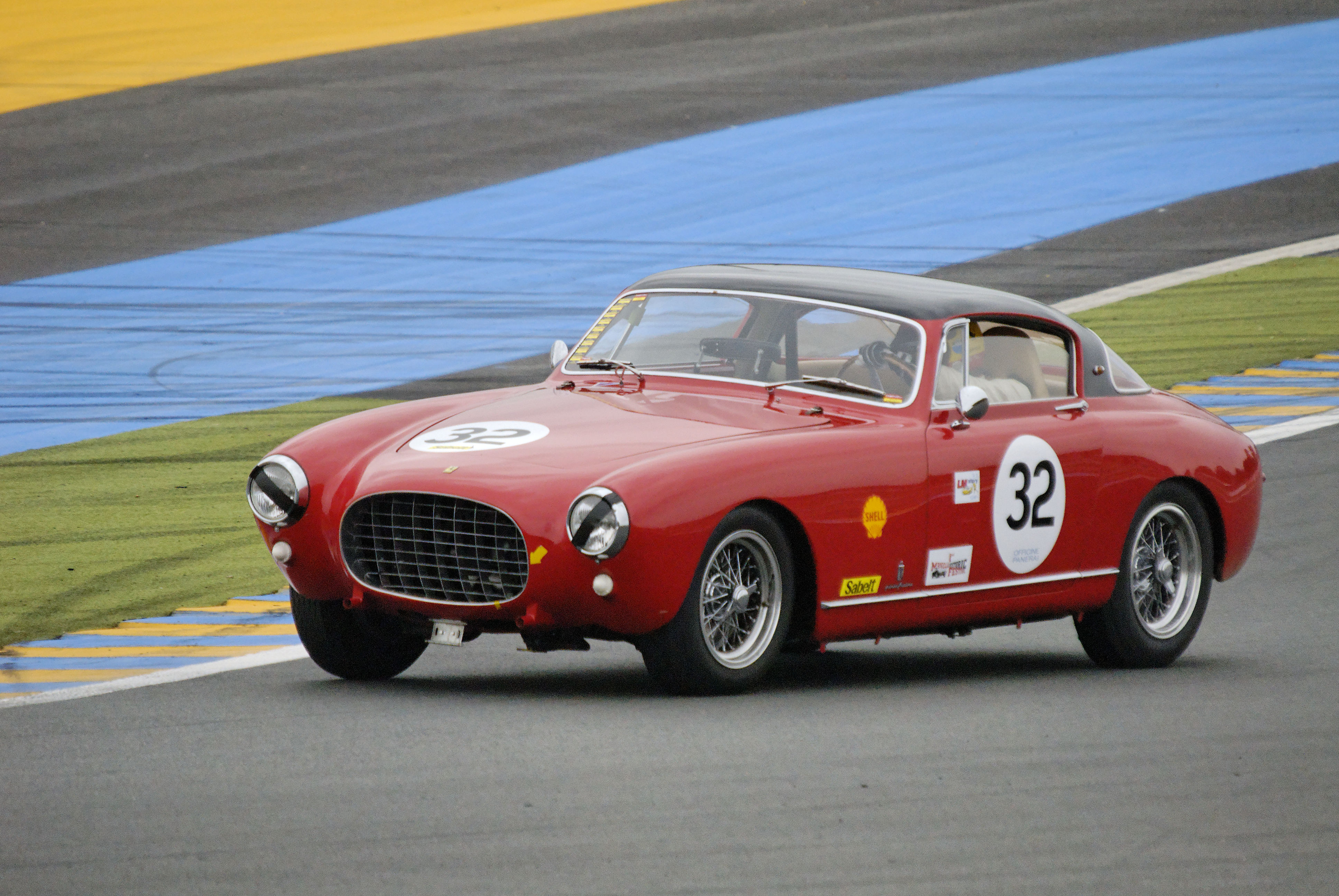
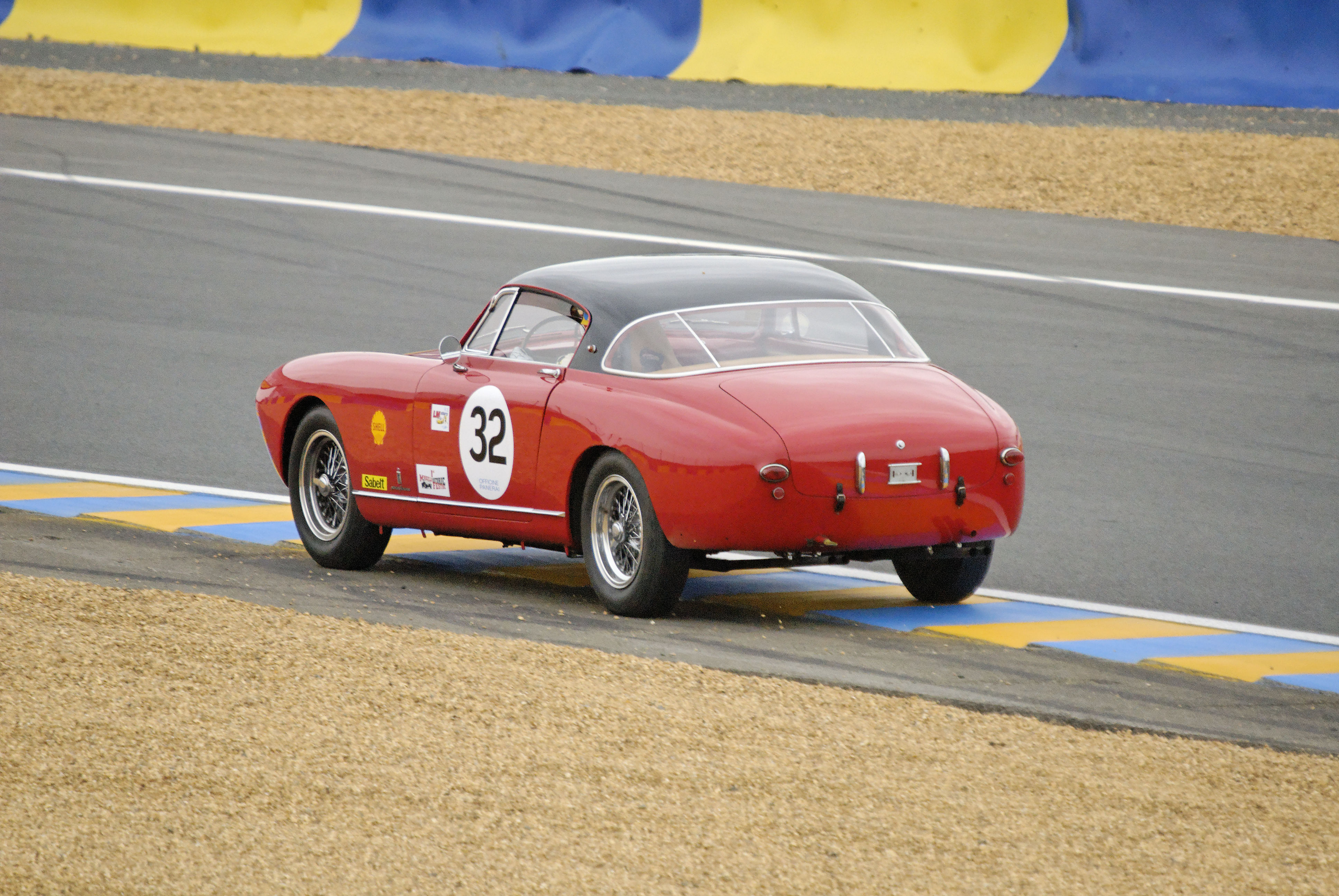
1954 Ferrari 250 Europa GT s/n 0357GT. The first 250 GT.

The very first example produced, s/n 0357GT bodied by Pinin Farina, represented not only the emergence of the Europa GT but also of the whole lineage of 250 GT cars. It was first presented at the Paris Motor Show in October 1954. The car was unusual for having two small rear seats, as others had a luggage parcel shelf. It was also one of two coupés originally bodied in aluminium. From 1956 the car was owned by Olivier Gendebien who campaigned the car in Tour de France automobile to a third place overall, with Michel Ringoir. Ringoir then owned the car from 1957 and also raced it further in France and Belgium. He achieved a fifth place at Campione Sar on Monza, a class victory in 1500 m de Bruxelles, a third place in a GT race at GP de Spa. He also won the GT-class in GP MG Car Club race on Zandvoort and scored a sixth place overall at GP Germany on Nürburgring in a GT race.

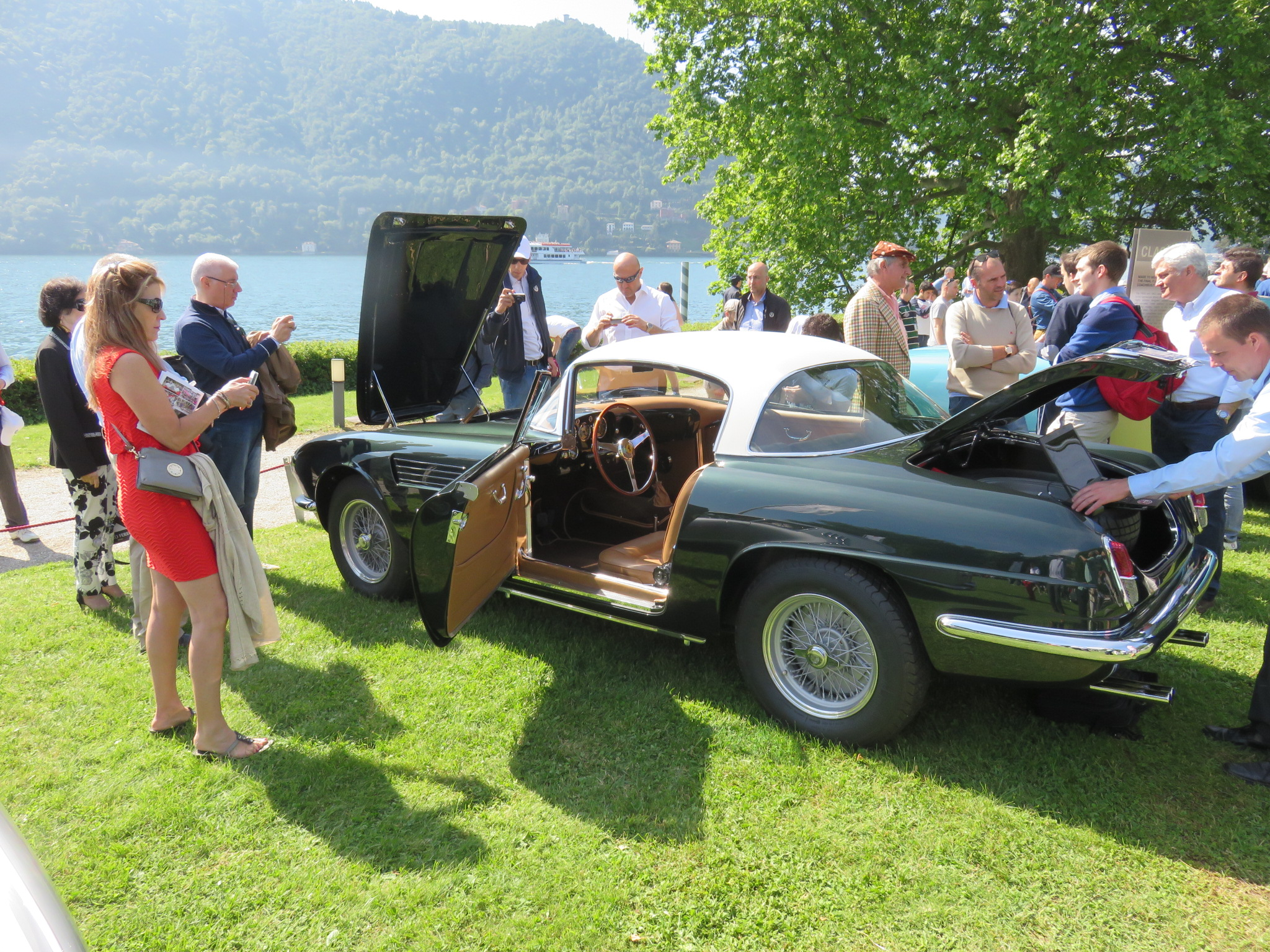
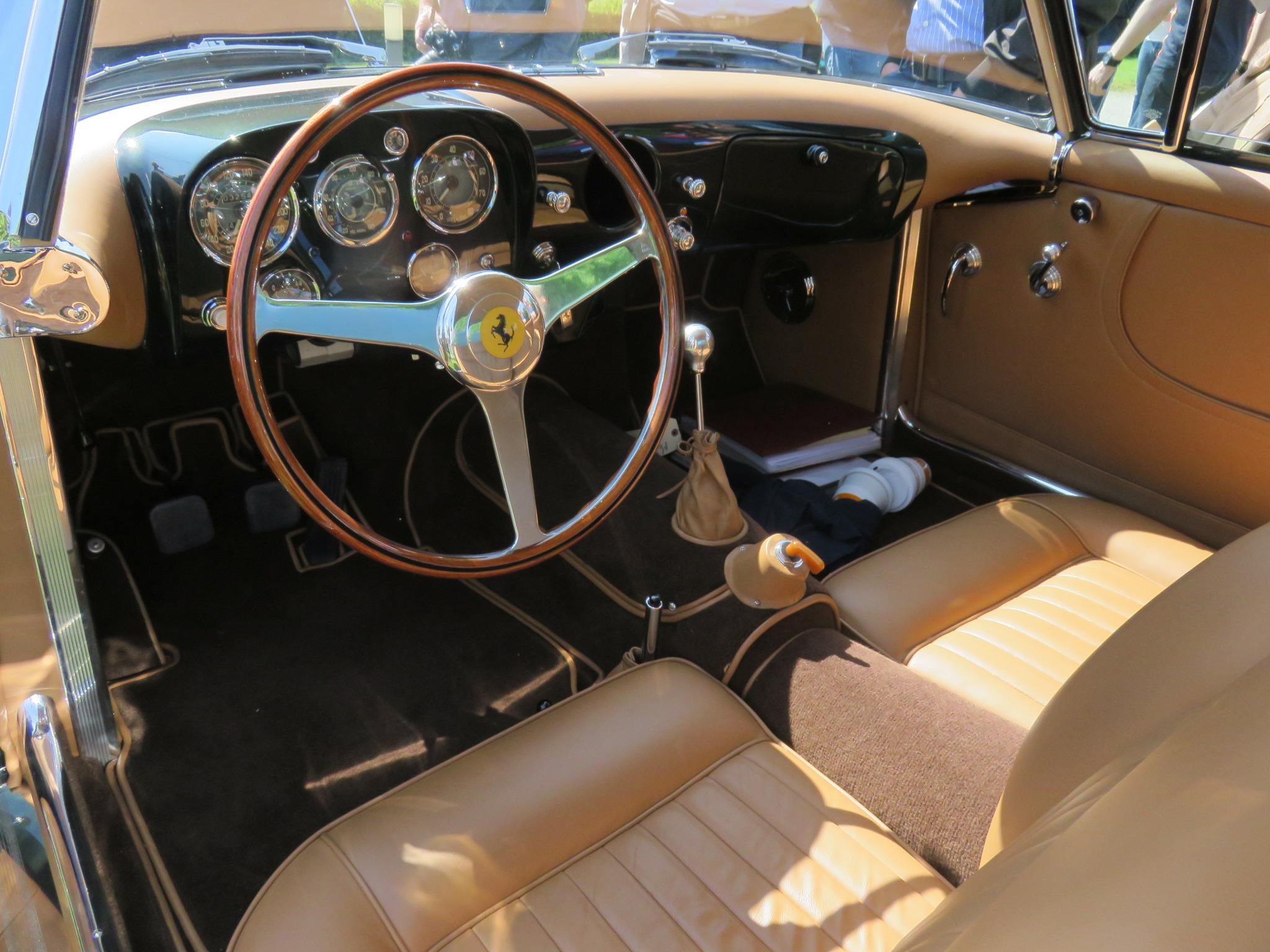
Ferrari 250 Europa GT Vignale Coupé at Concorso d'Eleganza Villa d'Este 2015

Chassis 0359GT was the second example produced. It sported a unique coupé coachwork designed by Giovanni Michelotti and realized by Vignale. The extraordinary shape included a wrap-around front and rear windscreens. The front received a large oval grille and the rear fenders had small fins protruding upwards. The one-off 250 Europa GT was sold new to Princess Lilian, Princess of Réthy, the second wife of King Leopold III of Belgium.

Coupé s/n 0375GT, was the only one example built as a right hand drive car.

Chassis 0407GT, realized in 1955, was a turning point in the design style for Pinin Farina. It represented a transition between the Europa GT body and upcoming 250 GT Coupé cars. This Europa GT received a reworked front end with flatter, lower and longer nose and more elliptical grille with a silver prancing horse and additional fog lamps inside it. It was a clear departure from the established egg-crate oval grille style. The rear was no longer rounded with the fenders, instead, the fender tips protruded behind the rear deck and were ended with vertical tail lights. The panoramic rear window incorporated dual windshield wipers.

==== Europa GT Berlinetta ====
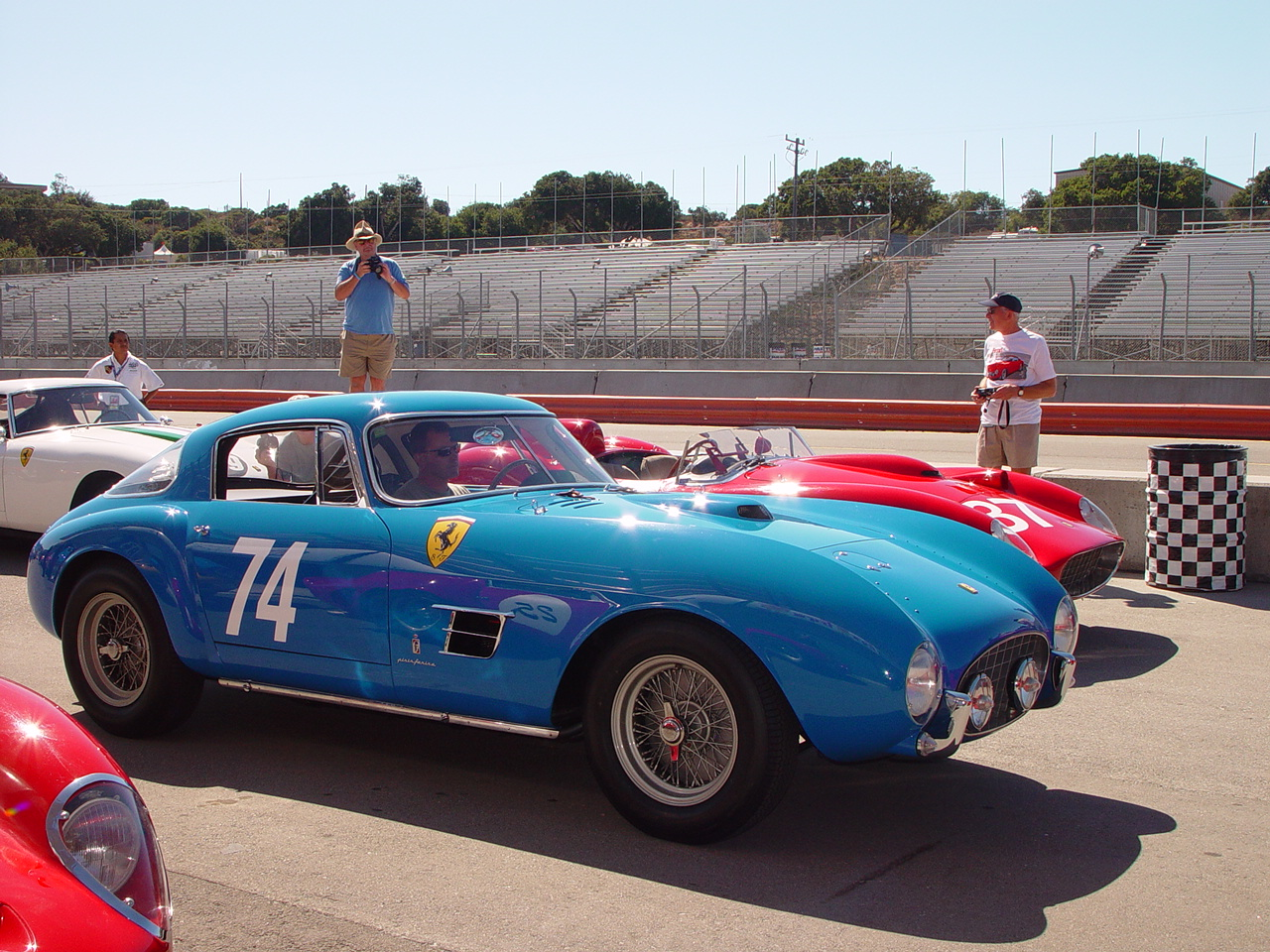
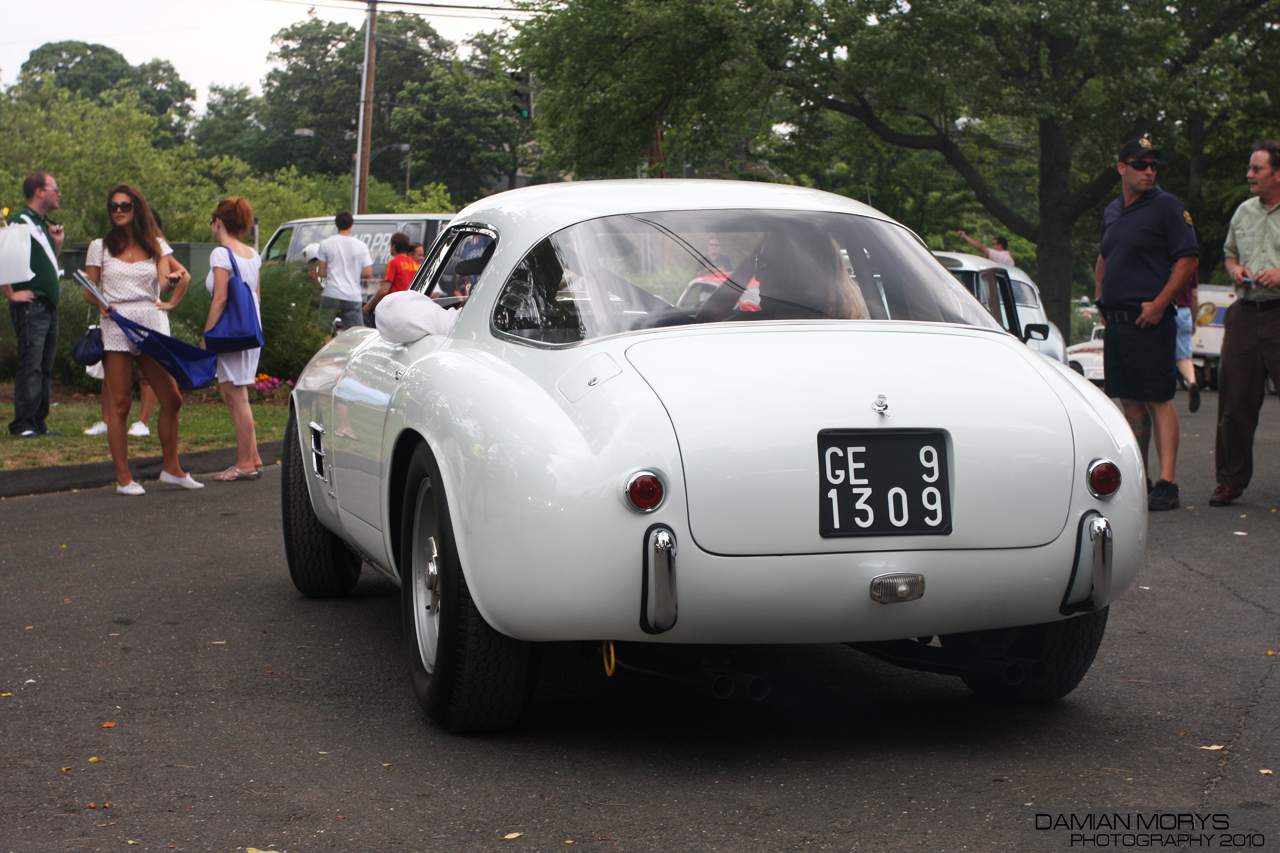
1955 Ferrari 250 Europa GT Pinin Farina Berlinetta s/n 0383GT

Between 1954 and 1955 Ferrari and Pinin Farina created several lightweight aluminium bodied cars, the Europa GT Berlinettas, with rounded shapes and improved aerodynamics. Four of them were fitted with competition berlinetta bodies similar to those of the 250 MM, with short, rounded rear, fastback profile and panoramic rear window. Using an evolution of the 250 MM engine called the Tipo 112 A, they could produce up to 230 PS (169 kW; 227 hp) and 275 Nm. Even though the cars were competition-ready, none of them scored any major victories and mostly were denied any track use.

S/n 0369GT, was the first of the Berlinetta Speciale series and the only one from 1954, it was destroyed in 1958.

The Berlinetta Speciale, chassis 0383GT, was created in 1955 as a second car in the series. Body, similar to the 250 MM, had no rear louvres and only small vents on the front fenders. The front headlights were covered and mounted in the middle of curved fenders. It combined a type 508 chassis with type 112 A engine, and is considered as the first ‘Tour de France’ Berlinetta prototype. In 1956, Paolo Lena and Orlando Palanga entered it in Tour de France automobile race, but failed to finish it. Later the same year, Lena managed a second in class and third overall at the Serravalle–San Marino hillclimb and a third place at Coppa InterEuropa GT race on Monza. From 1958, Frank Adams campaigned the car in the United States, winning the SCCA Bridgehampton preliminary GT race.

S/n 0385GT was a third Berlinetta Speciale, finished in silver and presented at the 1955 Turin Motor Show. Just as some of the competition models, this car did not have any sort of boot lid. It was later sold to the President of the Italian Automobile Club.

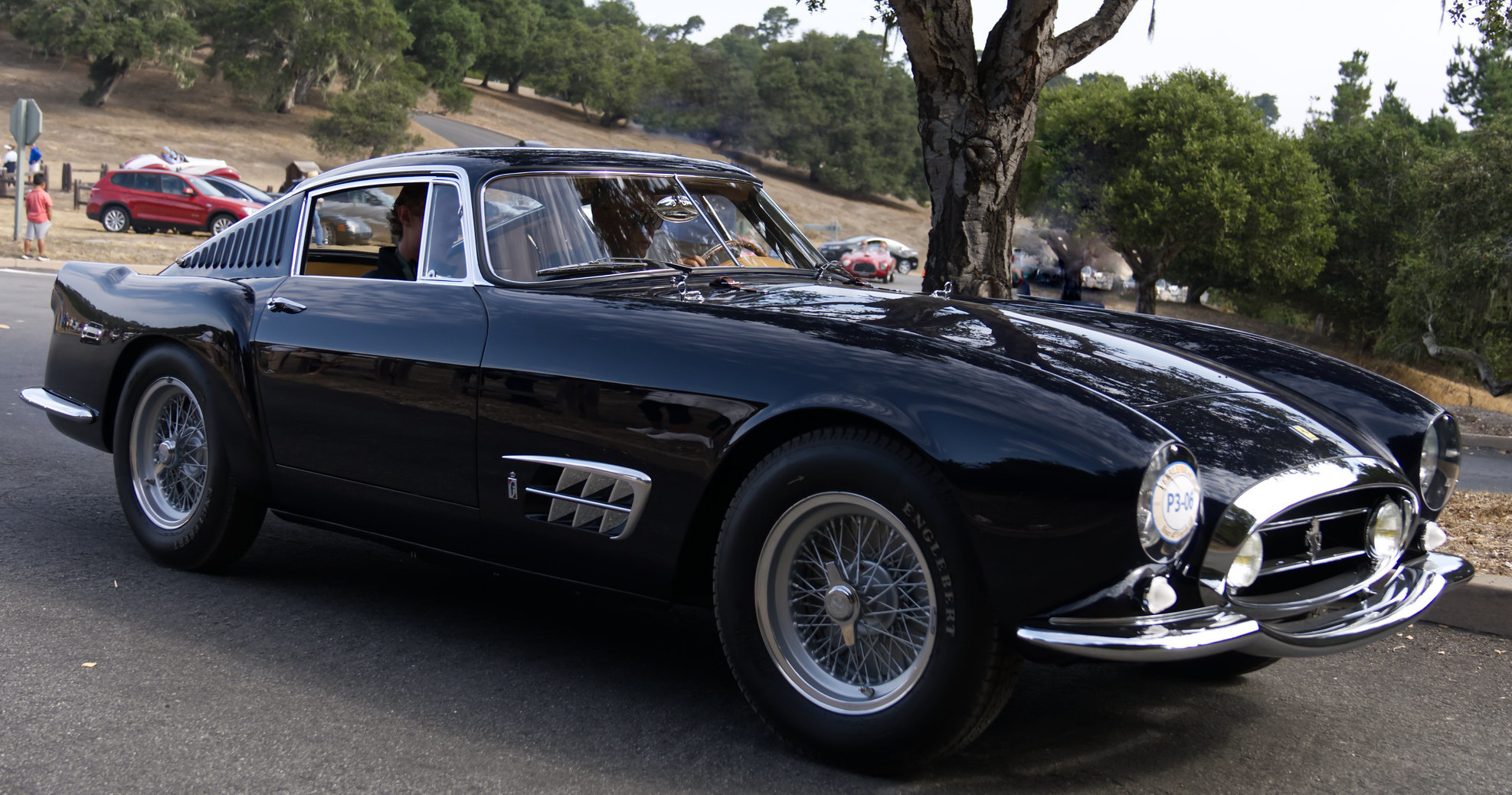
Europa GT Berlinetta s/n 0393GT

S/n 0393GT was the last of the series and the only with a different body style. Instead of a short rounded rear portion, it featured prominent double-stepped rear fins, reminiscent of the 375 MM Pinin Farina Coupé Speciale s/n 0490AM. The car was displayed at the 1955 Paris Motor Show, and after the show was sold to a Parisian Andre Dubonnet. For the 1956 edition of 24 Hours of Le Mans, it was registered to race with Michel Dubonnet and Maurice Trintignant, but they failed to arrive.

==== Europa GT Competizione ====
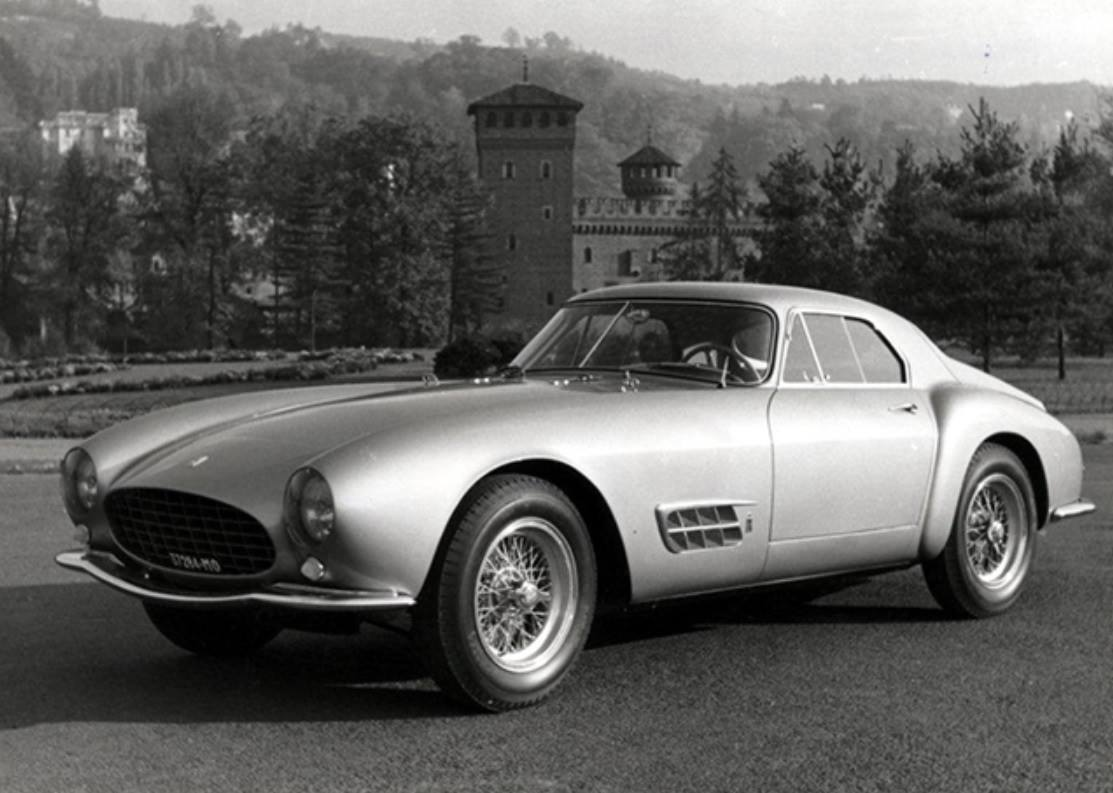
Ferrari 250 Europa GT Competizione s/n 0403GT

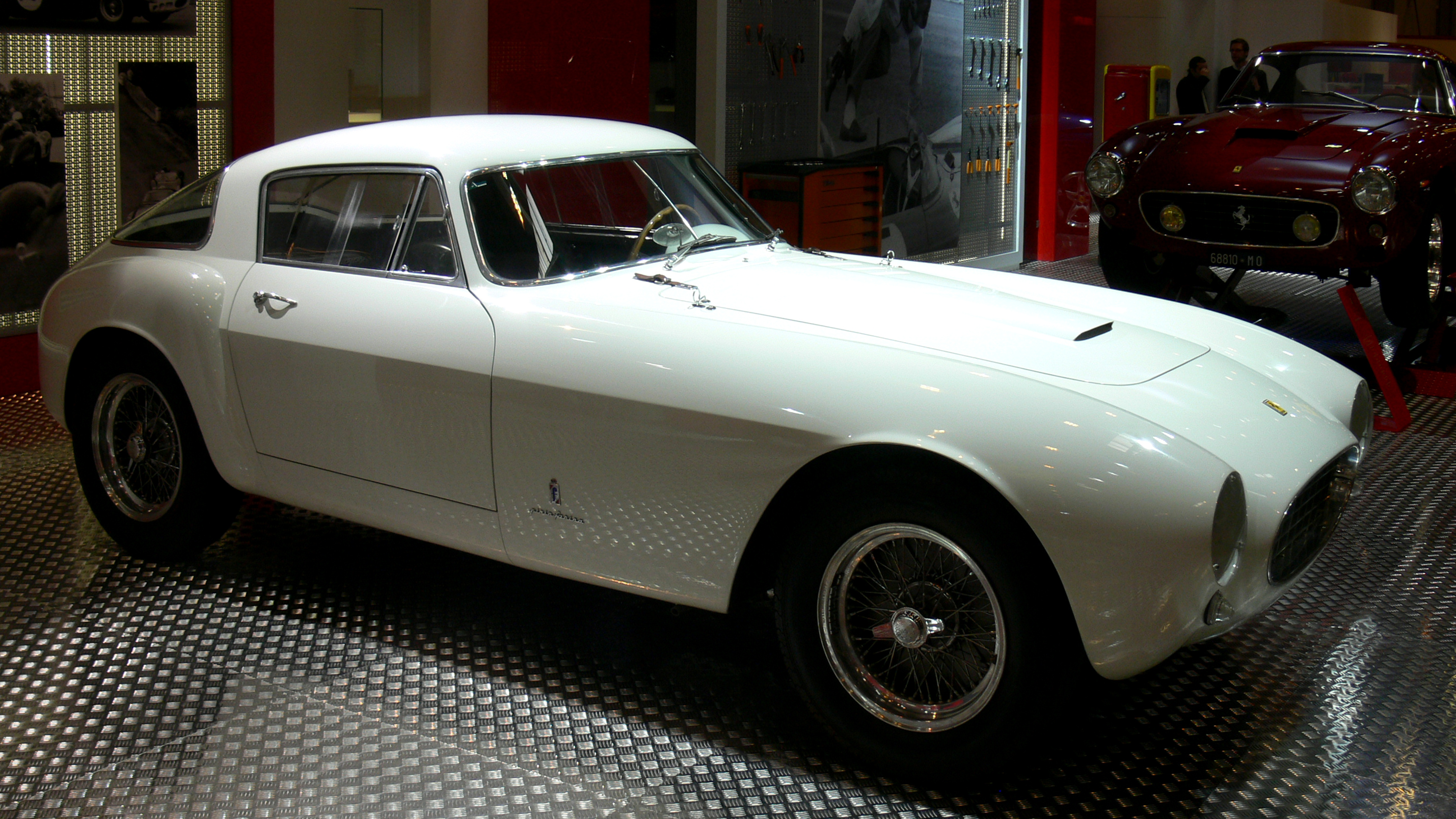
Competizione s/n 0415GT

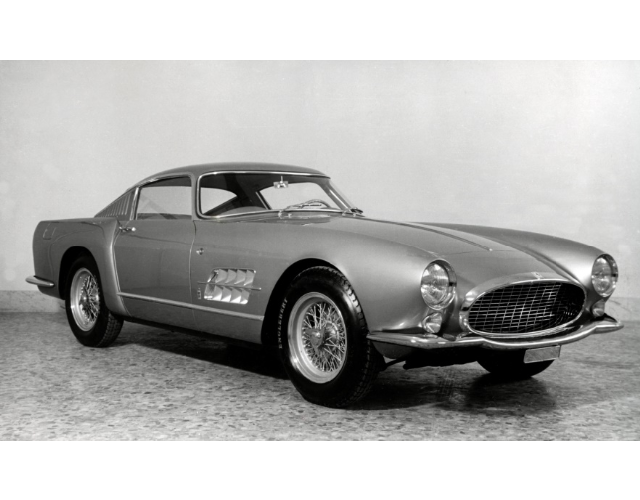
Competizione, 'Tour de France' prototype s/n 0425GT

Later in 1955, Ferrari and Pinin Farina produced another three special bodied cars that are often also regarded as prototypes for the upcoming 250 GT Berlinetta ‘Tour de France’ models produced between 1956 and 1959. All of the three Europa GT Competitziones had different body styles, wheelbase measurements and details.

The first Competition Berlinetta Speciale, s/n 0403GT, was bodied in alloy by Pinin Farina on a 2,530 mm (99.6 in) wheelbase. The rear section, that incorporated boot lid, fins and rear window, was created in the style known from the 375 MM Coupé Speciale, s/n 0456AM, for actress Ingrid Bergman. The car also sported a type 342 rear axle.

The second car of the series, chassis 0415GT, was bodied in the 250 MM style, with short rear and fastback profile. Lightweight aluminium body was based on a shorter, 2,480 mm (97.6 in), wheelbase. It received an uprated type 112 A engine and was raced briefly by Marquis Alfonso de Portago and later Gleb Derujinsky in the United States. De Portago's only race in Nassau yielded a fourth place overall.

S/n 0425GT was the last of the series. Designed and bodied either by Pinin Farina or Scaglietti on a 2,480 mm (97.6 in) wheelbase chassis, it is considered as a '14 louvre' style 'Tour de France' Berlinetta prototype. In 1956 it was presented at the Geneva Motor Show and later at the Turin Motor Show, but despite being a competition car, it never raced, and by 1959 was exported to the United States.

=== Specifications ===
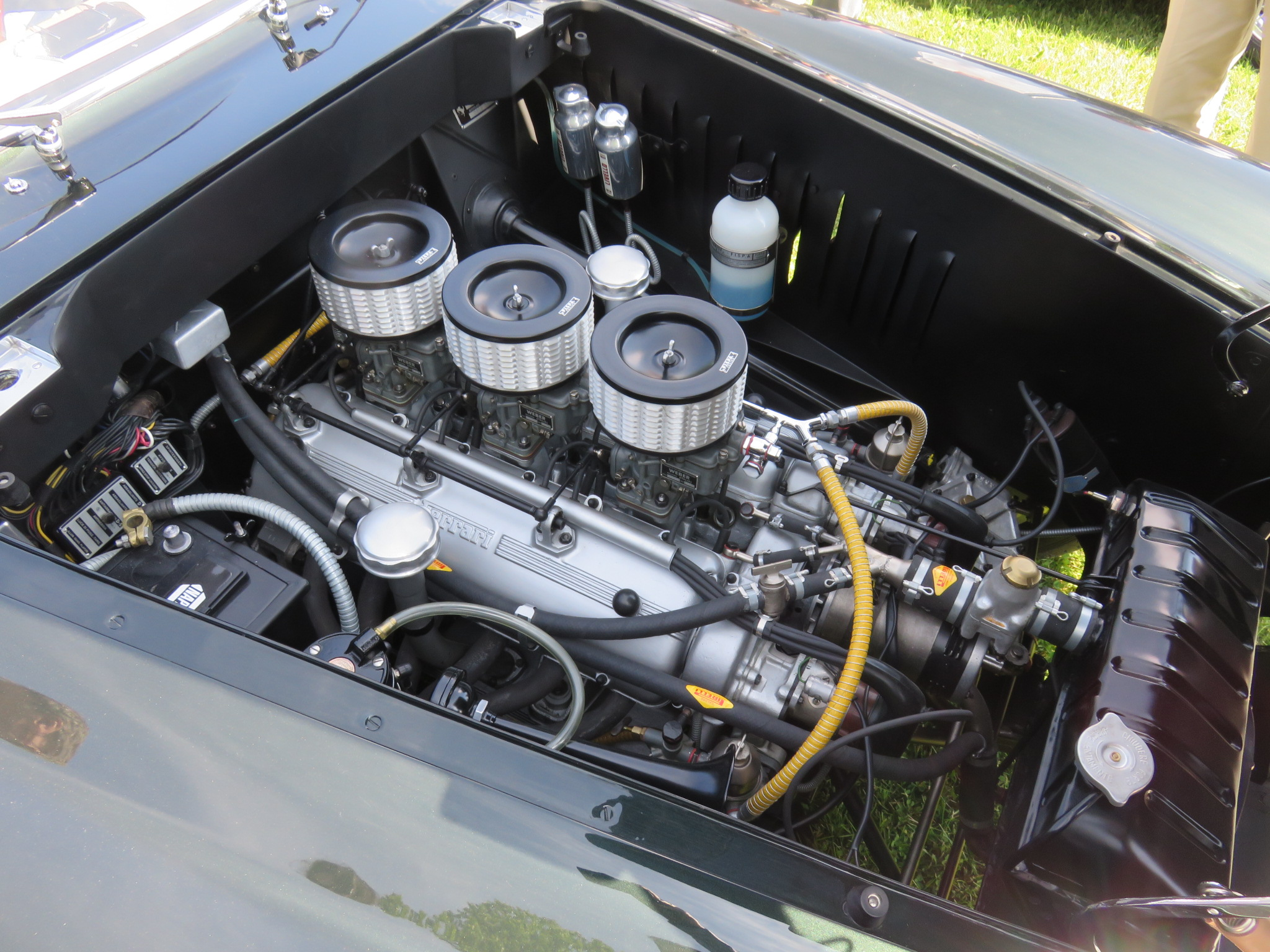
Type 112 Colombo 3.0-litre V12 engine

Engine

The 250 Europa GT sported a Colombo-designed V12 engine, instead of a Lampredi unit from the preceding 250 Europa. The original Colombo block used smaller bore-spacing then Lampredi and hence was called a 'short-block'. The engine was mounted in the front behind front axle. The type 112, 60° V12 unit had a bore and stroke of 73 by 58.8 mm (2.9 by 2.3 in), and the resulting total capacity was 2,953.21 cc (3.0 L; 180.2 cu in). Unitary displacement measured 246.10 cc, which rounded up gave the basis for the name of the series, the 250, as was the naming convention used by Ferrari.

With 8.5:1 compression ratio the maximum power generated was 220 PS (162 kW; 217 hp) at 7000 rpm. Torque figures were approximately 265 Nm at 5000 rpm. Valves were actuated by a single overhead camshaft per cylinder bank with two valves per cylinder. Fuel was fed by a bank of three Weber 36DCZ/3 carburettors, or optionally a 42DCZ type. The ignition system consisted of a single spark plug per cylinder, served by two coils and horizontal mounted distributor. Lubrication employed a wet sump oil system and the clutch was a twin-plate type. The Europa GT was capable of 230 km/h (142.9 mph) top speed.

Chassis

The tubular steel chassis of the type 508 was built around two main longitudinal members with cross bracing and body supports. Unlike the predecessors, the rear portion passed above the rear axle. The wheelbase was shortened by 200 mm (7.9 in) to 2,600 mm (102.4 in) and the front are rear tracks were widened by 29 mm (1.1 in). This chassis and engine setup will be used on various road and race Ferrari models from 250 GT-family.

Suspension and transmission

The front suspension was independent with twin wishbones, transverse leaf springs and hydraulic shock absorbers. Leaf springs will later give way to helical spring setup. The rear suspension sported a live axle with semi-elliptic leaf springs and lever type hydraulic shock absorbers. Brakes were hydraulically operated drum type all round. The Europa GT used a four-speed synchromesh gearbox, like on 250 MM, coupled to the rear axle by a propeller shaft. The fuel tank had a capacity of 100 litres.

== 250 GT Coupé ==
The Ferrari 250 GT Coupé was a GT car produced by Ferrari between 1955 and 1960. Designed by Pinin Farina it was produced by three different coachbuilders along the way. The first two series known by their coachbuilders as Boano and Ellena were mechanically very similar to the preceding Europa GT. They were seen as a gradual refinement rather than radical redesign. The last series was built by Carrozzeria Pinin Farina itself, after they finished relocating and expanding their bodyshop. It also features completely new shape and technical improvements.

=== Boano/Ellena ===
Ferrari 250 GT Coupé Boano; Ferrari 250 GT Coupé Ellena
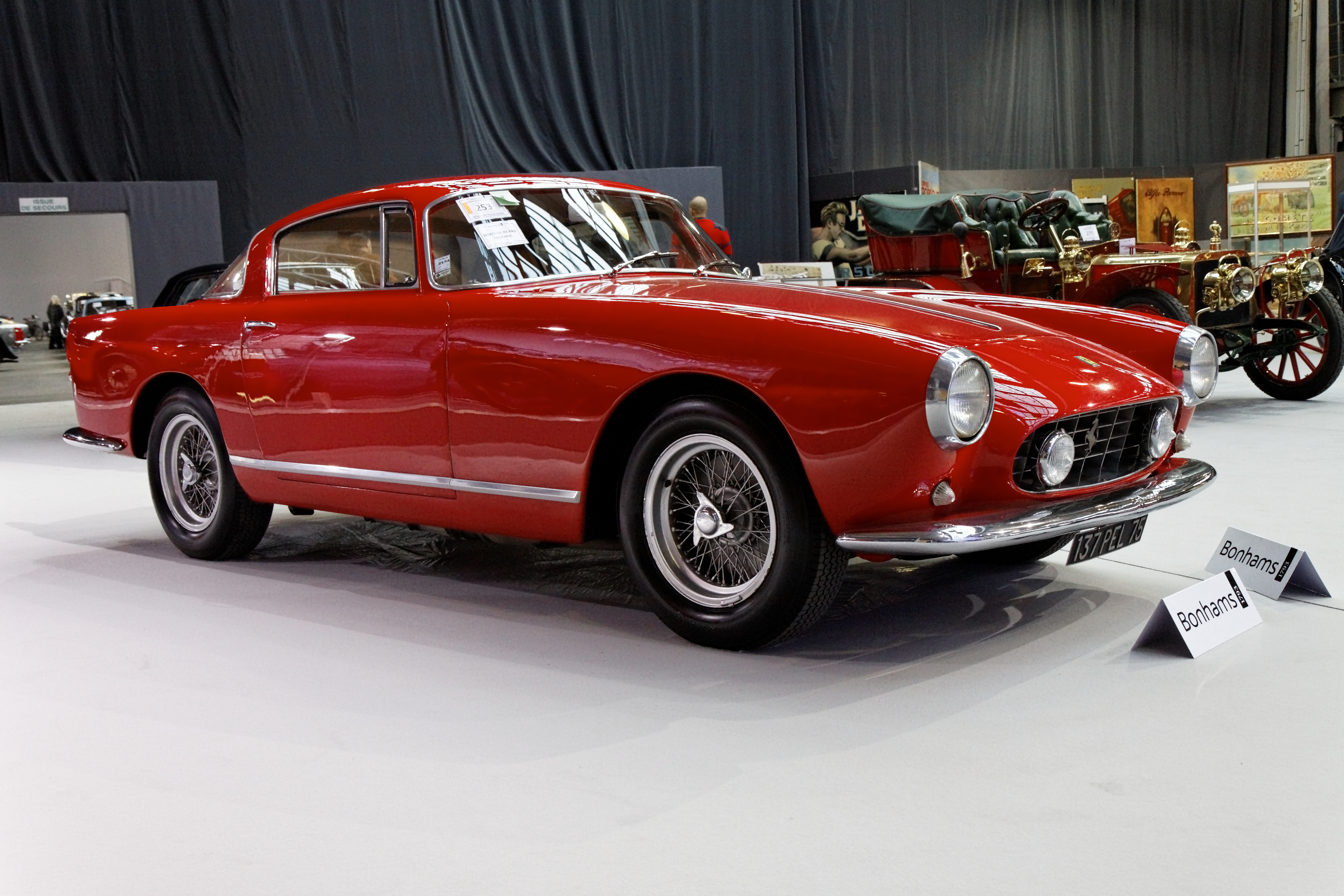
- Ferrari 250 GT Coupé Boano

Overview
- Production: 1955–1957; 88 (Boano); 1957–1958; 50 (Ellena)
- Designer: Carrozzeria Pinin Farina

Powertrain
- Engine: 3.0 L (2953.21 cc) Tipo 128 Colombo V12
- Power output: 240 PS

Dimensions
- Length: 4,458 mm (175.5 in)
- Width: 1,676 mm (66.0 in)
- Height: 1,346 mm (53.0 in) (Boano); 1,372 mm (54.0 in) (Ellena)
- Curb weight: 1,307 kg (2,881 lb)

==== Boano Coupé ====
When Ferrari planned the sales increase of the 250 GT Coupé, it became clear that Pinin Farina fell victim to its own success and had to expand to keep up with the body production demands. Ferrari built chassis in an already expanded factory and in a more or less standardized manner.

Pinin Farina's current facilities at Corso Trapani in Turin were not big enough to accommodate a semi-series production. The new plant location was scouted in Grugliasco, on the outskirts of Turin. By 1955, the new site was chosen by Battista Farina's son Sergio and technical director Renzo Carli, and the construction began. Battista Farina famously imposed two criteria: view of the alps and trees in the background. With this expansion Farina would also steer the management towards the younger generation, namely his son.

Felice Mario Boano established his coachbuilding company with his son Gian Paolo and partner Luciano Pollo, as 'Carrozzeria Boano' at Via Collegno in Grugliasco in 1954, after he had left Carrozzeria Ghia in 1953. Boano and Giorgio Alberti bought out the Carrozzeria Ghia a decade earlier after the death of Giacinto Ghia. Boano received the contract to produce the bodies and interiors for the 250 GT Coupé and Pinin Farina would meanwhile build their new factory. Boano imposed some aesthetic changes to the design and removed the kick-up behind the doors and lower the roofline slightly.

===== Design =====
Carrozzeria Pinin Farina was responsible for the design of the new series of Coupés. The design was an evolution of the Speciale Coupé s/n 0407GT with completely redesigned rear end. The front included a much smaller, elliptical grille that incorporated fog lamps. The rear portion was flanked by a square and protruding tail fins. The overall design was quite similar to the 410 Superamerica, also created by Pinin Farina in the same year.

At the 1956 Geneva Motor Show in March, Pinin Farina presented their first prototype 250 GT Coupé alongside a 410 Superamerica, or a 250 GT Coupé Speciale with almost identical style, and a Boano-bodied Speciale Cabriolet. Pinin Farina bodied a total of nine prototypes of the series before Boano took over the production. Boano coupés can be easily recognized by having a single straight line running through the length of the car, without any kick-ups behind the doors, as was on Pinin Farina's original design. Very few cars received an additional hood air scoop.

===== Production =====
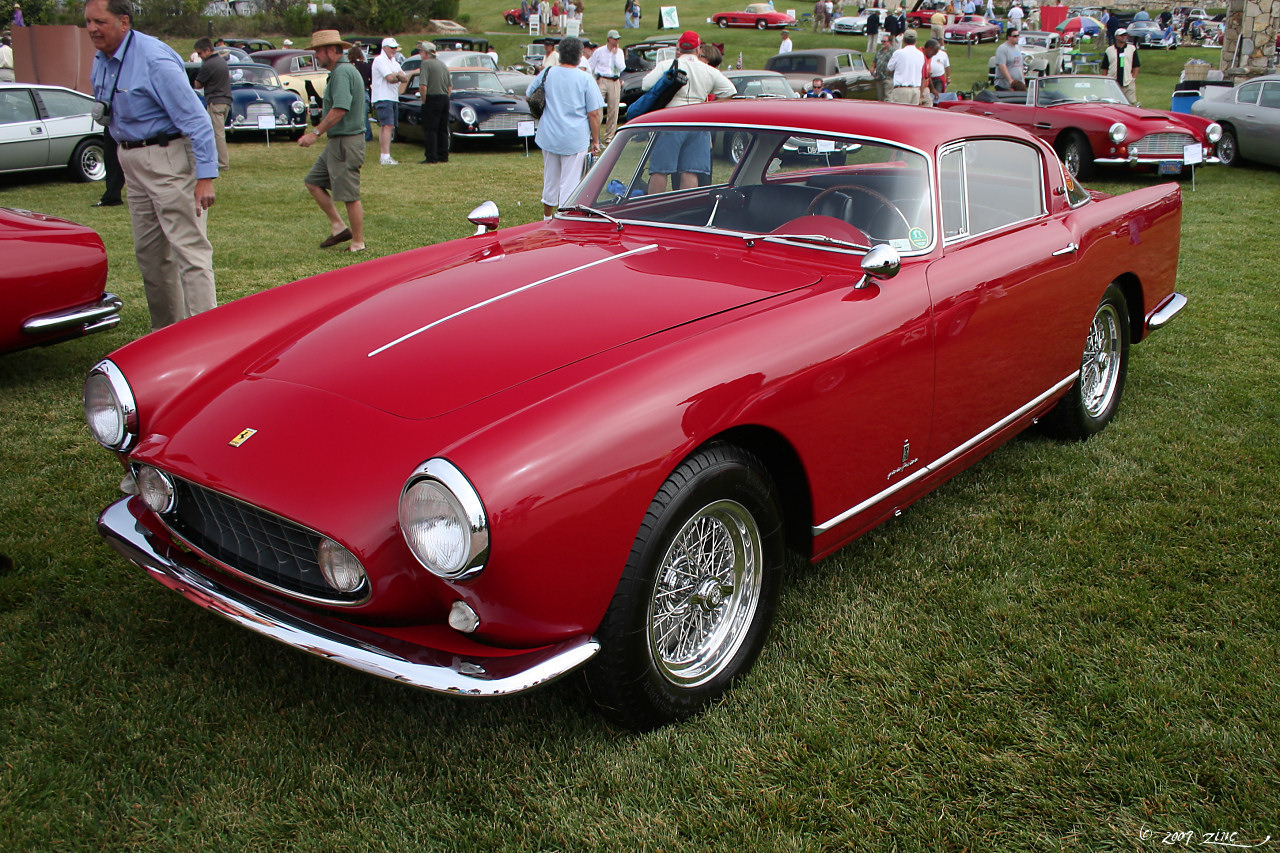
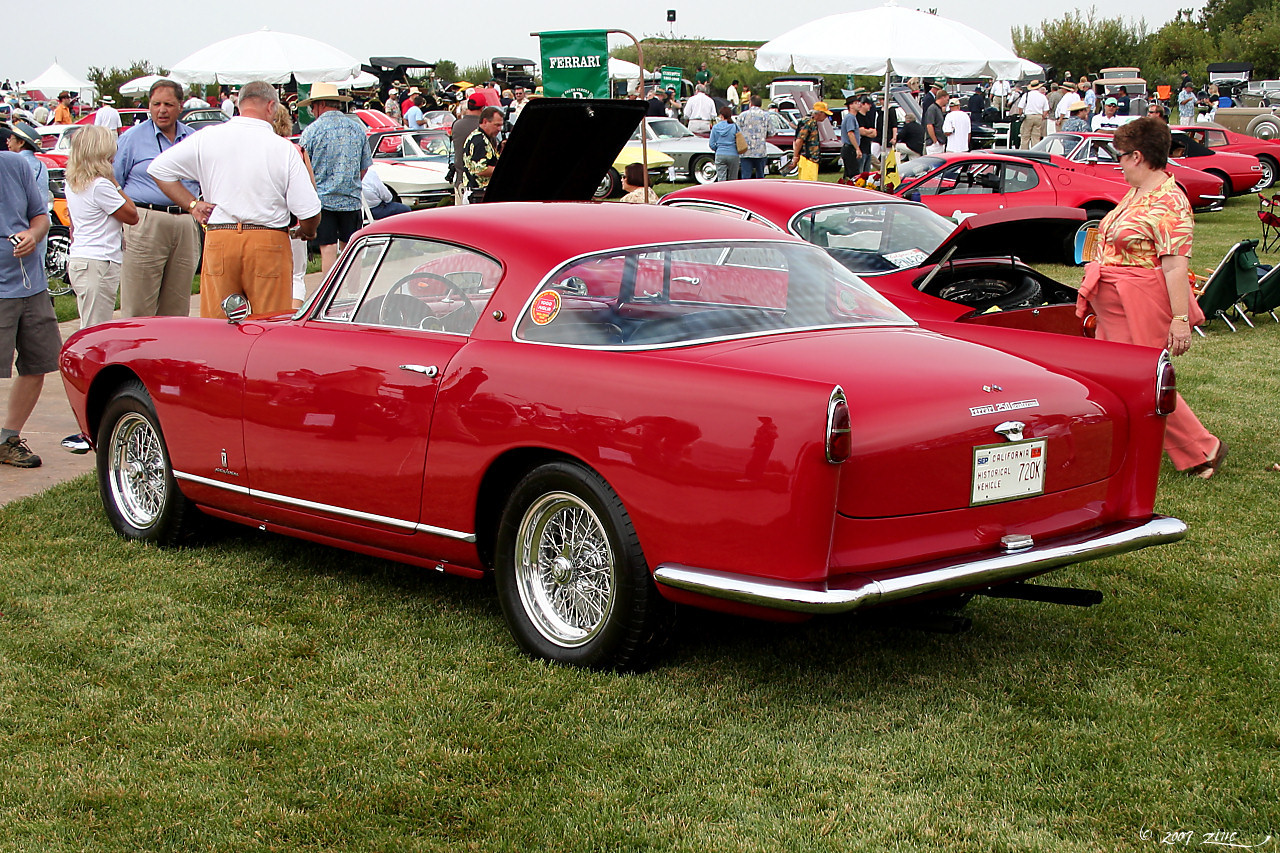
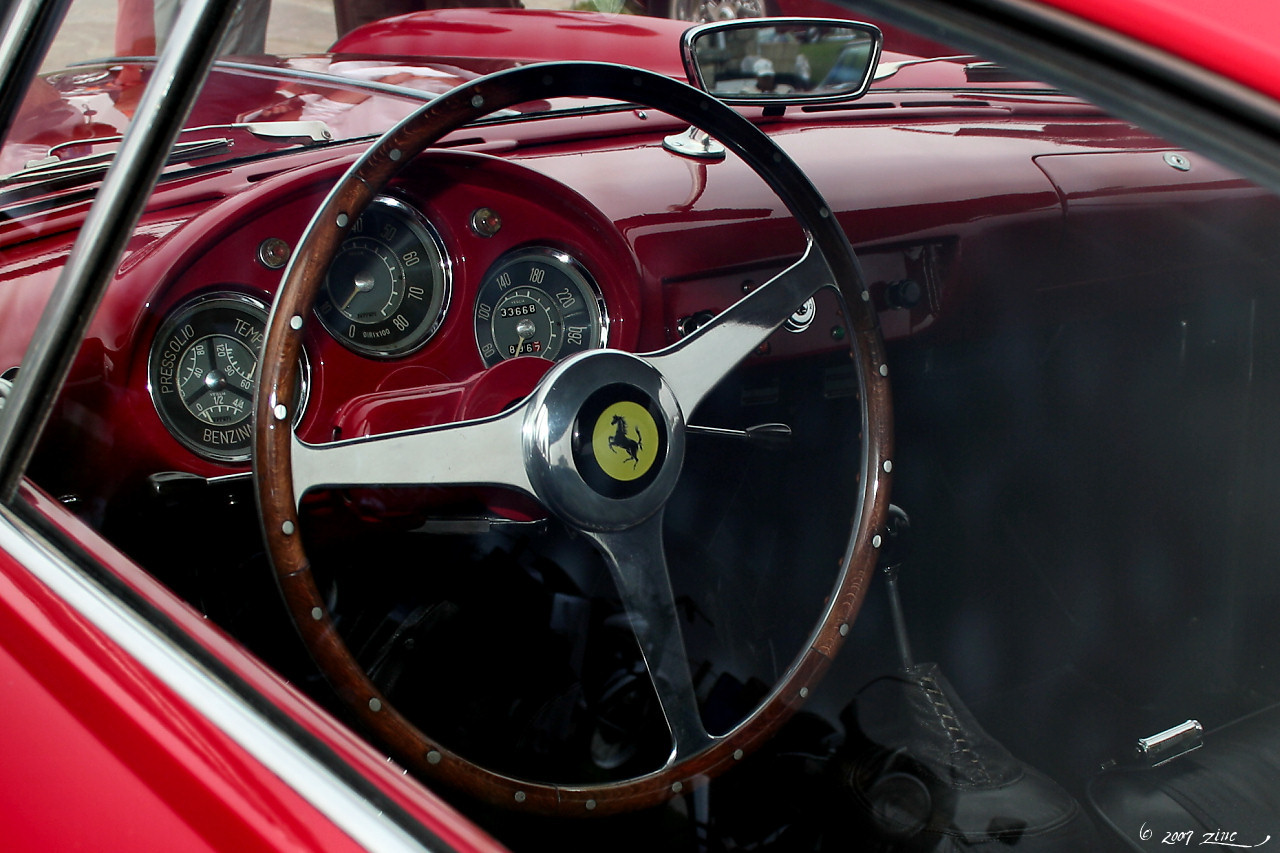
1956 Ferrari 250 GT Coupé Pinin Farina, 1st prototype s/n 0429GT. Pinin Farina interior (rightmost photo)

Mario Boano not only owned a design studio located in Turin, but also had a factory in Brescia that was able to receive and complete large orders. Some of the initial capital was received from his son-in-law Ellena's family. A number of proprietary components such as door latches, windshield wipers or window winding mechanisms were supplied by third parties, such as Fiat and Alfa Romeo, increasing serviceability and spare parts availability. Neither Boano nor Ellena had any identifying script or emblem on their cars, unlike Pinin Farina, because they acted as subcontractors. A number of cars, 14 in total, were created as competition cars or 'Competizione', with complete light alloy bodywork.

===== Notable examples =====
Chassis 0429GT was the first example produced by Pinin Farina in 1955. It featured a steel body with light alloy opening panels, hood and doors. Chassis was of a 508 type, combined with an engine tipo 112, carried over from the Europa GT. The car was presented at the 1956 Geneva Motor Show.

S/n 0443GT, completed in 1956, was one of the lightweight, all-alloy ‘Competizione’. It was sold to a French customer, Jean Estager, who campaigned the car for a couple of years, winning classes in Rallye des Alpes and Col du Perthus. Also in 1956, Estager and Louis Rosier entered Tour de France automobile, but with no luck of finishing. In 1957 Jean Estager with Lucille Estager scored a second place overall and class victory at the Rally Akropolis.

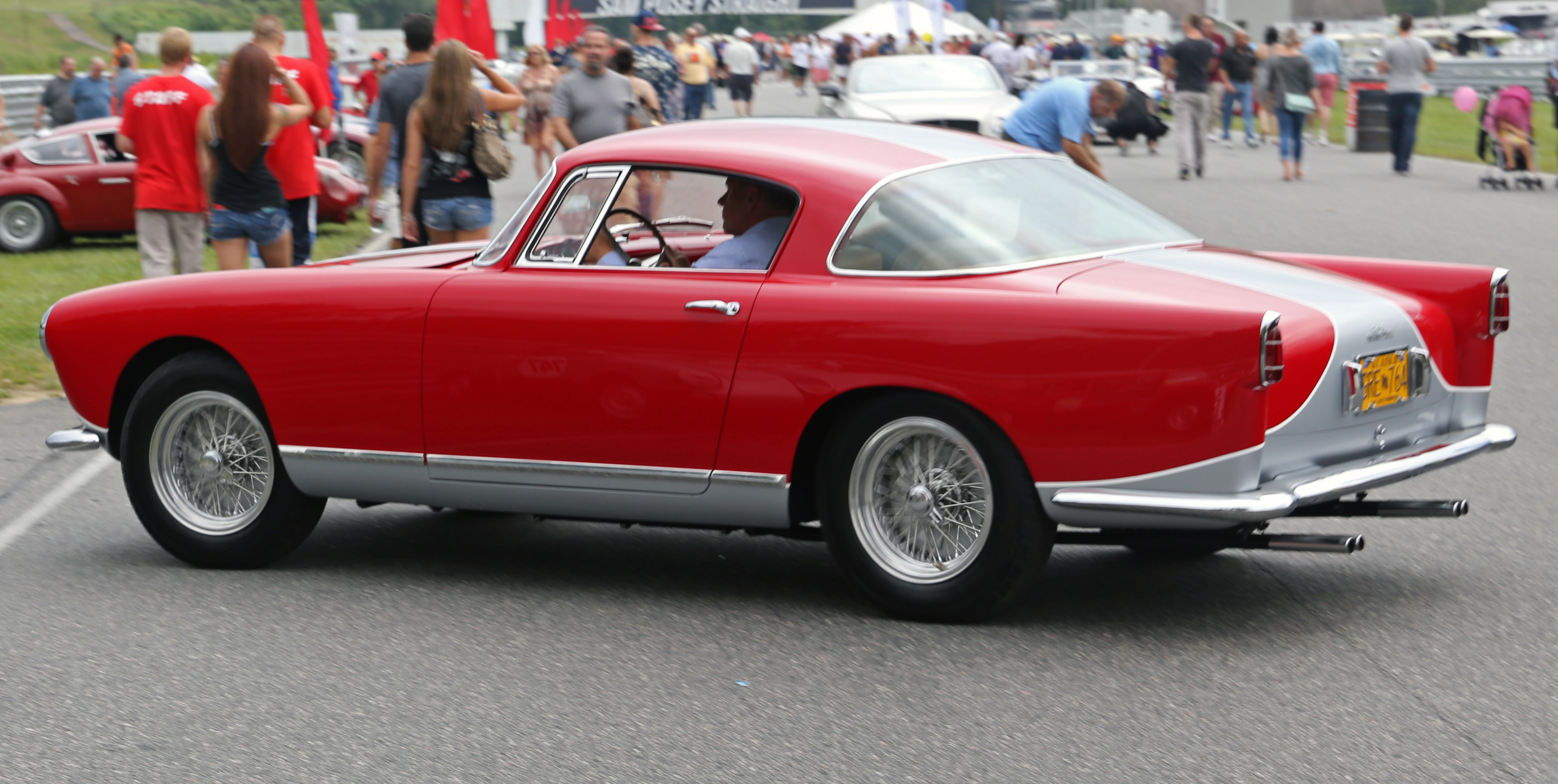
1955 Ferrari 250 GT Coupé Boano 'low-roof' Competizione s/n 0447GT

Chassis 0447GT, was another Competizione, bodied in alluminium by Boano, even though it had a Pinin Farina body number assigned. Under the bonnet was a type 112 engine. It was owned by Camillo Luglio, best known for ordering a series of special Zagato-bodied Berlinettas. He and Elfo Frignani entered it in the 1956 Mille Miglia, but did not finish the race. Later the same year, Luglio won a third place and a class victory at the Trofeo Internazionale della Sardegna. After its competition stint, the car was updated to the ‘unbroken waistline’ of other Boano creations.

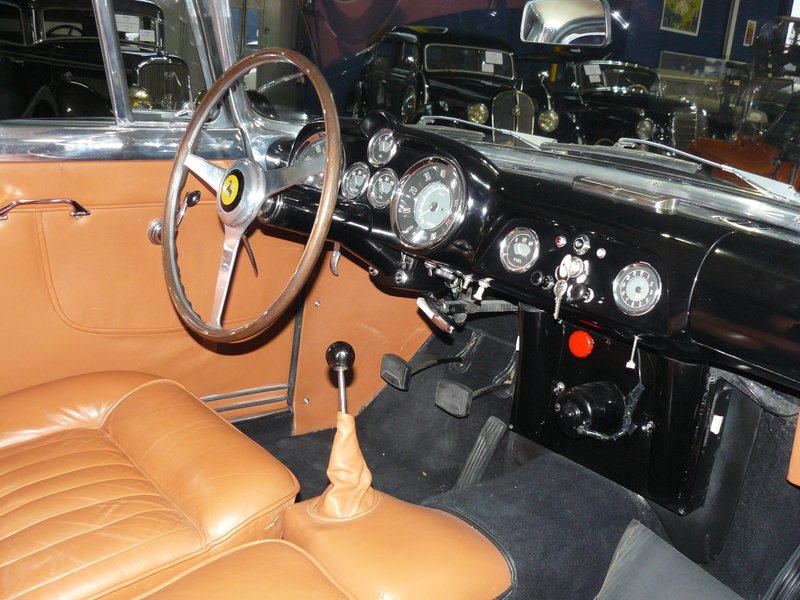
Boano interior

S/n 0627GT was originally a steel-bodied coupé, that was converted in 1959 by Scaglietti as a California Spyder ‘LWB’ under the ownership of an American actor James Cagney.

====== Speciale ======
S/n 0461GT was the first Carrozzeria Boano-bodied Ferrari. Styled by Felice Mario Boano as a one-off cabriolet based on the type 508 chassis. The car was created between 1955 and 1956, and when presented to Enzo Ferrari had cemented their credentials as a competent coachbuilder to receive the Coupé production contract. The style was the same as Ferrari 410 Superamerica Boano Cabriolet and presented at the 1956 Geneva Motor Show, and later at Turin and New York Motor Shows.

Chassis 0531GT was given a unique bodywork from Boano. The design was a blend of American and Italian styles, with chromed front grille with a prancing horse in a circle and sharply ending tail fins with horizontal slats between them. Exterior colour was copper with silver accents.

====== GTO Prototype ======
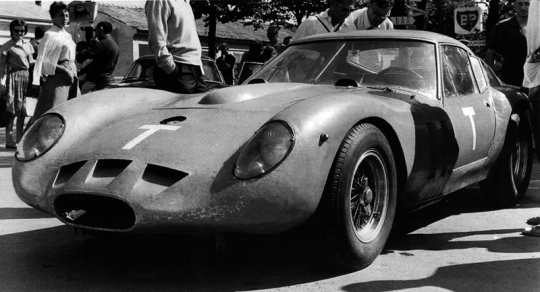
Ferrari 250 GTO prototype in 1961

Some sources indicate that chassis 0523GT was used as basis for a Ferrari 250 GTO prototype, although other sources state that a 250 GT SWB chassis may have been used. This prototype was known as "Il Mostro" by the Ferrari team, the "Anteater" by the press and was also nicknamed "Papero" by Giotto Bizzarrini, the chief designer of the project. Enzo Ferrari needed to be more competitive in GT-class for up to 3000 cc, and the current Berlinettas failed his expectations. Ferrari challenged Bizzarrini to create a new competition car that could beat Carlo Chiti's Sperimentale Berlinetta s/n 2643GT, and in complete secrecy from Chiti and Scaglietti. Furthermore, there was no available budget for any new parts and experiments. Giotto Bizzarrini started work on an old company car, the 250 GT Coupé Boano, that has been Enzo Ferrari's personal car up to 1957.

The wheelbase was shortened to the Berlinetta SWB measurements of 2,400 mm (94.5 in), and the chassis was strengthened to improve stiffness. The weight distribution was improved by moving the engine back and lowering it. The body was hand-crafted without any help of Scaglietti due to secrecy of the project, and so it remained in unpainted aluminium-alloy.

Very important innovations were applied to the aerodynamics of the car. Both by lowering the front of the car and also by improving the air-flow through the engine compartment. Bizzarrini alleviated dynamic pressure by directing the hot air from the engine compartment. This led to the creation of the iconic triple opening portholes in the front of the car that were so characteristic for the production GTO. They were used to divert air to the sides of the engine compartment to minimise pressure.

Willy Mairesse was able to test the car at Monza within two months of the beginning of the project. Further tests by Stirling Moss proved very successful even though the car used a wet sump lubrication system. Moss was able to beat the Berlinetta times by four–five seconds a lap. The project would later become the 250 GTO. In the end Enzo Ferrari ordered the car to be destroyed as a result of 'The Great Walkout' by the end of 1961, and did not want Bizzarrini to keep the car.

==== Ellena Coupé ====
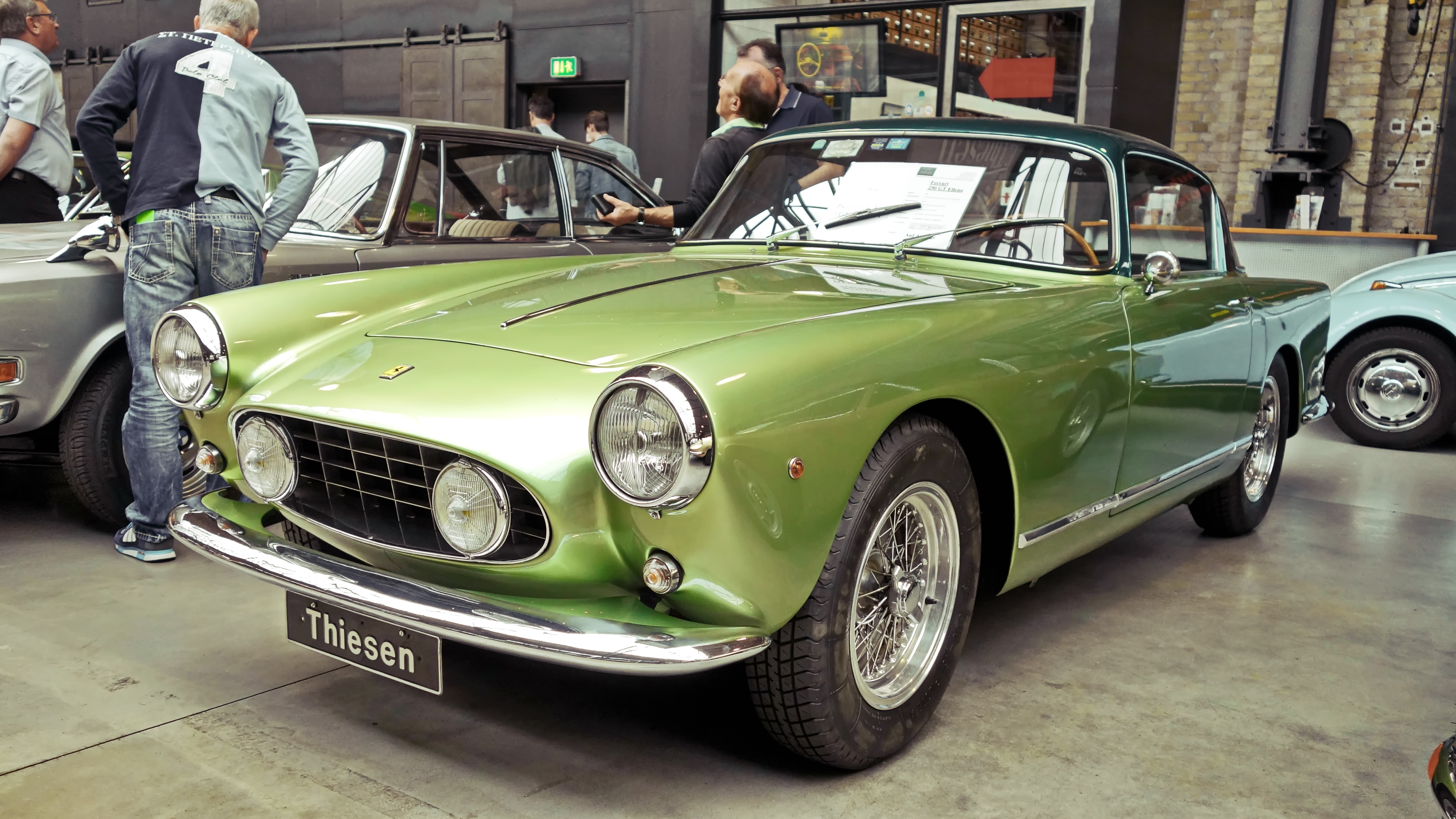
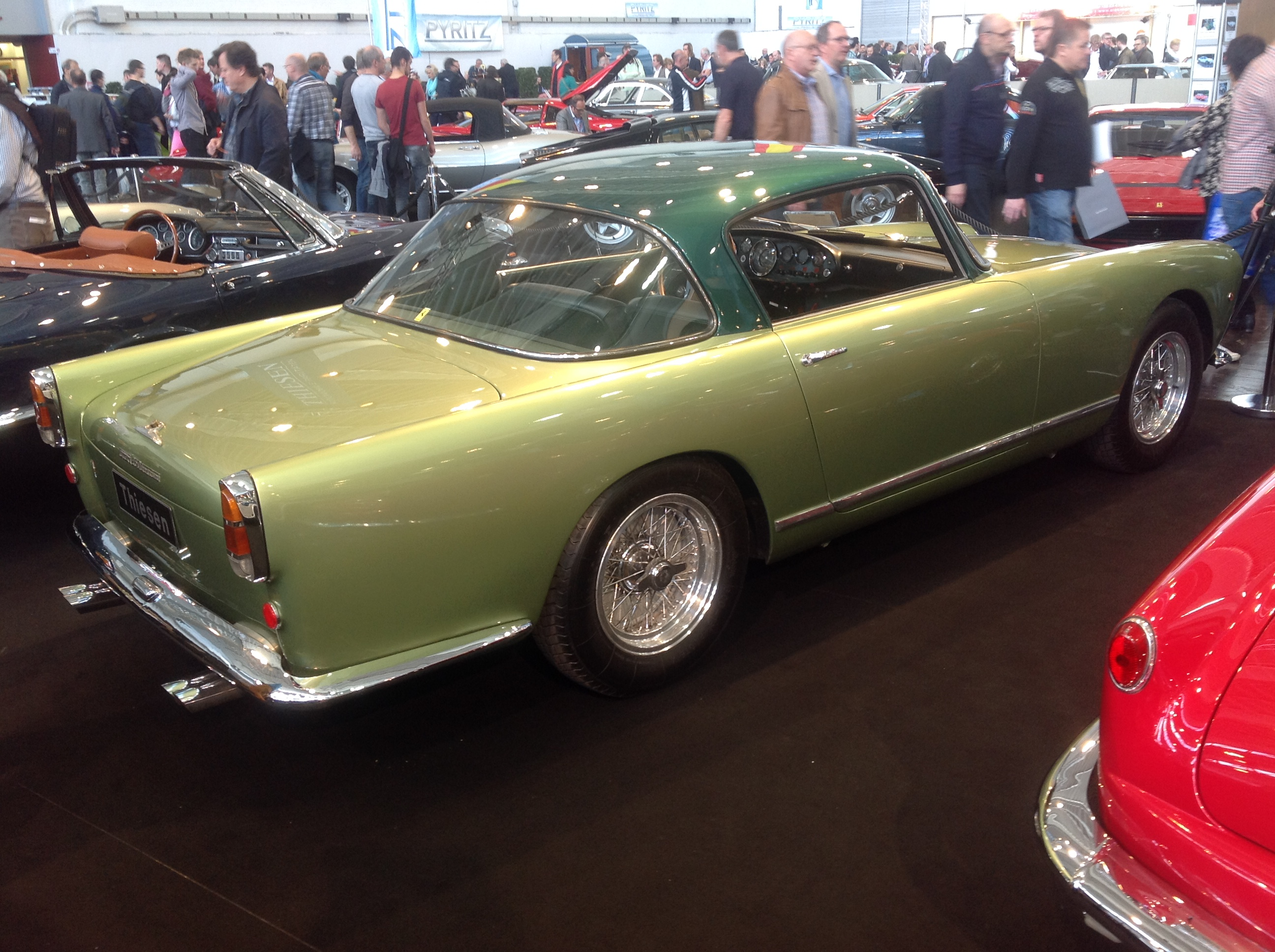
1958 Ferrari 250 Coupé Ellena, ‘high-roof’

In 1957 Mario Boano was invited to run the Fiat Centro Stile as a chief stylist. He passed the body production work to his son-in-law, Ezio Ellena, and his former partner Luciano Pollo. They renamed the company Carrozzeria Ellena, and continued to coachbuild Ferrari coupés. Carrozzeria Ellena ultimately closed down in 1966.

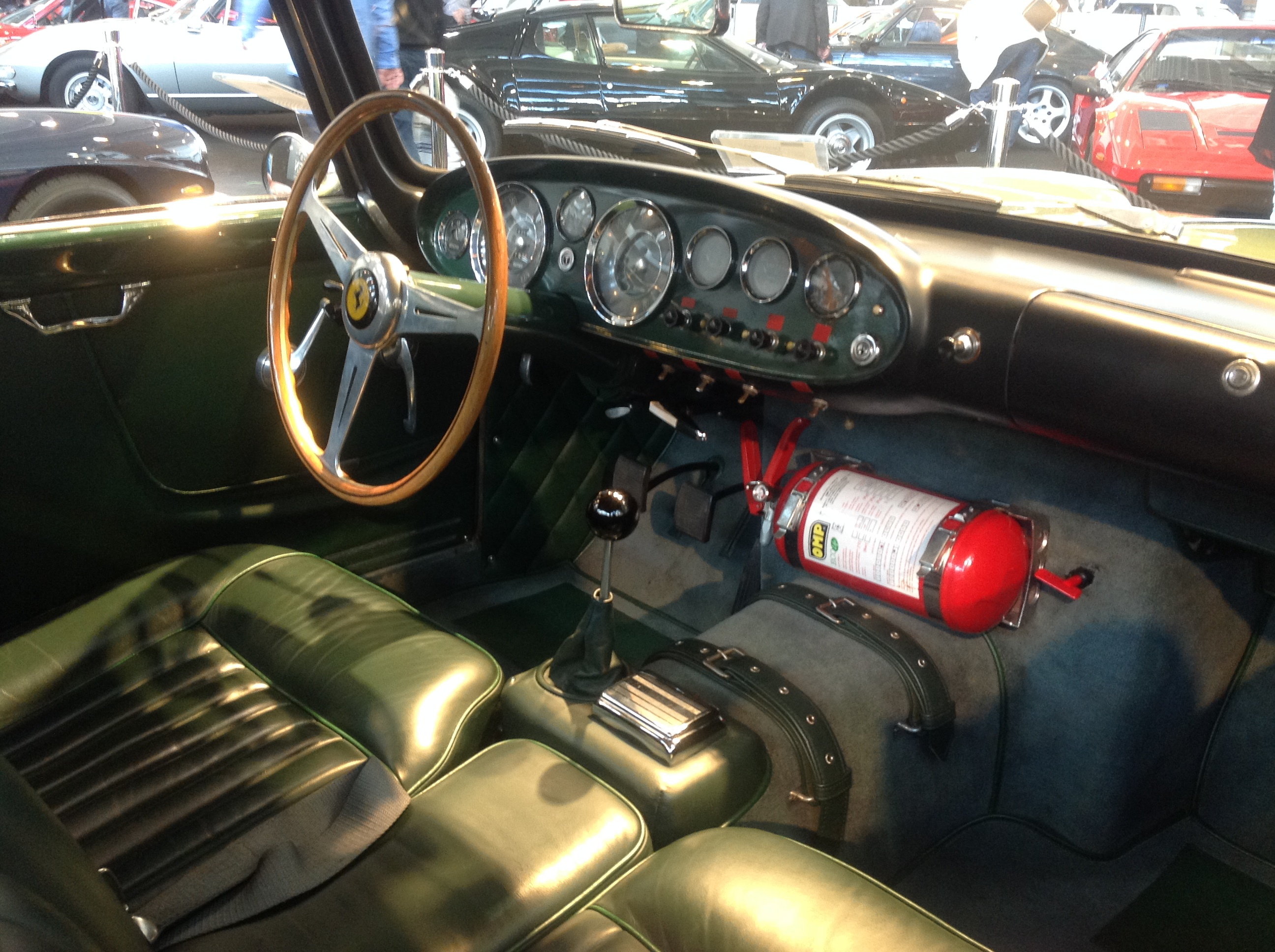
Ellena interior

The new series of cars from Carrozzeria Ellena will be known as the ‘250 GT Coupé Ellena’, and apart for some early examples, can be identified by a raised roof line and an absence of quarterlights. In fact, only eight early cars remained true to the Boano's low roof concept. Ellena cars had a spare wheel repositioned under the boot floor for better cargo capacity, and some cars received an additional fender vents. Other changes included a standard shift gate, as on some Boano cars the gate was reversed. Cabin heater was standard with no extras listed. Cars also received bigger brakes for everyday usability and stopping power. All high-roof cars upgraded their chassis and engines codes to 508C and 128C, respectively. Carrozzeria Ellena built a total of fifty cars before Pinin Farina took back its prime spot as a main coachbuilder.

===== Notable examples =====
A number of cars were converted into an open sports racers or Berlinettas along the way. With particular example s/n 0757GT, converted into an exact replica of a ‘Double Bubble’ Berlinetta Zagato by Carrozzeria Zagato in the 1990s.

====== Speciale ======
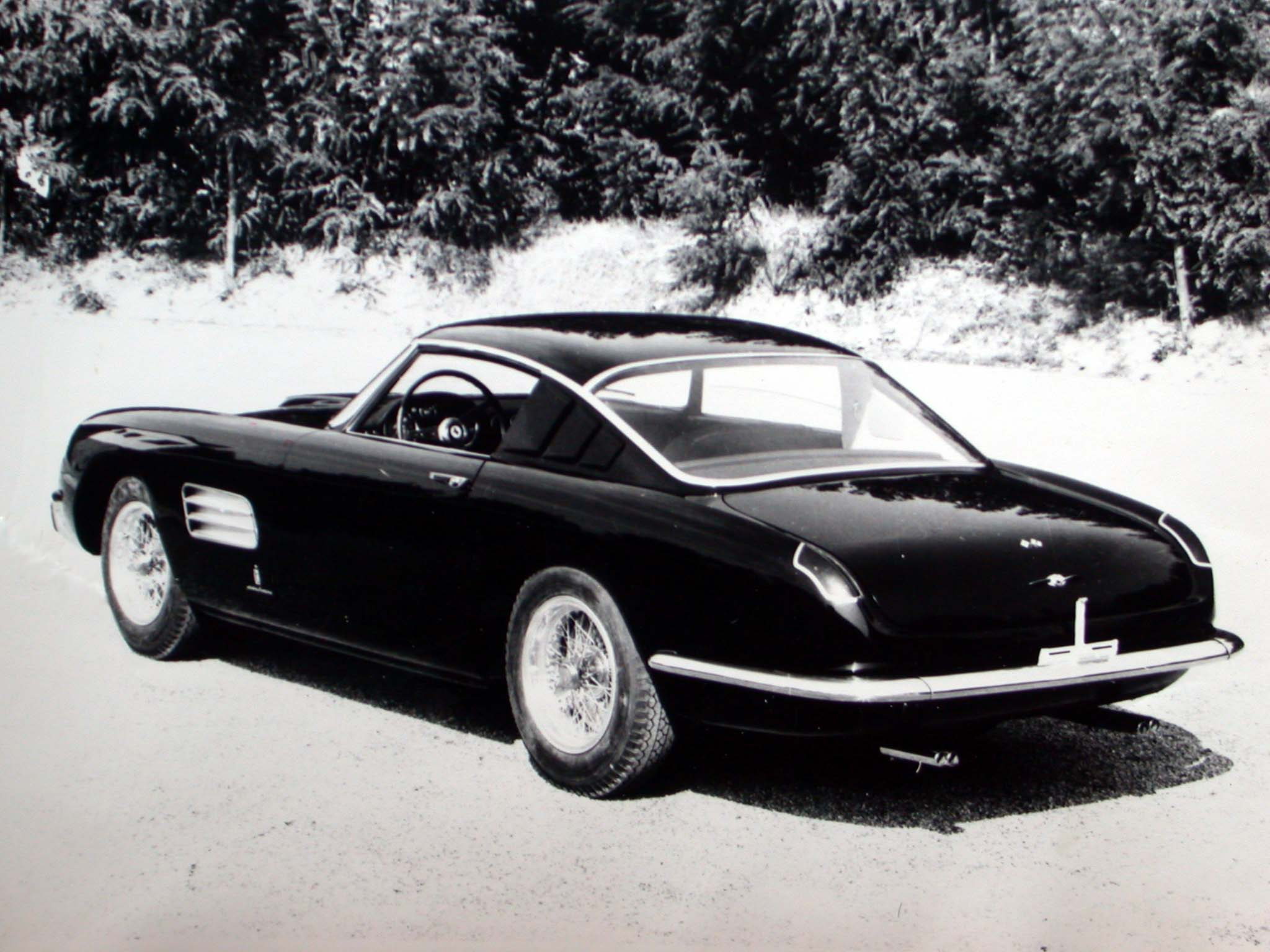
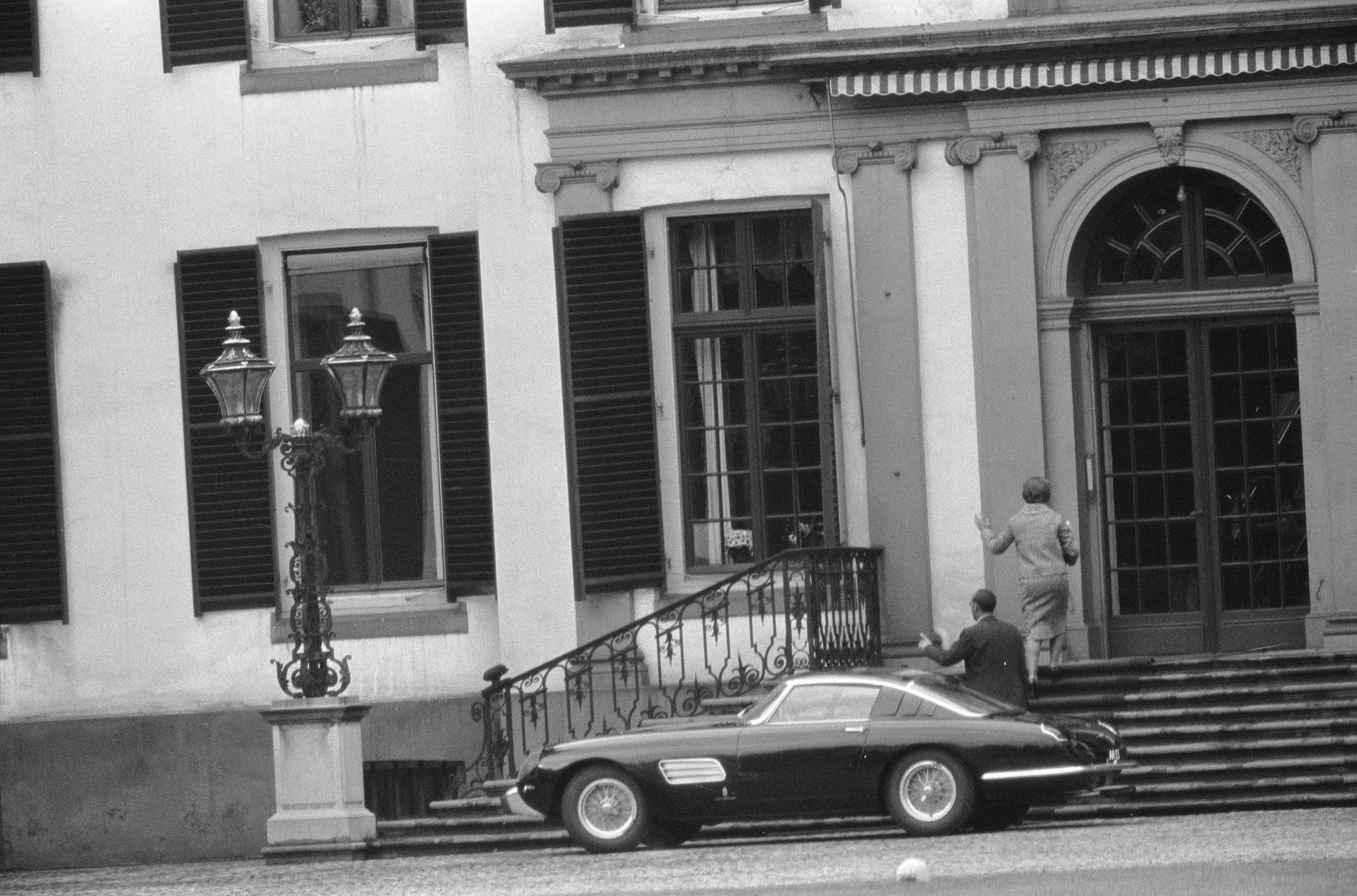
1957 Ferrari 250 GT Pinin Farina Coupé Speciale s/n 0725GT

Chassis 0725GT received a special coachwork by Pinin Farina. Designed as a close copy of their 4.9 Superfast s/n 0719SA, with long low bonett, wide oval grille and three rear louvre vents. Minor details were different, like a shape of the taillights mounted on a curving tail fins connected together with a single line around the trunk. It was sold new to Prince Bernhard of the Netherlands.

S/n 0751GT was another unique Ferrari ordered by Princess Lilian, Princess of Réthy of Belgium. The Coupé Speciale body was inspired by then current 410 Superamerica series, with elements of 250 GT Cabriolet and many distinct features. The front was elongated and the grille was flat and wide with small protruding bumperettes on each end. Headlamps were coverent in a competition berlinetta style. The rear fenders had squared fins with geometric tail lights. Contrary to similar Pinin Farina projects, this car was devoid of the rear louvre vents. Many design features would be soon seen on the production 250 GT Coupé by Pinin Farina. In January 1958, the Coupé Speciale was delivered to the Princess’ Waterloo home.

Princess de Réthy was renowned for her charitable work and while visiting a hospital, met with an American cardio-vascular surgeon Dr. Michael DeBakey, known for his surgery on the Shah of Iran. His brother Ernest was also a Ferrari enthusiast. Princess decided to bestow on him her Coupé Speciale as a gift, which he politely refused, but by the end of the year he received the car upon his return home.

==== Specifications ====
Boano-built series of Coupés saw a transition from type 112 Europa GT Colombo-designed V12 engine, to the type 128B introduced in 1956, and then 128C for Ellena. Early Pinin Farina-bodied cars still carried over the type 112 engine. The type 128 engines were now rated at 240 PS (177 kW; 237 hp). New were also triple 36DCF Weber carburettors.

Chassis setup remained the same, only with updated internal codes corresponding to new engine types. Suspension was upgraded on the front to double wishbones with coil springs, instead of transverse lower leaf springs; and at the rear to live axle with semi-elliptic leaf springs, in place of longitudinal leaf springs.

=== Pinin Farina Coupé ===
Ferrari 250 GT Coupé Pinin Farina
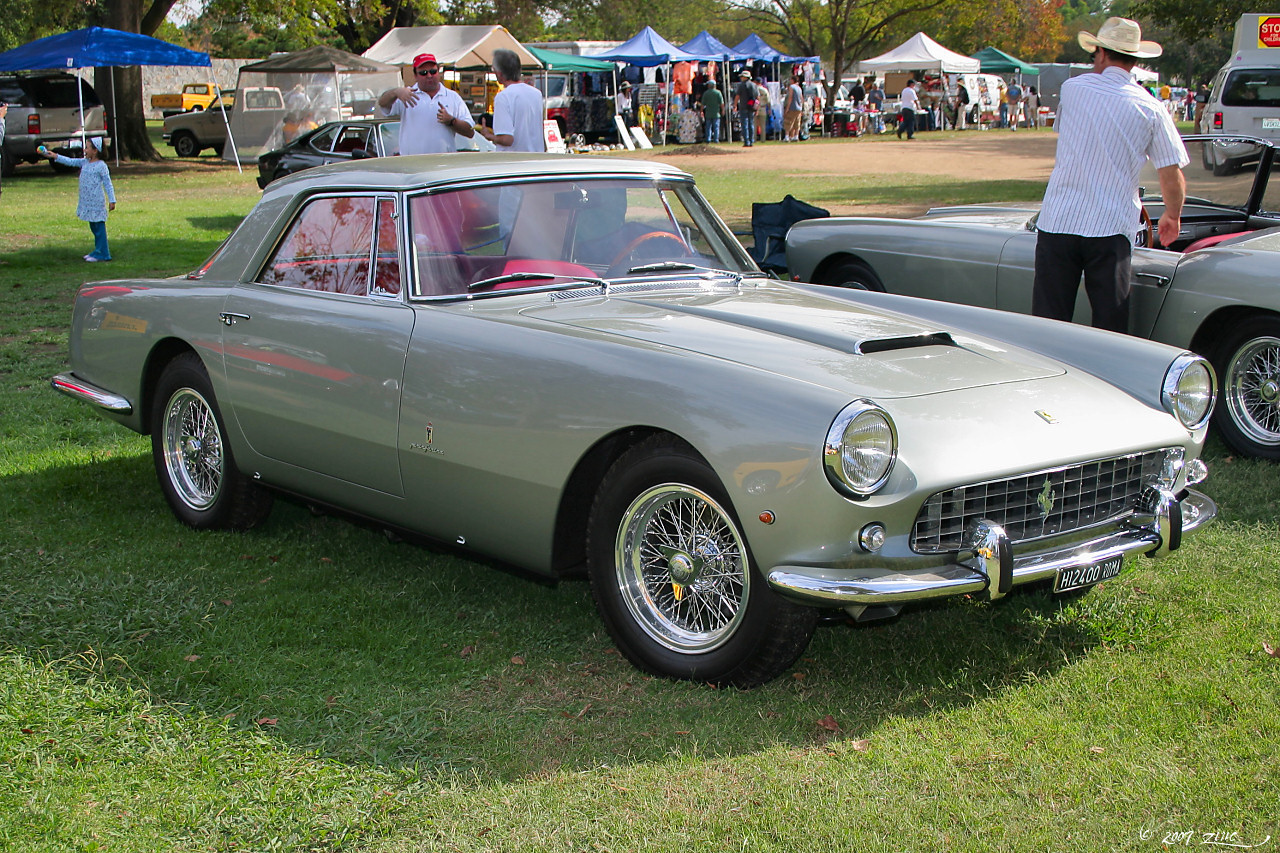
- Ferrari 250 GT Coupé Pinin Farina

Overview
- Production: 1958–1960; 353 produced
- Designer: Carrozzeria Pinin Farina

Body and chassis
- Related: Ferrari 250 GT Cabriolet

Powertrain
- Engine: 3.0 L (2953.21 cc) Tipo 128 Colombo V12
- Power output: 240 PS

Dimensions
- Length: 4,700 mm (185.0 in)
- Width: 1,725 mm (67.9 in)
- Height: 1,340 mm (52.8 in)
- Curb weight: 1,230 kg (2,712 lb)

The Ferrari 250 GT Coupé Pinin Farina was a GT car produced by Ferrari in 1958–1960. It features a brand new body compared to its predecessors and virtually identical mechanical layout. All this with a goal of greatly increasing production output. It was the first semi-series produced Ferrari model to date.

==== Development ====
History

Carrozzeria Pinin Farina was in cooperation with Ferrari as a coachbuilder since 1952. From that time only small bodywork orders were realized. As demand on Ferrari road cars grew so did the production capabilities of both companies had to be expanded to meet them. Unable to fulfill a large contract Pinin Farina decided to build a brand new factory in Grugliasco, on the outskirts of Turin. Production

After the subcontract of Boano and Ellena ended by 1958, Pinin Farina was ready with a new Coupé design and a new factory to increase body production. The Ferrari 250 GT Coupé Pinin Farina would be the largest volume Ferrari model up to that time. The change from an artisan-type construction to a semi-industrialised type meant that the car's shape had to be designed with greater simplicity of body production.

Design

Initially, two or three prototypes were constructed with panoramic rear window, a shape that was well established in Pinin Farina style, and very slight kick-up fenders. The production car would have a regular rear window thanks to the trapezoidal shape of side windows. Front of the car was long and flat with a wide grille, a far evolution from the dominant ’egg-crate’ style of Europa GT. Because of the lower front bonett the optical groups protruded more distinctly. Side flanks were flat and undisturbed only divided vertically by a dihedral line. The fastback profile of the predecessors was replaced with a ‘notch back’ style. The simplistic design was accented by a lack of additional ornamentation. Overall the design was commended for being well proportioned. The new design was first shown to the press in June 1958, and later launched at the Paris Motor Show, in October the same year. Before that it was secretly entered in concours d’elegance in Antibes.

==== Notable examples ====
Chassis 0797GT was the first prototype, completed in 1957, it featured side vents and a panoramic rear window. S/n 0841GT was the second prototype, also with panoramic rear window and with horizontal tail lights, that production model would have mounted on top of rear fins. Chassis 0843GT wa the third prototype.

S/n 1499GT completed in late 1959 was the first Coupé with factory fitted disc brakes.

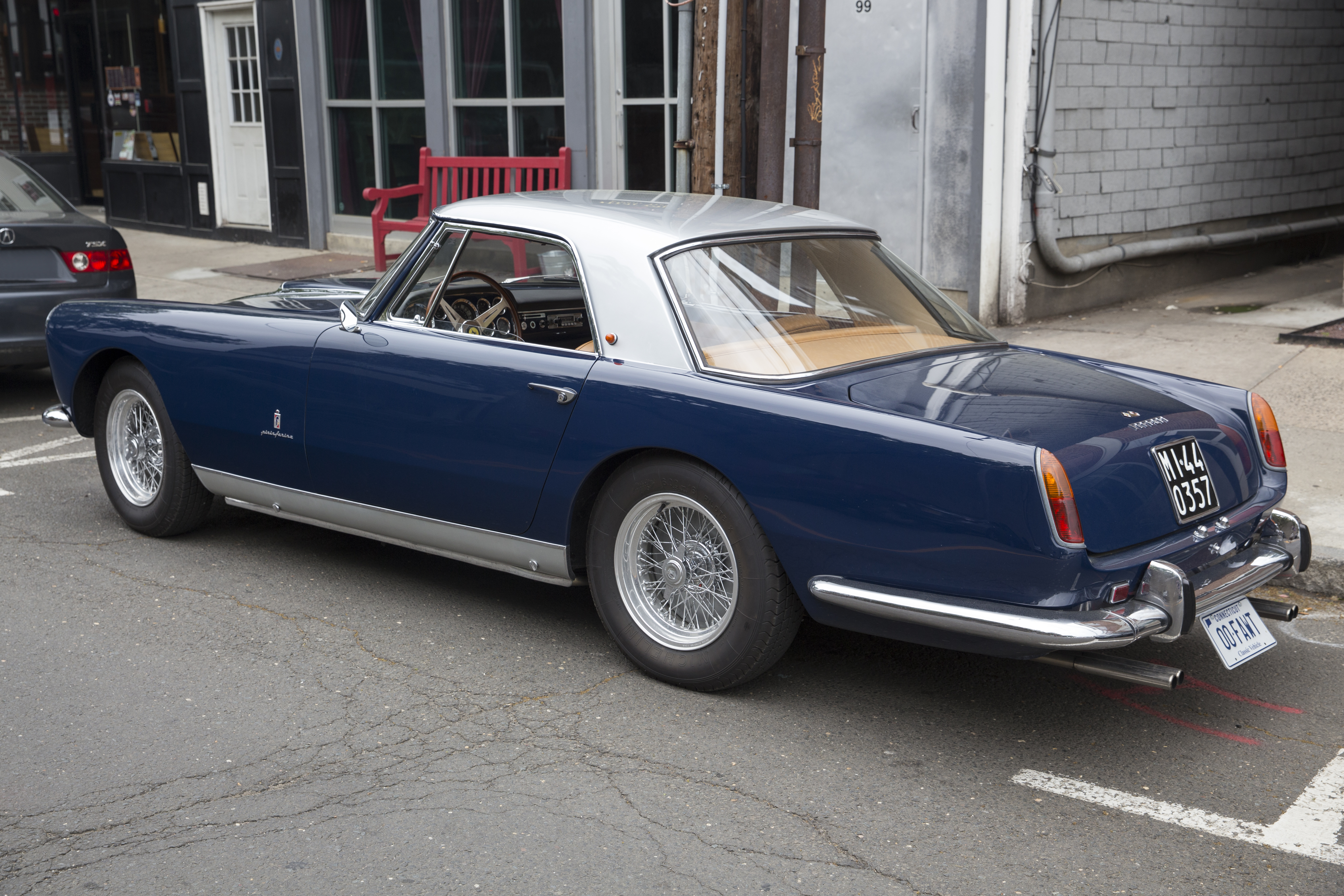
Rear view

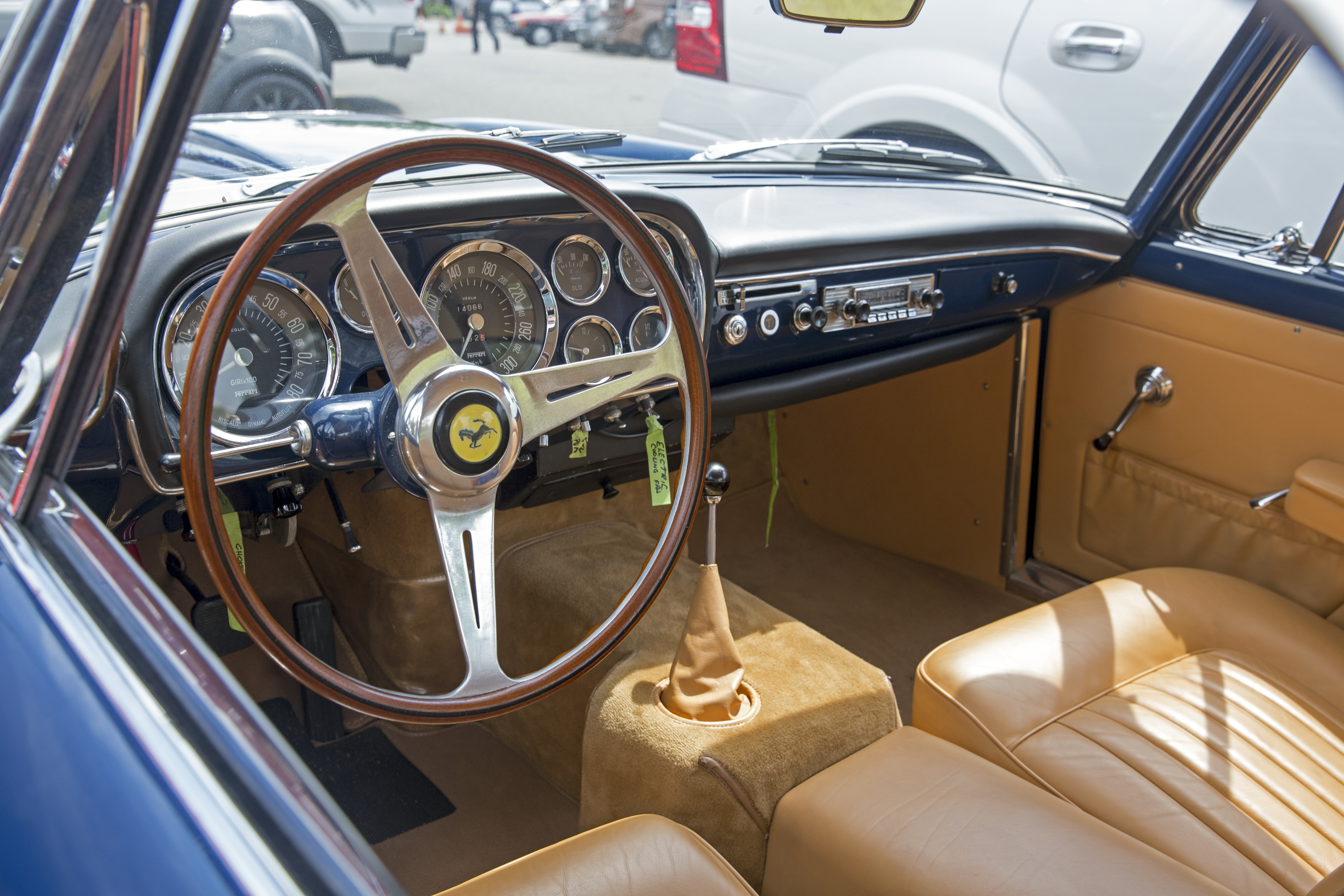
GT Pinin Farina Coupé interior

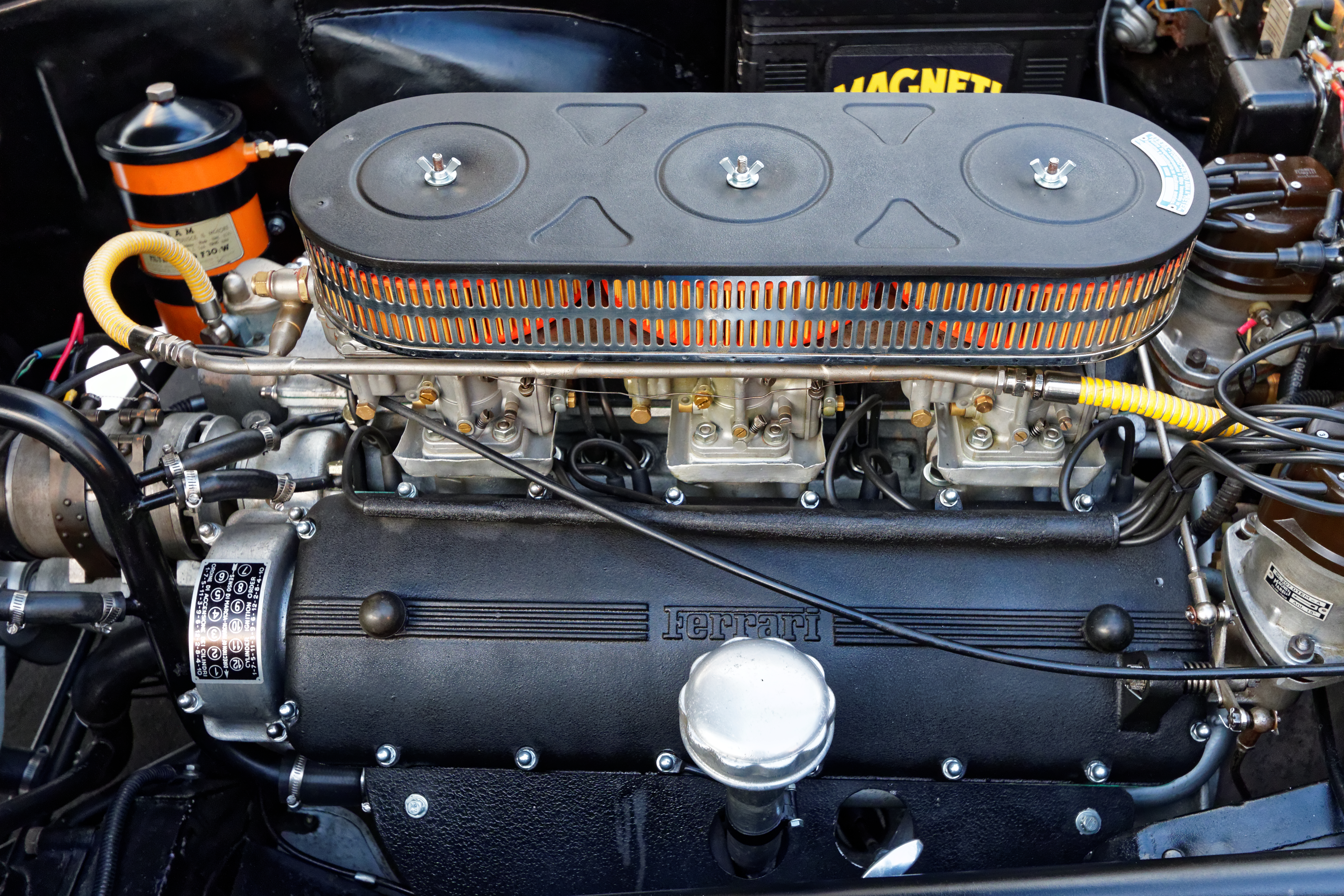
Type 128D Colombo 3.0-litre V12 engine. Twin distributors and three Weber carburettors visible.

===== Speciale =====
Chassis 0853GT, finished in 1958 as a very early example, received a special body with additional rear quarterlight, making it a five-window coupé, and a steeply inclined rear window. Tail lights were mounted horizontally, unlike on a production model. Its first owner was Prince Bertil, Duke of Halland from Sweden.

S/n 1187GT, was a one-off Coupé Speciale similar from the side to the third series 410 Superamerica by Pini Farina but without covered headlamps and with flat bonett. A five-window coupé with a production car's front and rear and additional side fender vents. The car was presented at the 1959 Geneva Motor Show. It was then owned by Emanuele Nasi, from Agnelli family.

1960 chassis 1751GT received a special set of bespoke details. The car had covered headlamps like on a competition car, side fender vents and smaller half-bumpers.

===== Notable conversions =====
As values of the 250 GT Coupés dropped, some cars were either parted out for spares or relatively inexpensively converted into other creations, replicas or competition models. Some were even scrapped. It is estimated that only half may be still surviving.

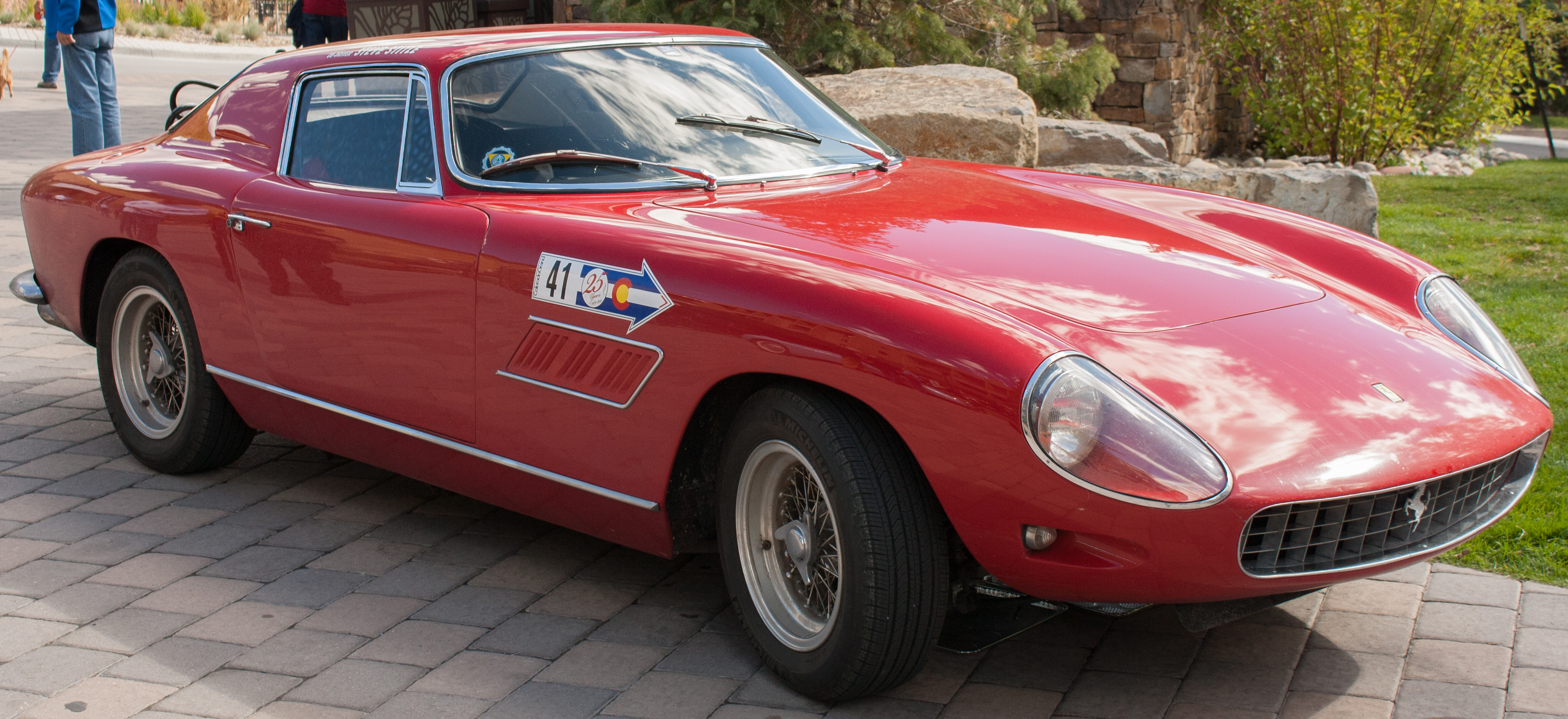
Period conversion by Piero Drogo's Carrozzeria Sports Cars, s/n 0977GT

S/n 0977GT was rebodied in period as a fastback coupé Piero Drogo's Carrozzeria Sports Cars for Pierre de Siebenthal and bodied in full lightweight alloy. Very narrow grille stretched almost the full width of the front. A previously crashed Coupé s/n 1717GT from 1960, had its chassis shortened by Vaccari workshop in 1965 and was rebodied by Piero Drogo's Carrozzeria Sports Cars to resemble a 250 GTO. Engine received six Weber carburettor upgrade. Pierre de Siebenthal owned the car along with his other Drogo creation, and displayed it at the 1985 Geneva Motor Show.

In 1967 Tom Meade took the Coupé s/n 1065GT, rebodied completely with his own design and dubbed it ‘Thomassima III’. The car also featured a gullwing doors.

The chassis taken from s/n 1393GT was rebodied by Fantuzzi as a 250 Testa Rossa.

Chassis 1623GT was rebodied in 1964 by Neri and Bonacini from Modena as a "Nembo Coupé" for Tom Meade in lightweight coachwork. S/n 1777GT was rebodied in 1965 by Neri and Bonacini, as Nembo Spyder. Car was created for Tom Meade's customer, Sergio Braidi. The unique styling was a combination of 275 GTB and 250 GTO. Engine was modified with six double-barrel Weber carburettors.

==== Specifications ====
Engine

Throughout the production run of the Pinin Farina Coupé, the Colombo V12 engine received numerous upgrades. The original type 128C with a single distributor and an 'inside plug' was updated to twin distributor type 128D, still with an 'inside plug' and siamese inlet ports. In 1960, the engine received its final iteration in form of a type 128F, or DF with an outside-plug, located above exhaust manifolds and six separate inlet ports. Fuel was fed by three 36DCZ3 Weber carburettors. Some were later upgraded to type 40DCL6. Maximum power was still rated at 240 PS (177 kW; 237 hp).

Chassis

Chassis codes corresponded with the engine types. The biggest update was an installation of disc brakes made by Dunlop in late 1959. Offset shifter was replaced by a central shift with electrically operated overdrive made by Laycock de Normanville. Brakes were servo-assisted thanks to a company called Bendix. Telescopic dampers were introduced in place of lever type. Most of the improvements were much needed and welcomed as they increased usability and serviceability greatly.

== 250 GT Coupé Speciale ==
Ferrari 250 GT Coupé Speciale

Overview
- Production: 1956; 4 produced
- Designer: Carrozzeria Pinin Farina

Powertrain
- Engine: 3.0 L (2953.21 cc) Tipo 128 Colombo V12
- Power output: 240 PS

Dimensions
- Wheelbase: 2,600 mm (102.4 in)

In 1956 Pinin Farina produced a special series of only four cars individually bodied for wealthy customers and based on a unique type 513 chassis.

=== Development ===
Even though Carrozzeria Boano subcontracted the 250 GT Coupé body production, some of the chassis were sent to Carrozzeria Pinin Farina for individual coachwork. Four such cars were subsequently bodied in a 410 Superamerica-style seen as more muscular than its siblings. Significant changes included a shorter by 200 mm (7.9 in) wheelbase, compared to Superamerica. It underwent the same treatment as with Europa GT, having the distance from the front wheel arch and A-post reduced and the overall style carried over. One of the Speciales was presented at the 1956 Geneva Motor Show along the first prototype for the Boano Coupé. Due to its striking similarity with 410 Superamerica, some sourced indicate the other model was being shown there.

The 250 GT Coupé Speciale by Pinin Farina produced in only four examples became noted for its rarity and classic Pinin Farina styling. Because those were highly customised special order cars, they were built with many custom features, including special gauges, telescopic-adjusted steering wheel or a special bolstered seats. Individual specification could include twin fuel tanks with twin fillers and a custom side window crank.

=== Specifications ===
The Coupé Speciale sported a type 128 Colombo V12 engine, rated at 240 PS (177 kW; 237 hp). The Speciale was based on a different chassis than other Coupés with their own, unique for the series, designation type 513, that also had a 2,600 mm (102.4 in) of wheelbase. Suspension setup was almost identical to the Boano-era Coupés. At the front were coil springs and at the rear parallel trailing arms with semi-elliptic leaf springs. A four-speed manual gearbox and a four-wheel hydraulic drum brakes were standard on all coupés from that era.

=== Examples ===
S/n 0463GT was the first Coupé Speciale to be built on a type 513 chassis. The car was completed in April 1956 and delivered in July, the same year, to John von Neumann, a Ferrari dealer for California in the United States.

S/n 0465GT was the second of the four Speciales. Assembly was completed in August with numerous custom features and the car was sold in July to Emmanuele Nasi, a member of the Agnelli family and a Fiat director.

Chassis 0467GT, was the third car of the series and was the only one sporting side fender vents, just like those on the Superamerica. Its first owner was Fernando Galvao from Lisbon, Portugal.

The last produced Coupé Speciale, s/n 0469GT finished in light blue Celeste colour, was delivered new to the King Mohammed V of Morocco.

== Collectability ==
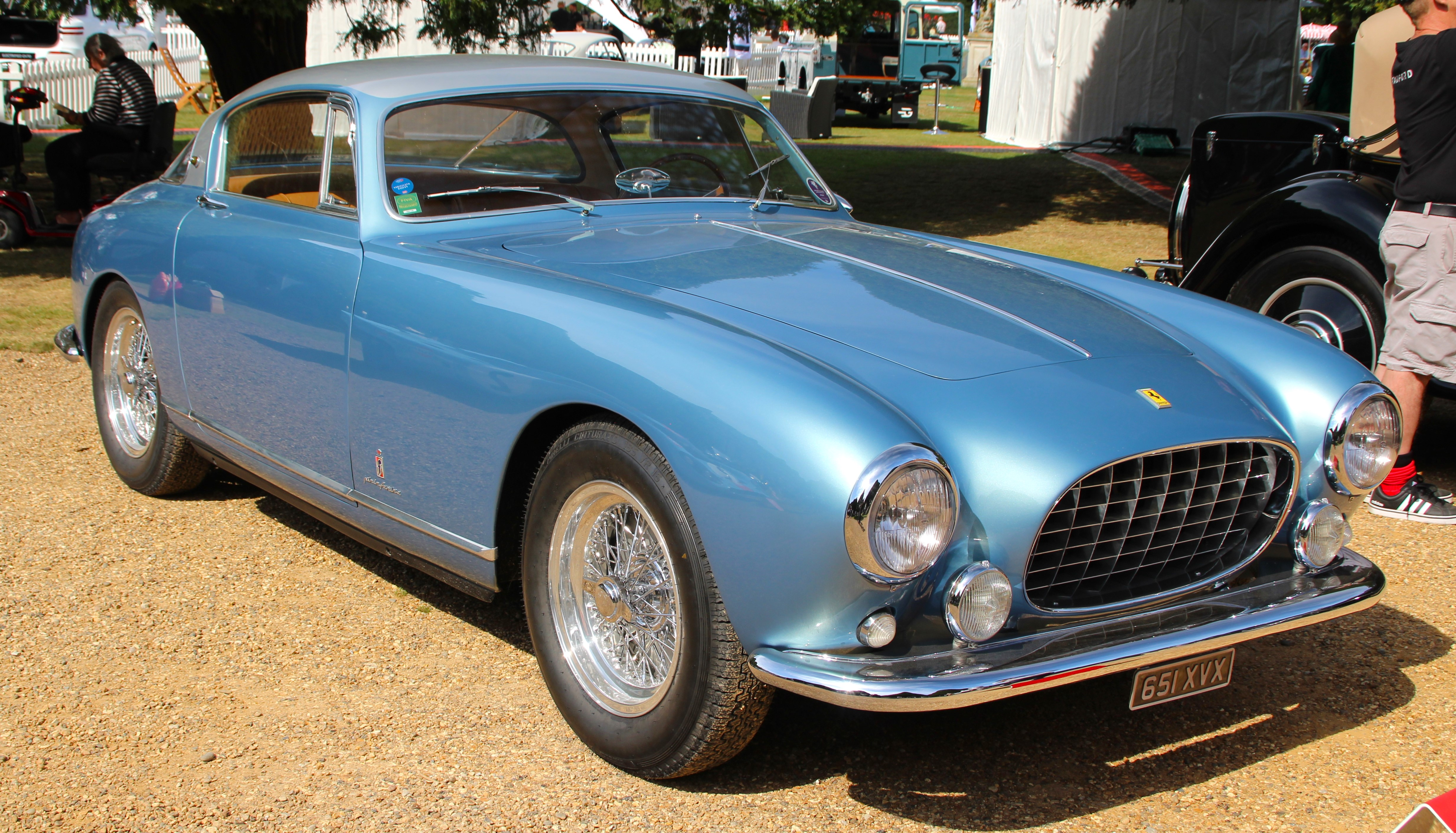
0377GT at Hampton Court in September 2023

The 1954 250 Europa GT, chassis 0377GT, was offered by RM Sotheby's at their Arizona 2020 auction and estimated between US$1.5 – US$1.7 million. A one-off custom designed 1955 250 Europa GT, s/n 0407GT, was sold by RM Auctions in New York in 2013 for US$2.42 million. The unrestored 1955 250 Europa GT, chassis 0409GT was sold on Gooding's Amelia Island 2014 auction for US$2.53 million. The 1955 250 Europa GT, s/n 0405GT, was sold on Gooding's Scottsdale 2012 auction for US$797,500. The 1955 250 Europa GT Competizione, chassis 0415GT, formerly owned by Marquis Alfonso de Portago was sold on Gooding's Pebble Beach 2013 auction for US$7.15 million.

The 1956, fourth of nine, prototype by Pinin Farina of a 250 GT Coupé, s/n 0435GT was sold for US$1.485 million on RM Sotheby's Monterey 2015 auction. The 1955 Ferrari 250 GT Competizione Coupé, all-alloy, chassis 0447GT was offered by RM Sotheby's in Arizona in 2015 at an estimate of US$1.75 – US$2.25 million. The 1956 Ferrari 250 GT Coupé Boano s/n 0581GT, that emerged after 35 years of storage was sold on Gooding's Pebble Beach 2019 auction for US$522,000.

The 1959 Ferrari 250 GT Coupé, s/n 1315GT was sold on Gooding's Scottsdale 2019 auction for US$599,000. The final example of the Pinin Farina-bodied Coupés from 1960, chassis 2081GT, was sold on Gooding's Amelia Island auction in 2019 for US$335,000. A one-off 1958 250 GT Coupé Speciale, s/n 1187GT was sold on Gooding's Scottsdale auction in 2013 for US$2.365 million. The 1957 250 GT Coupé Speciale by Pinin Farina, a one-off coachwork for Lilian, Princess of Réthy on chassis 0751GT, was offered on RM Sotheby's Arizona auction in 2019 at an estimate of US$11 – US$13 million.

One of only four, 1956 Ferrari 250 GT Coupé Speciale by Pinin Farina, chassis 0465GT, was sold on RM Auctions at the Amelia Island in 2012 for US$1.43 million.

== See also ==
- Ferrari 250

== Bibliography ==
- Acerbi, Leonardo (2012). Ferrari: All The Cars. Haynes Publishing. ISBN 978-1-84425-581-8.
- Schlegelmilch, Rainer W. (2004). Ferrari. Könemann. ISBN 3-8331-1057-0.
- Smale, Glen (2010). Ferrari Design: The Definitive Study. Haynes Publishing. ISBN 978-1-84425-487-3.
- Eaton, Godfrey (1983). Ferrari: The Road And Racing Cars. Haynes Publishing. ISBN 0-85429-367-1.
- Laban, Brian (2005). The Ultimate History of Ferrari. Parragon. ISBN 1-40545-690-6.
- Tuminelli, Paolo (2008). Luxury Toys: Classic Cars. teNeues Publishing Group. ISBN 978-3-8327-9201-5.
