= Fantuzzi =

Fantuzzi is a surname. Notable people with the surname include:

- Medardo Fantuzzi (1906–1986), Italian automotive engineer
- Antonio Fantuzzi (1510–1550), Italian painter and printmaker

== See also ==
- Ferrari 250 TR 61 Spyder Fantuzzi, a racecar
