= Ferrari Jano engine =

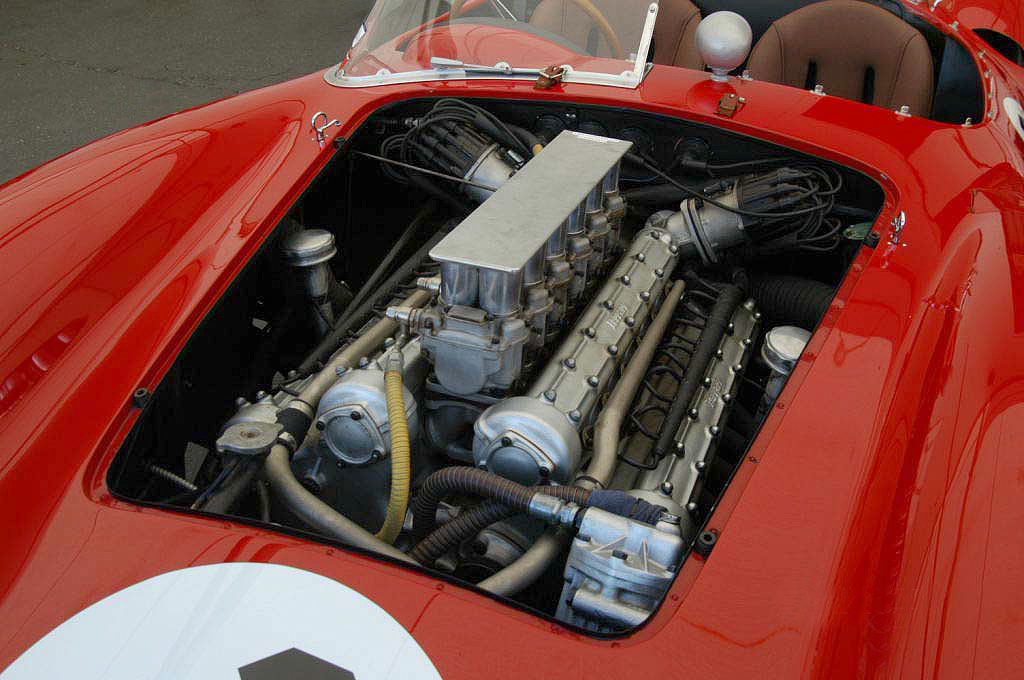
- Jano V12 engine in Ferrari 412 S

Overview
- Manufacturer: Ferrari
- Production: 1956–1958

Layout
- Configuration: 60° V12
- Displacement: 3.0 L (2,953 cc); 3.5 L (3,490 cc); 3.8 L (3,783 cc); 4.0 L (4,023 cc)
- Cylinder bore: 73 mm (2.9 in); 76 mm (3.0 in); 77 mm (3.0 in)
- Piston stroke: 58.8 mm (2.3 in); 69.5 mm (2.7 in); 72 mm (2.8 in)
- Cylinder block material: Aluminium
- Cylinder head material: Aluminium
- Valvetrain: SOHC, 24-valve DOHC, 24-valve
- Compression ratio: 9.0:1 - 9.9:1

Combustion
- Fuel system: Weber carburetor
- Fuel type: Petrol
- Oil system: Dry sump
- Cooling system: Water cooled

Chronology
- Predecessor: Ferrari Lampredi engine
- Successor: Ferrari Colombo engine

The Ferrari Jano V12 was a 60° V12 engine for sports car racing designed by Vittorio Jano for Ferrari and introduced in 1956. It combined elements of both Colombo and Lampredi V12s with new features. The dry sump, OHC design was produced only until 1958, in displacements from 3.0 L (2,953 cc) and 4.0 L (4,023 cc).

== Design ==
The engine architecture of the Ferrari Jano V12 was more of Lampredi school but retained smaller Colombo internal measurements. Jano moved to Ferrari along with his designs for the Lancia D50 in 1955 and went on to design not only a new V12 but also a family of the Dino V6 engines soon after. Some of the technical ideas came from the Jano's Lancia V8 DOHC engine, intended for Formula One. This family of engines replaced Lampredi inline-4s known from Ferrari Monza line and went on to win many international races and titles for Ferrari. The design team comprised Jano as well as Vittorio Bellentani, Alberto Massimino (best known for the Maserati 250F), and Andrea Fraschetti.

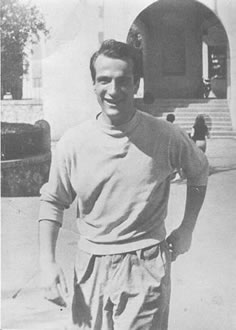
Andrea Fraschetti (1928–57), Ferrari engineer

All Jano engines used dry sump lubrication and almost all of them had two spark plugs per cylinder with four coils. Also most of them had DOHC configuration with chain-driven camshafts and two valves per cylinder.

== Applications ==
=== 290 MM ===
Type 130 was the first engine designed by Jano for Ferrari. Introduced in 1956 it remained the only SOHC in its V12 family. Bore and stroke was 73 mm by 69.5 mm for a total capacity of 3,490.61 cc (3.5 L; 213.0 cu in). At 9:1 compression ratio and, at first, with only three Weber 36 IR4/C1 carburettors this powerplant produced 320 PS (235 kW; 316 hp) at 7200 rpm and could achieve 280 km/h top speed. Only four cars were made, all bodied by Scaglietti as spyders. The Ferrari 290 MM that used this engine was a highly competitive race car at its time.

=== 290 S ===
Type 136 was introduced in 1957 for the Ferrari 290 S. Having same measurements as before (73 mm by 69.5 mm) and same capacity, this engine received a DOHC configuration. It was the first Ferrari sports racing car with a DOHC V12 engine, nine years before Colombo V12 received a quad-cam upgrade in 275 P2. Those twin camshafts per cylinder bank were inspired by the Lancia D50 Formula One car's engine, also designed by Vittorio Jano. With a new configuration also the fuel system was upgraded and now the 290 S sported six Weber 42DCN carburettors. The power grew slightly to 330 PS (243 kW; 325 hp), now at 8000 rpm. Compression and top speed remained the same. This car was very short lived and same year, after a couple of races, upgraded to the 315 specification.

=== 315 S ===
Type 140 was a first step forward in terms of capacity. Redesigned in 1957 and enlarged to 3,783.40 cc (3.8 L; 230.9 cu in) thanks to bigger 76 mm bore with the same stroke as before. Power output was now 360 PS (265 kW; 355 hp) at 7800 rpm. Same six Webers setup, compression ratio and spark plugs arrangement remained. Double camshafts per bank engine was not only more powerful than previous single-cam engines but also lighter and more reliable, which was important in long distance racing. The Ferrari 315 S with this engine won the last Mille Miglia in 1957.

=== 335 S ===
Type 141 also debuted in 1957 on the Ferrari 335 S. Having even bigger displacement than before at 4,023.32 cc (4.0 L; 245.5 cu in), this was also the last enlargement. Both bore and stroke were changed, now at 77 mm by 72 mm, respectively. Previous Weber carburettors were upgraded to 44 DCN type. Compression ratio was slightly upped to 9.2:1 which resulted in 390 PS (287 kW; 385 hp) at 7400 rpm of maximum power. The Ferrari 335 S equipped with this engine could top 300 km/h.

=== 312 S ===
Type 142 was very short lived installed in a single chassis ever produced. Due to tragic events at the Mille Miglia, new regulations forced limited displacement to 3.0 L for 1958 season. This new requirement-meeting engine had the same measurements as Colombo 250 at 73 mm by 58.8 mm resulting in total capacity of 2,953.21 cc (3.0 L; 180.2 cu in), difference being that this was a quad-cam configuration. Power output was 320 PS (235 kW; 316 hp) at 8400 rpm, that is 20 PS (15 kW) more than the 250 Testa Rossa from the same year. The only Jano V12 single spark plug engine with two magnetos. After only a single, unfinished race in the Spa Francorchamps Grand Prix in May 1958, the car was quickly converted into the 412 S.

=== 412 MI ===
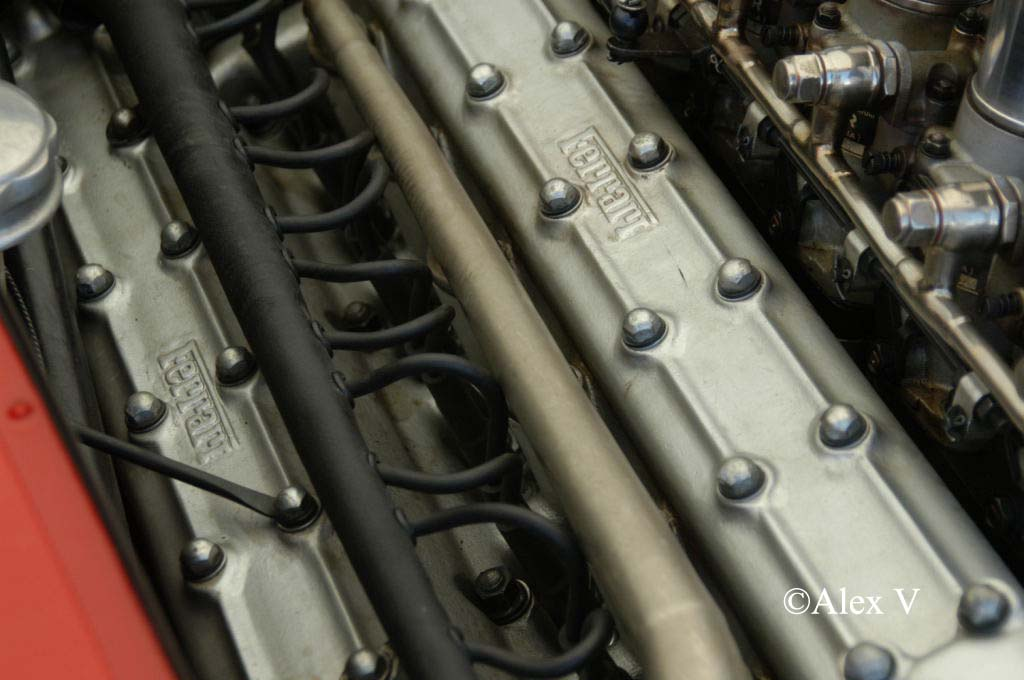
412 S engine closeup

The Ferrari 412 MI (MI for Monza Indianapolis) was one of only two Ferrari race cars, purpose-made for the 1958 500 Miles of Monza, a sort of Italian version of the Indianapolis 500. This single-seater used the 4.0 L engine from the 335 S. Now with a 9.9:1 compression ratio and a six Weber 42DCN carburettors, it could produce up to 447 PS (329 kW; 441 hp) at 7700 rpm. It was the most powerful of the Ferrari engines to date. Luigi Musso won qualifying at a record average speed of 280.8 km/h (174.5 mph). The actual race was divided into three heats and, with an aid from Phil Hill and Mike Hawthorn, the 412 MI was able to finish third overall, just behind two purpose-built American competitors.

=== 412 S ===
Type 141 again found its way into a sports racing chassis. This time as a result of a conversion from the 312 S in 1958. This model is usually confused with the 412 MI due to a similar name. The engine was based on the 4.0 L unit from the MI with a higher compression ratio and the same 42-type carburettors. It could produce an impressive 432 PS (318 kW; 426 hp) at 8000 rpm. The car was raced in California by Phil Hill, Richie Ginther and John von Neumann (Ferrari distributor for California).

== Racing successes ==
Ferrari race cars sporting Jano-designed V12 engines scored many victories in Europe and internationally. In 1956, the 290 MM won the Mille Miglia, brought 1-2 victory at the Sveriges Grand Prix and placed third at the 1000 km Nürburgring. In 1957, the 290 MM won the 1000 km Buenos Aires. Same year the 315 S scored 1-2 victory at the Mille Miglia and third place at the 1000 km Nürburgring with the highest Le Mans score of fifth place. The 335 S won 1-2 at the Gran Premio de Venezuela and finished second at the Nürburgring and the Swedish Grand Prix. In the short-lived Race of Two Worlds, ran in 1957 and 1958 only, the highest place of any European entrant was achieved by the Ferrari 412 MI. The Jano V12 engines helped Ferrari achieve 1956 and 1957 World Sportscar Championships. In 1956 the 290 MM scored two out of five rounds and in 1957 three different Jano-engined models won three out of seven rounds.

After rules change for 1958 season, imposing a 3.0 L total capacity limit, most of the Jano sports cars became obsolete. In the end Ferrari moved towards ubiquitous Colombo 250 engined sports and GT cars, winning 1958 World Sportscar Championship solely with the 250 Testa Rossas.

== See also ==
- List of Ferrari engines
