= Ferrari 290 S =

1957 sports car

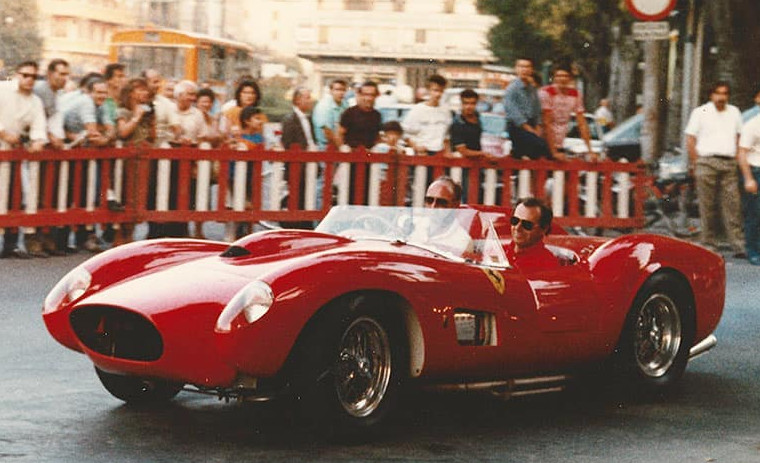
- Ferrari 315 S converted from 290 S

Overview
- Manufacturer: Ferrari
- Also called: Ferrari 290 Sport
- Production: 1957; 2 produced
- Designer: Carrozzeria Scaglietti

Body and chassis
- Body style: Spyder
- Layout: Front mid-engine, rear-wheel-drive

Powertrain
- Engine: 3.5 L (3490.61 cc) Tipo 136 Jano V12
- Power output: 330 PS
- Transmission: 4-speed manual

Dimensions
- Wheelbase: 2,350 mm (92.5 in)

Chronology
- Predecessor: Ferrari 290 MM
- Successor: Ferrari 315 S

The Ferrari 290 S was a sports racing car produced by Ferrari in 1957. It was a development of an earlier 290 MM race car that won the 1956 Mille Miglia. The 290 S was the first sports car manufactured by Ferrari to be powered by a DOHC V12 engine. Its career was very short but it served as an important milestone in the Jano V12-powered lineage.

== Development ==
The Vittorio Jano-designed V12 engine received some technical solutions and experience from the Lancia’s Formula One V8 engine. It was an evolution of the one earlier installed in the 290 MM sports racing car, now with a four overhead camshaft configuration. The new engine was installed in the same, unmodified tubular chassis from its predecessor. The spyder body, coachbuilt by Scaglietti, was updated to incorporate the new technical regulations introduced by the FIA.

Unlike its predecessor, the 290 S did not score any victories. Only two examples were produced (chassis numbers 0646 and 0656), and both were further converted into a larger displacement derivative, the 315 S, one before 12 Hours of Sebring, the second after the race.

== Specifications ==
=== Engine ===
The new Jano V12 engine, codenamed Tipo 136, received a new configuration with twin overhead camshafts per cylinder bank. The internal measurements of 73 by 69.5 mm (2.9 by 2.7 in) of bore and stroke, and the resulting total capacity of 3,490.61 cc (3.5 L; 213.0 cu in) remained the same as before. At a 9:1 compression ratio, the power output was 330 PS (243 kW; 325 hp) at 8000 rpm. For comparison, the 290 MM had a maximum power of 320 PS at 7200 rpm. The fuel feed was also updated, now with six Weber 42DCN carburettors, instead of three 36IR4s. Ignition was by twin spark plugs, served by four coils. The engine used a dry sump lubrication system.

=== Chassis and suspension ===
The tubular steel chassis, known as tipo 520, was the same as on the 290 MM that in turn was derived from the 860 Monza. The front suspension was independent, and the rear was a De Dion type with transverse leaf springs. Hydraulic shock absorbers were installed on both ends. Transmission and braking remained the same as before.

== Racing ==
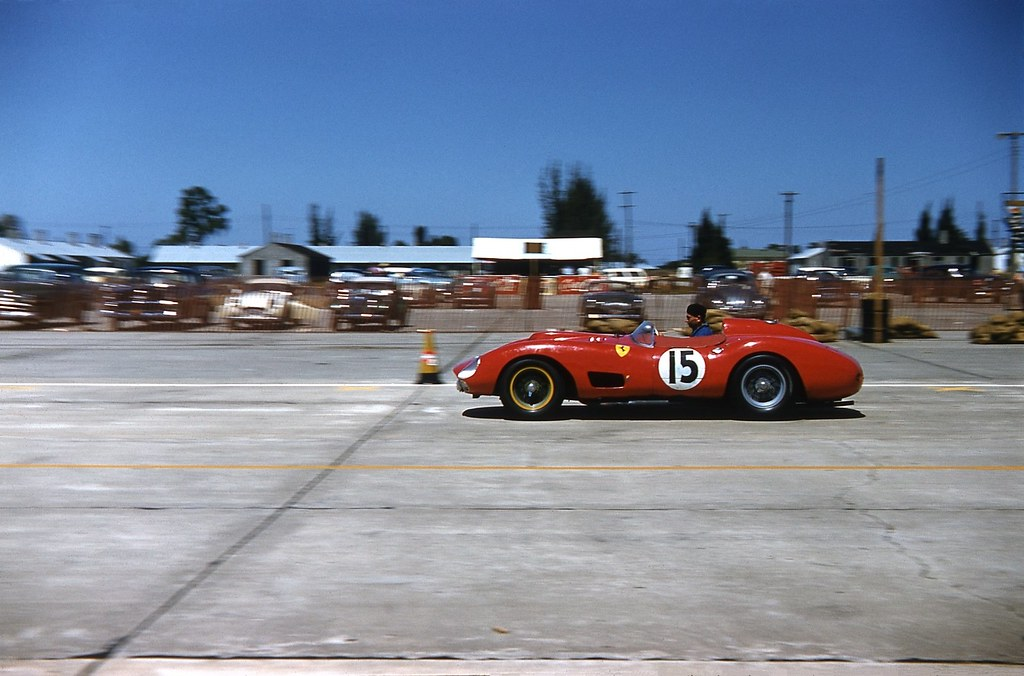
Ferrari 290 S during practice of 1957 12 Hours of Sebring

Both cars debuted at the 1000 km Buenos Aires in 1957. The first car s/n 0646, was driven by Eugenio Castellotti, Luigi Musso and Maurice Trintignant, and managed to qualify at a second place. In the actual race the car has retired around half-way with an ignition problems. Musso has changed the team and supported the winning 290 MM’s crew. The engine was upgraded to 315 S specification for Sebring race by March, and the car was subsequently destroyed at the tragic 1957 Mille Miglia in the final 335 S guise.

The second car s/n 0656 also debuted in the Argentinian race. The 290 S had qualified on a fifth place but also did not finish the race. Issues with an oil pressure had forced Peter Collins and Mike Hawthorn to retire after completing only two laps. The 0656 was then prepared for the 1957 12 Hours of Sebring, but was not upgraded to a bigger capacity. Instead the car received an older, SOHC tipo 130 engine from the 290 MM. Masten Gregory with Lou Brero drove the car, entered by George Tilp, to a fourth overall and a third in class. It was the best Ferrari result in this event as the more powerful 315 S’ came sixth and seventh. The car was later converted into the 3.8-litre 315 S before May 1957.
