= Ferrari 335 S =

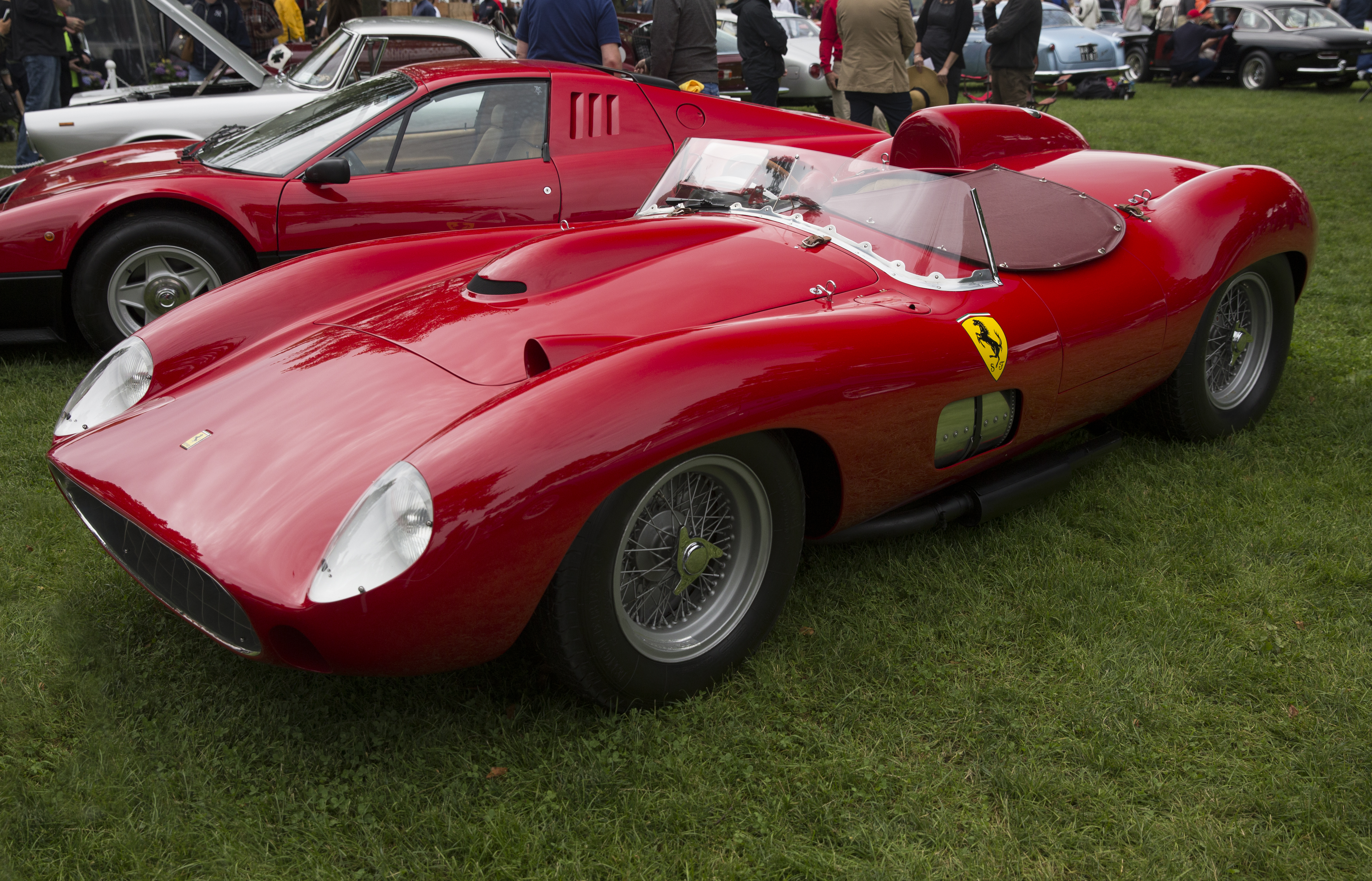

Overview
- Manufacturer: Ferrari
- Also called: Ferrari 335 Sport
- Production: 1957–1958; 4 made (two converted from 315 S chassis)
- Designer: Carrozzeria Scaglietti

Body and chassis
- Class: Race car
- Body style: 2-door Spyder
- Layout: Front mid-engine, rear-wheel-drive
- Related: Ferrari 290 MM

Powertrain
- Engine: 4.0 L (4,023.32 cc) Tipo 141 Jano V12
- Power output: 400 PS (395 hp; 294 kW)
- Transmission: 4-speed manual

Dimensions
- Wheelbase: 2,350 mm (92.5 in)
- Curb weight: 880 kg (1,940 lb) (dry)

Chronology
- Predecessor: Ferrari 315 S
- Successor: Ferrari 250 TR

The Ferrari 335 S was a sports racing car produced by Italian automobile manufacturer Ferrari between 1957 and 1958. The car was a direct response to the Maserati 450S which with its 4.5-litre engine was threatening to overpower the 3.8-litre 315 S and 3.5-litre 290 MM. Four cars were produced in total.

== Development ==
An evolution of the 315 S, it had an evolution of the Jano V12 engine displacing 4,023.32 cc (4.0 L) and a maximum power output of 400 PS (395 hp; 294 kW) at 7,400 rpm; this increase in power allowed the car to attain an estimated top speed of around 300 km/h (186 mph). Due to its exceptional performance at the time, the car was also called "Super Testarossa". Four cars were produced (chassis numbers 0674, 0676, 0700 and 0764. The first two being 315 S later converted to 335 S spec).

== Competition History ==
The 335 S had a bleak competition history as it was the model that crashed at the 1957 Mille Miglia, with 9 dead spectators leading to the cancellation of the event series due to public outrage. Enzo Ferrari was also sued, it took until 1961 to get cleared.

In its 1957 World Sportscar Championship debut in the third round, the 335 S #531 (sn. 0676), driven by Spanish driver Alfonso de Portago (who had replaced an ill Luigi Musso) was in third place close to the finish in Brescia, running on a long straight road sector between the Lombard hamlets of Cerlongo and Guidizzolo when one of the tyres exploded. He lost control of the car; it hit a telephone pole, jumped over a brook, then hit several spectators. The Ferrari then bounced back on the road, hitting more spectators, slid over the road, spinning, and ended up, wheels down, in a brook at the other side of the road. In addition to de Portago, his American navigator Edmund Gunner Nelson and nine spectators – among them five children – lost their lives. A further 20 were injured. De Portago's body was found near the car, severed in half. The car was destroyed in the accident.

The other 335 S (0700) driven by Peter Collins and Louis Klemantaski had broken down whilst in the lead giving victory to a 315 S (#535)(0684) driven by Piero Taruffi.

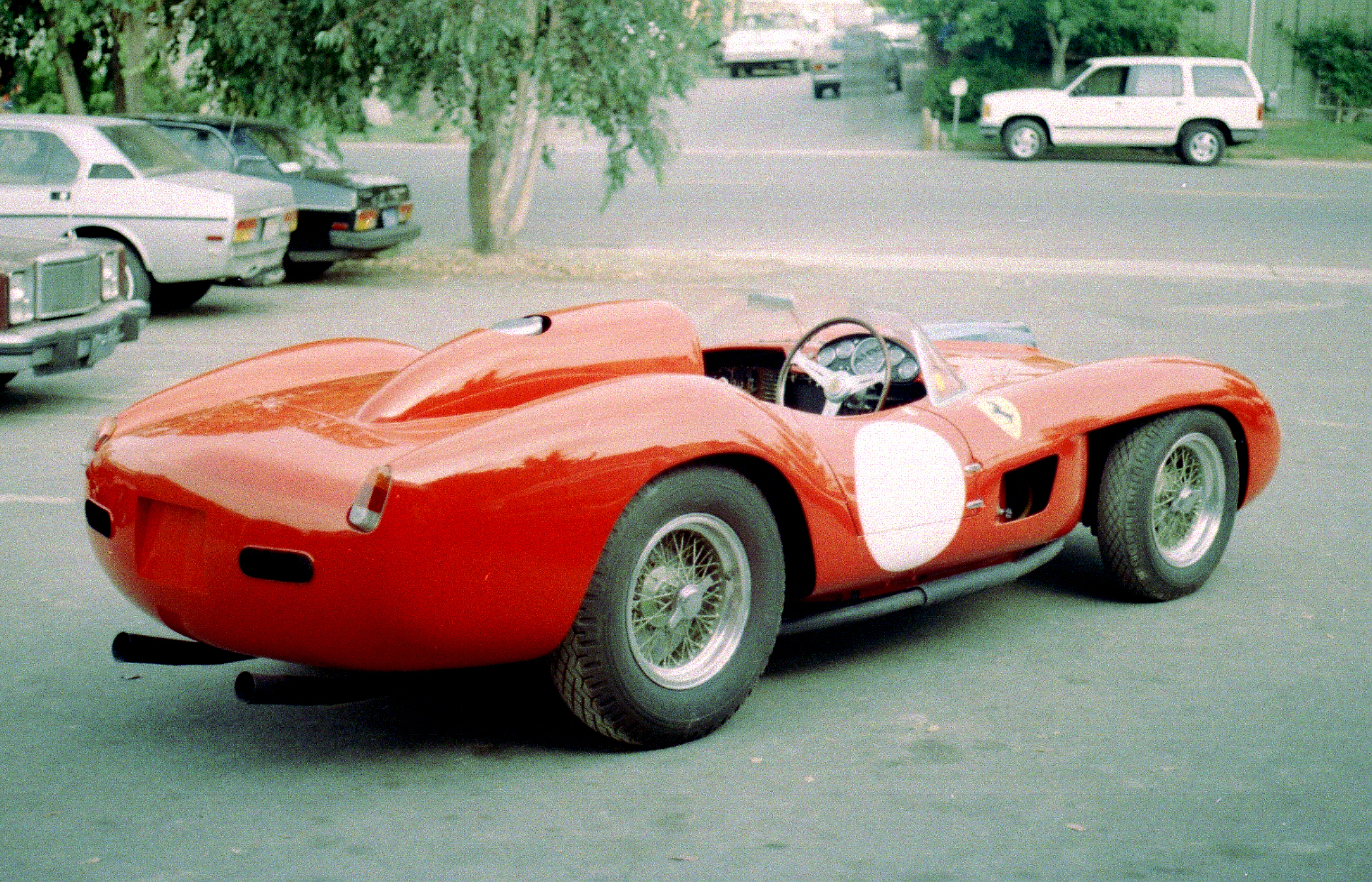
Ferrari 335 S #0764

Due to the crash only a single 335 S (0700) in the hands of Collins and Olivier Gendebien was entered in the next round at the Nürburgring 1000km and came second behind an Aston Martin DBR1 and although both 335 S models failed at Le Mans allowing the Jaguar D Types a 1-2-3-4 finish, Collins and Phil Hill obtained another second place in car 0700 at the Swedish GP behind a Maserati 450S with Mike Hawthorn and Luigi Musso finishing fourth in the sister car (0674). A single 335 S (0700) in the hands of Olivier Gendebien finished third at Spa in the non-championship Grand Prix de RACB behind an Aston Martin DBR1 driven by Tony Brooks and a Ferrari 290 MM piloted by Masten Gregory. In the final round of the World Sports Car Championship at the Venezuelan Grand Prix, a 335 S (0700) raced by Collins and Phil Hill won with Hawthorn and Musso (0674) finishing second. These results, added to the earlier Mille Miglia victory by a 315 S and the win in the Buenos Aires 1000 Km by a 290 MM, gave the World title once again to Ferrari, having won each season since 1953 except 1955 in which Mercedes took part.

The change in regulations for the 1958 World Sportscar Championship to a 3-litre engine limit was a reaction to the Mille Miglia crash, the 1955 Le Mans and Dundrod disasters, and other tragedies. This rendered the 335 S ineligible for the 1958 season and onwards. Ferrari replaced the model with the 250 TR.

== Auction results ==
In 2016, a 1957 Ferrari 335 S Spider Scaglietti sold for €32.1 million (US$35.1 million) at the Retromobile auction in Paris as a result of a bidding war between Cristiano Ronaldo and Lionel Messi making it the most expensive car to be sold at an auction at the time. In the 315 S guise, the car had finished sixth in the 12 Hours of Sebring in 1957 driven by Peter Collins and Maurice Trintignant and later driven by Wolfgang von Trips to a second place finish at the 1957 Mille Miglia. After having its engine upgraded to a 4.0-litre model, it then set the lap record at Le Mans, finished fourth in the Swedish GP and second in the Venezuelan GP. Finally, it won the 1958 Cuban Grand Prix driven by Stirling Moss.
