= Ferrari 315 S =

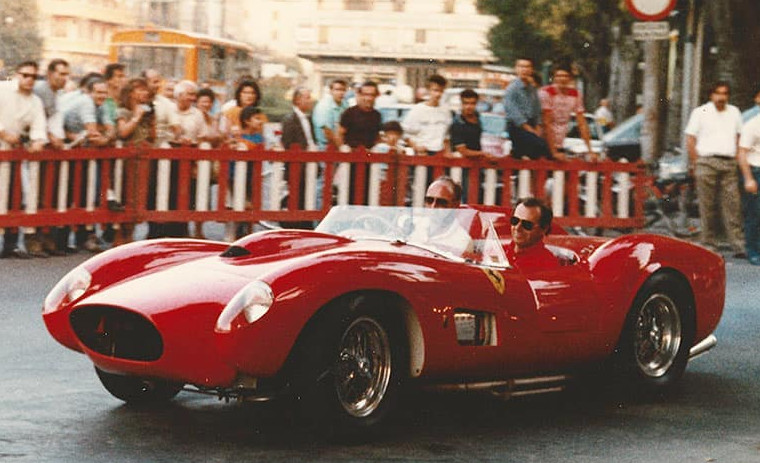
- 1957 Ferrari 290 Sport Scaglietti s/n 0656 in Modena during the 80 Anni di Sport celebrations

Overview
- Manufacturer: Ferrari
- Also called: Ferrari 315 Sport
- Production: 1957; 3 made (one converted from a 290 S)
- Designer: Carrozzeria Scaglietti

Body and chassis
- Class: Sports racing car
- Body style: 2-door Spyder
- Layout: Front mid-engine, rear-wheel-drive

Powertrain
- Engine: 3.8 L (3,783.40 cc) Tipo 140 Jano V12
- Power output: 360 PS (355 hp; 265 kW)
- Transmission: 4-speed manual

Dimensions
- Wheelbase: 2,350 mm (92.5 in)
- Curb weight: 880 kg (1,940 lb) (dry)

Chronology
- Predecessor: Ferrari 290 S
- Successor: Ferrari 335 S

The Ferrari 315 S is a sports racing car produced by Ferrari in 1957. The model served as the replacement of the Ferrari 290 MM, which had won the 1956 Mille Miglia and was an effort to dethrone the ever powerful Maserati 450S.

== Development ==
The 315 S employed a front mounted evolution of the 60° Jano V12 engine with two valves per cylinder, six Weber 42 DCN carburettors and four chain-driven overhead camshafts, for a total displacement of 3,783.40 cc (3.8 L). Maximum power output was rated to 360 PS (265 kW; 355 hp) at 7,800 rpm in addition to an increase in power output, the engine was also 9 kg (20 lb) lighter than its previous iteration. This allowed for an estimated top speed of 290 km/h (180 mph).

== Competition history ==
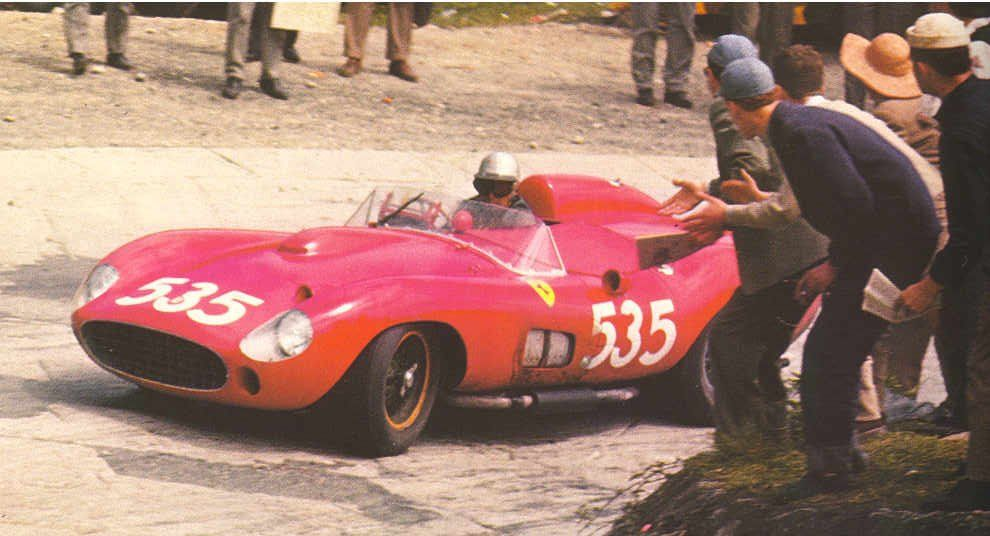
Piero Taruffi during the 1957 Mille Miglia

The Ferrari 315 S drivers took the first two positions at the 1957 Mille Miglia in the hands of Piero Taruffi which ended up being the final race of his career, followed by Wolfgang von Trips. In addition the 315 S finished sixth and seventh at Sebring, third at the Nürburgring and fifth at Le Mans but was then largely replaced by the 335 S. The victory of a Ferrari 335 S in Venezuela and the retirement of the Maseratis granted Ferrari the World Sports Car Championship in 1957.

The change in regulations for the World Sports Car championship to a 3-litre engine limit for 1958 meant the 315 S was replaced by the 250 Testa Rossa.

== Production Numbers ==
Only one unit of the 315 S was built from scratch with two converted from a 290 S and 290 MM. They are as follows: 1. Chassis 0656. Originally a 290 S at Buenos Aires in January 1957, upgraded to 315 S for the May Nürburgring race and later repaired by the factory with pontoon fenders when raced in the US. 2. Chassis 0674. Originally a 1956 290 MM renumbered and re-engined as a 315 S for Sebring 1957. In June 1957 re-engined as a 335 S for Hawthorn/Lusso at Le Mans. Converted to pontoon fender bodywork by the factory for the Venezuela GP in 1957, later converted back to correct Scaglietti 335 S configuration. 3. Chassis 0684. Built new as a 315 S, raced twice as such by the factory and only briefly in period in the US without modification before long-term storage and careful restoration.

== See also ==
- Maserati 450S
