= 1957 1000 km Buenos Aires =

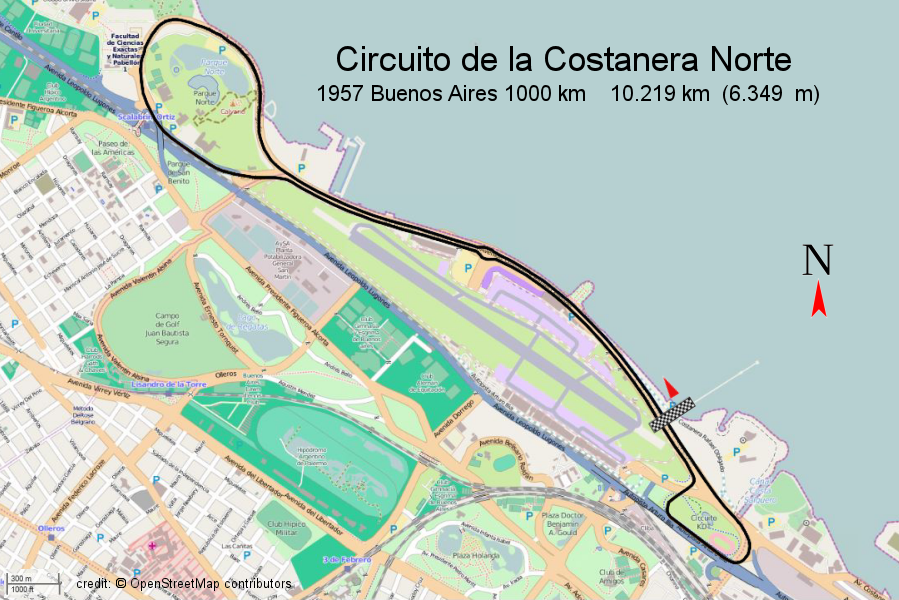
Circuit Costanera Norte Buenos Aires 1000 km (1957)

The 1957 1000 km Buenos Aires took place on 20 January, on the Circuito de la Costanera Norte, (Buenos Aires, Argentina). It was the fourth running of the race, and once again, it was opening round of the F.I.A. World Sports Car Championship. For this event, was moved from its previous venue, the Autódromo Municipal-Avenida Paz, only to return to the Autódromo in 1958.

== Report ==
=== Entry ===
A grand total of 30 racing cars were registered for this event, of which all 30 arrived for practice and 24 for qualifying for the race. Although this was the first major sports car race of the year, as in previous years, the race was poorly supported by the work of teams. Again, only Ferrari and Maserati sent cars from Europe. Both teams were represented by multiple cars in the race. Ferrari send two Ferrari 290 S and a single Ferrari 290 MM, but also loaned works driver to the Americans entered 290 MM of Scuderia Temple Buell during the meeting. Meanwhile, Officine Alfieri Maserati was represented a four different cars, across five entries. The remaining bulk of the field, were cars from South American teams.

Unlike the previous 1000 km Buenos Aires races, the Automóvil Club Argentino decided the race should take place at a different venue, instead of the Autódromo Municipal-Avenida Paz. They choose the Circuito de la Costanera Norte, which used the wide service roads of the Aeroparque Jorge Newbery. The reason for the change was that need to move to a “safer” track.

=== Qualifying ===
After a three-hour qualifying session held on the prior to the race, the local hero, Juan Manuel Fangio took pole position for Officine Alfieri Maserati, in their Maserati 450S.

=== Race ===
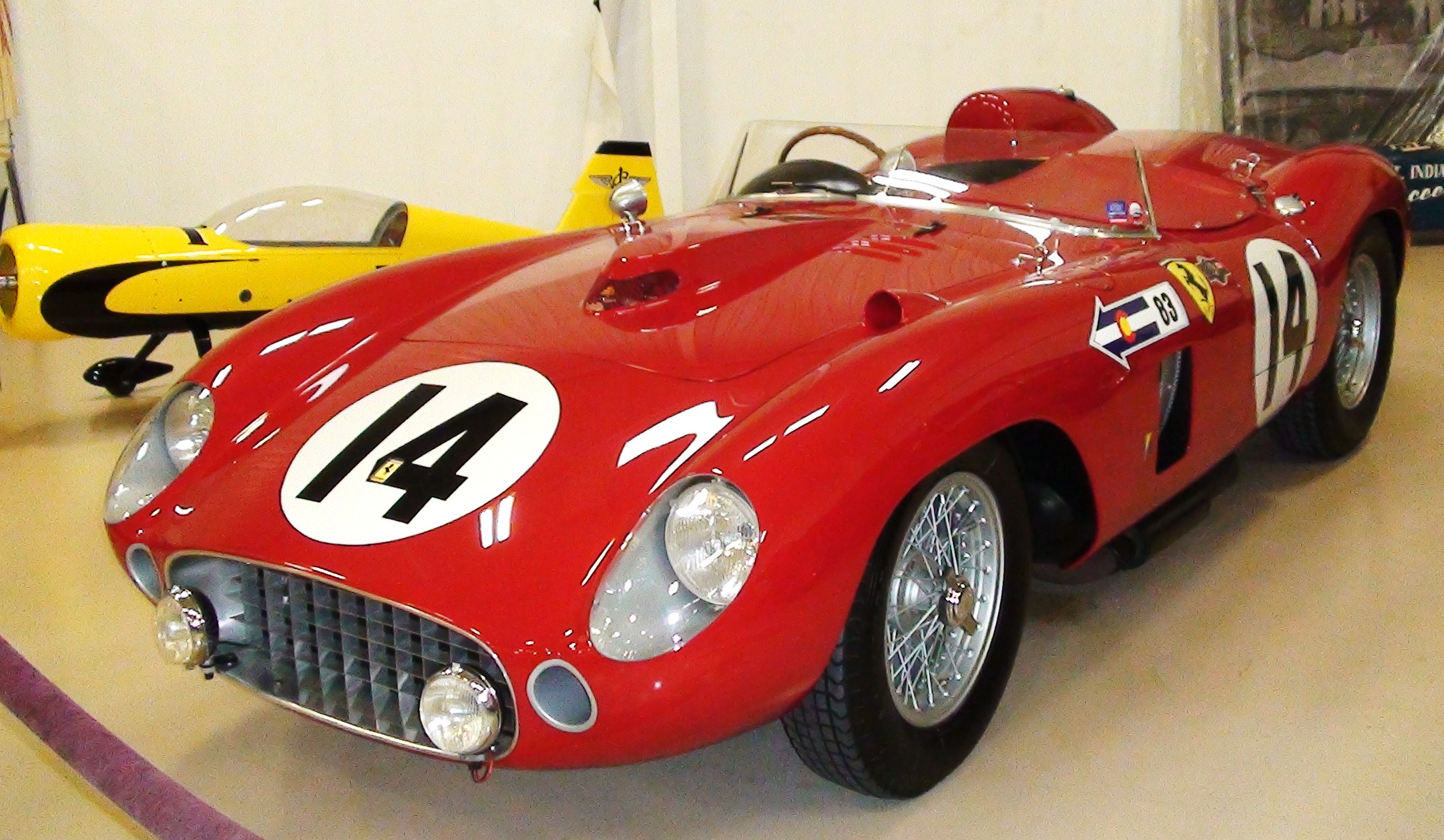
Ferrari 290 MM Spider Scaglietti - similar to the car driven to victory by Gregory/Castellotti/Musso

The race was held over 98 laps of the 6.350 mile, Circuito de la Costanera Norte, giving a distance of 622.281 miles (1,001.462 km). in front of an estimated crowd of 100,000, it was the winner of the 1956 race, Stirling Moss, Fangio’s team-mate, who took an early lead from the entire fleet of Ferraris, piloted by Eugenio Castellotti, Peter Collins, Alfonso de Portago and Masten Gregory in the Temple Buell Ferrari. Jean Behra appears next in sixth. At the end of lap one, Castellotti pits with differential problems and loses more than seven minutes, and hands the car over to Luigi Musso. During the second lap, the Maserati 300S of Oscar Cabalén skidded off the track and into the crowd, causing numerous injuries.

At the end of the third lap, Collins retired his Ferrari 290 S with dangerously low oil pressure, meanwhile, Moss was marching way at the head of field, now being followed by Gregory, de Portago and Behra. Lap after lap, Moss continued to pull away from the field. On lap 24, he set the fastest lap of the race, before handing the car over to Fangio, who drove at the same feverish pace, increasing their advantage and wreaking havoc among his followers. Lap 56, was the Ferrari of Musso abandon the race with an ignition fault, meanwhile a lap later, Fangio heads into the pits with insurmountable problems with the differential.

Brought about by the numerous retirements and changes in the composition of the works Italian teams, as a result of the withdrawal of the Moss/Fangio Maserati, the Temple Buell Ferrari lead the Ferrari of de Portago/Collins and the Maserati of Behra/Carlos Menditéguy. This Maserati pairing are joined by Moss. Taking all conceivable risks, Moss is able to relive the second Ferrari, now being driven by Castellotti, of second place on lap 88. At every turn, Moss reduces the lead, but the partnership of Gregory/Castellotti/Musso hold to take the spoils, winning in a time of 6hrs 10:29.9 mins., averaging a speed of 100.775 mph. In second was the sole remaining Officine Alfieri Maserati of Behra/ Menditéguy/Moss, albeit 83.5 seconds drift. The podium was complete by the Scuderia Ferrari, of de Portago/Collins/Castellotti, who were a 66.2 seconds back.

As a result of Fangio’s retirement, Moss and Menditéguy in car number 31, took an impressive victory,

== Official Classification ==
Class Winners are in Bold text.

Pos	No	Class	Driver		Entrant	Chassis	Laps	Reason Out
1st	**10**	**S+3.0**	(United States) **Masten Gregory** (Italy) **Luigi Musso**	(Italy) **Eugenio Castellotti**	**Scuderia Temple Buell**	**Ferrari 290 MM Spider Scaglietti**	**6hr 10:29.9, 98**	
2nd	**28**	**S3.0**	(France) **Jean Behra** (United Kingdom) **Stirling Moss**	(Argentina) **Carlos Menditéguy**	**Officine Alfieri Maserati**	**Maserati 300S**	**6hr 11:53.4, 98**	
3rd	8	S+3.0	(Spain) Alfonso de Portago (Italy) Eugenio Castellotti	(United Kingdom) Peter Collins	Scuderia Ferrari	Ferrari 290 MM	6hr 12:59.6, 98	
4th	14	S+3.0	(Argentina) Roberto Mieres	(United Kingdom) Ninian Sanderson	Ecurie Ecosse	Jaguar D-Type	95	
DNF	38	S3.0	(Brazil) Celso Lara-Barberis	(Brazil) Eugenio Martins	Scuderia Madunina Brasil	Ferrari 750 Monza	91	Engine
5th	16	S+3.0	(Argentina) Roberto Bonomi	(Italy) Luigi Piotti	Officine Alfieri Maserati	Maserati 350S	91	
DNF	56	S2.0	(Brazil) Severino Silva	(Brazil) Pinheiro Piris	Scuderia Madunina Brasil	Maserati A6GCS	90	Accident
6th	**62**	**S1.5**	(Argentina) **Alejandro de Tomaso**	(United States) **Isabel Haskell**	**Automobili O.S.C.A.**	**Osca S1500**	**88**	
7th	**52**	**S2.0**	(Italy) **Piero Drogo**	(Venezuela) **Julio Pola**	**Madunina Venezuela**	**Ferrari 500 TR**	**87**	
8th	68	S1.5	(Guatemala) Jaroslav Juhan	(Argentina) Antonio von Döry	Jaroslav Juhan	Porsche 550 RS Carrera	86	
9th	36	S3.0	(Brazil) Herminio Ferreira Filho	(Brazil) Godofredo Vianna	São Paulo Automovil Club	Ferrari 750 Monza	85	
10th	50	S3.0	(Brazil) Carlos Danvila	(Uruguay) Omar Terra	Orlando Terra	Mercedes-Benz 300 SL	78	
11th	48	S3.0	(Argentina) Nestor Salerno	(Argentina) César Reyes	Nestor Salerno	Ferrari 212 Inter	74	
12th	70	S1.5	(West Germany) Curt Delfosse	(Argentina) Ernesto Tornquist	Curt Delfosse	Porsche 550 RS Carrera	71	
DNF	64	S1.5	(Venezuela) Sergio Vivaldi	(Venezuela) Lino Fayen	Venezuela Sports Group	Osca TN 1500	71	Engine
DNF	2	S+3.0	(United Kingdom) Stirling Moss	(Argentina) Juan Manuel Fangio	Officine Alfieri Maserati	Maserati 450S	57	Gearbox
DNF	4	S+3.0	(Italy) Eugenio Castellotti	(West Germany) Wolfgang von Trips	Scuderia Ferrari	Ferrari 290 S	55	ignition
DNF	18	S3.0	(Argentina) Luis Milán	(Argentina) Jorge Camaño	Argentina Racing	Ferrari 375 Plus	51	Gearbox
DNF	66	S1.5	(Brazil) Christian Heins	(Brazil) Cyro Cayres	Scuderia Madunina Brasil	Porsche 550 RS	45	Gearbox
DNF	30	S3.0	(United States) Harry Schell	(Sweden) Jo Bonnier	Officine Alfieri Maserati	Maserati 300S	25	Clutch
DNF	58	S2.0	(Argentina) Enrique Arrieta	(Argentina) Carlos Guimarey	Argentina Racing	Osca 2000S	14	Engine
DNF	6	S+3.0	(United Kingdom) Peter Collins	(United Kingdom) Mike Hawthorn	Scuderia Ferrari	Ferrari 290 S	2	Oil pressure
DNF	54	S2.0	(Argentina) Oscar Camaño	(Argentina) Miguel Jantus	Argentina Racing	Maserati A6G	1	Accident
DNF	34	S3.0	(Argentina) Oscar Cabalén	(Argentina) Carlo Tomasi	Scuderia Madunina Brasil	Maserati 300S	1	Accident
DNS	32	S3.0	(Italy) Giorgio Scarlatti	(Argentina) Juan Manuel Fangio	Officine Alfieri Maserati	Maserati 250S		Withdrawn
DNS	20	S+3.0	(Argentina) Carlos Najurieta	(Argentina) César Rivero	Argentina Racing	Ferrari 375 MM		Accident
DNS	12	S+3.0	(United Kingdom) Ron Flockhart	(Argentina) Roberto Mieres	Ecurie Ecosse	Jaguar D-Type		Accident
DNS	22	S+3.0	(Argentina) Clemar Bucci	(Argentina) Oscar de Petris	Argentina Racing	Ferrari 375 MM		Accident
DNS	40	S3.0	(Argentina) Alvaro Piano	(Argentina) Franco Bruno		Ferrari 625 TF		
DNS	26	S+3.0	(Argentina) Carlos Bruno	(Argentina) Angel Pinotti	Argentina Racing	Allard-Cadillac J2		

- Fastest Lap: Stirling Moss, 3:47.6secs (105.830 mph)

=== Class Winners ===
Class	Winners		
Sports +3000	10	Ferrari 290 MM Spider Scaglietti	Gregory / Castellotti / Musso
Sports 3000	28	Maserati 300S	Behra / Menditéguy / Moss
Sports 2000	52	Ferrari 500 TR	Drogo / Pola
Sports 1500	62	Osca S1500	de Tomaso / Haskell

== Standings after the race ==
Pos	Championship	Points
1	(Italy) Ferrari	8
2	(Italy) Maserati	6
3	(United Kingdom) Jaguar	3
4	(Italy) Osca	1

- Note: Only the top five positions are included in this set of standings.

Championship points were awarded for the first six places in each race in the order of 8-6-4-3-2-1. Manufacturers were only awarded points for their highest finishing car with no points awarded for positions filled by additional cars. Only the best 4 results out of the 7 races could be retained by each manufacturer. Points earned but not counted towards the championship totals are listed within brackets in the above table.

World Sportscar Championship
Previous race: 1956 Swedish Grand Prix	1957 season	Next race: 12 Hours of Sebring
