= 1957 World Sportscar Championship =

Racing tournament

Seasons
- ← 1956 1958 →

The 1957 World Sportscar Championship season was the fifth season of the FIA World Sportscar Championship. It was a series for sportscars that ran in many worldwide endurance events. It ran from 20 January 1957 to 3 November 1957, and comprised seven races.

Following the shortest season in World Sportscar Championship history, the 1957 season saw the return of the 24 Hours of Le Mans following track modifications as a direct result of the 1955 Le Mans disaster. In addition, the Venezuelan Grand Prix was added to the championship calendar.

== Season ==
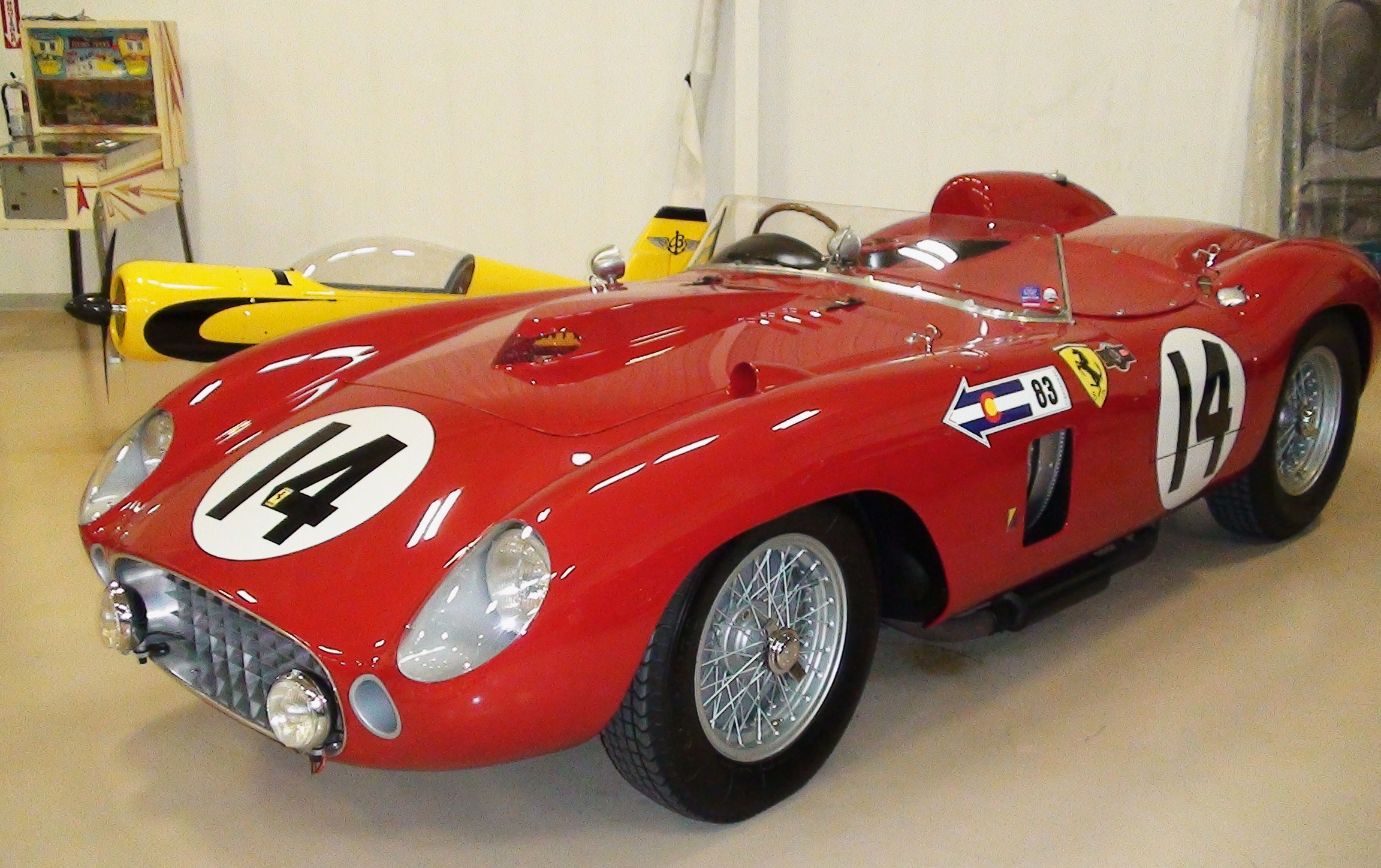
Ferrari won the championship with its 290 MM (pictured), 315 S and 335 S models

The 1957 World Sports Car Championship was contested over seven races. Following the shortest season in World Sportscar Championship history, the 1957 season saw the return of the 24 Hours of Le Mans following track modifications as a direct result of the 1955 Le Mans disaster. In addition, there was a new race on the calendar, a trip to the northern coast of South America for the Venezuelan Grand Prix.

The Championship was remained for manufacturers, and works teams such as Scuderia Ferrari, Officine Alfieri Maserati, and Aston Martin leading the way, but as the previous seasons, the majority of the fields were made up of amateur or gentlemen drivers, often up against professional racing drivers with experience in Formula One. Sometimes, even the Drivers World Champion joined in.

Maserati had the commitment and the money to success in 1957, and it armed itself with the World’s finest driver, Juan Manuel Fangio, and the potent Maserati 450S. To add to their unfair advantage, they employed a young Englishman, Stirling Moss. Despite leaving their Formula One team, he remained with the Modena team for the World Sportscar Championship.

The season opened in Argentina, where Fangio and Moss led imperiously in the 1000 km Buenos Aires, until they retired with transmission failure. As for Ferrari, it was left to the privateer entry of Temple Buell to take the victory, and give Maranello the initial points lead in the championship. Next up was the Sebring 12 Hours. There Maserati dominated with Fangio and Jean Behra leading throughout, with Moss and Harry Schell backing them up. As for Ferrari, they sent the first two 315 S to Florida, but both were slowed with brake and tyre problems.

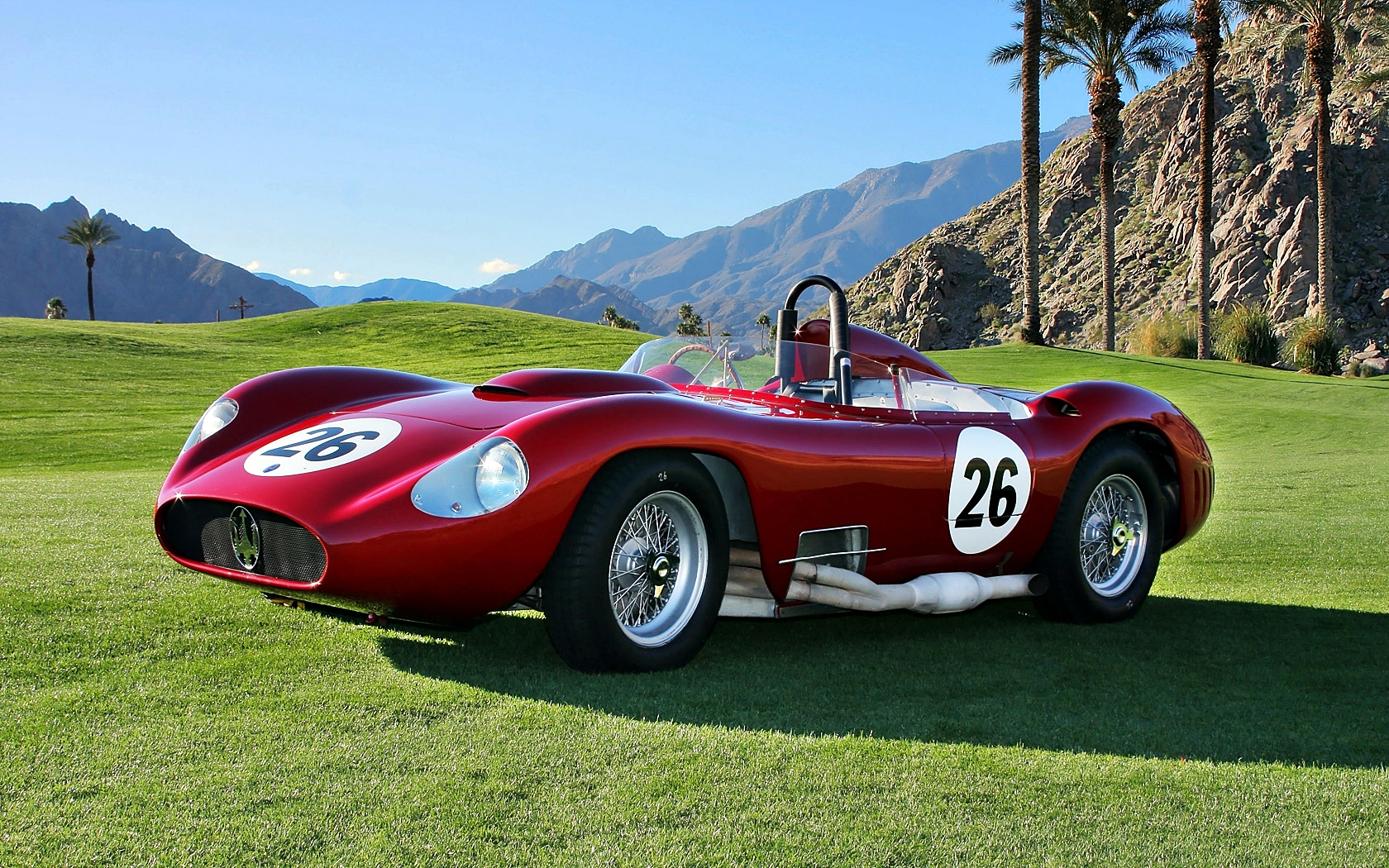
Maserati placed second with its 450S (pictured) and 300S models

For the Mille Miglia, Maserati’s challenge was over before it had really begun, with Behra smashing his car prior to the event in a road accident, and Moss retiring with brake failure just 12 km from the start. With Maserati out of contention, Ferrari had no more real opposition and Piero Taruffi won the last Mille Miglia, ahead of Wolfgang von Trips, both in 315 S. The initial pace was set by Peter Collins in a Ferrari 335 S. He imposed a remarkable pace on the marathon and on course to smash the course record, when a broken transmission put an end to his race. The second 335 S, driven by Alfonso de Portago and Edmont Nelson, was always up among the leaders, but about 10 km from the finish, a tyre blowout caused the car to charge off the road and into a group of spectators, killing nine onlookers and the crew.

The race at the Nürburgring was won by the British. The race victory did not go to either of the major Italian marques, as they were beaten by the Aston Martin DBR1/300 of Tony Brooks and Noël Cunningham-Reid, gaining the manufacturer their first points of the season. The British success continued in the next round at Le Mans, when Grand Prix of Endurance returned to the championship. Never before in the history of the French event, did a single nation sweep the board as the British did in 1957. The Jaguars claimed fourth and sixth place, with victory going to the Scottish entrant, Ecurie Ecosse.

Normal service resumed in Sweden, when Ferrari and Maserati returned to the front of the field. As the Swedish race regulations allowed limitless driver changes, Maserati planned to use only its three best drivers – Schell, Moss and Behra, with the later pair winning the race while the former pair retired in second place when it transmission seized.

The outcome of the championship depended on the result of the finale, the Venezuelan Grand Prix in Caracas. The works Maseratis were supported by the American entrant Temple Buell. The race became an infamous disaster for Maserati, when on lap two Masten Gregory flipped Buell’s 450S. Moss led until he collided with a slow back marker who strolled across his racing line, demolishing his 450S. Its sister 450S ignited during a pit stop, injuring Behra, but Moss and Schell continued to race the car, until Schell was hit by team-mate Joakim Bonnier and his 300S, following a loss of a wheel. So four front-line Maseratis started the deciding Championship race, and all four had crashed - leaving the world title to Ferrari. For the record, Ferrari still took a 1-2 finish.

Because four of their expensive cars were destroyed, their finances were pushed over the edge. At the very moment when Fangio was giving Officine Alfieri Maserati its first world championship in Formula One, the firm was going into survival mode. It was feared that it was never going to recover its position in the world of racing, and would spend decades trying to establish itself as a manufacturer of road cars.

== Season results ==
=== Results ===
Round	Date	Event	Circuit or Location	Winning driver	Winning team	Winning car	Results
1	January 20	(Argentina) 1000km of Buenos Aires	Circuito de la Costanera Norte	(United States) Masten Gregory (Italy) Eugenio Castellotti (Italy) Luigi Musso	(United States) Scuderia Temple Buell	(Italy) Ferrari 290 MM	Results
2	March 23	(United States) 12-Hour Florida International Grand Prix of Endurance for The Amoco Trophy	Sebring International Raceway	(Argentina) Juan Manuel Fangio (France) Jean Behra	(Italy) Maserati Factory	(Italy) Maserati 450S	Results
3	May 12	(Italy) Mille Miglia	Brescia-Rome-Brescia	(Italy) Piero Taruffi	(Italy) Scuderia Ferrari	(Italy) Ferrari 315 S	Results
4	May 26	(West Germany) Internationales ADAC 1000 Kilometre Rennen auf dem Nürburgring	Nürburgring	(United Kingdom) Tony Brooks (United Kingdom) Noël Cunningham-Reid	(United Kingdom) David Brown	(United Kingdom) Aston Martin DBR1/300	Results
5	June 22–23	(France) Les 24 Heures du Mans	Circuit de la Sarthe	(United Kingdom) Ron Flockhart (United Kingdom) Ivor Bueb	(United Kingdom) Ecurie Ecosse	(United Kingdom) Jaguar D-Type	Results
6	August 8	(Sweden) Sveriges Grand Prix	Råbelövsbanan	(France) Jean Behra (United Kingdom) Stirling Moss	(Italy) Officine Alfieri Maserati	(Italy) Maserati 450S	Results
7	November 11	Gran Premio de Venezuela	Caracas	(United Kingdom) Peter Collins (United States) Phil Hill	(Italy) Scuderia Ferrari	(Italy) Ferrari 335 S	Results

Note the RAC Tourist Trophy was given championship status but as in 1956 did not take place due to concerns about the safety of the Dundrod Circuit.

=== Championship ===
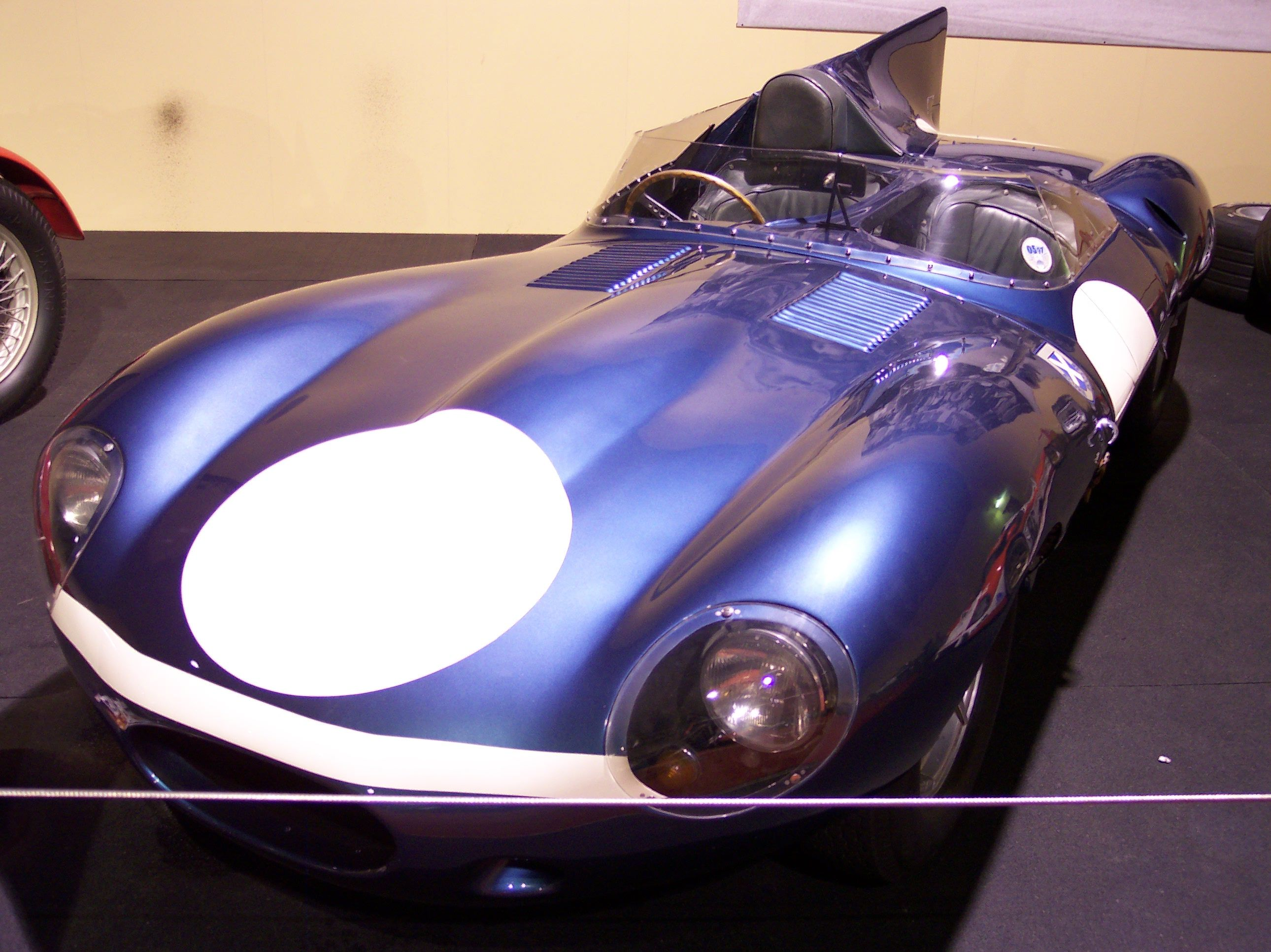
Jaguar placed third with the D-Type

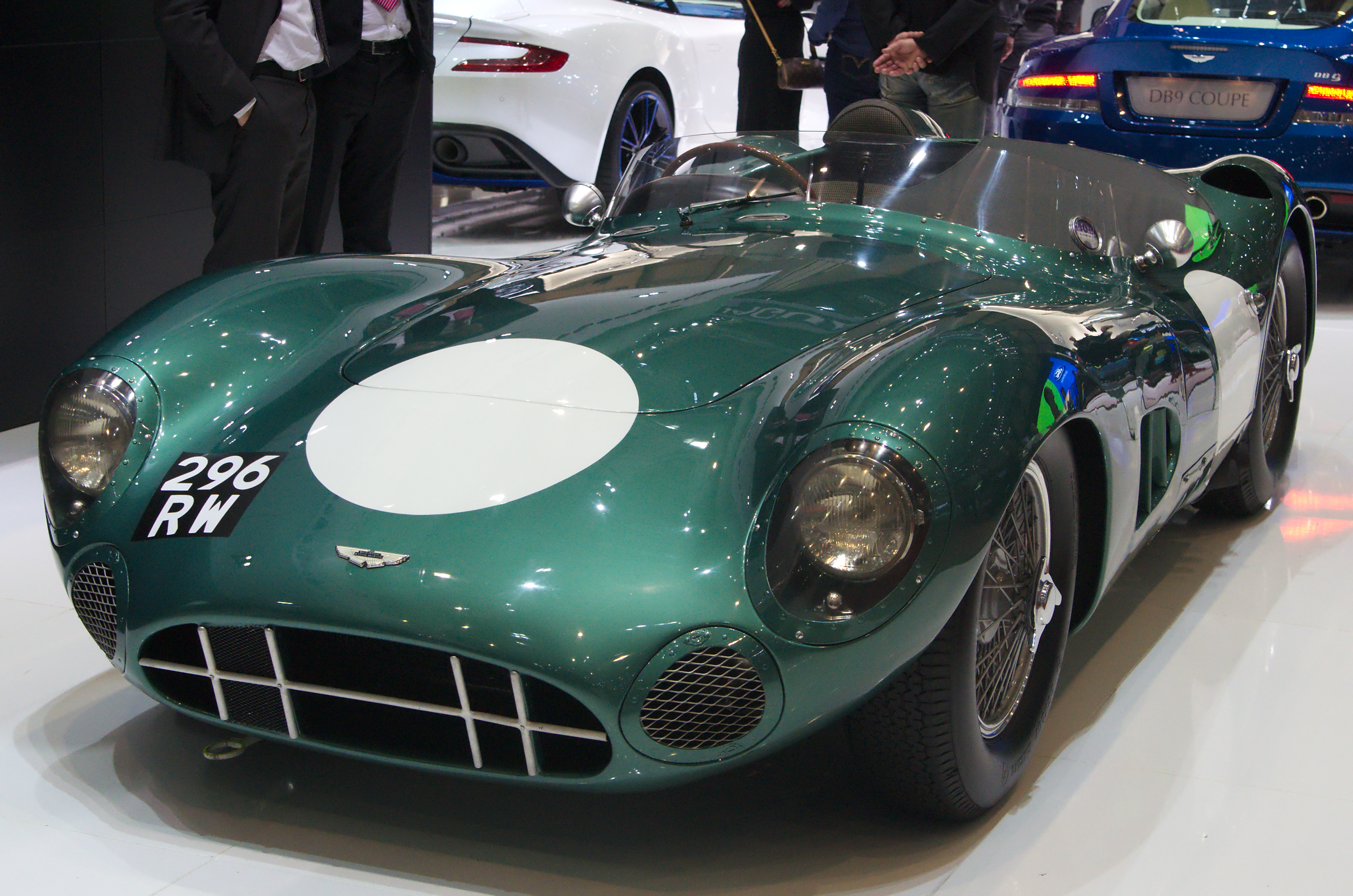
Aston Martin placed fourth with the DBR1

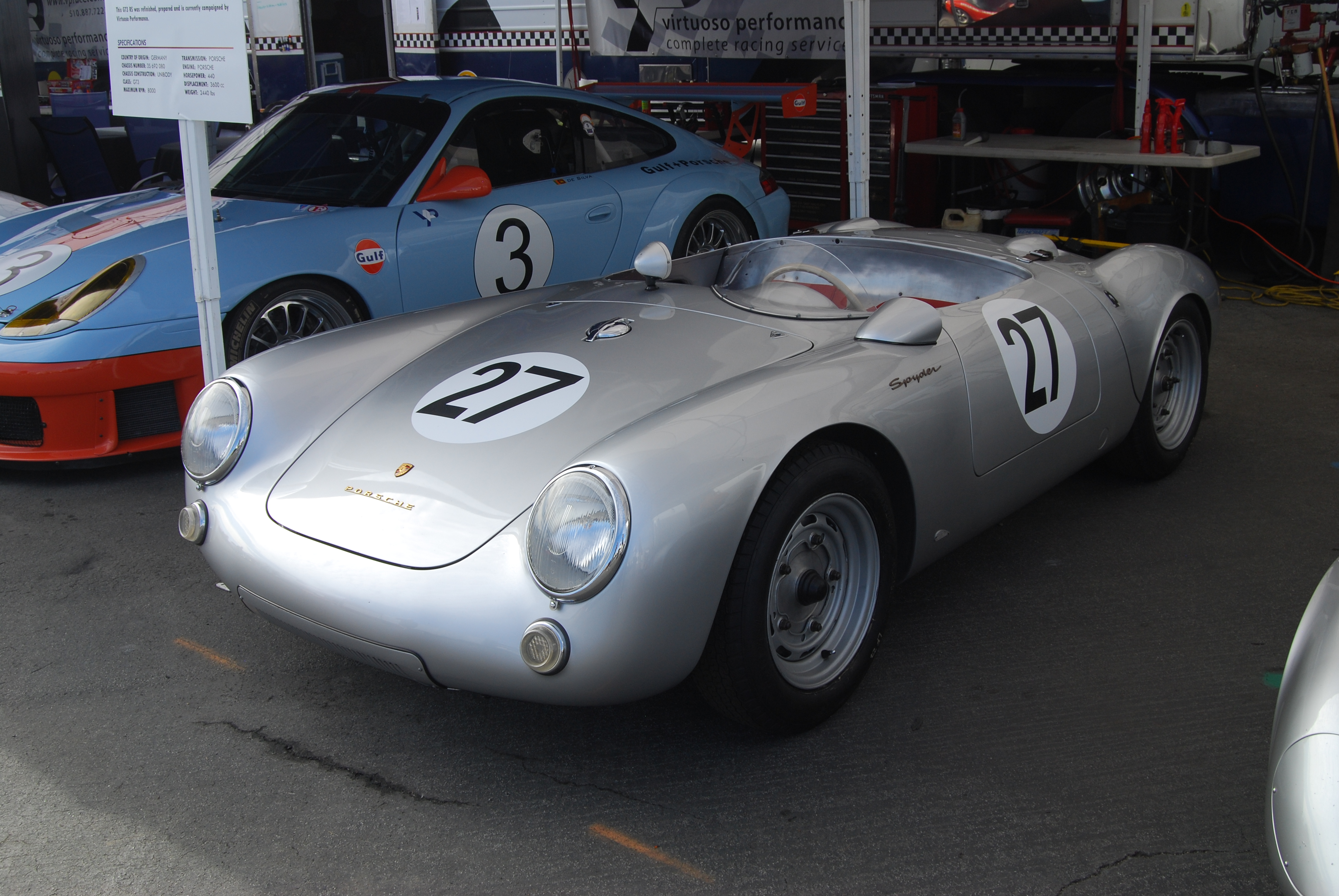
Porsche placed fifth with its 550 RS (pictured) and 718 RSK models

Note:
- Championship points were awarded for the first six places in each race in the order of 8-6-4-3-2-1.
- Manufacturers were awarded points only for their highest finishing car with no points awarded for positions filled by additional cars.
- Only the best 4 results out of the 7 races could be retained by each manufacturer. Points earned but not counted towards the championship totals are listed within brackets in the above table.

Pos.	Manufacturer	(Argentina) BUE	(United States) SEB	(Italy) MMI	(West Germany) NÜR	(France) LMS	(Sweden) SWE	(Venezuela) VEN	Total
1	(Italy) Ferrari	8	(3)	8	6	(2)	(6)	8	30 (41)
2	(Italy) Maserati	6	8	3	(2)		8	(1)	25 (28)
3	(United Kingdom) Jaguar	3	4			8	2		17
4	(United Kingdom) Aston Martin				8				8
5	(West Germany) Porsche			2	3			2	7
6	(Italy) O.S.C.A.	1							1

== The cars ==
The following models contributed to the net championship point scores of their respective manufacturers.

- Ferrari 290 MM, Ferrari 315 S and Ferrari 335 S
- Maserati 300S and Maserati 450S
- Jaguar D-Type
- Aston Martin DBR1/300
- Porsche 550 RS, Porsche 718 RSK & Porsche 550A RS
- Osca S 1500
