= Carrozzeria Scaglietti =

Italian automobile design and coachbuilding company

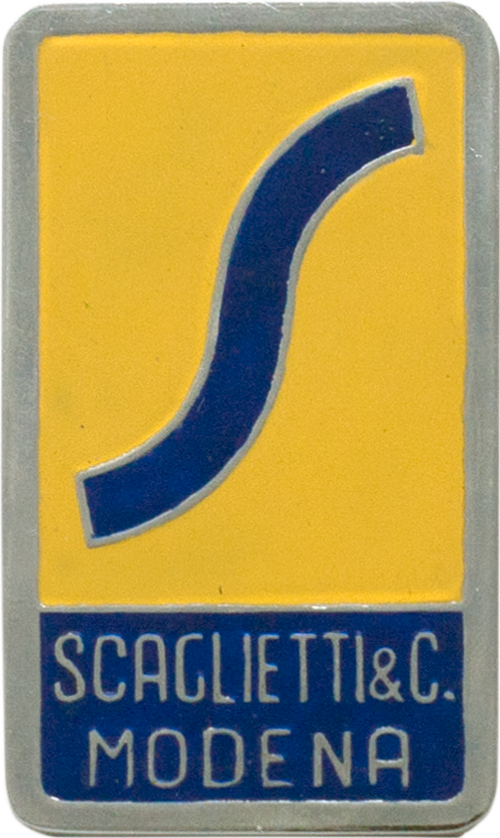
Mid 1950s-era Carrozzeria Scaglietti cloisonné badge, as fitted to Ferrari 500 Mondial and other Scaglietti-bodied cars

Carrozzeria Scaglietti (Italian pronunciation: [karrottseˈriːa skaʎˈʎetti]) was an Italian automobile design and coachbuilding company active in the 1950s. It was founded by Sergio Scaglietti in 1951 as an automobile repair concern, but was located across the road from the original Ferrari workshops Ferrari in Viale Trento Trieste Modena, Italy.

Scaglietti gained Enzo Ferrari's trust and respect both through his bodywork and design skills and for providing a retreat for young Dino Ferrari. Their professional relationship began when Ferrari asked Scaglietti to repair and modify race car bodywork in the late 1940s, which was soon followed by orders for full car bodies in the early 1950s. Scaglietti and Dino Ferrari designed a 166 MM, s/n 0050M, the first Ferrari to have a "headrest" bump. This feature was subsequently used on most racing Ferraris of the 1950s and 1960s. The idea was initially despised by Enzo but championed by Dino, and 0050M's design became an overall success. The car became a prototype for the Monza range.

In the mid-1950s, Scaglietti became the Carrozzeria of choice for Ferrari's racing efforts. Many sports racing prototypes were designed and manufactured at their facility. All those exclusively designed by Scaglietti carried the Scaglietti & C. badge while cars built to outside designs did not. The company's 1958 250 Testa Rossa, with its Formula One-inspired pontoon fenders, is one of the most famous Scaglietti designs. Several of Ferrari's most coveted models such as the 250 California Spyder, 250 GTO and 250 Tour de France were built by Scaglietti to a Pinin Farina design.

Today, the former Scaglietti works is owned by Ferrari and used to produce Ferrari's current line of aluminium bodied cars, including the 488 and F12, using both modern and traditional techniques. In 2002, a special edition of the 456, the 456M GT Scaglietti, was named in honor of Scaglietti. This was followed by the 2004 introduction of the 612 Scaglietti, a 2+2 GT car produced until 2010. Despite names honoring Scaglietti, both the 456 and 612 were designed by Pininfarina.

Sergio Scaglietti died at his Modena home on 20 November 2011 at the age of 91.

== Designs ==
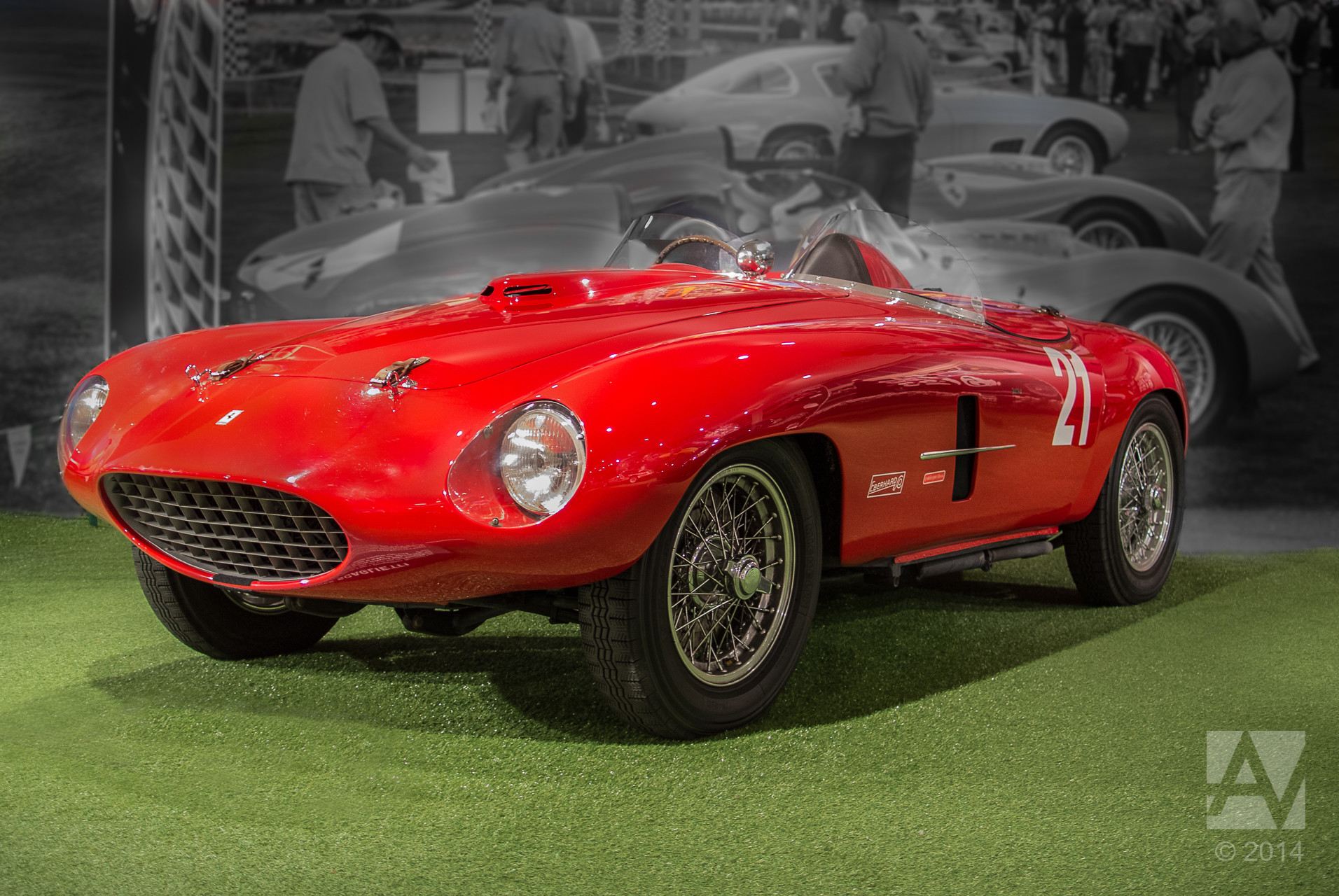
Ferrari 166 MM Scaglietti, rebodied in 1953

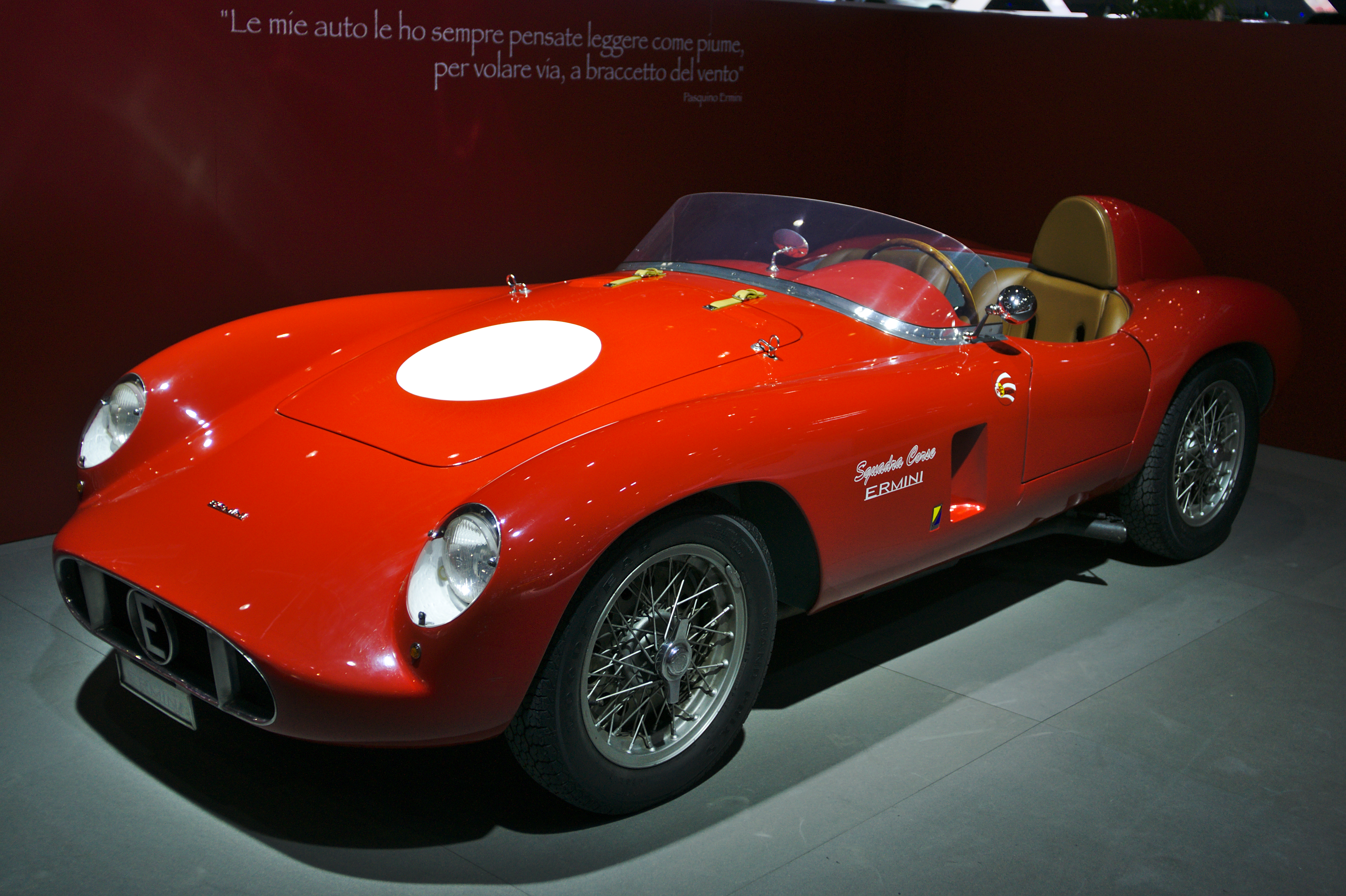
1954 Ermini 357 Sport

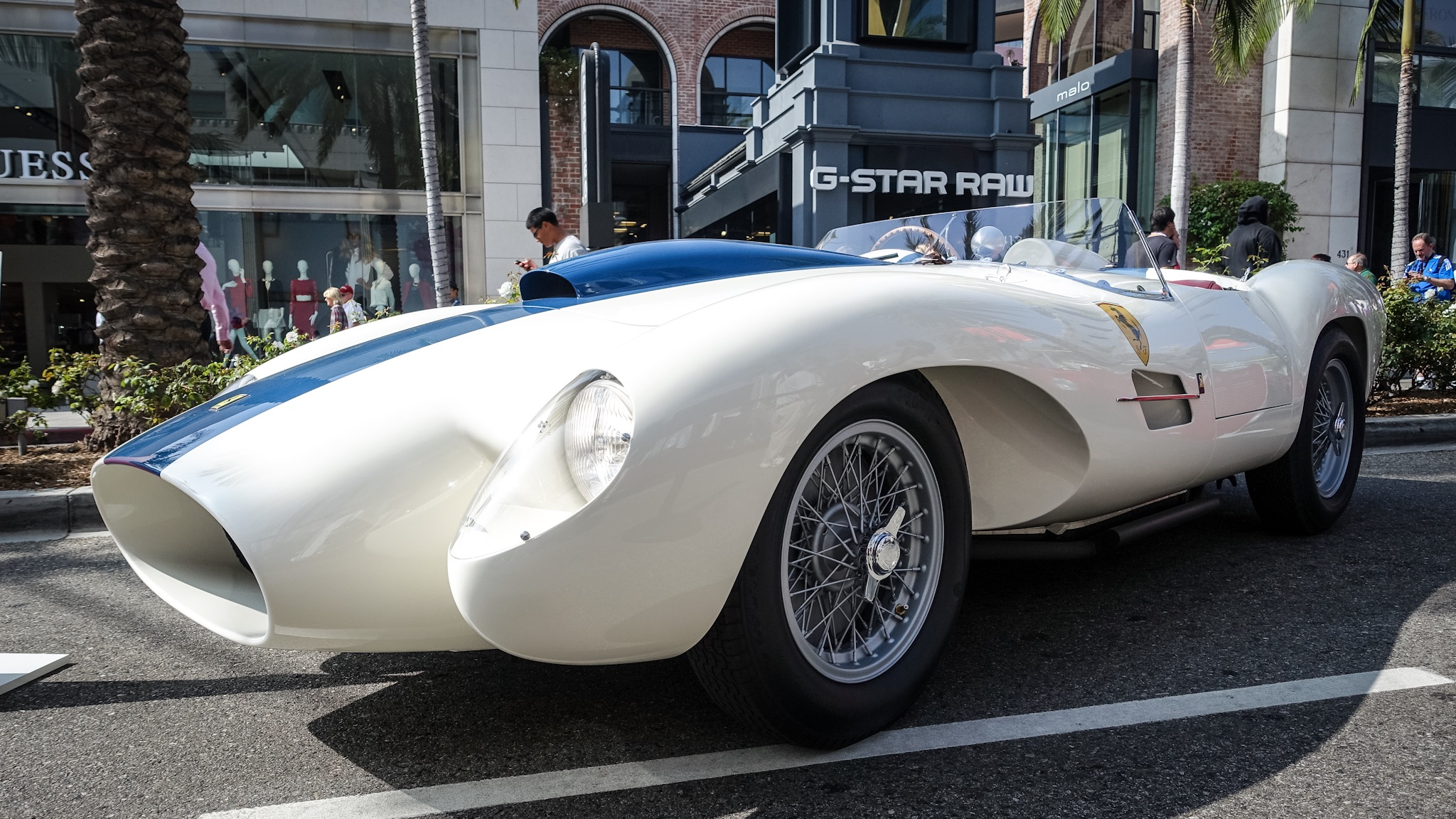
1957-bodied Ferrari 250 Monza

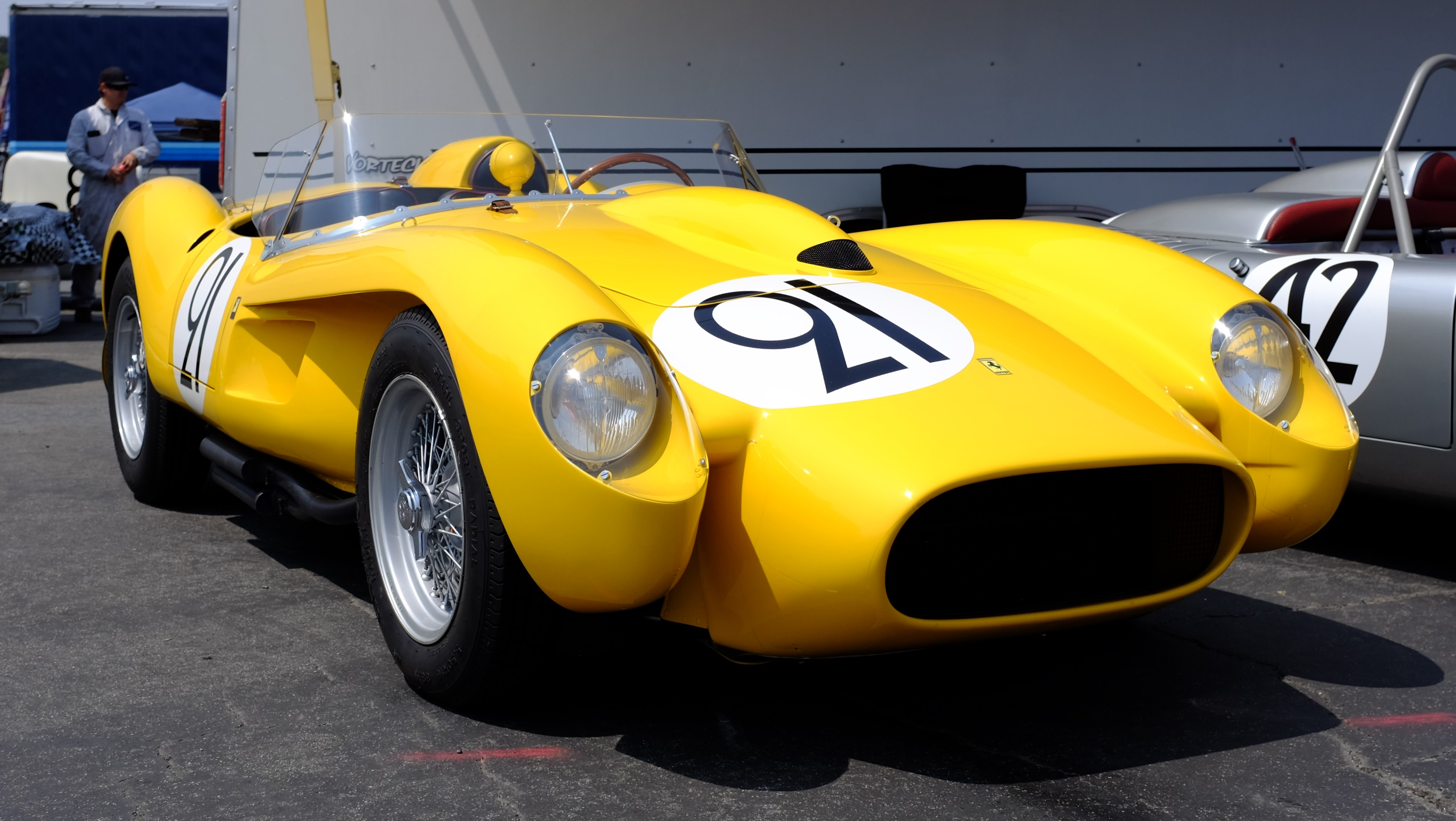
1958 Ferrari 250 TR

Original Scaglietti designs include:

- 1950-built Ferrari 340 America Barchetta (converted from 275 S and rebodied after 1952)
- 1953 Ferrari 166 MM/53 (rebodied as Scaglietti Spyder to an Alfredo Ferrari design and restamped as s/n 0050M)
- 1953 Ferrari 735 S, rebodied by Scaglietti from "Autodromo" design.
- 1953 Ferrari 166 MM/53, s/n 0262M, rebodied from an Abarth spider design in 1954.
- 1953 Ferrari 500 Mondial, rebodied from a burnt 625 TF berlinetta before 12 Hours of Casablanca in December 1953.
- 1954 Ferrari 750 Monza
- 1954 Ferrari 250 Monza (one original and one further rebodied in 1957 in 'pontoon fender' spyder form)
- 1954–5 Ermini 357 Sport
- 1955 Ferrari 410 S (Spyders and Berlinetta Speciale)
- 1955 Ferrari 857 S
- 1955 Ferrari 376 S
- 1955 Ferrari 735 LM
- 1956 Ferrari 500 TR
- 1956 Ferrari 860 Monza
- 1956 Ferrari 290 MM
- 1957 Alfa Romeo Giulietta Sprint Veloce Scaglietti
- 1954 Ferrari 375 MM Berlinetta (s/n 0402AM)
- 1957 Ferrari 410 Superamerica Coupé (s/n 0671SA)
- 1957 Ferrari 290 S, 315 S and 335 S
- 1957 Ferrari 250 GT California Spyder
- 1958 Ferrari 250 Testa Rossa
- 1958 Ferrari 312S/412 S
- 1958–9 Chevrolet Corvette Scaglietti Coupe
- 1960 Cegga 3000S (Cegga 002/60 or Ferrari Cegga 250 TR)
- 1967 Ferrari 275 GTS/4 NART Spyder

Bodies executed to a third party design:

- 1956 Ferrari 250 GT Berlinetta
- 1962 Ferrari 250 GTO
- 1963 Ferrari 250 GT Berlinetta Lusso
- 1963 Ferrari 250 LM
- 1964 Ferrari 275 GTB
- 1968–74 Dino 206 & 246
- 1968 Ferrari 365 GTB/4 'Daytona'

== Gallery ==
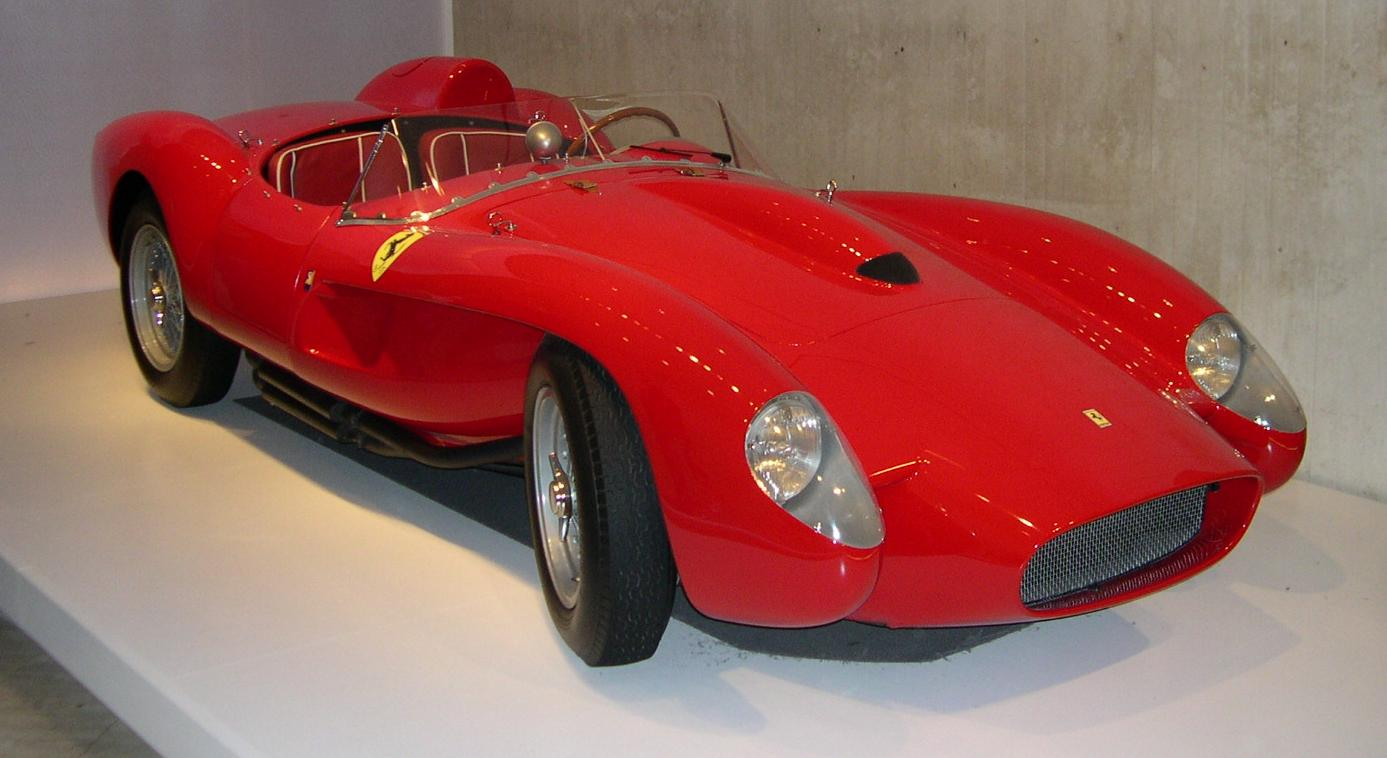
1958 Ferrari 250 Testa Rossa, designed and built by Scaglietti

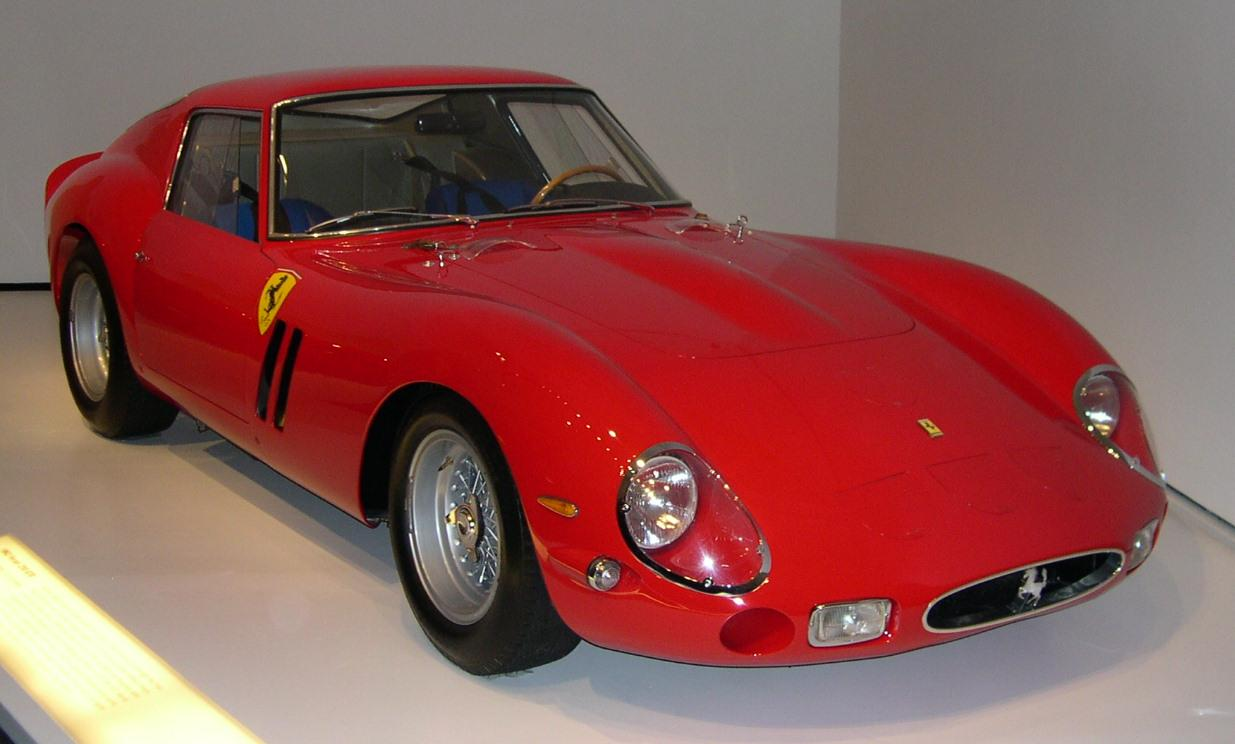
1962 250 GTO

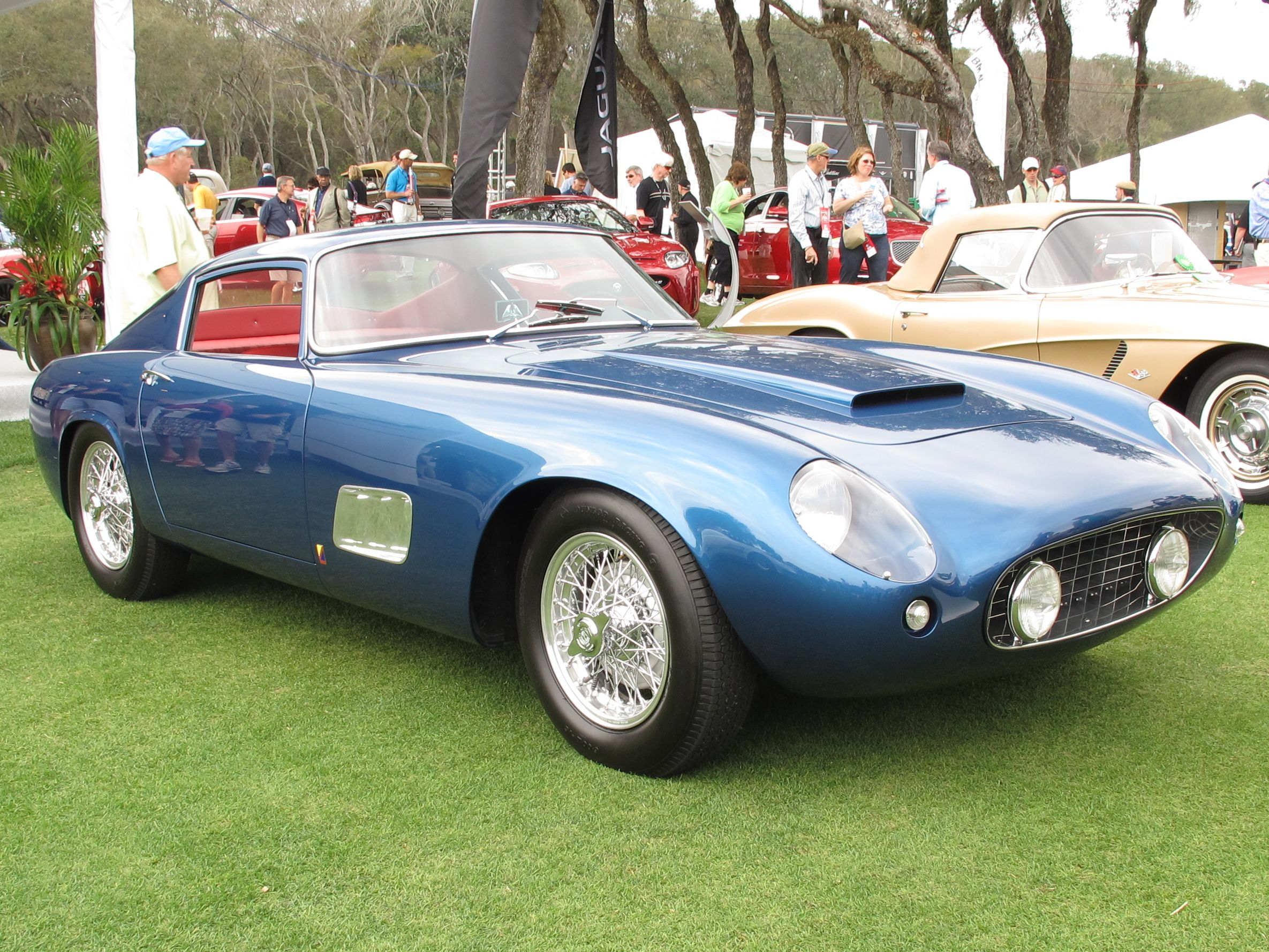
1959 Scaglietti Corvette

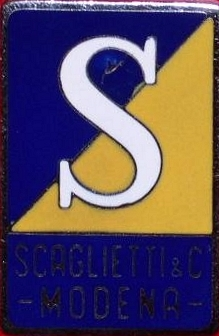
Carrozzeria Scaglietti badge on a 1958 Ferrari 250 Testa Rossa
