= 1957 Venezuelan Grand Prix =

Historic motor-race

The 1957 Gran Premio de Venezuela took place on 3 November, through a park and along the autostrada leading to Caracas. Although this was the fourth running of the race, it was the first time as a round of the F.I.A. World Sports Car Championship. The previous year's race, won by Stirling Moss, and the organiser, Touring Club Automovil de Venezuela dealt with it so well, albeit at a loss, the F.I.A. promoted the race to full World Championship status.

== Report ==
General Marcos Pérez Jiménez, the President of Venezuela, brought sports car racing to the country in 1955, which Juan Manuel Fangio won, but the organiser lost over $100,000, because no one collected the admission charges from the thousand who lined the street circuit, whilst the grandstands were empty but for officials and friends of the government. When Moss won the following season, taking home a solid gold cup, the Auto Club again made big losses. The 1957 event had to pay its own way or else.

=== Entry ===
A grand total of 41 racing cars were registered for this event, of which 37 arrived for practice and 34 qualified for the race. Although this was the last round of the championship, there were only two manufacturers who could take the world title, namely Ferrari and Maserati. As a result, the entry list for this race was almost entirely Italian. Both teams were represented by four cars in the race. Ferrari send a pair of Ferrari 335 Ss and a pair of Ferrari 250 TRs for their squad of eight drivers, while Eqiupo Maserati was represented by a pair of Maserati 450S, supported by a 300S and a 350S and their squad of eight pilots. They were backed up by a privateer entry belong to Temple Buell. If Maserati could win, they would take the manufacturers crown away from Ferrari, who had been champions since its inception, except for the brief Mercedes-Benz interlude in 1955. The only ray of hope from outside of Italy, were a works Porsche 718RSK.

=== Qualifying ===
During the two qualifying sessions held on the Thursday and Friday days prior to the race on Sunday. The Maserati of Stirling Moss emerged the fastest, putting his 450S on pole, by nearly half a second ahead of Tony Brooks in another Maserati.

=== Race ===
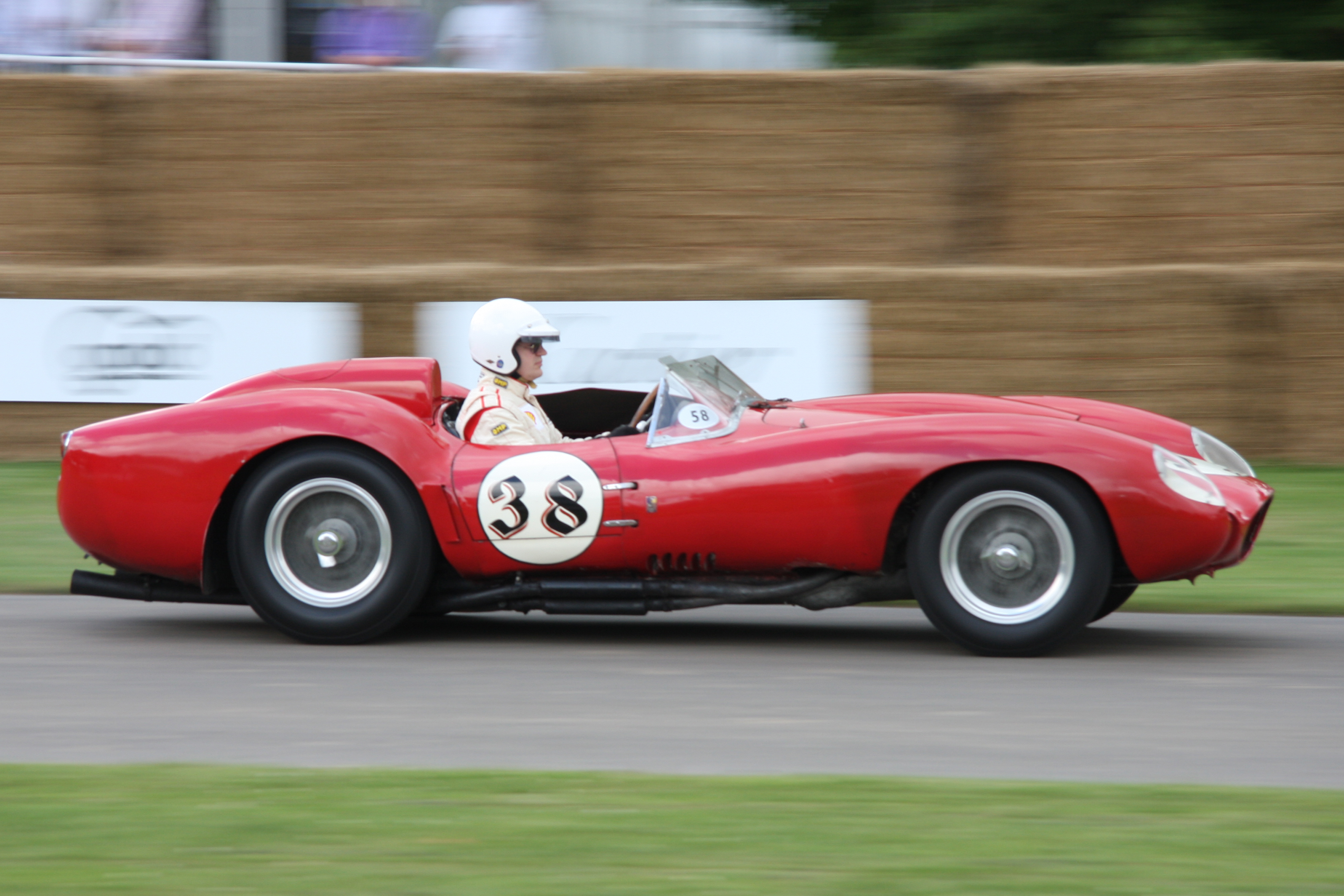
Ferrari 250 TR - similar to the car driven by von Trips / Seidel to third place

The race was held over 101 laps of the 6.170 miles track, laid out around Caracas, giving a distance of 623.193 miles (1,002.93 km). The race day dawned hot and heavy. As the cars lined up for the Le Mans style start, ready to get the race underway, Pérez Jiménez materialised and wanted to meet each of the drivers personally, so delaying the start. The President strolled among the 34 cars and their pilots who were nervously waiting under a broiling sun. When the flag finally fell, both the Maserati 450Ss stalled on the line, this enabled Dick Thompson’s Corvette to take to initial lead with the Ferrari 335 Ss in close formation behind.

As for Masten Gregory in the Temple Buell Maserati, he got off to a good start, and found it easy to past the Ferraris and Thompson on the long back straight. As Gregory braked for the narrow turn over a bridge, he glanced over his shoulder to see how far ahead of the Ferraris he was. This was a near-fatal miscalculation. In doing so, his car hit the curbing and overturned, trapping Gregory underneath. As this was on the opening lap, the Maserati would have had a full (60 gallons) tank of petrol, fearing fire he did not waiting for the marshals and kicked one of the doors off its hinges and crawled away, covered in blood from facial cuts.

Meanwhile, Jean Behra’s 450S had moved up into third place, trailing Mike Hawthorn and Peter Collins. As for Moss, he cut through the field at an incredible pace, passing 22 cars on the first lap, to cross the start line in tenth place. By lap seven, Behra had overtaken Hawthorn. By lap 16, Moss had passed both Behra and Hawthorn, and with Jo Bonnier’s 300S moving into a position of close support, raising Maserati championship hopes despite the demise of Buell's car.

On the 32nd lap, Moss had smashed the lap record and held a two-minute lead over Behra. Then disaster struck, as on the next circuit Moss flashed his headlights as a warning to Joseph Hap Dressel in a slower AC Ace. Dressel pulled right into Moss's braking line, hoping the Englishmen would tuck in behind. Moss could not and the cars collided. The AC careened into a lamppost and was cut in half, nearly costing Dressel his life. As for Moss, he was badly shaken and front end of Maserati was torn off. Just four laps later, Behra brought the remaining 450S into the pits for re-fuelling. Once the car was refulled, the mechanic pulled out the hose and Behra told to go. When he hit the starter button, there was an explosion and a belch of flame at the rear of the car, with burning petrol spewing out the fuel hose. The mechanic tried to smother the flaming hose while Behra vaulted out of the car, his overalls afire. The local fire brigade had the fire out almost as suddenly as it began. Behra was badly bruised from failing heavily on the concrete pit apron, while the mechanic, Guerino Bertocchi was painfully burned.

As for the car, it was all right, so team principal, Nello Ugolini instructed a dazed Moss to drive the smoking car, which was only three minutes behind the Ferrari. A lap later, Moss was back in pit lane, the seat was still smouldering, and so was Moss. The embers were doused, and Harry Schell took over the car. Schell was due to relieve Bonnier. Schell put up a tremendous show, pushing the 450S as fast as it could go and ultimately, he took the lead.

On lap 55, Schell was lapping Bonnier, when the slower car suffered a tyre blowout. Although Bonnier fought it, his car slewed around Schell's path. With both cars out of control, Bonnier elected to bail out at about 80 mph when he realised his car was going to collide with a lamppost. The post first cut halfway through the car, near the driver's seat, then fell brokenly on top of Schell's car; the car in flames, Schell jumped out just before the 450S hit a stone wall. At one single stroke, the last Maseratis were out of the race, and their championship hopes over.

It was all over now, and the Ferraris slowed their surviving car, ensuring they complete the remaining laps, and with the race in the bag, Scuderia Ferrari reclaimed the Manufacturers’ World Championship. As a result of the Schell/Bonnier accident, Hill and Collins in car number 14, took an impressive victory, winning in a time of 6hrs :31.55.7 mins., averaging a speed of 95.404 mph. In second was the Ferrari of Hawthorn and Musso, one lap drift. The podium was complete by another works Ferrari, of Wolfgang von Trips and Wolfgang Seidel, who were four laps adrift. Fourth place also went to the Ferrari of Olivier Gendebien and Maurice Trintignant. They drew four-abreast to cross the finish line. Huschke von Hanstein and Edgar Barth salvaged fifth overall and a class win for Porsche in their Porsche 718RSK.

Two weeks after the race, Maserati announced that a controlled administration was taking over the management of the company and that the racing department, Officine Alfieri Maserati was closed.

== Official Classification ==
Class Winners are in Bold text.

Pos	No	Class	Driver		Entrant	Chassis	Laps	Reason Out
1st	**14**	**S+2.0**	(United Kingdom) **Peter Collins**	(United States) **Phil Hill**	**Equipo Ferrari**	**Ferrari 335 S**	**6hr 31:55.8, 101**	
2nd	12	S+2.0	(United Kingdom) Mike Hawthorn	(Italy) Luigi Musso	Equipo Ferrari	Ferrari 335 S	100	
3rd	16	S+2.0	(West Germany) Wolfgang von Trips	(West Germany) Wolfgang Seidel	Equipo Ferrari	Ferrari 250 TR	97	
4th	18	S+2.0	(France) Maurice Trintignant	(Belgium) Olivier Gendebien	Equipo Ferrari	Ferrari 250 TR	97	
5th	**66**	**S2.0**	(West Germany) **Huschke von Hanstein**	(East Germany) **Edgar Barth**	**Equipo Porsche**	**Porsche 718 RSK**	**91**	
6th	30	S+2.0	(Venezuela) Mauricio Marcotulli	(Venezuela) Ettore Chimeri	Escuderia Madunina Venezuela	Maserati 300S	91	
7th	**68**	**S1.5**	(United States) **Ed Crawford**	(United States) **Ed Hugus**	Edward W. Crawford	**Porsche 550 RS**	**90**	
8th	38	S2.0	(Venezuela) Julio Pola	(Italy) Piero Drogo	Escuderia Madunina Venezuela	Ferrari 500 TR	90	
9th	60	S2.0	(Cuba) Julio Batista Falla	(Belgium) Jan de Vroom	Escuderia Cuba	Ferrari 500 TR	88	
10th	65	S1.5	(United States) Art Bunker	(Netherlands) Carel Godin de Beaufort		Porsche 550 RS	88	
11th	76	S1.5	(Italy) Umberto Masetti	(Monaco) André Testut	Equipo Monte Carlo	Osca MT4	86	
12th	22	S+2.0	(United States) Dick Thompson	(United States) Dick Doane	Equipo Corvette	Chevrolet Corvette C1	85	
13th	70	S1.5	(United States) Denise McCluggage	(United States) Ruth Levy	Denise McCluggage	Porsche 550 RS	85	
14th	40	S+2.0	(Venezuela) C. Martinez	(Venezuela) Ramón López	Escuderia Madunina Venezuela	Ferrari 500 Mondial	79	
15th	64	S1.5	(Cuba) Santiago González	(Cuba) Manuel García	Equipo Cuba	Porsche 550 RS	78	
16th	74	S2.0	(Venezuela) Augusto Gutiérrez	(Venezuela) Deblin		AC Ace	77	
17th	50	S2.0	(Colombia) Antonio Izquierdo	(Colombia) Juan Uribe	Equipo Colombia	AC Ace	76	
18th	31	S+2.0	(Venezuela) João Rozende Dos Santos	(Venezuela) Francisco Borjes		Aston Martin DB3S	76	
19th	52	S2.0	(Venezuela) Sergio González	(Argentina) Alberto Gutiérrez	Equipo C.A.D.V.	Maserati 200S	75	
20th	32	S+2.0	(Venezuela) Lino Fayen	(Venezuela) Jacques Oliver	Equipo C.A.D.V.	Trans-Oliver Mercedes-Benz (Ferrari)	74	
21st	58	S2.0	(Venezuela) Renny Ottolina	(Venezuela) Fredy Brandt	Equipo C.A.D.V.	AC Ace	72	
DNF	2	S+2.0	(France) Jean Behra (United States) Harry Schell	(United Kingdom) Stirling Moss	Equipo Maserati	Maserati 450S	55	Accident
DNF	24	S+2.0	(United States) John Kilborn	(United States) Tom Pistone	Equipo Corvette	Chevrolet Corvette C1	55	Overheating
DNF	6	S+2.0	(Sweden) Jo Bonnier	(Italy) Giorgio Scarlatti	Equipo Maserati	Maserati 300S	54	Accident
DNF	46	S2.0	(Venezuela) Silvano Turco	(Venezuela) Ugo Tosa	Escuderia Madunina Venezuela	Maserati A6G	34	DNF
DNF	4	S+2.0	(United Kingdom) Stirling Moss	(United Kingdom) Tony Brooks	Equipo Maserati	Maserati 450S	32	Accident
DNF	26	S+2.0	(United States) Jim Jeffords	(United States) Fred Windridge	Equipo Corvette	Chevrolet Corvette C1	31	Overheating
DNF	54	S2.0	(United States) Joseph Hap Dressel	(United States) Frank Pohanka	Equipo A.C. Bristol	AC Ace	25	Accident
DNF	78	S1.5	(Argentina) Luis Ojanguren	(Switzerland) Peter Monteverdi	Escuderia Madunina Venezuela	Lotus-Climax Eleven	23	DNF
DNF	56	S2.0	(Venezuela) J. L. Droullers	(Venezuela) Juan Fernández	Equipo C.A.D.V.	AC Ace	18	DNF
DNF	62	S2.0	(Argentina) Alejandro de Tomaso	(United States) Isabelle Haskell	Equipo O.S.C.A.	Osca MT4	14	DNF
DNF	10	S+2.0	(United States) Masten Gregory	(United States) Dale Duncan	Equipo Buell	Maserati 450S	1	Accident
DNS	8	S+2.0	(Venezuela) Augusto Gutiérrez (Italy) Giorgio Scarlatti	(Spain) Francisco Godia-Sales (United Kingdom) Tony Brooks	Equipo Maserati	Maserati 350S		Gearbox
DNS	28	S+2.0	(Venezuela) Guido Lollobrigita	(Venezuela) E. Soriani	Escuderia Madunina Venezuela	Ferrari		DNS
DNS	34	S2.0	(Italy) Ottavio Guarducci	(Venezuela) Azzurro Manzini	Escuderia Madunina Venezuela	Maserati A6G		DNS
DNQ	44	S2.0	(Venezuela) R. J. Dominguez	(Venezuela) C. Martinez	Escuderia Madunina Venezuela	Ferrari		DNQ
DNQ	48	S2.0	(Venezuela) Oscar Oropeza	(Venezuela) Marcelo Hernández	Equipo C.A.D.V.	AC Ace		DNQ

- Fastest Lap: Stirling Moss, 3:38.4secs (101.707 mph)

=== Class Winners ===
Class	Winners		
Sports +2000	14	Ferrari 335 S	Collins / Hill
Sports 2000	66	Porsche 718 RSK	von Hanstein / Barth
Sports 1500	68	Porsche 550 RS	Crawford / Hugus

== Standings after the race ==
Pos	Championship	Points
1	(Italy) Ferrari	30 (41)
2	(Italy) Maserati	25 (28)
3	(United Kingdom) Jaguar	17
4	(United Kingdom) Aston Martin	8
5	(West Germany) Porsche	7

- Note: Only the top five positions are included in this set of standings.

Championship points were awarded for the first six places in each race in the order of 8-6-4-3-2-1. Manufacturers were only awarded points for their highest finishing car with no points awarded for positions filled by additional cars. Only the best 4 results out of the 7 races could be retained by each manufacturer. Points earned but not counted towards the championship totals are listed within brackets in the above table.

World Sportscar Championship
Previous race: Swedish Grand Prix	1957 season	Next race: 1958 1000 km Buenos Aires
