= Maserati 450S =

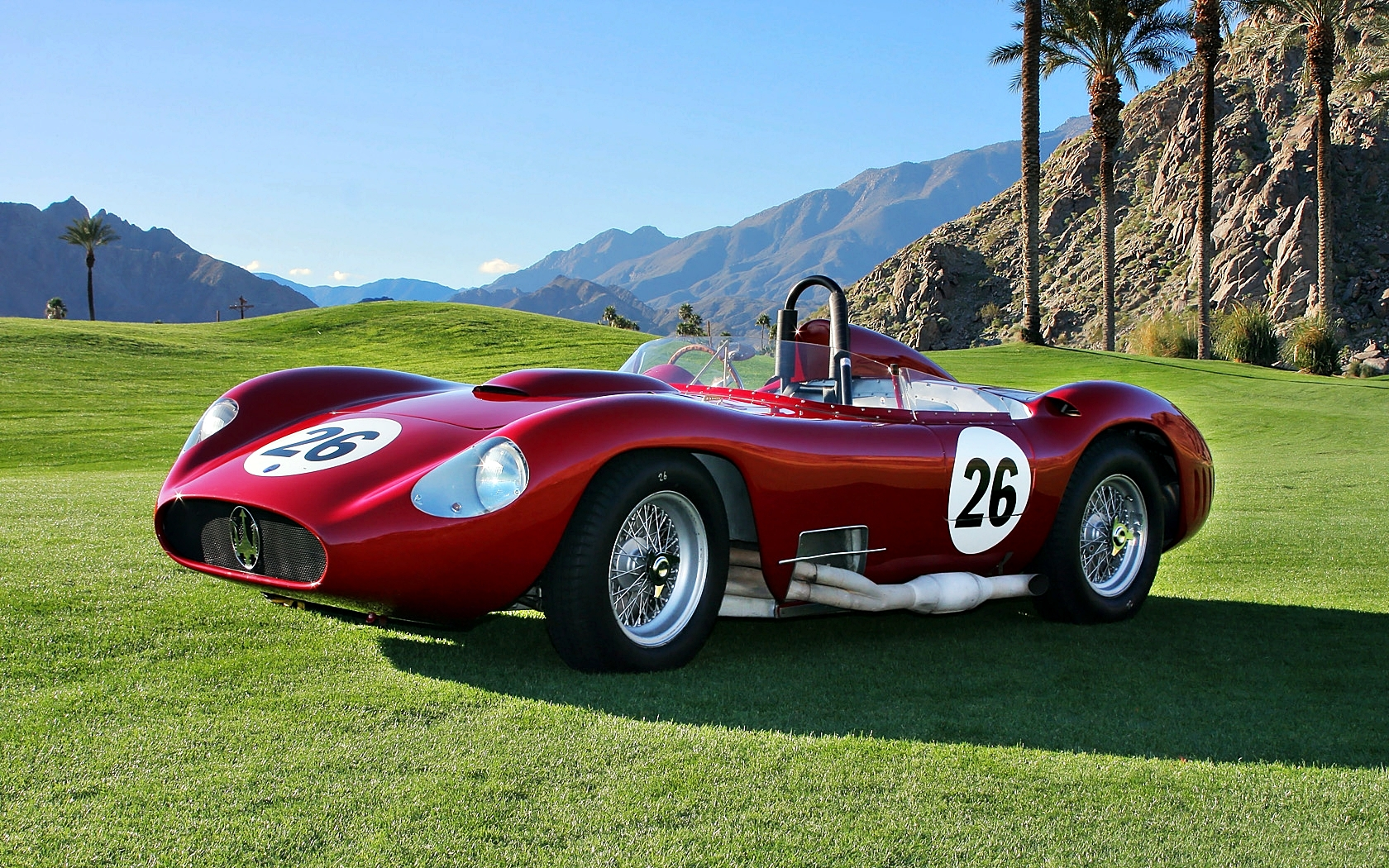
- 1957 Maserati 450S at Palm Springs 2010

Overview
- Manufacturer: Maserati
- Production: 1956–1958; 9 produced
- Assembly: Italy: Modena
- Designer: Medardo Fantuzzi (original design); Frank Costin (1957 coupe)

Body and chassis
- Class: Racing car
- Body style: 2-door speedster; 2-door coupe
- Layout: Front-engine, rear-wheel-drive

Powertrain
- Engine: 4.5-litre DOHC V8; 4.7-litre DOHC V8
- Transmission: 5-speed manual

Chronology
- Predecessor: Maserati 350S

The Maserati 450S (Tipo 54) is a Sports prototype produced by Italian automobile manufacturer Maserati for participating in FIA's endurance World Sportscar Championship racing. A total of nine were made.

Development of the 450S started in 1954 under the codename Tipo 54 led by Vittorio Bellentani and Guido Taddeucci. Their intent was to use larger engines than those then used by Maserati.

== History ==
The initial development began with the engine, which was a 4,478 cc (4.5 L) short-stroke V8 with four 45 IDM Weber carburetors mounted between the Vee, a bore x stroke of 93.8 mm × 81 mm (3.69 in × 3.19 in) and double overhead camshafts rated at 400 PS (294 kW) at 7,200 rpm. During 1957, chassis 4508 received an upgraded, 4.7-litre unit producing 410 PS (302 kW). Later on, some examples received 5.6-litre, 526 PS (387 kW) engines based on Maserati's boat racing engines.

The Tipo 54 project was shelved in 1955 after a catastrophic crash at Le Mans. In early 1956, Tony Parravano, a wealthy American housing developer, commissioned Maserati to build a new large-bore V8 engine for use in a Kurtis Indy chassis. This prompted Maserati to start working on the Tipo 54 project once again. A 350S chassis numbered 3501 was selected for testing the new engine and was elongated in order to accommodate the engine. Valerio Colotti designed the tubular frame for the chassis. The independent front suspension with double wishbones and coil-springs were retained but a much reinforced de Dion rear-end, based around a new five-speed transaxle were added. This transaxle was mounted ahead of the de Dion tube and the gearbox section was extended ahead of the final-drive instead of being integrated on the right-hand side. The drum brakes were borrowed from a 300S with improved cooling. The car had an open top body designed by Medardo Fantuzzi resembling the 300S.

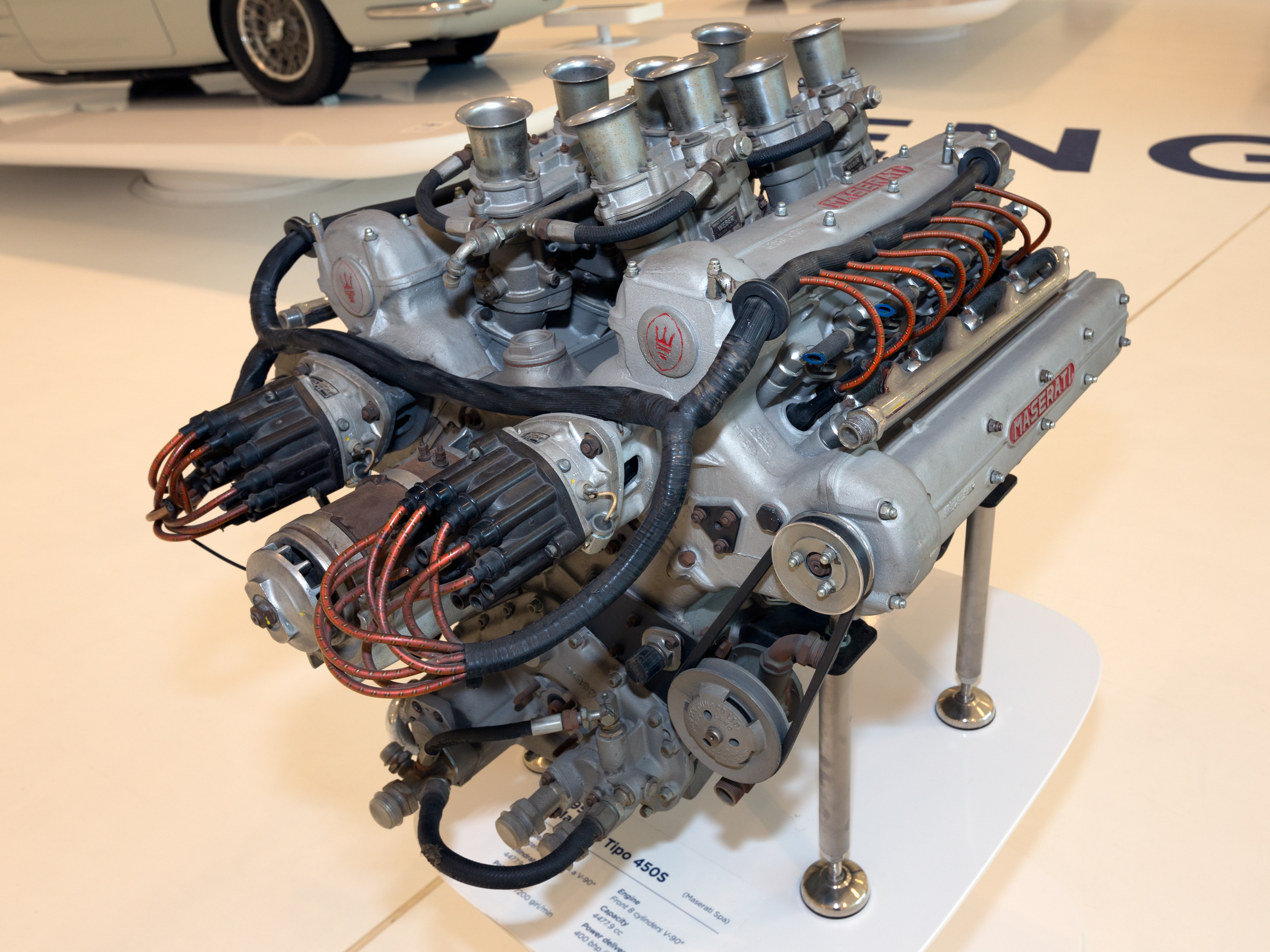
The 4.5-litre V8 engine of the 450S

The prototype made its racing debut at the 1956 Swedish Grand Prix, with the chassis being renumbered as 4501. But due to the car still being in development phase, it showed various shortcomings despite its impressive performance. The chassis proved unable to handle the power output of the V8 and the wrong firing order of the engine resulted in intolerable vibration, hampering the performance of the car. The prototype qualified third in the practice round but was not entered in the race and was instead sent back to the factory where a purpose built chassis having the same number as the prototype was constructed.

4501 was later entered at the 1957 Buenos Aires 1,000 km driven by Stirling Moss and Juan Manuel Fangio. A clutch failure after a very promising start prevented the car from commencing the season with a win. The car was redesigned as a coupé by Frank Costin of England, constructed by Zagato, and raced once again by Moss at Le Mans where it failed to finish due to major design flaws. The car was restored by Medardo Fantuzzi of Maserati (given a new chassis number 4512); and subsequently received another restoration by Faralli & Mazzanti being converted into a road car.

Chassis #4503, driven by Fangio and Jean Behra, won the 12 Hours of Sebring. It was then crashed by Behra during practice for the Mille Miglia and didn't start the race. Repaired, it was again crashed by Behra at the Le Mans 24 Hours before it won again in the hands of Behra and Moss in the Swedish Sports Car Grand Prix. In the final race of the 1957 season the Venezuelan Sports Car Grand Prix it was destroyed before being later rebuilt.

Chassis #4505 driven by Moss and Denis Jenkinson raced in the Mille Miglia until the brake pedal fell off. At the Nürburgring 1000km it was driven by Moss and Fangio and recorded another DNF when a wheel dropped off. The car was later sold to Temple Buell, who fitted it with a 5.7-litre engine and sold it to Jim Hall.

Chassis #4507 was driven by Moss and Harry Schell at the Venezuelan Sports Car Grand Prix where it was destroyed in a fiery crash that also involved chassis #4503.

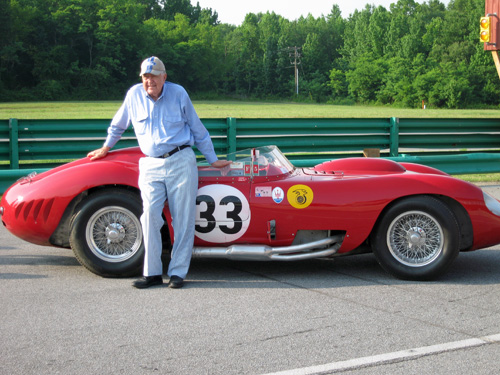
Carroll Shelby standing next to a Maserati 450S (chassis #4508) that he raced in 1957

Maserati finished the 1957 season as runners up to Ferrari in the World Sports Car Championship, its two victories at Sebring and Kristianstad, together with a second place at Buenos Aires and fourth in the Mille Miglia by its sister 300S gave Maserati a total of 25 points. Unfortunately for Maserati this was five behind Ferrari's winning total of 30 points gained from victories at Buenos Aires, the Mille Miglia and Venezuela together with a second place at the Nürburgring and Sweden.

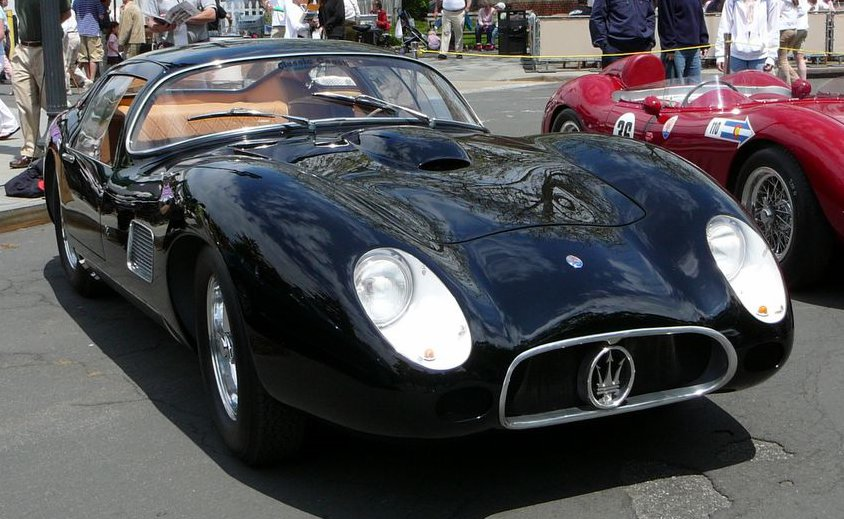
A 450S was converted to a coupé, designed by Frank Costin with the body built by Zagato

Other cars were sold to the following: Chassis #4502 to Tony Parravano, #4505 to Jim Kimberley and #4506 to John Edgar. Chassis #4509 and #4510 was sold to the US, some having engine expansions to 5.7-and 6.6-litres and used in SCCA races by Carroll Shelby, Jim Hall, Masten Gregory, Walt Cline and Ebb Rose. Chassis #4512 was originally #4501.

The 450S was raced in the 1957 World Sports Car Championship where its principal rivals were Ferrari with its Ferrari 290 MM, 315 S and 335 S models, the Jaguar D-Type and the Aston Martin DBR1. Maserati stopped entering the 450S into competition when all of the race cars entered crashed at the final round of the 1957 World Sports Car Championship in Venezuela, causing financial troubles for the company.

Between 1956 and 1962, the 450S had 119 appearances, 31 of these being victories. The 450S' racing career ended when a new 3-litre regulation was enforced for the World Sportscar Championship.

In 2015, Zagato released a car inspired by the 450S Costin Zagato Coupé at the Concorso d'Eleganza Villa d'Este: the Zagato Maserati Mostro.
