= Ferrari 290 MM =

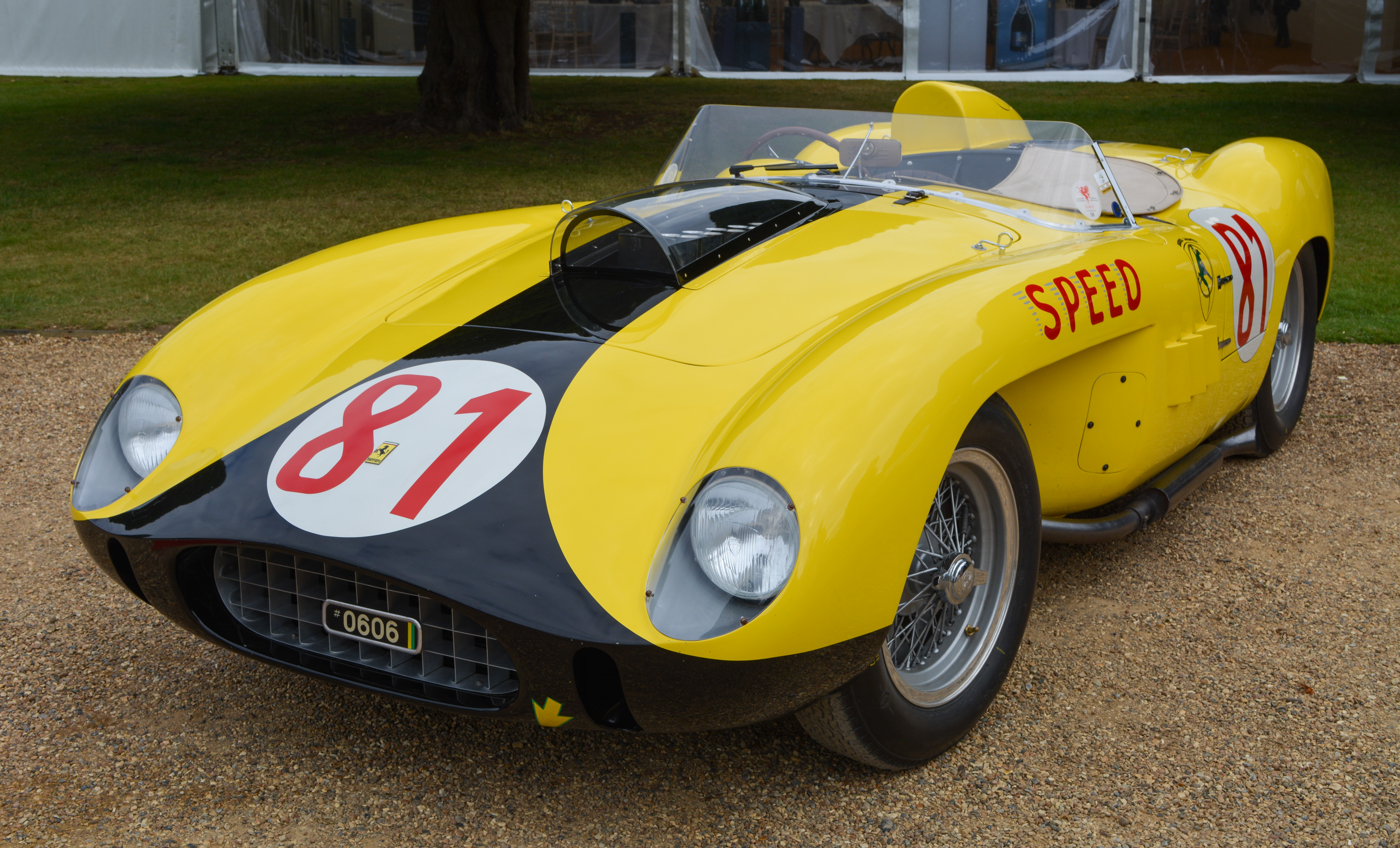

Overview
- Manufacturer: Ferrari
- Production: 1956; 4 produced (one converted from 860 Monza)
- Designer: Carrozzeria Scaglietti

Body and chassis
- Body style: 2-door Spyder
- Layout: Front mid-engine, rear-wheel-drive

Powertrain
- Engine: 3,490 cc (3.5 L) Tipo 130 Jano V12
- Power output: 320 PS (316 hp; 235 kW)
- Transmission: 4-speed manual

Dimensions
- Wheelbase: 2,350 mm (92.5 in)
- Curb weight: 880 kg (1,940 lb) (dry)

Chronology
- Predecessor: Ferrari 410 S Ferrari 860 Monza
- Successor: Ferrari 290 S

The Ferrari 290 MM is a sports racing car produced by the Italian automobile manufacturer Ferrari in 1956. It was developed to compete in the 1956 edition of Mille Miglia as a successor to the 860 Monza, hence the acronym "MM", and four cars were built.

== Development ==
In order to counter the new challenge presented by Mercedes-Benz in 1955 as the Mercedes racing team won both the World Sports Car Championship, the RAC Tourist Trophy and the Targa Florio in the same year, Ferrari set out to develop a new race car for the 1956 motorsports season called the 290 MM. The biggest change in the car was the engine as it was now powered by a new 60° Jano V12 engine with four distributors, two plugs per cylinder, uprated cylinder heads a 9:1 compression ratio and a dry-sump oil system replacing the four-cylinder engines from its predecessors. Displacement was 3,490 cc (3.5 L; 213.0 cu in) with a maximum power output of 320 PS (316 hp; 235 kW) at 7,200 rpm, and a rated top speed of 280 km/h (174 mph). It was designed by Vittorio Jano, who had joined Ferrari in 1955 after the departure of Aurelio Lampredi, in collaboration with Andrea Fraschetti and Vittorio Bellentani. The engine was based on the 4.5-litre engine used in Ferrari Grand Prix cars. The body work of the car was designed by Carrozzeria Scaglietti who incorporated a headrest bump into the aerodynamic bodywork of the car, which became an important feature of Ferrari race cars throughout the 1950s and 1960s. The car uses the Tipo 520 chassis which is shared with the 860 Monza. The chassis itself is an evolution of the Tipo 510 chassis which was used by the four-cylinder Ferrari race cars in 1955. The chassis uses two large oval tubes with small diameter tubes added in for increased stiffness. It was Ferrari's first attempt at making a spaceframe chassis. The front suspension is made up of double wishbone units while the rear-end features a DeDion axle.

== Racing history ==
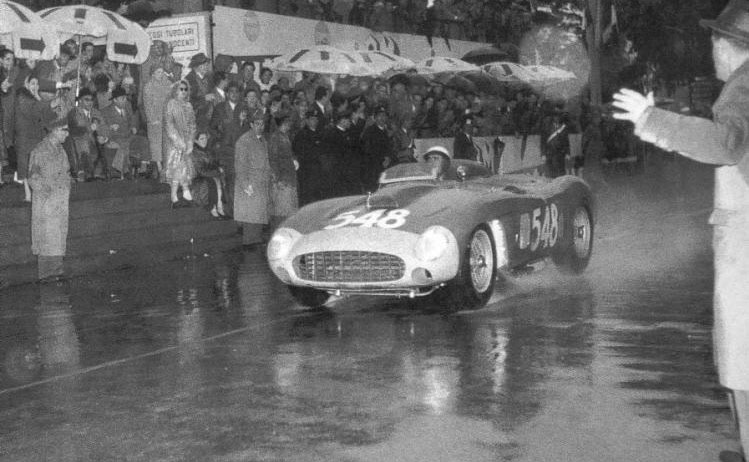
Eugenio Castellotti winning the 1956 Mille Miglia with Ferrari 290 MM

Ferrari entered five cars for the 1956 Mille Miglia a pair of 290 MMs, a pair of 860 Monzas, and a single 250 SWB GT. A 290 MM raced by Eugenio Castellotti won the event, while another 290 MM, driven by Juan Manuel Fangio, finished fourth. Phil Hill and Maurice Trintignant also won the Swedish Grand Prix of that year, granting Ferrari the overall victory in the 1956 World Sportscar Championship. The following year, in 1957, a 290 MM (converted from an 860 Monza), won the 1000 km Buenos Aires driven by Wolfgang von Trips, Alfonso de Portago and Eugenio Castellotti. Renowned racing driver Stirling Moss also drove a 290 MM at the 1957 Bahamas Speed Weeks and Nassau Trophy, winning the former race.

=== Racing Results ===
(key)

Year	Entrant	Chassis	1	2	3	4	5	6	7
1956	—		(Argentina) BUE	(United States) SEB	(Italy) MMI	(West Germany) NÜR	(Sweden) SWE		
1956	(Italy) Scuderia Ferrari	0606M					1		
1956	(Italy) Scuderia Ferrari	0616M			1	Ret	Ret		
1956	(Italy) Scuderia Ferrari	0626M			4	3	2		
1957	—		(Argentina) BUE	(United States) SEB	(Italy) MMI	(West Germany) NÜR	(France) LMS	(Sweden) SWE	(Venezuela) VEN
1957	(Belgium) Ecurie Nationale Belge	0606M					Ret	Ret	
1957	(United States) George Arents	0616M					Ret		
1957	(United States) Temple Buell	0626M	1						
1957	(Netherlands) Jan de Vroom	0628M						Ret	
1957	(Italy) Scuderia Ferrari	0628M	3	Ret					

== Production and auction details ==
Four examples of the 290 MM were built with one example (chassis # 0628) being converted from an 860 Monza in 1957. This car placed second in the 1956 Mille Miglia behind the winning 290 MM.

On December 10, 2015, RM Sotheby's sold the 290 MM driven by Juan Manuel Fangio in the 1956 Mille Miglia at auction for US$28 million — the highest price for a car sold in 2015 and the third most expensive ever at that time. In 2018, another example sold for US$22 million.
