= Råbelövsbanan =

Motor racing circuit in Kristianstad, Sweden

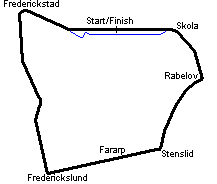
- Grand Prix Circuit (1952–1961)
- Location: Kristianstad, Scania, Sweden
- Coordinates: 56°04′46″N 14°10′05″E
- Opened: 14 September 1952; 74 years ago
- Closed: 17 September 1961; 65 years ago
- Major events: Grand Prix motorcycle racing Swedish motorcycle Grand Prix (1959, 1961); World Sportscar Championship; Swedish Grand Prix (1956–1957)

Grand Prix Circuit (1952–1961)
- Length: 6.537 km (4.062 mi)
- Turns: 10
- Race lap record: 2:20.900 ( (France) Jean Behra, Maserati 450S, 1957, Sports car racing)

Råbelövsbanan is a former racing circuit in Kristianstad, Scania, Sweden. The circuit, public roads forming roughly a triangle, is located 5 km (3.1 mi) to the north of Kristianstad, 100 km (62 mi) from Malmö. The circuit has a length of 6.537 km (4.062 mi) and width of 6–8 m (20–26 ft). The circuit was named after the Råbelöv Castle.

== History ==
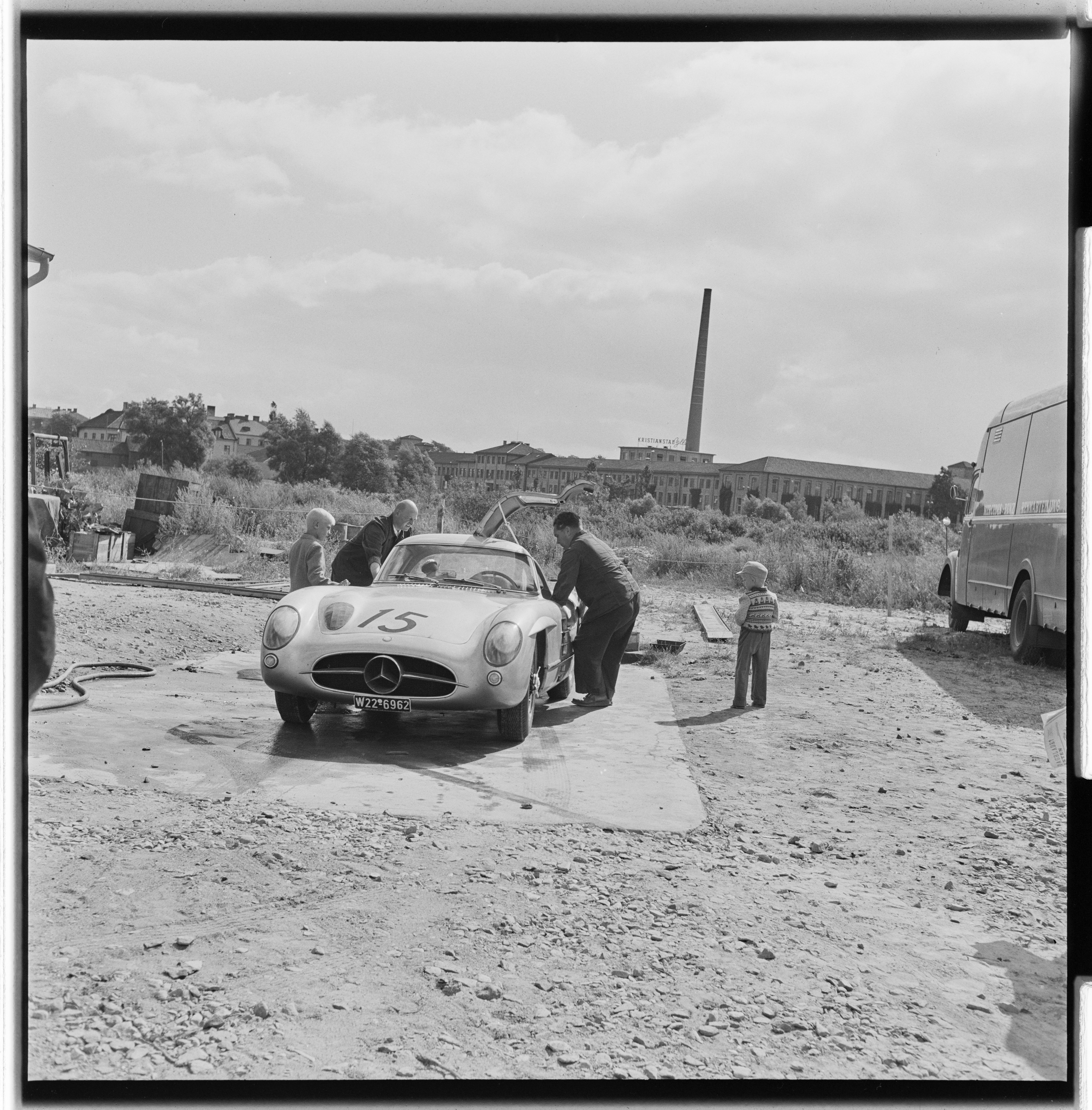
Uhlenhaut Coupé with No. 15 in Sweden

The circuit, run clockwise in open landscape, was opened on 14 September 1952.

The circuit was upgraded for 1955, the year that was overshadowed by the Le Mans disaster in June after which many major races in Europe were cancelled, among them the two German World Championship races for 1955 F1 and the 1955 World Sportscar Championships. The Swedish race took place on 7 August 1955 and the Mercedes factory team took the opportunity to race again, winning 1-2 with few opposition despite most factory team having filed entries.

Due to the successful Swedish exhibition event of 1955, and several other tracks not being available for the 1956 World Sportscar Championship, Kristianstad was made part of the WSC calendar in 1956–1957. Later, Grand Prix motorcycle racing held races in 1959 and 1961. Besides the world championship races, the circuit also hosted Skåneloppet motorcycle races between 1952 and 1956.

After the 1961 Swedish motorcycle Grand Prix, no races were held, the circuit was closed and equipment was sold off. A memorial event took place in 1995. The western and eastern parts of the circuits are country roads, connected now by a roundabout. The northern part that closes the triangle, called Grand Prix-vägen, was reduced to gravel surface despite serving as access road to a school, Resursskola Råbelövstorp. The location of the pit area is still recognisable.

== Winners ==
Not part of the 1955 World Sportscar Championship was the 7 August 1955 Swedish Grand Prix won by Juan Manuel Fangio on Mercedes-Benz 300 SLR ahead of teammate Stirling Moss.

=== World Sportscar Championship ===
Year	Date	Winning drivers	Winning team	Winning car	Report
1956	August 12	(United States) Phil Hill (France) Maurice Trintignant	(Italy) Scuderia Ferrari	(Italy) Ferrari 290 MM	Report
1957	August 8	(France) Jean Behra (United Kingdom) Stirling Moss	(Italy) Officine Alfieri Maserati	(Italy) Maserati 450S	Report

=== Grand Prix motorcycle racing ===
Year	Date	125cc		250cc		350cc		500cc		Report
Year	Date	Rider	Manufacturer	Rider	Manufacturer	Rider	Manufacturer	Rider	Manufacturer	Report
1959	July 26	(Italy) Tarquinio Provini	(Italy) MV Agusta	(Federation of Rhodesia and Nyasaland) Gary Hocking	(West Germany) MZ	(United Kingdom) John Surtees	(Italy) MV Agusta	(Australia) Bob Brown †	(United Kingdom) Norton †	Report
1961	September 17	(Switzerland) Luigi Taveri	(Japan) Honda	(United Kingdom) Mike Hailwood	(Japan) Honda	(Czech Republic) František Šťastný	(Czech Republic) Jawa	(Federation of Rhodesia and Nyasaland) Gary Hocking	(Italy) MV Agusta	Report

† Race did not count towards the World Championship.

== Lap records ==
The fastest official race lap records at the Rabelövsbanan are listed as:

Category	Time	Driver	Vehicle	Event
Grand Prix Circuit (1952–1961): 6.537 km (4.062 mi)
Sports car racing	2:20.900	Jean Behra	Maserati 450S	1957 Swedish Grand Prix
500cc	2:22.300	Gary Hocking	MV Agusta 500 4C	1961 Swedish motorcycle Grand Prix
250cc	2:31.000	Jim Redman	Honda RC162	1961 Swedish motorcycle Grand Prix
350cc	2:36.500	John Surtees	MV Agusta 350 4C	1959 Swedish motorcycle Grand Prix
125cc	2:49.600	Luigi Taveri	Honda 2RC143	1961 Swedish motorcycle Grand Prix
