= Swedish Grand Prix =

Formula One Grand Prix

- Scandinavian Raceway

Race information
- Number of times held: 14
- First held: 1933
- Last held: 1978
- Most wins (drivers): (South Africa) Jody Scheckter (2) (Austria) Niki Lauda (2)
- Most wins (constructors): (United Kingdom) Tyrrell (2)
- Circuit length: 4.031 km
- Race length: 282.170 km
- Laps: 70

Last race (1978)

Pole position
- (United States) Mario Andretti; Lotus-Ford; 1:22.058

Podium
- 1. (Austria) Niki Lauda; Brabham-Alfa Romeo; 1:41:00.606; 2. (Italy) Riccardo Patrese; Arrows-Ford; +34.019; 3. (Sweden) Ronnie Peterson; Lotus-Ford; +34.105

Fastest lap
- (Austria) Niki Lauda; Brabham-Alfa Romeo; 1:24.836

The Swedish Grand Prix (Swedish: Sveriges Grand Prix) was a round of the Formula One World Championship from 1973 to 1978. It took place at the Scandinavian Raceway in Anderstorp (Gislaved Municipality), about 65 kilometres (40 mi) from Jönköping, in Småland, Sweden. The first race to hold the title of Grand Prix in Sweden was the Swedish Winter Grand Prix, an ice race similar to races held in Estonia, Finland and Norway. The first Swedish Summer Grand Prix was held in 1933, but was not repeated until 1949.

The first races with the title Swedish Grand Prix were three sports car races held at Råbelövsbanan starting in 1955. A Formula Two race held in 1967 also carried the title.

== History ==
=== Origins ===
While racing in Sweden had a long history it was not until 1931 that a race was first titled Grand Prix. The first Swedish Winter Grand Prix was held on a mammoth 46 kilometre circuit near Lake Rämen about 2 hours northwest of Stockholm in the snow and freezing cold with a lap time of approximately 35 minutes. In 1933 the first Swedish Summer Grand Prix was held on another huge 30 kilometre circuit made of public roads at Norra Vram, not far north from Malmö, a race which can be better compared to modern Grands Prix. The opening lap saw a multi-car pile-up which saw several drivers injured, two seriously, and a riding mechanic was killed. One of the crashed cars started a fire which saw a nearby house burned to the ground. The race continued while emergency services attended the scene and the race was eventually won by Antonio Brivio in an Alfa Romeo (for Scuderia Ferrari). Major racing came to a halt after that.

=== Kristianstad ===
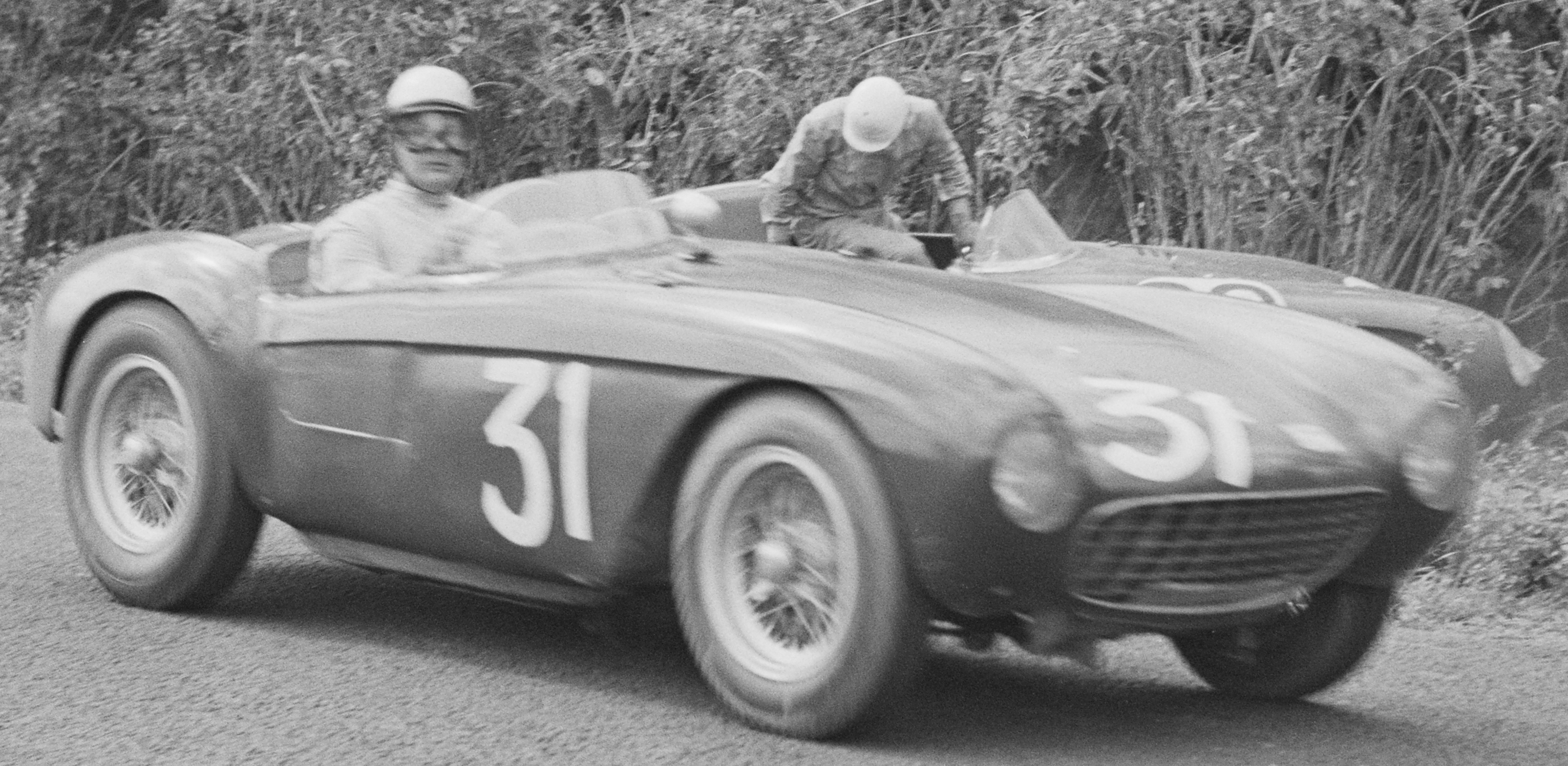
#31, a Ferrari 500 Mondial #0408MD driven by Valdemar Stener in the 1955 Swedish GP

==== 1955 ====
The first postwar Grand Prix (a sports car event) was held on 7 August 1955, only a few weeks after the Le Mans tragedy. 75,000 spectators surrounded the 6.537 km (4.062 mi)-long Råbelövsbanan circuit, located near Kristianstad. As the German 1955 1000km Nürburgring was cancelled, the Swedish GP saw the return of the Mercedes-Benz 300 SLR. Two were entered, for Juan Manuel Fangio and Stirling Moss. Other entrants included Peter Collins and Roy Salvadori (the works Aston Martin DB3Ss), Eugenio Castellotti (the sole works Ferrari 735 LM), and the works Maserati 300S of Jean Behra.

Unusually, the race used a Le Mans start. It proved to be "a dull procession", with Moss leading lap one, while Fangio took command on lap two and held the lead for the next 31 laps to the checkered flag. As in the non-championship Eifelrennen held in May, Fangio finished just tenths of seconds ahead of his teammate Moss who won all the championship sports car races for Mercedes. Apart from the Mercedes duo, only Castellotti (who came third) and Behra finished.

==== 1956 ====
After the track was resurfaced and widened, following it being named an event on the 1956 World Sportscar Championship calendar, in 1956, another event was held. It drew a larger field, including works Ferrari and Maserati teams and Ecurie Ecosse's Le Mans-winning D-types, and ran 153 laps.

Collins took an early lead in the Ferrari 290 MM, pursued by Moss' 300S and Mike Hawthorn's Ferrari 860 Monza. At the first pit stop, Moss came out first. Behra (sharing Moss' 300S) suffered brake trouble and Olivier Gendebien (in Collins' Ferrari) had an oil leak. The oil led to a wreck involving Gendebien's teammates Collins (taking over for Wolfgang von Trips) and Phil Hill (in the car started by Maurice Trintignant). This put the Ferrari shared between Castellotti and Fangio well ahead. Moss took over the Maserati of Luigi Villoresi and Harry Schell, only for it to have trouble with its brakes, as well. The car Moss started caught fire in a pit stop debacle. Castellotti's engine blew in the lead, giving the Trintignant/Hill 250MM the win, followed home by von Trips/Collins in the second 250MM, and Hawthorne/Alfonso de Portago/Duncan Hamilton in an 860 Monza.

==== 1957 ====
The last sports car Grand Prix at Råbelövsbanan was in 1957, a six-hour World Sportscar Championship race, rather than 1,000 km (620 mi). It was dominated by the Maserati 450S shared by Moss and Behra, which "romped home" in front of the Ferrari 335 S of Hill and Collins. In addition, Moss co-drove the 300S of Jo Bonnier/Giorgio Scarlatti/Harry Schell, which came third. Hawthorne and Luigi Musso placed fourth in a 335 S.

=== Karlskoga ===
In 1967, the name Swedish Grand Prix was, as a one-off name, given to that year's Kanonloppet in Karlskoga. It was run to Formula Two rules and was won by Jackie Stewart.

=== Anderstorp ===
Ronnie Peterson's success with Team Lotus was the catalyst for a Swedish Grand Prix and the race was held for the first time in 1973 at the grandly-named Scandinavian Raceway, about two hours east of Gothenburg in the middle of southern Sweden- this circuit, much like Watkins Glen in the eastern United States, was very isolated and people often either camped out or stayed in local people's homes, which were few and far between in the nearmost town of Anderstorp, a town with a population of less than 5,000; the larger town of Gislaved not providing much more accommodation. Peterson did not disappoint his fans in qualifying, taking pole in his Lotus. For 70 laps it looked like this was going to be a one-two for Team Lotus with Peterson first and world champion Emerson Fittipaldi second. However disaster struck when Fittipaldi retired with gearbox failure. Meanwhile, Denny Hulme was quickly closing the gap on the lead, Peterson having major trouble with tire wear and fighting to stay on the track. On the 79th, penultimate, lap Hulme was able to pass the local hero to snatch victory, the New Zealander's decision to run harder tires on his McLaren-Cosworth having paid off. Peterson was second. That was as close as any Swede came to winning on home soil. During the 1973 season, the Cosworth DFV powered the winner in every single race in the 15-race season, a performance never repeated.

In 1974, the Swedish Grand Prix was totally dominated by the two Tyrrell 007-Cosworths of Jody Scheckter and Patrick Depailler. It was the Frenchman who took pole, however Scheckter beat him by 0.380 sec in the race. This was the South African's first Grand Prix win.

In 1975, Austrian Niki Lauda's second year with Ferrari, the team provided him with the 312T – a car that was technically far superior to any of the competition. He won his first world title that year with 5 wins and a huge margin over second place in the championship. At Anderstorp he took his third consecutive win of the season after the Monaco and Belgian Grands Prix. Qualifying resulted in pole position for Vittorio Brambilla in his March, Lauda qualified fifth fastest and his teammate Clay Regazzoni 11th. In the race Brambilla took the lead, but by lap 16 he was overtaken by Carlos Reutemann's Brabham. Meanwhile, Lauda was steadily progressing through the field and on lap 42 he was second. He put a series of fastest laps, closed on Reutemann and overtook him to win the Grand Prix by 6 seconds. Reutemann finished second with Regazzoni in the second Ferrari 312T third. The 1976 Swedish GP saw the first (and only) win of a 6-wheel car – the Tyrrell P34. The theory was that its four tiny front wheels would increase mechanical front-end grip – with more rubber on the road – and thus eliminate understeer while at the same time improve cornering and braking. When it was revealed it was the instant sensation of the 1976 season. The car was a photo opportunity on wheels – six of them, which was precisely why – and must have given Elf more free publicity in the 1976 pre-season and beyond than it garnered during the whole of 1974 and 1975. Tyrrell's Jody Scheckter took pole, with Patrick Depailler in fourth. In the race the Tyrrells strode imperiously to a crushing one-two. The South African, who when later probed confided that he thought the six-wheeled concept ridiculous, was beaming on the podium. However the Swedish walkover proved to be a fluke, and the P34 never won a race again. At Anderstorp, Jacques Laffite in his Gitanes sponsored Ligier-Matra put in a commanding display, romping to victory in the 1977 Swedish GP. France had been put back on the map: that was the first time that a French car with a French engine, backed by a French company, and driven by a French driver had won a Grand Prix.

==== 1978 race and the Brabham "fan car" ====
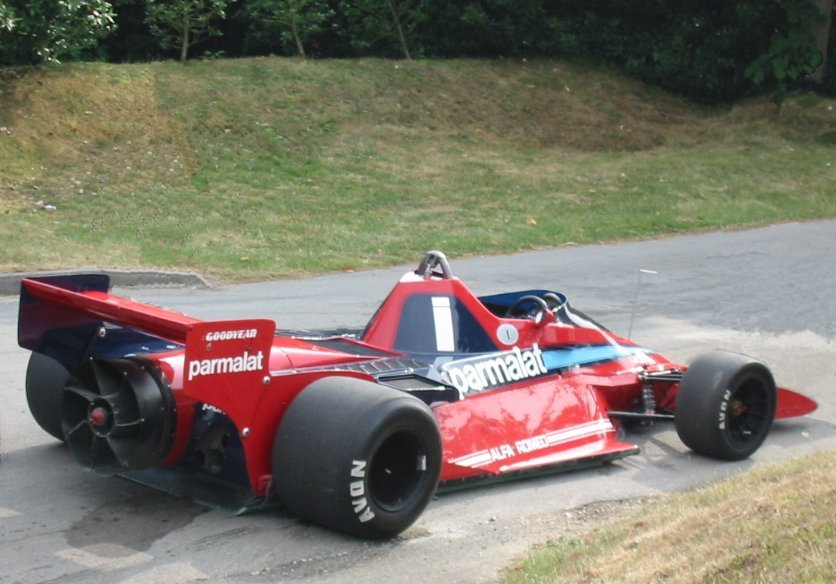
Brabham BT46B "fan car"

The 1978 Swedish GP saw the only appearance in Formula One of the Brabham BT46B. Designed by Brabham's Gordon Murray, who was trying to eclipse Colin Chapman's ground effect invention on the Lotus 79, the car featured a large fan pulling air from under the bottom of the car to create additional downforce. Its legality was soon protested, but it was allowed to race, Niki Lauda and John Watson qualifying 2nd and 3rd behind the Lotus 79 of Mario Andretti. Andretti eventually dropped out due to a broken valve, allowing Lauda into the lead. Once a back-marker dropped oil onto the track, the Brabham was in a race of its own, seemingly unaffected by the slippery surface. Lauda went on to win by 34.6 seconds. The "fan car" was later voluntarily withdrawn by Brabham, and never raced again. The car had, however, been deemed legal, allowing the win to stand, which also cost Arrows their chance of victory in their debut season.

There has been no Swedish Grand Prix since 1978. The deaths of both Ronnie Peterson and Gunnar Nilsson that year contributed to the demise of this round of the world championship, as interest for Formula One in Sweden fell as a result. The race was scheduled for the 1979 season, but was cancelled before being run, due to lack of local sponsorships.

== Winners ==
The races before 1956 were formally called the Swedish Summer Grand Prix.

=== By year ===
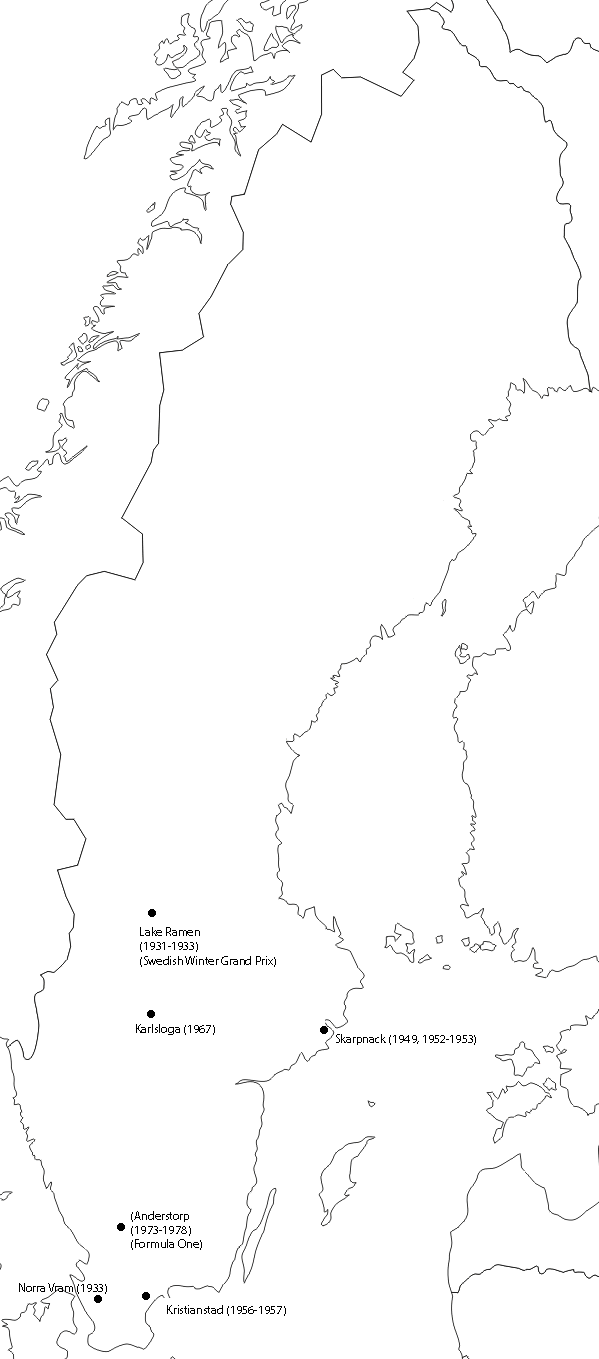
A map of all the locations of the Swedish Grand Prix

A pink background indicates an event which was not part of the Formula One World Championship.

Year	Driver	Constructor	Location	Report
1933	(Italy) Antonio Brivio	Alfa Romeo	Norra Vram	Report
1934 – 1948	Not held			
1949	(Thailand) B. Bira	Maserati	Skarpnäck	Report
1950 – 1954	Not held			
1955	(Argentina) Juan Manuel Fangio	Mercedes-Benz	Råbelövsbanan	Report
1956	(United States) Phil Hill (France) Maurice Trintignant	Ferrari	Råbelövsbanan	Report
1957	(France) Jean Behra (United Kingdom) Stirling Moss	Maserati	Råbelövsbanan	Report
1958 – 1966	Not held			
1967	(United Kingdom) Jackie Stewart	Matra-Cosworth	Karlskoga	Report
1968 – 1972	Not held			
1973	(New Zealand) Denny Hulme	McLaren-Ford	Anderstorp	Report
1974	(South Africa) Jody Scheckter	Tyrrell-Ford	Anderstorp	Report
1975	(Austria) Niki Lauda	Ferrari	Anderstorp	Report
1976	(South Africa) Jody Scheckter	Tyrrell-Ford	Anderstorp	Report
1977	(France) Jacques Laffite	Ligier-Matra	Anderstorp	Report
1978	(Austria) Niki Lauda	Brabham-Alfa Romeo	Anderstorp	Report

=== Repeat winners (drivers) ===
Wins	Driver	Years won
2	(South Africa) Jody Scheckter	1974, 1976
2	(Austria) Niki Lauda	1975, 1978

=== Repeat winners (constructors) ===
A pink background indicates an event which was not part of the Formula One World Championship.

Teams in bold are competing in the Formula One championship in 2026.

Wins	Constructor	Years won
2	(Italy) Maserati	1949, 1957
2	**(Italy) Ferrari**	1956, 1975
2	(United Kingdom) Tyrrell	1974, 1976

=== Repeat winners (engine manufacturers) ===
A pink background indicates an event which was not part of the Formula One World Championship.

Manufacturers in bold are competing in the Formula One championship in 2026.

Wins	Manufacturer	Years won
3	(United States) Ford *	1973, 1974, 1976
2	(Italy) Maserati	1949, 1957
2	**(Italy) Ferrari**	1956, 1975
2	(Italy) Alfa Romeo	1933, 1978

* Built by Cosworth
