= 1956 1000 km of Nürburgring =

Sports car endurance race in Germany

The 2. Internationales ADAC 1000 Kilometer Rennen auf dem Nürburgring took place on 27 May 1956, on the Nürburgring Nordschleife, (West Germany). It was also the fourth round of the F.I.A. World Sports Car Championship. This was only the second time the event had taken place, since its inaugural event 1953 1000 km of Nürburgring had poor attendance, thus the 1954 event was not held. Like many other races, the 1955 issue was cancelled after the Le Mans tragedy, resp. only held as a 500km race for 1500cc cars.

It was also round two of the German Sportscar Championship.

Nürburgring Nordschleife

== Report ==
=== Entry ===
A grand total 71 racing cars were registered for this event, of which 61 arrived for practice and qualifying. Fresh from their domination on the Mille Miglia, came two work teams of Scuderia Ferrari, and Officine Alfieri Maserati. The team from Maranello arrived with four cars, two 860 Monzas and two 290 MMs. The pairing to beat was that of Juan Manuel Fangio and Eugenio Castellotti driving the more powerful 860 Monza. This car was powered by a 3.4 litre 4-cylinder engine, producing 280 bhp. Their Modenese rivals, who were 12 points going into the meeting need a victory to reopened the Constructors’ Championship. Do to this, their arrived with four cars, two 300Ss, plus a 350s and a 150S. Their stars drivers, headed by the young Englishman, Stirling Moss, were in the 300Ss with a smaller 3.0 litre 6-cylinder engine, but it still produced 245 bhp.

=== Qualifying ===
Qualifying was held over three sessions for a total of 1,590 minutes over the three prior to the race. The Ferrari 860 Monza of Fangio took pole position, averaging a speed of 84.534 mph around the 14.173 mile circuit. This was an incredible lap time, especially when compared to the time set by team-mate Luigi Musso, into the slower 290 MM – which was a full three seconds slower. The ’53 pole winner was on pole yet again, having given everyone a lesson on how to drive the 174 corner of the ‘Ring. When the finish session had finished, Ferrari had secured the first three places, the 300S driver by Moss and Jean Behra was fourth. The first non-Italian car was fifth, the Jaguar D-Type of Mike Hawthorn and Desmond Titterington.

=== Race ===
The day of the race would be warm and dry, with a crowd of approximately 70,000 in attendance to witness for is regarded one of Maserati’s finest ever race victory.

The start of the 1,000 kilometer race did not bode well for the Modenese marque, despite Moss taking the lead. On lap 11, after Behra had replaced Moss after the first pit stop, the rear transverse leaf spring of their 300S broke, forcing the Frenchman to the wheel of the second 300S. This was being driven by Harry Schell and Piero Taruffi, which was laying in third place at the time. Behra immediately embarked on charge back through the field to catch the leading Ferrari of Fangio and Castellotti. It was then decided by the team to put Moss into the car. At this point of the race, Moss was lying 66 seconds behind Fangio.

As soon as Moss got into the car, he began to lap the 22km circuit at a pace that no-one would match. He was lapping 4/5 seconds faster than the ‘Maestro’ Fangio. At this pace, the seemingly safe win in the hands of the Ferrari duo, suddenly was in doubt. On lap 26 of the 44 scheduled, Fangio was unhappy with his car’s handling, so he got his mechanics to check its suspension while refueling, losing about a minute in the process. Sensing the threat to his victory, Fangio delayed handed the car over to Castellotti, as long as possible, in an attempt to stave off Moss’s assault. However, the fate of the race was sealed, when the lap 40, the “Maestro” re-entered to pits for fuel, the 300S of Moss charged on towards an astounding victory.

The winning partnership of Moss/Behra/Taruffi/Schell, won in a time of 7hr 43:54.5mins., averaging a speed of 80.658 mph. The margin of triumph over the Ferrari of Fangio/Castelloti was 26 seconds, and led another Ferrari driven by Hill/De Portago/Gendebien by 10 min 01.4s. Porsche snatched fourth place with Wolfgang von Trips/Umberto Maglioli, but their 550 RS finished almost 20 minutes adrift of the Maserati. Moss's pace was so quick that he lapped event he fifth placed Aston Martin DB3S of Peter Collins and Tony Brooks. Race did not end when Moss cross the finishing line, but continued for another hour to allow the other classes/division to try and complete the full 1000 km.

To add to Fangio's woes, Ferrari mechanics checked his after the race and found his 860 Monza did not actually problem with its suspension, as the quirky handling had simply been caused by the wrong tyre pressures.

== Official Classification ==
Class Winners are in Bold text.

Pos	No	Class	Driver		Entrant	Chassis	Laps	Reason Out
1st	**6**	**S+2.0**	(Italy) **Piero Taruffi** (France) **Jean Behra**	(United States) **Harry Schell** (United Kingdom) **Stirling Moss**	**Officine Alfieri Maserati**	**Maserati 300S**	**7hr 43:54.5, 44**	
2nd	1	S+2.0	(Argentina) Juan Manuel Fangio	(Italy) Eugenio Castellotti	Scuderia Ferrari	Ferrari 860 Monza	7hr 44:20.7, 44	
3rd	4	S+2.0	(United States) Phil Hill (Belgium) Olivier Gendebien	(Spain) Alfonso de Portago	Scuderia Ferrari	Ferrari 290 MM	7hr 53:55.9, 44	
4th	**21**	**S1.5**	**(West Germany) Wolfgang von Trips**	**(Italy) Umberto Maglioli**	**Porsche**	**Porsche 550 RS**	**8hr 01:45.9, 44**	
5th	9	S+2.0	(United Kingdom) Peter Collins	(United Kingdom) Tony Brooks	David Brown	Aston Martin DB3S	43	
6th	20	S1.5	(West Germany) Richard von Frankenberg	(West Germany) Hans Herrmann	Porsche	Porsche 550 RS	44	
7th	26	S1.5	(East Germany) Edgar Barth	(East Germany) Arthur Rosenhammer	VEB	AWE R3/55	43	
DNF	31	S+2.0	(United Kingdom) Mike Hawthorn	(United Kingdom) Desmond Titterington	Jaguar Cars Ltd.	Jaguar D-Type	43	Driveshaft
DNF	10	S+2.0	(United Kingdom) Peter Walker	(United Kingdom) Roy Salvadori	David Brown	Aston Martin DB3S	41	De Dion tube
8th	**56**	**GT/T+2.0**	**(Sweden) Bengit Martenson**	**(West Germany) Wittigo von Einsedel**	**Bengit O. Martenson**	**Mercedes-Benz 300 SL**	**44**	
9th	**61**	**GT/T2.0**	**(West Germany) Max Nathan**	**(Sweden) Gert Kaiser**	**Max Nathan**	**Porsche 356 Carrera**	**44**	
10th	65	GT/T2.0	(West Germany) Helmut Schülze	(Portugal) Joaquim Felipe Nogueira	Helmut Schülze	Porsche 356 Carrera	44	
11th	**81**	**GT/T1.3**	**(Sweden) Jo Bonnier**	**(United States) Herbert MacKay-Fraser**	**Jo Bonnier**	**Alfa Romeo Giulietta Veloce**	**43**	
12th	83	GT/T1.3	(Switzerland) Walter Ringgenberg	(Switzerland) Heini Walter	Walter Ringgenberg	Alfa Romeo Giulietta Veloce	43	
13th	**43**	**ser.S1.5**	**(West Germany) Friedrich Kretschmann**	**(West Germany) Sepp Liebl**	**Friedrich Kretschmann**	**Porsche 550**	**43**	
14th	87	GT/T2.0	(Italy) Piero Carini	(Italy) Franco Bordoni	Piero Carini	Alfa Romeo Giulietta Veloce	42	
15th	63	GT/T2.0	(West Germany) Helmut Zick	(West Germany) Hans-Gerog Plaut	Hans Gerog Plaut	Porsche 356 Carrera	42	
16th	88	GT/T1.3	(Belgium) Gilberte Thirion	(Italy) Ada Pace	Gilberte Thirion	Alfa Romeo Giulietta Veloce	42	
17th	53	GT/T+2.0	(West Germany) Rainer Günzler	(West Germany) Helmut Retter	Rainer Günzler	Mercedes-Benz 220S	42	
18th	86	GT/T1.3	(West Germany) Adolf-Werner Lang	(West Germany) Kurt Kuhnke	Adolf-Werner Lang	Alfa Romeo Giulietta Veloce	41	
19th	64	GT/T1.3	(West Germany) Kurt Zeller	(West Germany) Wolfgang Bieling	Kurt Zeller	Alfa Romeo Giulietta Veloce	40	
20th	64	GT/T2.0	(West Germany) W. H. Wittmann	(West Germany) Walter Hampel	W. H. Wittmann	Porsche 356 Super 1600	40	
21st	76	GT/T1.3	(West Germany) Helmut Busch	(West Germany) Horst Bös	Helmut Busch	Porsche 356 Super 1300	40	
22nd	77	GT/T1.3	(West Germany) Sepp Greger	(West Germany) Harald von Saucken	Sepp Greger	Porsche 356A Super 1300	40	
23rd	78	GT/T1.3	(West Germany) Hartmuth Oesterle	(West Germany) Siegfried Günther	Hartmuth Oesterle	Porsche 356 Super 1300	40	
24th	45	ser.S1.5	(Netherlands) Mathieu Hezemans	(Netherlands) Carel Godin de Beaufort	Gotfrid Köchert	Porsche 550	38	
25th	72	GT/T1.3	(West Germany) Helmut Deutenberg	(West Germany) Heinz-Gerd Jäger	Helmut Deutenberg	Porsche 356 Super 1300	39	
26th	74	GT/T1.3	(West Germany) Karl Falk	(West Germany) Albert Joch	Karl Falk	Porsche 356 Super 1300	39	
DNF	27	S1.5	(East Germany) Paul Thiel	(East Germany) Egon Binner	VEB	AWE R3/55	29	Engine
DNF	31	S1.5	(Monaco) Louis Chiron	(Italy) Luigi Villoresi	Monte Carlo Sport	Osca MT4 1500	26	Engine
DNF	38	S1.5	(Argentina) Carlo Tomasi	(Argentina) Alejandro de Tomaso	Isabel Haskell	Maserati 150S	25	Engine
DISQ	33	S1.5	(Netherlands) Hans Tak	(Netherlands) Henk van Zalinge	Beels Racing	Maserati 150S	22	Assistance
DNF	5	S+2.0	(United Kingdom) Stirling Moss	(France) Jean Behra	Officine Alfieri Maserati	Maserati 300S	19	Suspension
DNF	12	S+2.0	(Italy) Casare Perdisa	(France) Robert Manzon	Officine Alfieri Maserati	Maserati 350S	12	Axle
DISQ	2	S+2.0	(Spain) Alfonso de Portago	(Belgium) Olivier Gendebien	Scuderia Ferrari	Ferrari 860 Monza	9	Assistance
DNF	8T	S+2.0	(Belgium) Paul Frère	(United Kingdom) Duncan Hamilton	Jaguar Cars Ltd.	Jaguar D-Type	7	Gearbox
DNF	29	S1.5	(Italy) Francesco Giardini	(Belgium) André Pilette	Officine Alfieri Maserati	Maserati 150S	7	Fuel system
DNF	3	S+2.0	(Italy) Luigi Musso	(France) Maurice Trintignant	Scuderia Ferrari	Ferrari 290 MM	4	Accident
DNF	34	S1.5	(Switzerland) Michael May	(Switzerland) Pierre May	Michael May	Porsche 550		DNF
DNF	36	S1.5	(West Germany) Karl Busch	(West Germany) Karl Schwaneberg	Karl Busch	Porsche 550		Accident
DNF	40	ser.S1.5	(West Germany) Theo Helfrich	(West Germany) Peter Nöcker	Theo Helfrich	Porsche 550		DNF
DNF	41	ser.S1.5	(West Germany) Wolfgang Seidel	(West Germany) Helm Glöcker	Wolfgang Seidel	Porsche 550		Wheel
DISQ	46	ser.S1.5	(United Kingdom) Dick Fitzwilliam	(United Kingdom) Robin Carnegie	Richard W. Fitzwilliam	MG A		Assistance
DNF	47	ser.S1.5	(United States) William Buff	(Austria) Gotfrid Köchert	William C. Buff	Porsche 550		DNF
DNF	50	GT/T+2.0	(West Germany) Fritz Riess	(West Germany) Friedrich-Victor Rolff	Fritz Riess	Mercedes-Benz 300 SL		Gearbox
DNF	52	GT/T+2.0	(West Germany) Erwin Bauer	(West Germany) Willi Heeks	Erwin Bauer	Mercedes Bens 220S		Split fuel tank
DNF	57	GT/T+2.0	(West Germany) Günther Isenbügel	(West Germany) Helmut Rathjen	Günther Isenbügel	Ford Thunderbird		Engine
DNF	62	GT/T2.0	(West Germany) Ludwig Blendl	(West Germany) Dieter Lissmann	Ludwig Blendl	Porsche 356 Carrera		Wheel
DNF	67	GT/T2.0	(Switzerland) Heini Buess	(Switzerland) Franz Hammernick	Meute	Porsche 356 Super 1500		Gearbox
DNF	70	GT/T1.3	(West Germany) Richard Trenkel	(West Germany) Helmut Niedermayr	Richard Trenkel	Porsche 356		DNF
DNF	71	GT/T1.3	(West Germany) Paul Ernst Strähle	(West Germany) Paul Denk	Erich Hofmann	Porsche 356		DNF
DNF	73	GT/T1.3	(West Germany) Josef Jeser	(West Germany) Manfred Elmenhorst	Josef Jeser	Porsche 356 1300		DNF
DNF	75	GT/T1.3	(West Germany) Alfred Kling	(West Germany) Edmund Graf	Alfred Kling	Porsche 356		Engine
DNF	80	GT/T1.3	(West Germany) Helmut Felder	(West Germany) Heinz Endermann	Helmut Felder	Alfa Romeo Giulietta Veloce		DNF
DNF	82	GT/T1.3	(Switzerland) Marcel Stern	(Switzerland) Louis Noverraz	Meute	Alfa Romeo Giulietta Veloce		Engine
DNF	84	GT/T1.3	(Italy) Alfranco Pagani	(Italy) Pietro Cagnana	Mediolanum	Alfa Romeo Giulietta Veloce		Windscreen broken
DNF	37	S1.5	(Italy) Giuseppe Musso	(United States) Walter Monaco	Isabel Haskell	Maserati 150S		Withdrawn
DNS	44	ser.S1.5	(Belgium) Christian Goethals	(Belgium) Freddy Rouselle	Ecurie Francorchamps	Porsche 550		
DNS	8	S+2.0	(Belgium) Paul Frère	(United Kingdom) Duncan Hamilton	Jaguar Cars Ltd.	Jaguar D-Type		Accident in practice

- Fastest Lap: Juan Manuel Fangio, 10:05.2secs (84.296 mph)

=== Class Winners ===
Class	Winners		
Sports +2000	6	Maserati 300S	Taruffi / Schell / Behra / Moss
Sports 1500	21	Porsche 550 RS	von Trips / Maglioli
Series Sports 1500	43	Porsche 550 Sypder	Kretschmann / Liebl
Grand Touring & Special Touring +2000	56	Mercedes-Benz 300 SL	Martenson / Einsiedel
Grand Touring & Special Touring 2000	61	Porsche 356 Carrera	Nathan / Kaiser
Grand Touring & Special Touring 1300	81	Alfa Romeo Giulietta Veloce	Bonnier / MacKay-Fraser

World Sportscar Championship
Previous race: Mille Miglia	1956 season	Next race: Swedish Grand Prix
