= 1956 1000 km Buenos Aires =

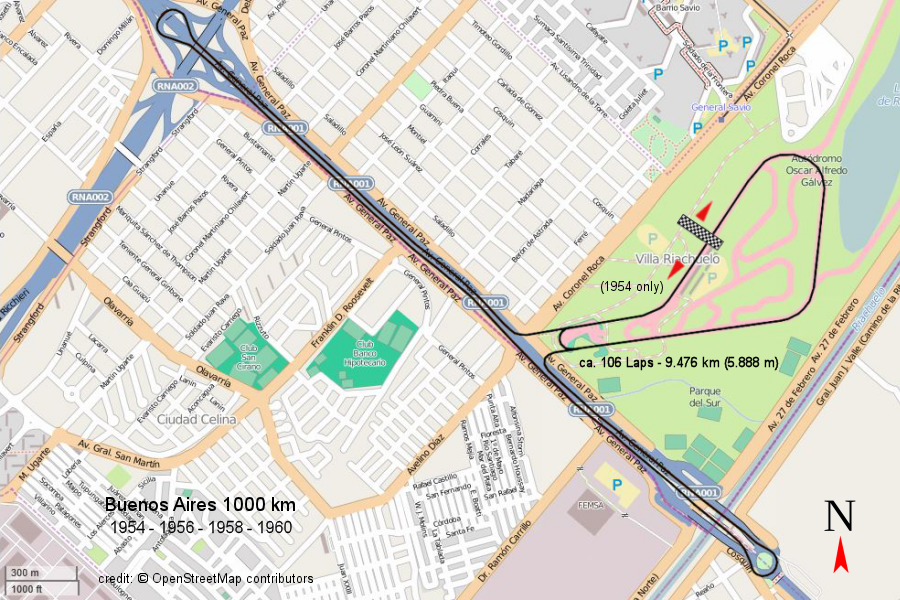
Circuit Callejero - Buenos Aires 1000km (1954)

The 1956 1000 km Buenos Aires took place on 29 January, on the Autódromo Municipal-Avenida Paz, (Buenos Aires, Argentina). It was the third running of the race, and once again, it was opening round of the F.I.A. World Sports Car Championship. For this event, a longer section of the Autopista General Pablo Riccheri route was removed, returning the circuit to 9.476 km in length, as it was in 1954.

== Report ==
=== Entry ===
A grand total of 32 racing cars were registered for this event, of which 28 arrived for practice and 27 for qualifying. Although this was the first major sports car race of the year, the race was poorly supported by the work of teams. Only Ferrari and Maserati sent cars from Europe. Both teams were represented by three cars in the race. Ferrari send a Ferrari 857 S for Olivier Gendebien and Phil Hill, and a pair of Ferrari 410 S Scaglietti Spyders for Juan Manuel Fangio/Eugenio Castellotti and Luigi Musso/Peter Collins. Meanwhile, Officine Alfieri Maserati was represented a trio of Maserati 300S in the hands of Stirling Moss/Carlos Menditéguy; Jean Behra/José Froilán González and Francisco Landi/Gerino Gerini. The remainder of the field were cars from South American teams.

=== Qualifying ===
After a three-hour qualifying session held on the prior to the race, the local hero, Juan Manuel Fangio took pole position for Scuderia Ferrari, in their Ferrari 410 S.

=== Race ===
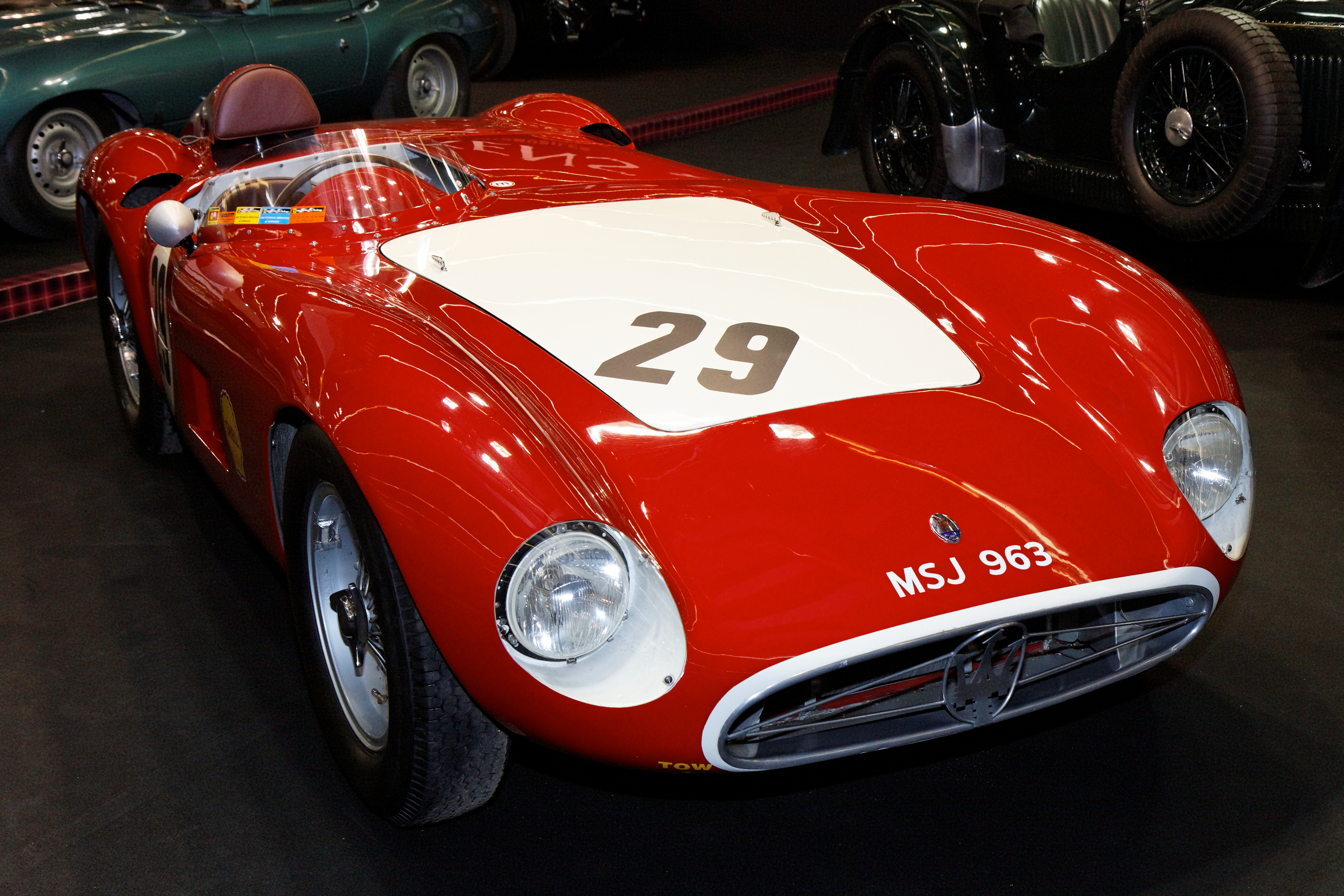
Maserati 300S - similar to the car driven to victory by Moss/Menditéguy

The race was held over 106 laps of the 5.888 miles, Autódromo Municipal-Avenida Paz, giving a distance of 624.162 miles (1,004.490 km). It was the winner of the 1955 race, Enrique Saenz Valiente who took an early lead from Fangio and Musso. By lap ten, both the works Ferrari had moved ahead of the privately entered Ferrari 375 Plus of Valinete. On lap 20, Moss and Gendebien were also moving up the leaderboard. However, with just 20 laps left Gendebien were in the pits with problems, while Fangio's car, now in the hands of Castellotti, was also in the pits following a collision with a dog. With the retirement of Musso just after half distance, the Maserati of Moss and Menditéguy was now in a clear lead. With his car now repaired, Fangio launches a relentless pursuit of the Maserati although the distance is too great and the Ferrari's differential explodes into many pieces.

As a result of Fangio's retirement, Moss and Menditéguy in car number 31, took an impressive victory, winning in a time of 6hrs 29:37.9 mins., averaging a speed of 96.116 mph. In second was the sole remaining Scuderia Ferrari of Gendebien and Hill, albeit two laps drift. The podium was complete by another works Maserati 300S, of Behra and González, who were a further three laps adrift.

== Official classification ==
Class winners are in Bold text.

Pos	No	Class	Driver		Entrant	Chassis	Laps	Reason Out
1st	**31**	**S3.0**	(United Kingdom) **Stirling Moss**	(Argentina) **Carlos Menditéguy**	**Officine Alfieri Maserati**	**Maserati 300S**	**6hr 29:37.9, 106**	
2nd	**36**	**S+3.0**	(Belgium) **Olivier Gendebien**	(United States) **Phil Hill**	**Scuderia Ferrari**	**Ferrari 857 S**	**104**	
3rd	32	S3.0	(France) Jean Behra	(Argentina) José Froilán González	Officine Alfieri Maserati	Maserati 300S	101	
4th	**4**	**S1.5**	(Argentina) **Alejandro de Tomaso**	(Argentina) **Carlo Tomasi**		**Maserati 150S**	**97**	
5th	**20**	**S2.0**	(Venezuela) **Enrique Muro**	(Venezuela) **Julio Pola**		**Ferrari 500 Mondial**	**93**	
6th	26	S3.0	(Chile) Eduardo Kovacs-Jones	(Chile) Raúl Jaras		Mercedes-Benz 300 SL	90	
DNF	43	S+3.0	(Argentina) Juan Manuel Fangio	(Italy) Eugenio Castellotti	Scuderia Ferrari	Ferrari 410 S Scaglietti Spyder	89	Transmission
7th	6	S1.5	(United States) Isabelle Haskell	(Argentina) Carlos Lostalo		Maserati 150S	88	
8th	24	S3.0	(Argentina) Angel Maiocchi	(Argentina) Lucio Bollaert		Ferrari 225 S	85	
DNF	1	S1.5	(Guatemala) Jaroslav Juhan	(Argentina) José Félix Lopes		Porsche550 Spyder	72	Accident
9th	49	S+3.0	(Argentina) Franco Bruno	(Argentina) Carlos Bruno		Allard-Cadillac J2X	71	
DISQ	3	S1.5	(West Germany) Curt Delfosse	(Argentina) Pedro Escudero		Gordini-Porsche T16 Special	70	Pushed through finish line
DNF	33	S3.0	(Brazil) Francisco Landi	(Italy) Gerino Gerini	Officine Alfieri Maserati	Maserati 300S	68	Engine
DNF	44	S+3.0	(Italy) Luigi Musso	(United Kingdom) Peter Collins	Scuderia Ferrari	Ferrari 410 S Scaglietti Spyder	61	Differential
DNF	42	S+3.0	(Argentina) Roberto Bonomi	(Argentina) Ernesto Florencio Castro Cranwell		Ferrari 375 MM	59	Fire
DNF	34	S3.0	(Argentina) Luis Milan	(Argentina) Ela Capotosti		Ferrari 625 TF	44	Clutch
DNF	41	S+3.0	(Brazil) Celso Lara-Barberis	(Brazil) Godofredo Vianna		Ferrari 375	41	Engine
DNF	30	S3.0	(Venezuela) Lino Fayen	(Venezuela) Joao Rozendo Dos Santos	Scuderia Guastalla	Ferrari 750 Monza Spyder Scaglietti	37	Raer axle
DNF	45	S+3.0	(Argentina) Enrique Saenz Valiente	(Argentina) Jorge Camano		Ferrari 375 Plus	35	Overheating
DNF	22	S2.0	(Italy) Maria Teresa de Filippis			Maserati A6GCS	26	Accident
DNF	46	S+3.0	(Argentina) Carlos Najurieta	(Argentina) Cesar Rivero		Ferrari 375 MM	23	Gearbox
DNF	5	S1.5	(Argentina) Miguel Jantus	(Argentina) Alberto Gomez		Gordini T15S	22	Engine
DNF	23	S2.0	(Argentina) Ricardo Grandio	(Argentina) Alberto Rodríguez Larreta		Maserati A6GCS	21	
DNF	25	S3.0	(Argentina) Danilo Clapesssoni	(Argentina) César Reyes		Ferrari 225 S	16	Engine
DNF	2	S1.5	(Argentina) Tomas Mayol	(Argentina) Juan Gobbi		Porsche 550 Spyder	14	Engine
DNF	21	S3.0	(Uruguay) Osvaldo Carballido	(Uruguay) Elias Carballido		Austin-Healey 100M	11	Fire
DNF	35	S+3.0	(Argentina) José M. Millet	(Argentina) Miguel Schroeder		Jaguar C-Type	3	
DNS	40	S+3.0	(France) Jean Blanc (Argentina) Pedro J. Llano	(France) Colette Duval		Talbot-Lago T26GS		

- Fastest Lap: Peter Collins, 3:26.4secs (102.7034 mph)

=== Class winners ===
Class	Winners		
Sports +3000	36	Ferrari 857 S	Gendebien / Hill
Sports 3000	31	Maserati 300S	Moss / Menditéguy
Sports 2000	20	Ferrari 500 Mondial	Muro / Pola
Sports 1500	4	Maserati 150S	de Tomaso / Tomasi

== Standings after the race ==
Pos	Championship	Points
1	(Italy) Maserati	8
2	(Italy) Ferrari	6
3	(West Germany) Mercedes-Benz	1

- Note: Only the top five positions are included in this set of standings.

Championship points were awarded for the first six places in each race in the order of 8-6-4-3-2-1. Manufacturers were only awarded points for their highest finishing car with no points awarded for positions filled by additional cars. Only the best 3 results out of the 5 races could be retained by each manufacturer. Points earned but not counted towards the championship totals are listed within brackets in the above table.

World Sportscar Championship
Previous race: 1955 Targa Florio	1956 season	Next race: 12 Hours of Sebring
