= Louis Klemantaski =

British photographer (1912–2001)

- Born: 12 February 1912; Harbin, China
- Died: 26 June 2001 (aged 89)
- Occupation: Motor sports photographer
- Years active: 1936 to 1974

Louis Klemantaski was a British photographer and was said to have invented the art of motor racing photography.

== Early life ==
Klemantaski was born in what was then Manchuria on 12 February 1912, to a Russian mother and Dutch-born British father of Polish heritage who imported Willys-Overland vehicles into the country.

Klemantaski's love of photography started when he received a camera for his 10th birthday, shortly before the family moved back to Britain for his secondary education and to escape the plague which was spreading in Harbin.

Klemantaski graduated from King's College in London, however his love of photography and cars combined when he started racing single seater sports cars around nearby racing circuits such as Brooklands. He befriended many drivers, and after retiring from racing following a motorcycle crash in 1933, began taking action shots and selling the resulting photos to the drivers.

== Career ==
During the war, Klemantaski joined the Department of Miscellaneous Weapons Development where he photographed new weapons being deployed as part of their assessment. Most famously, he photographed Barnes Wallis' Bouncing Bombs to record their size, trajectory and speed.

Whilst he photographed and published books on several marques, Klemantaski is most closely associated with Aston Martin. He was asked to take pictures of the new Lagonda in 1947, and when David Brown bought that company the same year to merge with Aston Martin, Klemantaski came too. He then did most of the advertising photography for the next 10 years and more, and followed the racing team during a golden period which peaked with the triumph at Le Mans in 1959 and victory in the world sportscar championship.

As well as being beside the circuit during races such as Le Mans and the Spa 24, Klemantaski also sat in the passenger seat during 3 Monte Carlo rallies and 5 Mille Miglias, documenting the exploits of those in the driving seat. These included acting as navigator/photographer for his great friends Reg Parnell (1954 Mille Miglia in an Aston DB3S), Paul Frere (1955 Mille Miglia in an Aston DB2) and Peter Collins (1956 Mille Miglia in a Ferrari 860 Monza).

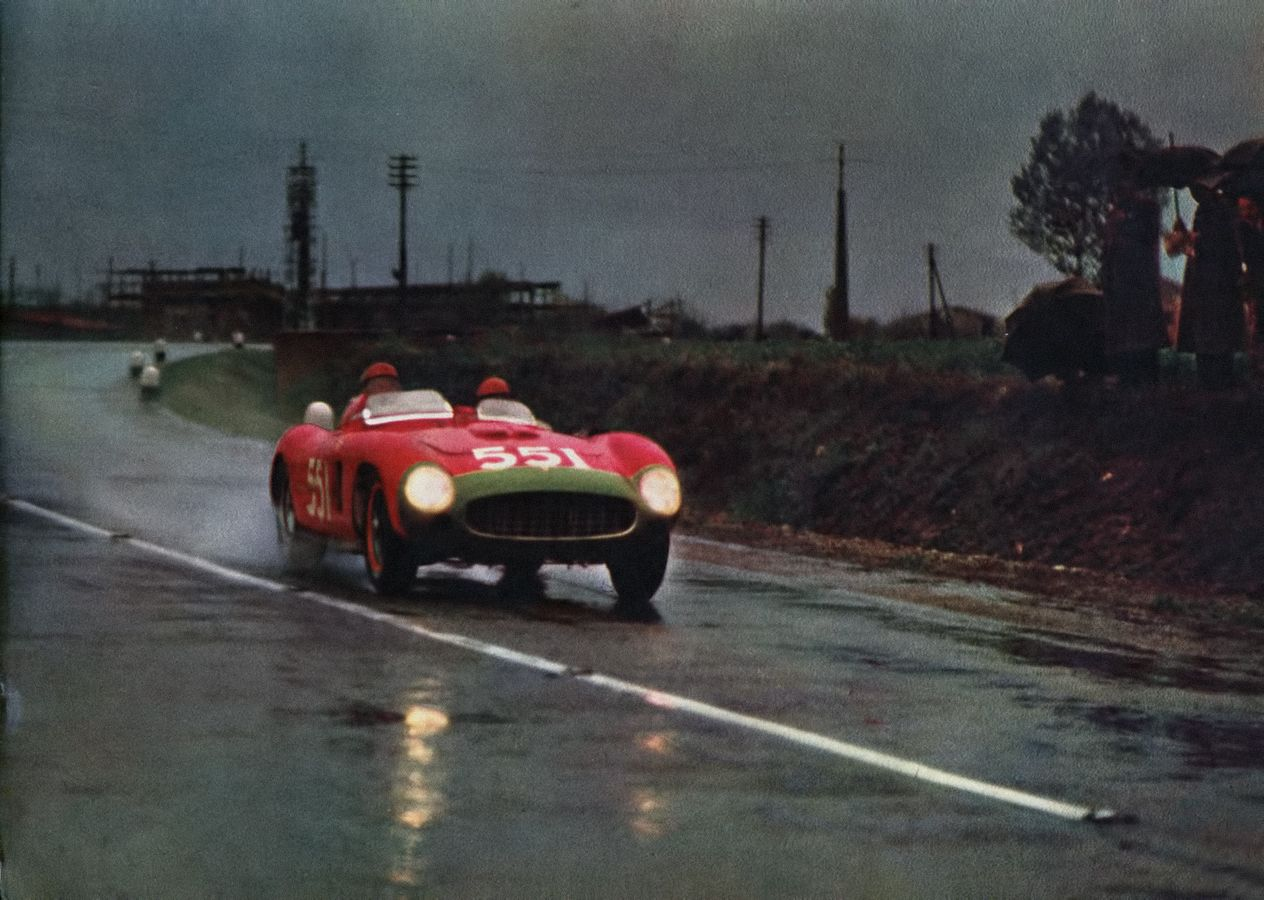
Peter Collins and Louis Klemantaski in a Ferrari 860 Monza at the Mille Miglia, 29 April 1956

In one of his most famous photos, Klemantaski was there to capture the moment that Carroll Shelby crossed the line to take the 1959 Le Mans victory in an Aston DBR1/300.

With Aston Martin achieving their ambition, they decided to quit sportscar racing, and Klemantaski decided this was his moment to retire from working with Aston Martin, frustrated by new safety regulations which forced him further from the action and saddened by the death of his friend Peter Collins. He then devoted his time to portrait photography, though he continued to attend and photograph at sportscar events until his permanent retirement in 1974.

Klemantaski published many collections of his photographs during his life, including limited editions such as 'Klemantaski & Aston Martin' with Chris Nixon in 1998, the last one before his death aged 89 in 2001.

In 1989, Klemantaski sold his entire library to Peter Sachs, who established the Klemantaski collection, combining Louis' work with a dozen other car photographers in an archive which lists in excess of 50,000 motor sport images.
