= 1956 Mille Miglia =

Auto race held in Italy

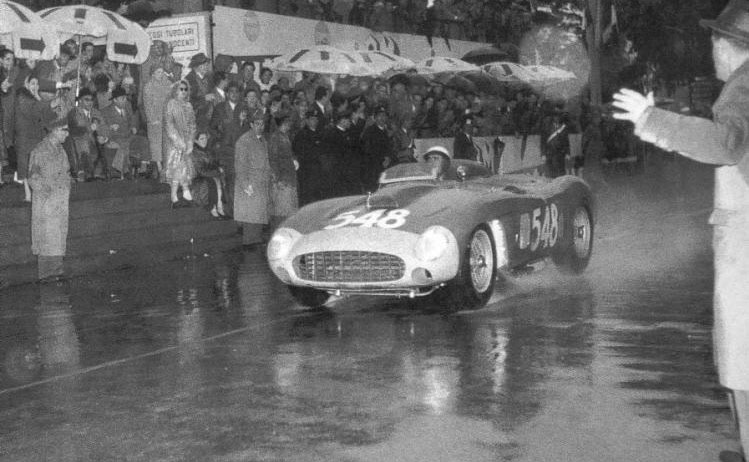
Eugenio Castellotti wins the race in a Ferrari 290 MM.

The 23. edizione Mille Miglia was an auto race held on a 992.332 mile (1597 km) course made up entirely of public roads around Italy, mostly on the outer parts of the country on 28–29 April 1956. The route was based on a round trip between Brescia and Rome, with start/finish, in Brescia. It was the 3rd round of the 1956 World Sportscar Championship.

As in previous years, this event was not strictly a race against each other, but a race against the clock. The cars were released at one-minute intervals, usually with the larger professional class cars going before the slower cars; in the Mille Miglia, however, the smaller displacement slower cars started first. Each car number related to the car’s allocated start time. For example, Peter Collins's car had the number 551, which meant he left Brescia at 5:51am, although the first cars had started late in the evening on the previous day. Some drivers went with navigators, others didn't; a number of local Italian drivers had knowledge of the routes being used and felt confident enough that they wouldn't need one.

This race was won by Scuderia Ferrari driver Eugenio Castellotti without the aid of a navigator. He completed the 992-mile distance in 11 hours, 37 minutes and 10 seconds- an average speed of 85.403 mph (137.442 km/h). The Italian finished 12 minutes in front of his second-placed team-mates, the English pairing of Collins and Louis Klemantaski. Luigi Musso and Juan Manuel Fangio were next, ensuring Ferrari finished 1-2-3-4.

== Report ==
=== Entry ===
A total of 426 cars were entered for the event, across 13 classes including Grand Touring Cars, Touring Cars and Sports Cars with engine sizes ranging from up to 750cc to over 2.0-litres. Of the cars entered, 365 cars started the event.

Following the withdrawal of both Daimler Benz AG and Lancia from motor sport at the end of 1955, the World Sportscar Championship was left wide open for Ferrari to regain the title they had held in 1953 and 1954, although Maserati also aimed to win the title. Each team had one win apiece from the first two races, but Ferrari had the upper hand as they led the championship by four points.

For the 1956 Mille Miglia, the only racing factory teams were Ferrari and Maserati. Scuderia Ferrari brought five cars: two 290 MMs for Castellotti and Fangio, two 860 Monzas for Collins and Musso, with a 250 GT SWB for Olivier Gendebien. The other works team was Maserati, who entered three cars driven by Stirling Moss (350S), Piero Taruffi and Cesare Perdisa, both in 300S. Meanwhile, there was a significant contingent of Mercedes-Benz cars – no less than 14 semi-works Mercedes-Benz 300SL. With the numbers of participants being reduced by the organisers, many international racing teams and their drivers stayed away from the race.

== Race ==
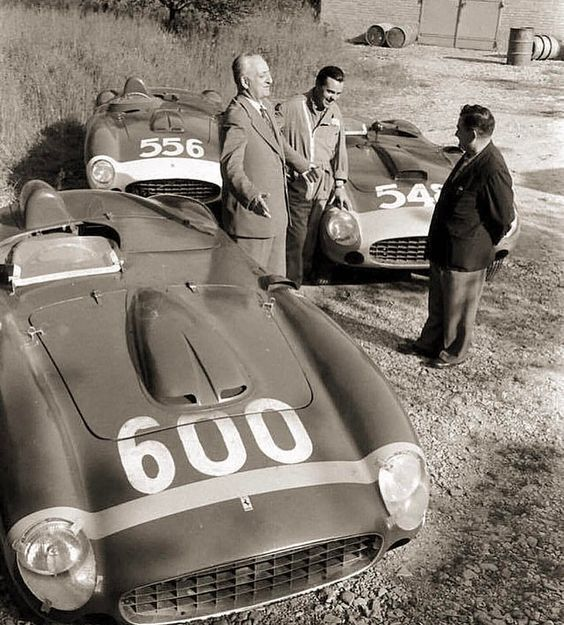
Enzo Ferrari before or after the race with three of his participating Ferraris (0602M, 0606 and this years winner 0616)

Ferrari's race plan was, in the first half of the race, Castellotti and Fangio would push hard in their faster cars, with Collins and Musso saving their strength for the return leg, arriving fresh in Rome, then able to attack over the rough and winding mountain passes of Radicofani, Futa and Raticosa. Despite this plan, the Maserati of Taruffi took the lead between Ravenna and Forlì, but problems with wet brakes forced him to stop at Savignano sul Rubicone. The Mercedes of Wolfgang von Trips took over the lead, ahead of Castellotti and the Mercedes of Fritz Reiss. The early race sensation were the two Osca drivers Giulio Cabianca and Umberto Maglioli who were lying in fifth and seventh places in their little 1.2 litre 4-cylinder cars. But von Trips left the road in Pescara, while Moss did the same in Antrodoco. By Rome, Reiss would be the only threat to Ferrari, but he too was forced to slow down, eventually finishing tenth overall. Castellotti went on to win the event. In the fast mountain passes down to Pescara, the Osca drivers could not keep up the pace and soon fell back in the standings.

However, the event was marred by many severe accidents, resulting in 6 deaths and 14 people injured, largely due to heavy rain throughout Italy in the early hours of the race. These accidents happened in spite of the attempt by the organisers to make the event safer. The fatal accidents included one that resulted in the death of the Englishman John Heath. He came off the wet road before Ravenna and overturned into a ditch. He died the next day from his injuries in a local hospital. Another fatality occurred in the small town of Montemarciano on the Adriatic coast, 260 miles (416 km) into the race, when the Mercedes-Benz 300 SL driven by the German pairing of Helmut Busch and Wolfgang Piwco left the road. At the time of the accident, Piwco was driving the car. The car hit a wall, killing him instantly, while Busch suffered only minor injuries. One spectator was also injured. A third accident claimed the life of Swiss driver Max Berney, who was killed just outside Ravenna after his Alfa rolled after having hit a house in pouring rain at four o' clock in the morning. His co-driver Ivo Badaracco was seriously injured, but he survived. In addition to these 3 competitors, 3 spectators were also killed. An Alfa Romeo 1900 driven by Aldo Giacobi went off the road barely 20 miles into the race and 2 spectators, Egidio Pincella and Igino Leoncelli, were hit and killed by the impact. The car then crossed the road, hit a parked vehicle and injured five other spectators. Later on in Pescara, 400 miles (640 km) into the race, a Stanguellini 750 Sport driven by Giorgio Cecchini hit and killed a spectator named Guerrino Sciarra.

When Castellotti arrived back in Brescia, he had more than a ten-minute advantage over Collins. Musso was in third place, Fangio in fourth and Gendebien in fifth, completing a top-five clean sweep for Ferrari. Maserati experienced a debacle, with only Jean Behra making it back to Brescia. He had had to make several repairs on the way and finished 20th overall. Behind the Ferraris, were the three Mercedes of Paul von Metternich, Wolfgang Seidel and Jacques Pollet, in sixth, seventh and eighth places, respectively. Cabianca would eventually finish in ninth place after a spirited drive. Reiss, who was plagued by engine problems late in the race, arrived in tenth place. Castellotti reached Brescia at 17:25, 11 hours and 37 minutes after leaving Brescia at 05:48. He completed the race at an average speed of 85.403 mph.

== Classification ==
=== Official Results ===
Of the 365 starters, 182 were classified as finishers. Therefore, only a selection of notable racers has been listed below.

Class Winners are in Bold text.

Pos.	No.	Class	Driver		Entrant	Car - Engine	Time	Reason Out
1st	**548**	**S+2.0**	**(Italy) Eugenio Castellotti**		**Scuderia Ferrari**	**Ferrari 290 MM Scaglietti**	**11hr 37:10**	
2nd	551	S+2.0	(United Kingdom) Peter Collins	(United Kingdom) Louis Klemantaski	Scuderia Ferrari	Ferrari 860 Monza Scaglietti	11hr 49:28	
3rd	556	S+2.0	(Italy) Luigi Musso		Scuderia Ferrari	Ferrari 860 Monza Scaglietti	12hr 11:49	
4th	600	S+2.0	(Argentina) Juan Manuel Fangio		Scuderia Ferrari	Ferrari 290 MM	12hr 26:50	
5th	**505**	**T/GT+2.0**	**(Belgium) Olivier Gendebien**	**(Belgium) Jacques Washer**		**Ferrari 250 GT LWB Scaglietti**	**12hr 29:58**	
6th	504	T/GT+2.0	(West Germany) Paul von Metternich	(West Germany) Wittigo von Einsiedel		Mercedes-Benz 300 SL	12hr 36.38	
7th	454	T/GT+2.0	(West Germany) Wolfgang Seidel	(West Germany) Helmut Glöckler		Mercedes-Benz 300 SL	12hr 38:24	
8th	450	T/GT+2.0	(France) Jacques Pollet	(France) P. Flandrak		Mercedes-Benz 300 SL	12hr 49:58	
9th	**428**	**S1.5**	**(Italy) Giulio Cabianca**			**Osca MT4**	**12hr 57:11**	
10th	443	T/GT+2.0	(West Germany) Fritz Riess	(West Germany) Hermann Eger		Mercedes-Benz 300 SL	13hr 06:31	
11th	**106**	**T/GT1.3**	**(Italy) Roberto Sgorbati**	**(Italy) Luigi Zanelli**		**Alfa Romeo Giulietta SV**	**13hr 06:42**	
12th	120	T/GT1.3	(Italy) Giorgio Becucci	(Italy) Pasquale Cazzato		Alfa Romeo Giulietta SV	13hr 12:41	
13th	**529**	**S2.0**	**(Italy) Giorgio Scarlatti**			**Maserati A6GCS**	**13hr 19:02**	
14th	**326**	**T/GT2.0**	**(Italy) Casimiro Toselli**	**(Italy) Renato Canaparo**		**Fiat 8V**	**13hr 19:02**	
15th	050	T/GT1.3	(Sweden) Jo Bonnier	(Sweden) Bo Beesen		Alfa Romeo Giulietta SV	13hr 20:58	
16th	455	T/GT+2.0	(Italy) Arnaldo Bongiasca	(Italy) Mario Bongiasca		Mercedes-Benz 300SL	13hr 26:05	
17th	507	T/GT+2.0	(Italy) Luciano Mantovani	(Italy) Nereo Cantuseno		Lancia Aurelia	12hr 26:23	
18th	**255**	**T/GT1.6**	**(Sweden) Olof Persson**	**(Sweden) Gunnar Blomqvist**		**Porsche 356 Carrera**	**13hr 32:64**	
19th	323	T/GT2.0	(Italy) Maggiorello Maggiorelli	(Italy) Adalberto Parenti		Fiat 8V	12hr 56:11	
20th	433	S1.5	(France) Jean Behra		Officine Alfieri Maserati	Maserati 150S	13hr 34:09	
21st	314	T/GT2.0	(Italy) Nello Sassoli	(Italy) Aurelio Schoen		Fiat 8V Zagato	13hr 38:12	
22nd	248	T/GT1.6	(West Germany) Max Nathan	(Sweden) Gert Kaiser		Porsche 356 1500 Carrera	13hr 40:07	
23rd	037	T/GT1.3	(West Germany) Paul-Ernst Straehle	(West Germany) Sepp Greger		Porsche 356A 1300 Super	13hr 40:29	
24th	448	T/GT+2.0	(Italy) Giuliano Giovanardi	(Italy) Giorgio Meier		Ferrari 250 GT LWB Scaglietti	13hr 40:35	
25th	509	T/GT+2.0	(West Germany) Erwin Bauer	(West Germany) Eugen Grupp		Mercedes-Benz 220A	13hr 42:20	
26th	310	T/GT2.0	(Italy) Marino Guarnieri	(Italy) Danilo Brancalion		Fiat 8V Zagato	13hr 44:57	
27th	338	T/GT2.0	(Italy) Daniele Pistoia			Alfa Romeo 1900	13hr 45:49	
28th	547	S+2.0	(Italy) Cesare Perdisa			Maserati 300S	13hr 47:17	
29th	118	T/GT1.3	(Switzerland) Marcel Stern	(Switzerland) Robert Barbey		Alfa Romeo Giulietta SV	13hr 47:19	
30th	346	T/GT2.0	(Italy) Bruno Mazzi	(Italy) Emanuele de Amicis		Alfa Romeo 1900	13hr 48:22	
40th	**245**	**SP**	**(France) Georges Guyot**			**Jaguar XK140**	**14hr 07:15**	
49th	451	T/GT+2.0	(Switzerland) Arthur Heuberger	(Switzerland) W. Heuberger		BMW 507	14hr 21:50	
50th	107	T/GT1.3	(Italy) Carlo Guidetti	(Italy) Montano Lampugnani		Siata 1250GT	14hr 22:04	
54th	**7**	**T/GT750**	**(France) Maurice Michy**			**Alpine-Renault A106MM**	**14hr 34:55**	
55th	**76**	**T/GT1.0**	**(France) Robert Manzon**	**(France) L. Borsa**		**D.B.-Panhard HBR**	**14hr 36:54**	
56th	518	S2.0	(Italy) Francesco Giardini			Maserati A6GCS	14hr 38:42	
57th	**2348**	**T/GT1.1**	**(Italy) Ludovico Scarfiotti**			**Fiat 1100/103 TV**	**14hr 39:15**	
62nd	**404**	**S1.1**	**(Italy) Attilio Brandi**			**Osca MT4 1100**	**14hr 48:42**	
70th	229	SP	(United Kingdom) Peter Scott-Russell	(United Kingdom) Tom Haig		MG A	15hr 02:15	
72nd	254	T/GT1.6	(United Kingdom) Sheila van Damm	(United Kingdom) Peter Harper		Sunbeam Rapier	15hr 04:37	
77th	247	SP	(United Kingdom) Tommy Wisdom	(United States) Walter E. Monaco		Austin-Healey 100M	15hr 09:08	
82nd	75	T/GT1.0	(Belgium) Gilberte Thirion			Renault Dauphine	15hr 14:10	
105th	61	T/GT1.0	(France) Maurice Trintignant	(France) A. Drouot		Renault Dauphine	15hr 39:53	
106th	**210**	**S750**	**(Italy) Ovidio Capelli**			**Osca S750**	**15hr 41:15**	
107th	73	T/GT1.0	(France) Louis Rosier			Renault Dauphine	15hr 41:24	
110th	62	T/GT1.0	(Belgium) Paul Frère			Renault Dauphine	15hr 41:24	
130th	155	S750	(France) René Philippe Faure		Roger Faure	Stanguellini 750 Sport	16hr 17:04	
137th	219	S750	(Italy) Roberto Lippi		Alberta Ralli	Stanguellini 750 Sport	16hr 31:32	
151st	301	T/GT1.6	(United Kingdom) Gregor Grant			MG Magnette	16hr 57:56	
182nd	2341	T/GT1.1	(Italy) Pasquale Cardinali	(Italy) Vittorio Baldini		Fiat 1100	21hr 38:18	
DNF	424	S1.5	(Italy) Umberto Maglioli			Osca MT4 1500	6hr 15:18	DNF
DNF	436	S1.5	(Italy) Luigi Villoresi			Osca MT4 1500	6hr 34:42	DNF
DNF	419	S1.5	(West Germany) Hans Herrmann	(West Germany) Werner Enz		Porsche 550 RS	9hr 55:20	DNF
DNF	68	T/GT1.0	(France) Jean Rédélé	(France) Louis Pons		Renault Dauphine		DNF
DNF	112	T/GT1.3	(Switzerland) Ivo Badaracco	(Switzerland) Max Berney		Alfa Romeo Giulietta SV		Fatal accident (Berney)
DNF	200	S750	(France) Élie Bayol			D.B.-Panhard HBR		DNF
DNF	215	S750	(France) Louis Chiron			Osca S750		Clutch
DNF	234	SP	(United Kingdom) Bruno Ferrari	(Italy) Franco Dari	Bruno Ferrari	AC Ace		Accident
DNF	242	SP	(United Kingdom) Leslie Brooke	(United Kingdom) Stan Asbury		Austin-Healey 100M		Accident
DNF	358	S1.1	(Italy) ”Nando”			Osca MT4 1100		DNF
DNF	425	S1.5	(Italy) Consalvo Sanesi			Alfa Romeo Giulietta Spyder		DNF
DNF	434	S1.5	(Argentina) Alejandro de Tomaso			Maserati 150S		DNF
DNF	446	T/GT+2.0	(West Germany) Wolfgang von Trips	(West Germany) Horst Straub		Mercedes-Benz 300 SL		Accident
DNF	502	T/GT+2.0	(West Germany) Helmut Busch	(West Germany) Wolfgang Piwco		Mercedes-Benz 300 SL		Fatal accident (Piwco)
DNF	545	S+2.0	(United Kingdom) John Heath		H. W. Motors	HWM-Jaguar		Fatal accident
DNF	553	S+2.0	(Italy) Piero Taruffi		Officine Alfieri Maserati	Maserati 300S Fantuzzi		Accident
DNF	554	S+2.0	(United Kingdom) Stirling Moss	(United Kingdom) Denis Jenkinson	Officine Alfieri Maserati	Maserati 350S Fantuzzi		Accident
DNF	557	S+2.0	(Italy) Gerino Gerini			Maserati 300S Scaglietti		DNF
DNF	453	T/GT+2.0	(Italy) Camillo Luglio	(Italy) Elfo Frignani		Ferrari 250 GT Boano Competizione		DNF

=== Class Winners ===
Class	No.	Car	Driver/s
Sport oltre 2000	548	Ferrari 290 MM Scaglietti	Castellotti
Sports 2000	529	Maserati A6GCS	Scarlatti
Sports 1500	428	Osca MT4 1500	Cabianca
Sports 1100	404	Osca MT4 1100	Brandi
Sports 750	210	Osca S750	Capelli
Speciale vetture sport aperte com limite di prezzo	245	Jaguar XK140	Guyot
Vetture serie special da turismo e grad turismo di serie oltre 2000	505	Ferrari 250 GT LWB Scaglietti	Genedebien / Washer
Vetture serie special da turismo e grad turismo di serie 2000	326	Fiat 8V	Toselli / Canaparo
Vetture serie special da turismo e grad turismo di serie 1600	255	Porsche 356 Carrera	Persson / Blomqvist
Vetture serie special da turismo e grad turismo di serie 1300	106	Alfa Romeo Giulietta SV	Sgorbati / Zanelli
Vetture serie special da turismo e grad turismo di serie 1100	2348	Fiat 1100/103 TV	Scarfiotti
Vetture serie special da turismo e grad turismo di serie 1000	76	D.B.-Panhard HBR	Manzon / Borsa
Vetture serie special da turismo e grad turismo di serie 750	7	Alpine-Renault A106 MM	Michy

== Standings after the race ==
Pos	Make	Points
1	(Italy) Ferrari	22
2	(Italy) Maserati	10
3	(United Kingdom) Jaguar	4
4	(United Kingdom) Aston Martin	3
5	(West Germany) Porsche	1

- Note: Only the top five positions are included in this set of standings.

Points towards the 1956 World Sportscar Championship were awarded for the first six places in each race in the order of 8-6-4-3-2-1. Manufacturers were only awarded points for their highest finishing car with no points awarded for positions filled by additional cars. Only the best 3 results out of the 5 races could be retained by each manufacturer. Points earned but not counted towards the championship totals are listed within brackets in the above table.

World Sportscar Championship
Previous race: 12 Hours of Sebring	1956 season	Next race: 1000km of Nürburgring
