= 1956 World Sportscar Championship =

Racing tournament

Seasons
- ← 1955 1957 →

The 1956 World Sportscar Championship was the fourth annual FIA World Sportscar Championship. It was a contested by sportscars over a series of five races from 29 January to 12 August 1956. The 1956 24 Hours of Le Mans was not included due to an engine size limit imposed by the local organizers for safety reasons, and the Targa Florio did not return due to a dispute over race distance.

1955 champions Mercedes-Benz in motorsport, having won all three World championships it had competed for, F1 in 1954 & '55 and Sportscars in '55, plus winning with the original 300 SL in 1952 before the World Sportscar Championship existed, officially withdrew from motorsports again and thus did not defend their title. The major accident at the 1955 24 Hours of Le Mans that killed 80 spectators confirmed the earlier decision. Some privately entered 300 SL Gullwing scored points anyway.

This led to the fewest factory-backed competitors for many years, with only Maserati being a serious challenger, winning two rounds. After winning the first two seasons in 1953 and 1954, the championship was once again won by Ferrari, with three wins, backed up with two second places.

== Championship summary ==
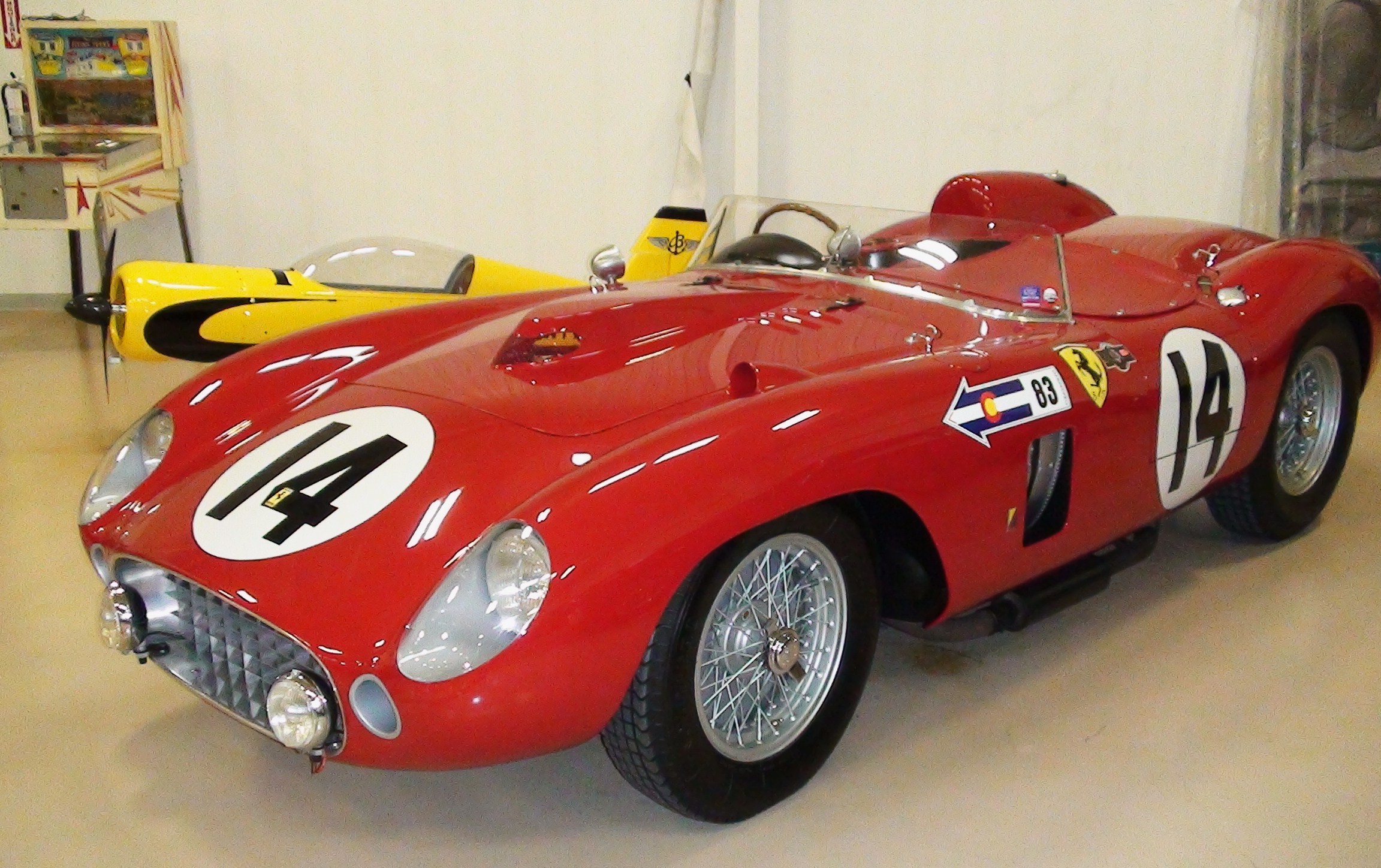
Ferrari won the championship with the 860 Monza and 290 MM (pictured)

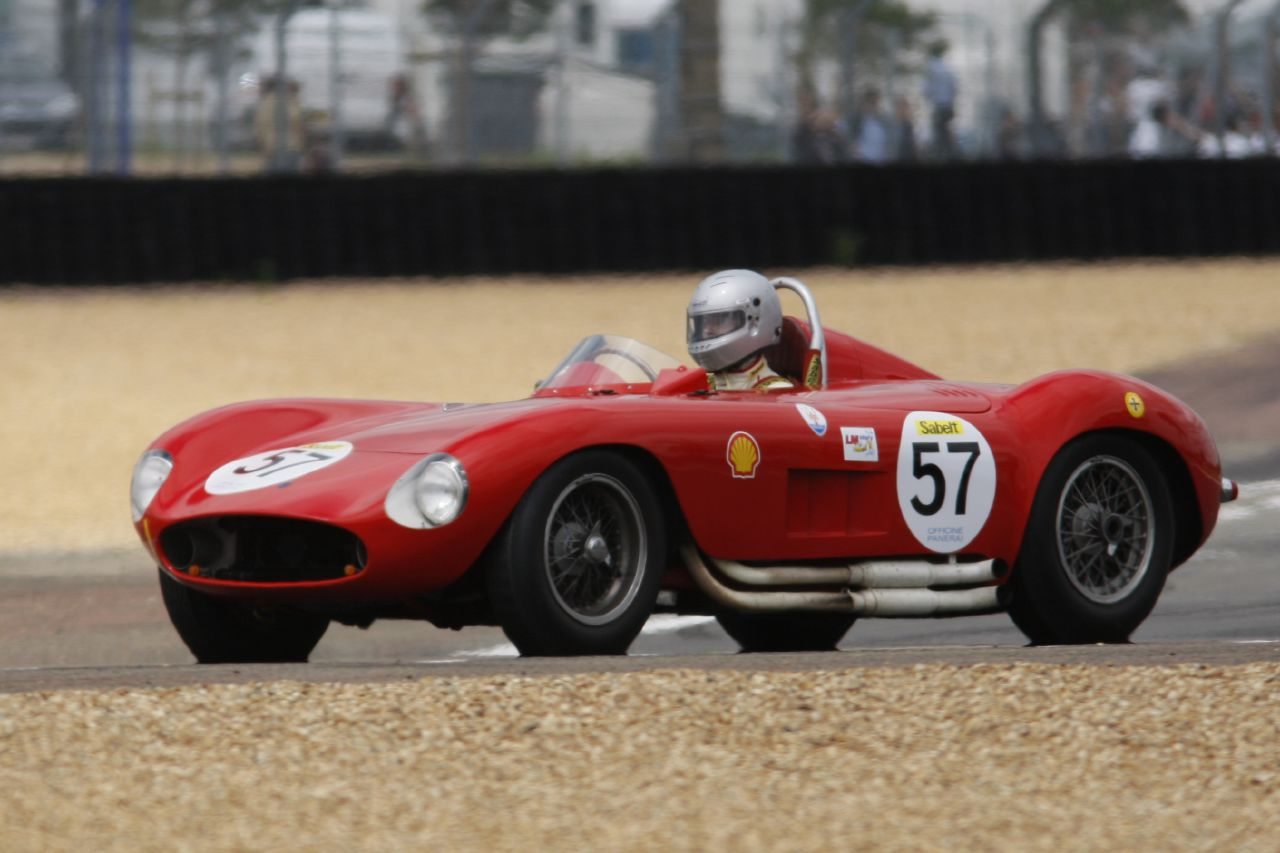
Maserati placed second with the Maserati 300S (pictured)

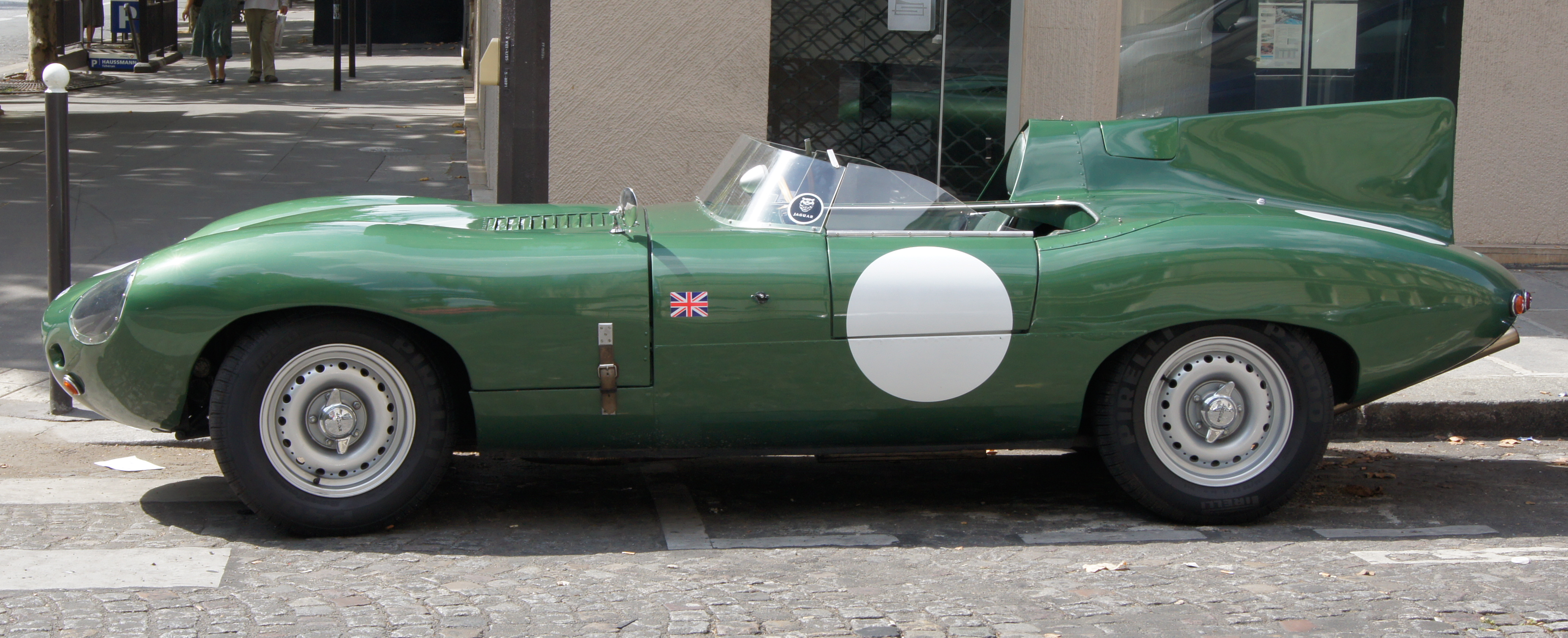
Jaguar placed third with the D-Type

The 1956 World Sports Car Championship was ultimately contested over only five races, again starting with the early overseas events of Buenos Aires and Sebring. European rounds started with the Mille Miglia in late April.

The German Nürburgring, the worlds longest purpose-built race track, finally returned with the 27 May 1956 1000 km Nürburgring race that first was held in August of 1953 with poor attendance after Mercedes discontinued the 300 SL that had been successful in 1952. In 1954, Mercedes was focussed on F1 only, and the 1000km did not take place. In 1955 the 1000km had been scheduled again for late August, weeks after the German Grand Prix, but both were among the events affected by the Le Mans disaster. For 1956 the ADAC switched dates with its Eifelrennen and moved the 1000km to May, more than two months before the 1956 German Grand Prix.

While much of the controversy surrounding the tragedy at Le Mans had subsided by January 1956, those in the international racing community were still contending with the fallout. The A.C.O., organiser of the 1956 24 Hours of Le Mans postponed its race to late July and introduced regulations reducing the maximum engine capacity for prototype cars to only 2.5 litres. This caused Le Mans to lose 1956 championship status, but it would return to the championship in 1957.

As the Mille Miglia had been chosen to represent Italy, the Targa Florio had not been an championship event, but with the 1954 Carrera Panamericana being the last, at slot in the 1955 calendar opened, late in the year, which was no problem for the island of Sicily. There was a dispute over distance, though. The 1954 Targa had been run for 8 laps, 576km and over 6 hours. To be added to the 1955 championship, the CSI demanded the usual minimum 1000km distance, which would have been over 10 hours for 14 laps of 72 km of slow mountain roads. Eventually the 1955 Targa Florio was run in October 1955 for 13 laps and 9:43 hours. Due to the 1955 fatal crashes, also at Dundrod, safety concerns rose. For the Targa on 10 June 1956, the CSI asked for a return to 8 laps, but 73 year old Vincenzo Florio insisted on his 10 laps compromise proposal, and the permission to let single drivers run the whole race, which was already unusual at the time. Championship status was not granted for 1956.

The organisers of both the British RAC Tourist Trophy and the Mexican Carrera Panamericana had been given late season championship calendar slots, but neither event was run amid safety concerns. The RAC Tourist Trophy would never return to the Dundrod Circuit after the 1955 RAC TT fatalities, and the Carrera Panamericana would never return.

Since championship regulations required at least five qualifying events actually be held, and with only four rounds secured after four others had dropped out, the Swedish Grand Prix was upgraded to championship status in recognition of the successful 1955 race that saw a Mercedes 300 SLR 1-2 win.

The championship remained as a contest for manufacturers, with the factory teams of Scuderia Ferrari, Maserati, Aston Martin and Jaguar leading the way. As in previous seasons, the majority of the fields were made up of amateur or gentlemen drivers, often racing against professional racing drivers with experience in Formula One.

For Ferrari's assault on the 1956 championship, they settled on using virtually identical chassis with either four or twelve-cylinder engines of nearly 3.5 liter capacity. Both car types shared exactly the same chassis and similarly styling. Carrozzeria Scaglietti built the aluminum bodies for both. The more successful of the two was the V12-engined 290 MM, which was driven to a debut victory in the Mille Miglia by Eugenio Castellotti which earned the car the MM. In the season finale, Phil Hill and Maurice Trintignant added a second win to the 290 MM's tally in only its third major race. The less powerful sister 860 Monza had an equally impressive first outing, with a one-two victory in the Florida International Grand Prix of Endurance. During the remainder of the season, the big fours supported Ferrari's chase for the championship with valuable podium finishes. With three very convincing wins in the five rounds, backed up by second places, Ferrari were crowned World Champions at the end of the season. For the third time in four seasons, the title had gone to Maranello.

Ferrari's chief rivals Maserati hired Stirling Moss for the season, and prepared a works team for all the rounds of the championship. At the opening round, the 1000 km Buenos Aires, the factory efforts paid off, when all the large 4.0-litre Ferraris suffered mechanical problems, and Moss and local hero, Carlos Menditéguy took overall victory, in a 300S. For the next rounds at Sebring and the Mille Miglia, Maserati prepared the 350S. The cars were on pace but succumbed to the competition. The Internationales ADAC 1000 Kilometer Rennen auf dem Nürburgring changed this when Moss and Jean Behra took over a second car and drove it to victory. The championship ended at the Sveriges Grand Prix and Maserati had high hopes to gain enough points to win over Ferrari. Despite bringing five cars, all the Maseratis retired, leaving Ferrari to take all the top five places and the championship.

== Race schedule ==
Round	Date	Event	Circuit or Location	Winning driver	Winning team	Winning car	Results
1	January 29	(Argentina) 1000km of Buenos Aires	Autódromo Municipal-Avenida Paz	(United Kingdom) Stirling Moss (Argentina) Carlos Menditéguy	(Italy) Officine Alfieri Maserati	(Italy) Maserati 300S	Results
2	March 24	(United States) Florida International Grand Prix of Endurance	Sebring International Raceway	(Argentina) Juan Manuel Fangio (Italy) Eugenio Castellotti	(Italy) Scuderia Ferrari	(Italy) Ferrari 860 Monza	Results
3	April 29	(Italy) Mille Miglia	Brescia-Rome-Brescia	(Italy) Eugenio Castellotti	(Italy) Scuderia Ferrari	(Italy) Ferrari 290 MM	Results
4	May 27	(West Germany) Internationales ADAC 1000 Kilometer Rennen auf dem Nürburgring	Nürburgring	(Italy) Piero Taruffi (United States) Harry Schell (France) Jean Behra (United Kingdom) Stirling Moss	(Italy) Officine Alfieri Maserati	(Italy) Maserati 300S	Results
5	August 12	(Sweden) Sveriges Grand Prix	Råbelövsbanan	(United States) Phil Hill (France) Maurice Trintignant	(Italy) Scuderia Ferrari	(Italy) Ferrari 290 MM	Results

== Points system ==
Championship points were awarded for the first six places in each race in the order of 8-6-4-3-2-1. The best result per marque at each race counted. Only the best 3 results out of the 5 races could be retained.

== Championship standings ==
Pos.	Make	(Argentina) BUE	(United States) SEB	(Italy) MMI	(West Germany) NÜR	(Sweden) SWE	Total
1	(Italy) Ferrari	(6)	8	8	(6)	8	24 (36)
2	(Italy) Maserati	8	2		8		18
3	(United Kingdom) Jaguar		4			3	7
4	(United Kingdom) Aston Martin		3		2		5
5	(Germany) Porsche		1		3		4
6	(Germany) Mercedes-Benz	1		1			2

Note:

- Points earned for race results but not counted towards the championship totals are shown within brackets in the above table.
- As the fourth and fifth placed cars at the Sveriges Grand Prix were ineligible for points, the sixth placed Jaguar was awarded points as if it had finished fourth.

== The cars ==
The following models contributed to the net championship point scores of their respective makes.

- Ferrari 860 Monza & Ferrari 290 MM
- Maserati 300S
- Jaguar D-Type
- Aston Martin DB3S
- Porsche 550 Spyder & Porsche 550 RS
- Mercedes-Benz 300 SL
