= 1956 Swedish Grand Prix =

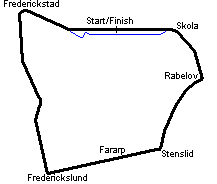
Layout of the Rabelövsbanan

The 1956 Sveriges Grand Prix took place on 12 August, at the Råbelövsbanan, Kristianstad. Although this was the second running of the race, it was the first time as a round of the F.I.A. World Sports Car Championship. The previous year's race, won by Juan Manuel Fangio was the first big race held in Sweden, and the organiser, Kungl Automobil Klubben dealt with it so well, the F.I.A. promoted the race. For this year's event, the circuit was widened and resurfaced.

== Report ==
=== Entry ===
A grand total of 29 racing cars were registered for this event, of which 28 arrived for practice and 27 for qualifying. Although this was the last round of the championship, there were only two manufacturers who could take the world title, namely Ferrari and Maserati. As a result, the entry list for this race was almost entirely Italian. Both teams were represented by five cars in the race. Ferrari send two 860 Monzas and three 290 MMs for their squad of 11 drivers, while Officine Alfieri Maserati was represented five Maserati 300S, and their team of 10. The only ray of hope from outside of Italy, were the trio of privately entered Jaguar D-Types.

=== Qualifying ===
During the three qualifying sessions held on three days prior to the race, everyone in the works Ferrari and Maserati teams drove all their team cars. After 570 minutes of qualifying, Maserati's Stirling Moss emerged the fastest, putting his 300S on pole.

=== Race ===
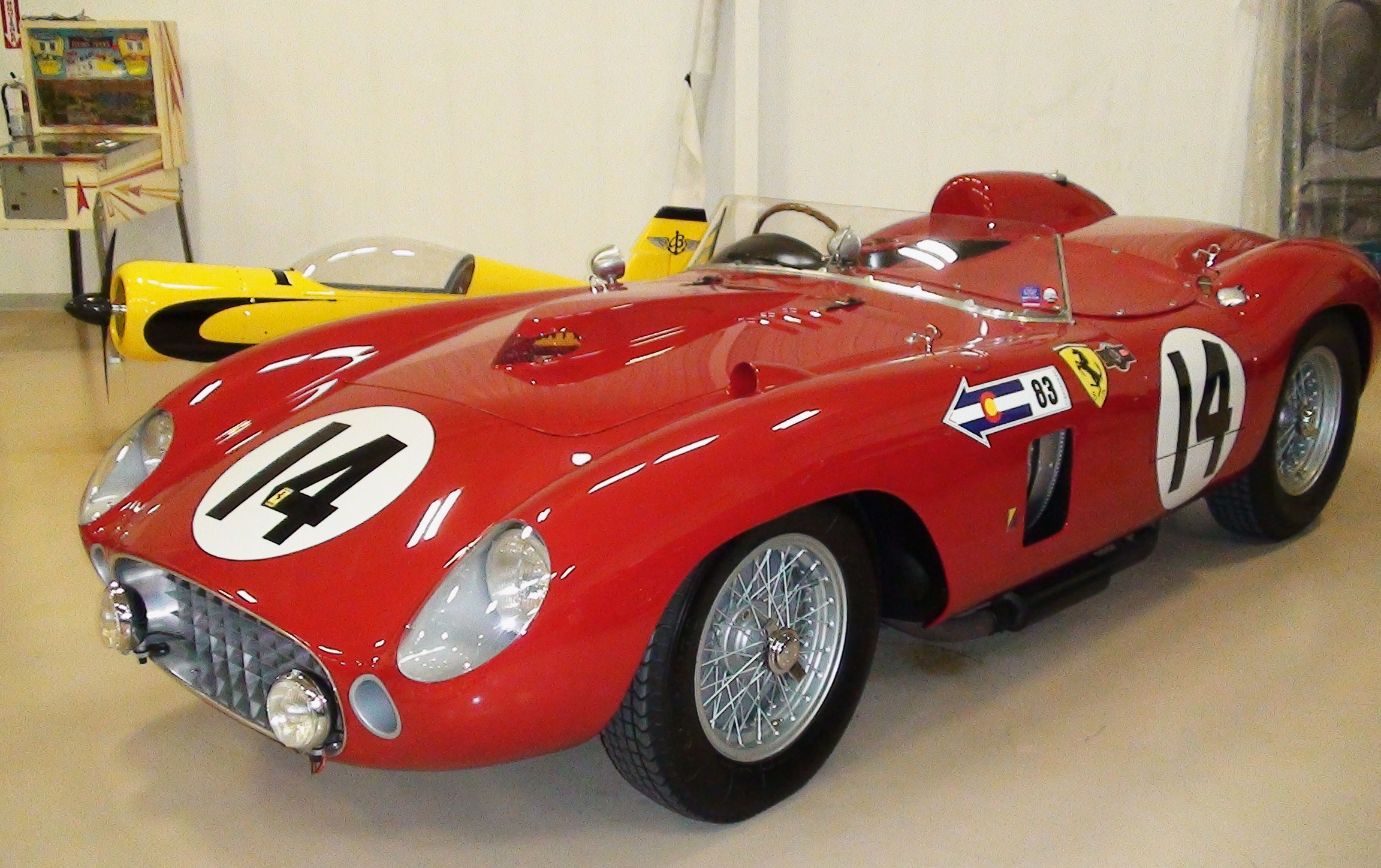
Ferrari 290 MM - similar to the car driven to victory by Hill / Trintignant

The race was held over 153 laps of the 4.062 miles, Rabelövsbanan, giving a distance of 621.472 miles (1,000.161 km). At 12 noon, in front of 37,500 spectators, Collins was first away, with both the Ecurie Nationale Belge cars having trouble starting, but getting away before the leaders returned to complete their first lap. A long line of scarlet red cars screamed across the line to complete the opening lap, led by the Ferrari of Peter Collins, with Stirling Moss, Mike Hawthorn, Benoît Musy, Wolfgang von Trips and Luigi Villoresi following chase behind. Already out was Piero Taruffi, having been hit by the Jaguar of Ron Flockhart when his brakes locked up. While Flockhart was able to limp back to the pits for repairs, Taruffi was out on the spot. After the first hour, the only change was that Hawthorn momentarily overdid things, and this let von Trips though into third.

Francisco Godin-Sales went off the road and was pushed back by the locals. He later stopped to hand over to Jo Bonnier, but due to axle damage the Maserati did not get far and retired on lap 25. A lap later, Musy's 300S was sidelined with gearbox troubles, while Flockhart gave his dented Jaguar to Ninian Sanderson. Just before two hour mark, the leaders began to make their routine stops for fuel and driver changes. Maurice Trintignant in sixth place gave over his Ferrari to Phil Hill, and Collins to Olivier Gendebien, while Moss took over the lead, followed by von Trips, Hawthorn and Eugenio Castellotti. Hawthorn went off the track again and into the undergrowth, so when he handed the car over to Alfonso de Portago, large clods of earth and gross dropped off the car. At 2:30pm, and on lap 61, both Moss and von Trips made their pit stops. Moss's Maserati took on fuel, rear wheels and with Jean Behra now behind the wheel, set off without losing the lead. Meanwhile, Collins took over from von Trips, and last of all Castellotti stopped and handed over to Fangio.

Once all the major stops were completed, Behra was in the lead, followed by Fangio, Collins, and Gendebien. As for the Jaguars, the Le Mans winning team, Ecurie Ecosse were as neat and quick as at Circuit de la Sarthe, with Jock Lawrence taken over from Sanderson, while Desmond Titterington replaced Flockhart.

The long procession of red sports cars suddenly turned into confusion, when Behra ran out of brakes and needed two stops to make adjustments, meanwhile Gendebien's Ferrari was leaking oil and stopped for a refill, letting Robert Manzon have a go. He did not go far before the engine's oil level dropped and stopped with a bang. Both Collins and Hill went off the road due to the resultant oil patch, while Portago was sideways on for a long while, during which Flockhart managed to avoid him by a small margin. Hill motored on through the corn field until he found his way back to the track, while Collins lost more time trying get back on the track, the same way he entered the field. This resulted in Fangio taking the lead, with Hill now in second, Portago third and Collins fourth. The leading Maserati was now in fifth with Harry Schell in the Villoresi car, and Behra struggling back in sixth. Flockhart retired with a blown engine when a rod broke, and Maserati decided to add Moss to the Villoresi/Schell car to try to improve on the fifth position. However, the pit stop did not go well, for fuel and oil was put in, while the rear wheels were changed. But everyone got in everyone's way, fuel was slopped over the pit lane, one mechanic tripped over the jack, and amidst the pools of oil, petrol and water. Moss eventually got away. Then Behra decided he was tired of driving without brakes, came in for Villoresi to take over. With gallons of petrol all over the car and the ground, suddenly there was a boomph and the whole lot was on fire. The prompt action of the fire brigade, who were ever at the ready, the whole pits might have gone up in flames. After a few tense moments, the Maserati lay under a heavy covering of foam, as was most of the pit crew. The explosion split the fuel tank, as the Maserati was wheeled away into retirement.

Moss was unable to improve on his fifth place. The order was Fangio, Portago, Hill and Collins, and by 5pm, all the Ferraris had undergone another round of driver changes. Castellotti took over from Fangio, Duncan Hamilton took the Portago car. Trips went back his own car from Collins, and Hill returned his 290 MM to Trintignant. By the time driver shuffling was complete, the order was Castellotti, Trintignant, Trips and Hawthorn. In the meantime, Moss had disappeared down an escape road with no brakes. Sanderson withdrawn the remaining Ecurie Ecosse Jaguar, with a failed rear axle. This left the local Swedish-driven Ferrari in fifth. Then, Castellotti engine blew, leaving the Trintignant at the head of the remaining cars.

It was all over now, and the Ferraris slowed their surviving car, ensuring they complete the last hour of racing, and with the race in the bag, Ferrari reclaimed the World Sportscar Championship. As a result of Castellotti's retirement, Hill and Trintignant in car number 3, took an impressive victory, winning in a time of 6hrs :33.47.7 mins., averaging a speed of 94.690 mph. In second was the Ferrari of Collins and von Trips, just 39.9s drift. The podium was complete by another works Ferrari, of Portago, Hawthorn and Hamilton, who were a lap adrift.

== Official Classification ==
Class Winners are in Bold text.

Pos	No	Class	Driver		Entrant	Chassis	Laps	Reason Out
1st	**3**	**S**	(France) **Maurice Trintignant**	(United States) **Phil Hill**	**Scuderia Ferrari**	**Ferrari 290 MM**	**6hr 33:47.7, 153**	
2nd	1	S	(United Kingdom) Peter Collins	(West Germany) Wolfgang von Trips	Scuderia Ferrari	Ferrari 290 MM	6hr 34:27.6, 153	
3rd	2	S	(Spain) Alfonso de Portago (United Kingdom) Mike Hawthorn	(United Kingdom) Duncan Hamilton (United Kingdom) Peter Collins	Scuderia Ferrari	Ferrari 860 Monza	152	
4th	**33**	**PS+2.0**	(Sweden) **John Kvarnström**	(Sweden) **Erik Lundgren**	**Tore Bjurström**	**Ferrari 750 Monza**	**148**	
5th	34	PS+2.0	(Sweden) Allan Borgfors	(Sweden) Carl-Gunnar Hammerlund	Tore Bjurström	Ferrari 750 Monza	93	
6th	16	S	(United Kingdom) Peter Whitehead	(United Kingdom) Graham Whitehead	Graham Whitehead	Jaguar D-Type	145	
7th	7	S	(Sweden) Sture Nottorp	(Sweden) Ivar Andersson	Tore Bjurström	Ferrari 410 S	145	
8th	**43**	**PS2.0**	(West Germany) **Richard von Frankenberg**	(United States) **William Buff**	**William Buff**	**Porsche 550 Spyder**	**138**	
9th	6	S	(Sweden) Olle Persson (United States) Herbert MacKay-Fraser	(United States) Robert Tappan	Robert E. Tappan	Ferrari 500 TR	138	
10th	46	PS2.0	(Sweden) Bengt Martenson	(Sweden) Björn Martenson	Bengt O. Martenson	Ferrari 500 Mondial	138	
11th	45	PS2.0	(West Germany) Peter Nöcker	(West Germany) Wolfgang Seidel	Wolfgang Seidel	Porsche 550 Spyder	134	
12th	41	PS2.0	(Belgium) Gilberte Thirion	(Belgium) Claude Dubois	Equipe Nationale Belge	Porsche 550 Spyder	133	
13th	44	PS2.0	(West Germany) Hans Herrmann	(Sweden) Gert Kaiser	Gert Kaiser	Porsche 550 Spyder	125	
14th	35	PS+2.0	(United Kingdom) Raymond Flower	(United Kingdom) FitzRoy Somerset	Raymond Flower	Austin-Healey 100 S	123	
DNF	4	S	(Argentina) Juan Manuel Fangio	(Italy) Eugenio Castellotti	Scuderia Ferrari	Ferrari 860 Monza	123	Engine
DNF	10	S	(Italy) Luigi Villoresi (United Kingdom) Stirling Moss	(Italy) Umberto Maglioli	Officine Alfieri Maserati	Maserati 300S	115	Engine
DNF	31	PS+2.0	(France) François Picard	(France) Jean-Claude Vidilles	François Picard	Ferrari 750 Monza	103	Gear change
DNF	8	S	(United Kingdom) Stirling Moss	(France) Jean Behra	Officine Alfieri Maserati	Maserati 300S	96	Fire
DNF	32	PS+2.0	(Sweden) Gunnar Carlsson	(Sweden) Erik Carlsson	Tore Bjurström	Ferrari 750 Monza	96	Brakes
DNF	15	S	(United Kingdom) Ron Flockhart (United Kingdom) Desmond Titterington	(United Kingdom) Ninian Sanderson	Ecurie Ecosse	Jaguar D-Type	94	Accident
DNF	36	PS+2.0	(Belgium) Alain de Changy	(Belgium) Freddy Rousselle	Equipe Nationale Belge	Ferrari 750 Monza	89	
DNF	14	S	(United Kingdom) Desmond Titterington	(United Kingdom) Jock Lawrence	Ecurie Ecosse	Jaguar D-Type	88	Engine
DNF	5	S	(United Kingdom) Peter Collins (France) Robert Manzon	(Belgium) Olivier Gendebien	Scuderia Ferrari	Ferrari 290 MM	73	Accident
DNF	42	PS2.0	(Netherlands) Mathieu Hezemans	(Netherlands) Hubert Oebels	Mathieu Hezemans	Porsche 550 Spyder	63	Ignition
DNF	12	S	(Switzerland) Beniôt Musy (United States) Harry Schell	(France) André Simon	Officine Alfieri Maserati	Maserati 300S	26	Gearbox
DNF	11	S	(Spain) Francisco Godia-Sales	(Sweden) Jo Bonnier	Officine Alfieri Maserati	Maserati 300S	25	Axle
DNF	9	S	(Italy) Piero Taruffi (Italy) Cesare Perdisa	(United States) Harry Schell	Officine Alfieri Maserati	Maserati 300S	0	Accident

- Fastest Lap: Peter Collins, 2:26.2secs (100.020 mph)

=== Class Winners ===
Class	Winners		
Special Sportscars	3	Ferrari 290 MM	Hill / Trintignant
Series Sportscar over 2000 ccm	33	Ferrari 750 Monza	Kvarnström / Lundgren
Series Sportscar under 2000 ccm	43	Porsche 550 Spyder	von Frankenberg / Buff

== Standings after the race ==
Pos	Championship	Points
1	(Italy) Ferrari	24 (36)
2	(Italy) Maserati	18
3	(United Kingdom) Jaguar	7
4	(United Kingdom) Aston Martin	5
5	(West Germany) Porsche	4

- Note: Only the top five positions are included in this set of standings.

Championship points were awarded for the first six places in each race in the order of 8-6-4-3-2-1. Manufacturers were only awarded points for their highest finishing car with no points awarded for positions filled by additional cars. Only the best 3 results out of the 5 races could be retained by each manufacturer. Total points scored are listed within brackets in the above table.

World Sportscar Championship
Previous race: 1000km of Nürburgring	1956 season	Next race: 1957 1000 km Buenos Aires

Preceded by 1955 Swedish Grand Prix	Swedish Grand Prix; 1956	Succeeded by 1957 Swedish Grand Prix
