= 1957 Swedish Grand Prix =

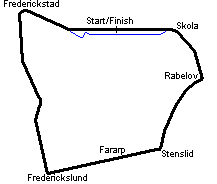
Layout of the Rabelövsbanan

The 1957 Sveriges Grand Prix took place on 11 August, at the Rabelövsbanan, Kristianstad. Although this was the third running of the race, it was the last time as round of the F.I.A. World Sports Car Championship, and to sportscar regulations. Held on the same bumpy circuit as in 1956, the race differed this time, as it was for a period of six hours, instead of 1,000 km, it being felt that a time race would be more acceptable to the Swedish public.

== Report ==
=== Entry ===
A grand total of 32 racing cars were registered for this event, of which 30 arrived for practice and 29 for qualified to race. Of the big manufacturers only Ferrari and Maserati entered official works teams, Jaguar fortunes being left in the hands of privateers, Ecurie Ecosse and Equipe Nationale Belge, which provided to being very successful at Le Mans in the previous round. As for Aston Martin, not a single car was to be seen in Sweden. The Officine Alfieri Maserati had two 450Ss, both being a Spyder version. They were backed-up by two Maserati 300Ss. As for drivers, the team had the choice of Stirling Moss, Jean Behra, Harry Schell, Giorgio Scarlatti and Jo Bonnier. As for Scuderia Ferrari, their entry consisted of two 335 Ss and a 250 TR, and they had the choice of Mike Hawthorn, Peter Collins, Luigi Musso, Phil Hill, Maurice Trintignant and Olivier Gendebien.

As for Le Mans winners, Ecurie Ecosse had two Jaguar D-Types presented for Jack Fairman, Jock Lawrence, Ninian Sanderson and Archie Scott Brown. The other Jag was run by the Equipe Nationale Belge and driven by Alain de Changy and Claude Debois. The Belgian outfit was entered three Ferraris and a Porsche 550.

=== Qualifying ===
During the two qualifying sessions held on two days prior to the race, the Maserati of Jean Behra emerged the fastest, putting his 450S on pole.

=== Race ===
At 12 noon, in front of 30,000 spectators, Hill was first away, however, Hawthorn soon tore past him into the lead and began to set the early pace, followed by Moss, Sanderson and Masten Gregory, who made a terrific in his smaller Ferrari. Behra who had made a leisurely start, was soon ahead of Gregory to claim fourth. Meanwhile, his team-mate Moss was into his stride and went past Hawthorn giving Maserati the lead. As for Hawthorn, he had been over using his brakes, while his team-mate Hill was content to take it easy and conserve his brakes, and therefore was not worry Behra passed him. After 30 minutes of racing Moss was leading from Hawthorn by 3 sec followed by Behra, Hill, Gregory, Sanderson, Gendebien, Bonnier and Lawrence. Such was the early pace those eight cars were the only ones on the same lap as the leaders. Shortly after this, Behra moved up into second place. Just a quarter of an hour later, Behra was right behind Moss and then went ahead. As for Hawthorn, he was now 17 sec behind at the end of the first hour.

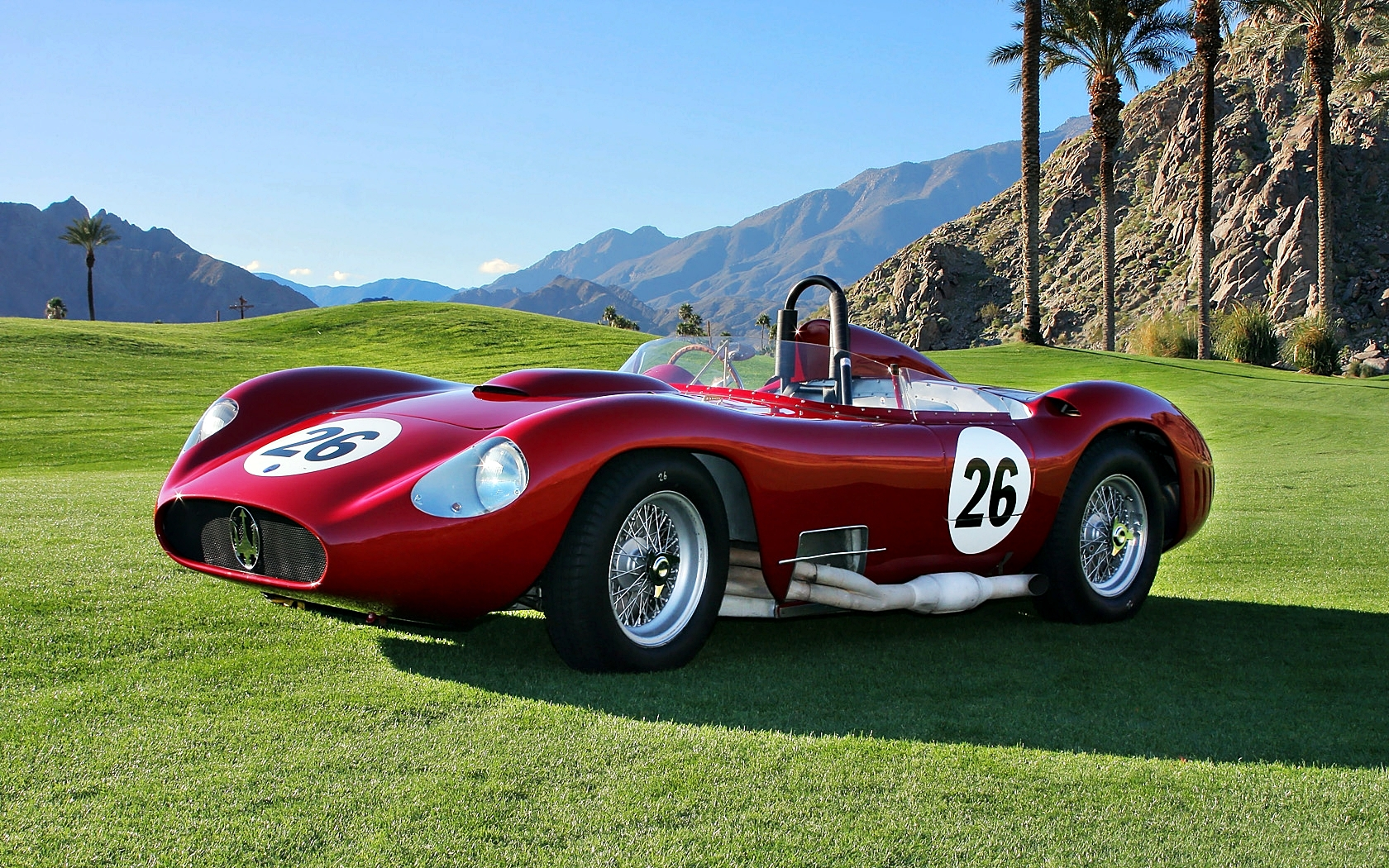
A Maserati 450S, similar to the race winning car of Behra & Moss, at the 2010 Annual Desert Classic Concours d’Elegance

Around the 45-minute mark, the Le Mans winning team, Ecurie Ecosse were as neat and quick as at Circuit de la Sarthe, with Sanderson’s car taken over from Jack Fairman, while Lawrence remained in the other Jag. Around an hour later, Hawthorn brought his Ferrari into the pits, the cars was refuelled and Musso took over the car, and it was seen that the car had been off the road at one point. An early sign, it was running out of brakes. Five minutes later, team-mate Gendebien pitted with a dead engine, and retired, leaving Trintignant among the ranks of the unwanted drivers. Meanwhile, on track Moss and Behra had now settled down to an impressive one-two, the Englishman leading, while Musso, Hill and Bonnier followed. Just after the two-hour mark, Moss brought the lead Maserati into the pits, it was refuelled and Schell took over and when Bonnier pitted, Scarlatti took over, even though the team had said he would be driving with Behra. It was clear that Maserati plan was to get both their 450S’s in first and second places, using their fastest three drivers, Moss, Behra and Schell. At 2:27pm, Hill came in and gave his car over to Collins, with the Ferrari now in second place, and then three minutes later, Behra came in with the leading Maserati and Moss took it over, spending just 50 seconds changing rear wheels and refuelling whilst retaining the lead. At the same time, Lawrence arrived sideways in the pits with a locking brake, but managed to avoid hitting anything and after a refuel Scott Brown took over. So now the positions were Moss, Collins, Schell, Musso with Scott Brown rounding out the top five.

Just before half distance, Schell’s Maserati started making unusual noises, and eventually slowed and pitted. As the drive shaft grease retaining seal had split, the team retired the car. Scarlatti was called into the pits and Schell took over the car. By now Moss’s lead over Collins was 65 seconds, about half-a-lap, with Musso a lap adrift in third. At 3:15pm, the windy dull day, turned worse with pouring rain. Collins started to lost ground rapidly, as his Ferrari’s brakes were being too erratic in the wet conditions, to take any chances. 15 minutes, later Musso trundled slowly towards pits with a punctured rear tyre, dropping the car down to fifth, behind Scott-Brown and Schell. The 30-minute spell of rain, Moss gained another half-a-lap on Collins, giving him a full lap advantage over his countryman.

After nearly four hours of racing, Moss stopped and handed his Maserati back to Behra, after refuelling it continued without losing the lead, though Collins did un-lap himself. There was just a five-minute rest before Schell was ordered back to the pits and the car handed over to Moss. When the rain stopped and the sun returned, the track dried quickly, so that Collins began to put on speed, but it was not enough to gain in Behra. As the final hour approached, Hill was ready to take over from Collins and Musso about to switch with Hawthorn, with Ferraris needing just one more fuel stop each. Although the team signalled Collins to pit, Hawthorn arrived pointing at the bonnet. As per normal, the Scuderia mechanics fuelled the car, the oil tank topped up, windscreen cleaned, rear wheels changed, drivers swapped and Musso was off. However, Hawthorn pitted early as the car’s water temperature was high and radiator needed water, not realising the fuel stops were nigh.

By now, Fairman was in trouble with his Jaguar having only second gear available in him. With just 45 minutes remaining, Musso suddenly pits with a smoking Ferrari. This was found to be a broken pipe with as leaking onto the exhaust system. The Scuderia mechanics hammered the offending pip flat, and Musso returned to the race with only three brakes. This resulted in Moss moving up the fourth in the 300S.

With only 15 minutes left the Scott Brown Jaguar, now being driven by Lawrence, was being caught by Moss, while Behra was safely in the lead, letting Hill un-lap himself, knowing that as long as he can see the Ferrari, he will win the race. Suddenly Lawrence oil pip broke, spraying him with oil. In the confusion, he hit a bank and split the fuel tank, so that Ecurie Ecosse hopes were over, as Fairman was still running with his gearbox troubles.

When the chequered flag fell, Behra won, with Hill second in the Ferrari. Moss came home in third in the older, smaller Maserati, while Musso took fourth. Behra and Moss in car number 7, took an impressive victory, winning in a time of 6hrs :01.01.1 mins., averaging a speed of 97.886 mph. In second was the Ferrari of Hill and Collins, one lap adrift. Although Maserati had achieved the win, their Italian rivals were still ahead in Championship points, thanks to Hill and Collins.

== Official classification ==
Class winners are in bold text.

Pos	No	Class	Driver		Entrant	Chassis	Laps	Reason Out
1st	**7**	**S+2.0**	(France) **Jean Behra**	(United Kingdom) **Stirling Moss**	**Officine Alfieri Maserati**	**Maserati 450S**	**6hr 01.01.1, 145**	
2nd	4	S+2.0	(United States) Phil Hill	(United Kingdom) Peter Collins	Scuderia Ferrari	Ferrari 335 S	144	
3rd	9	S+2.0	(Sweden) Jo Bonnier (United States) Harry Schell	(Italy) Giorgio Scarlatti (United Kingdom) Stirling Moss	Officine Alfieri Maserati	Maserati 300S	138	
4th	3	S+2.0	(United Kingdom) Mike Hawthorn	(Italy) Luigi Musso	Scuderia Ferrari	Ferrari 335 S	134	
5th	10	S+2.0	(Belgium) Alain de Changy	(Belgium) Claude Dubois	Equipe Nationale Belge	Jaguar D-Type	132	
6th	16	S+2.0	(Finland) Carl-Otto Bremer	(Finland) Esko Keinänen	Ferrari Svezia	Ferrari 750 Monza	132	
7th	14	S+2.0	(Sweden) Erik Carlsson	(Sweden) John Kvarnström	Ferrari Svezia	Ferrari 750 Monza	130	
8th	1	S+2.0	(United Kingdom) Jock Lawrence	(United Kingdom) Archie Scott Brown	Ecurie Ecosse	Jaguar D-Type	129	
9th	**25**	**S2.0**	(Finland) **Curt Lincoln**	(Finland) **Heimo Hietarinta**	**Scuderia Askolin**	**Ferrari 500 TRC**	**129**	
10th	28	S2.0	(Italy) Gino Munaron	(Cuba) Julio Batista Falla	Gino Munaron	Ferrari 500 TRC	128	
11th	2	S+2.0	(United Kingdom) Ninian Sanderson	(United Kingdom) Jack Fairman	Ecurie Ecosse	Jaguar D-Type	126	
12th	21	S2.0	(Belgium) Georges Harris	(Belgium) André Liekens	Equipe Nationale Belge	Ferrari 500 TRC	126	
13th	30	S2.0	(Sweden) Gert Kaiser	(Sweden) Harald Kronegård	Gert Kaiser	Porsche 550 RS	125	
14th	20	S2.0	(France) François Picard	(France) Jean Lucas	François Picard	Ferrari 500 TRC	121	
15th	26	S2.0	(Finland) Lars Finnilä	(Finland) Seppo Rikkilä	Scuderia Askolin	Ferrari 500 TRC	120	
16th	34	S2.0	(Sweden) Jon Fast	(Sweden) Gunnar Bengtsson	Jon Fast	Osca MT4 1500	120	
17th	22	S2.0	(Belgium) Yves Tassin	(Belgium) Georges Hacquin	Equipe Nationale Belge	Porsche 550 RS	116	
18th	35	S2.0	(United Kingdom) Cliff Allison	(United Kingdom) Innes Ireland	Team Lotus	Lotus-Climax Eleven	115	
NC	36	S2.0	(United Kingdom) Peter Ashdown	(United Kingdom) Alan Stacey	Team Lotus	Lotus-Climax Eleven	100	
NC	27	S2.0	(United Kingdom) Bill Frost	(United Kingdom) Mike Anthony	Mike Anthony	Lotus-Climax Eleven	91	
DNF	24	S2.0	(Sweden) Erik Lundgren	(Sweden) Carl-Gunnar Hammarlund	Ecurie Bonnier	Maserati 200S I	81	Fire
DNF	8	S+2.0	(United Kingdom) Stirling Moss	(United States) Harry Schell	Officine Alfieri Maserati	Maserati 450S	69	Rear axle
DNF	11	S+2.0	(Belgium) Willy Mairesse	(Belgium) Michel Ringoir	Scuderia Ferrari	Ferrari 290 MM	61	Transmission
DNF	33	S2.0	(Sweden) Bengt Martenson	(Sweden) Björn Martenson	Bengt Martenson	Ferrari 500 Mondial	61	Gearbox
DNF	5	S+2.0	(Belgium) Olivier Gendebien	(France) Maurice Trintignant	Scuderia Ferrari	Ferrari 250 TR	43	Engine
DNF	23	S2.0	(France) José Behra	(France) Léon Couliboeuf	José Behra	Maserati 200S I	43	Accident
DNF	6	S+2.0	(United States) Masten Gregory	(West Germany) Wolfgang Seidel	Scuderia Ferrari	Ferrari 250 TR	30	Gearbox
DNF	31	S2.0	(Argentina) Alejandro de Tomaso	(United States) Isabelle Haskell	Automobili Osca	Osca S1500	30	Accident
DNF	12	S+2.0	(Belgium) Jan de Vroom	(Belgium) Jacques Swaters	Equipe Nationale Belge	Ferrari 290 MM	23	Accident
DNS	15	S+2.0	(Sweden) Erik Carlsson	(Sweden) Olle Persson	Ferrari Svezia	Ferrari 750 Monza		Accident in practice
DNS	29		(Denmark) Julius Voigt-Nielsen	(Denmark) “Ilmigias”	Scuderia Palan	Porsche 550		DNS

- Fastest Lap: Jean Behra, 2:20.9secs (103.782 mph)

=== Class winners ===
Class	Winners		
Sportscar over 2000 cc	7	Maserati 450S	Behra / Moss
Sportscar under 2000 cc	25	Ferrari 500 TRC	Lincoln / Hietarinta

== Standings after the race ==
Pos	Championship	Points
1	(Italy) Ferrari	28 (33)
2	(Italy) Maserati	25 (27)
3	(United Kingdom) Jaguar	17
4	(United Kingdom) Aston Martin	8
5	(West Germany) Porsche	5

- Note: Only the top five positions are included in this set of standings.

Championship points were awarded for the first six places in each race in the order of 8-6-4-3-2-1. Manufacturers were only awarded points for their highest finishing car with no points awarded for positions filled by additional cars. Only the best 4 results out of the 7 races could be retained by each manufacturer. Points earned but not counted towards the championship totals are listed within brackets in the above table.

World Sportscar Championship
Previous race: 24 Hours of Le Mans	1957 season	Next race: Venezuelan Grand Prix

Preceded by 1956 Swedish Grand Prix	Swedish Grand Prix; 1957	Succeeded by 1967 Swedish Grand Prix
