= Duncan Hamilton (racing driver) =

British racing driver (1920-1994)

- Nationality: (United Kingdom) British
- Born: James Duncan Hamilton; 30 April 1920 Cork, County Cork, Ireland
- Died: 13 May 1994 (aged 74) Sherborne, Dorset, England
Duncan Hamilton
Formula One World Championship career
- Active years: 1951–1953
- Team(s): privateer Talbot-Lago, HWM
- Entries: 5
- Championships: 0
- Wins: 0
- Podiums: 0
- Career points: 0
- Pole positions: 0
- Fastest laps: 0
- First entry: 1951 British Grand Prix
- Last entry: 1953 British Grand Prix
24 Hours of Le Mans career
- Years: 1950–1958
- Teams: Nash-Healey Motors, Jaguar Cars Ltd., Scuderia Ferrari, J. Duncan Hamilton
- Best finish: 1st (1953)
- Class wins: 1 (1953)

James Duncan Hamilton (30 April 1920 – 13 May 1994) was a British racing driver. He was known for his colourful and extroverted personality. After fighting in the Second World War, he took up motorsport. Although adept in single-seaters, he was more successful in sportscars, winning the 1953 24 Hours of Le Mans, two Coupe de Paris events, and the 12 heures internationals Reims race in 1956. He retired in 1958 and ran a garage in Bagshot, Surrey for many years. He died of lung cancer in 1994.

== Early years ==
Born in County Cork, Hamilton was brought up in relative obscurity. During the Second World War, he flew Lysanders in the Fleet Air Arm. After the war ended, he opened a car garage. During the years between the war ending and the start of the 1950s, Hamilton started racing in local events. He began racing in such cars as the MG R-type and the Bugatti Type 35B. After racing a Maserati 6CM in 1948, Hamilton began driving a Talbot-Lago Grand Prix car.

== Formula One career ==
Hamilton participated in five World Championship Grands Prix and 18 non-Championship Formula One races. His Grand Prix debut was at the 1948 Zandvoort Grand Prix, where he placed fourth with a Maserati 6CM. However, at his last race of 1948, the RAC International Grand Prix, the first official post-WW2 British Grand Prix, he retired with oil pressure problems.

Throughout the 1949 Grand Prix season, Hamilton only suffered one retirement, however he did not finish higher than ninth. He managed this feat twice, with both times being at Goodwood. The following season, he competed in fewer Grand Prix races, while he expanded his racing experience by racing sportscars. He won the Wakefield Trophy, a minor Formula Libre race, held at the Curragh in the Republic of Ireland.

Hamilton finished third in the 1951 Richmond Trophy (ERA B-Type), second in the 1951 BRDC International Trophy (Talbot-Lago T26C), third in the 1952 Richmond Trophy (Talbot-Lago T26C) and fourth in the 1952 Internationales ADAC Eifelrennen (HWM-Alta).

Hamilton was known for his skilled driving in wet weather. At the BRDC International Trophy race at Silverstone in 1951, he beat world champion Juan Manuel Fangio, finishing second to Reg Parnell.

== 24 Hours of Le Mans ==
Hamilton took part in the 24 Hours of Le Mans endurance race nine times, most famously in partnership with Tony Rolt. The pair finished fourth at their first attempt in the 1950 race and sixth in 1951, both times in a special-bodied Nash-Healey coupe. Their Jaguar C-Type did not finish in 1952, but they returned with a C-Type to win in 1953. They were second with a Jaguar D-Type in 1954, losing to a much larger-engined V12 Ferrari. They came within two miles of victory, with Hamilton halving the lead of the Scuderia Ferrari of José Froilán González and Maurice Trintignant in the final stages of the race, as the track was awash following a cloudburst. As the track started to dry out, the Ferrari maintained the lead. He did not finish in 1955. In 1956, Hamilton partnered Alfonso de Portago in a Ferrari but again did not finish. In 1957 he reverted to a Jaguar D-Type and partnered with the American driver Masten Gregory to finish sixth. His last Le Mans appearance was in 1958, when the D-Type he shared with Ivor Bueb failed to finish.

Hamilton also won the 1956 Rheims 12-hour race for Jaguar with a D-Type co-driven by Ivor Bueb. Despite the win, the factory dropped him from their 1956 Le Mans roster for speeding up and passing team-mate Paul Frère's car at Rheims when Lofty England had ordered the entire team to slow down, hence his switch to a Ferrari that year. In 1957 Jaguar did not enter Le Mans as cars and equipment had been destroyed by a fire at the factory. Instead, Hamilton used his privately owned D-Type.

=== 1953 Le Mans Victory ===
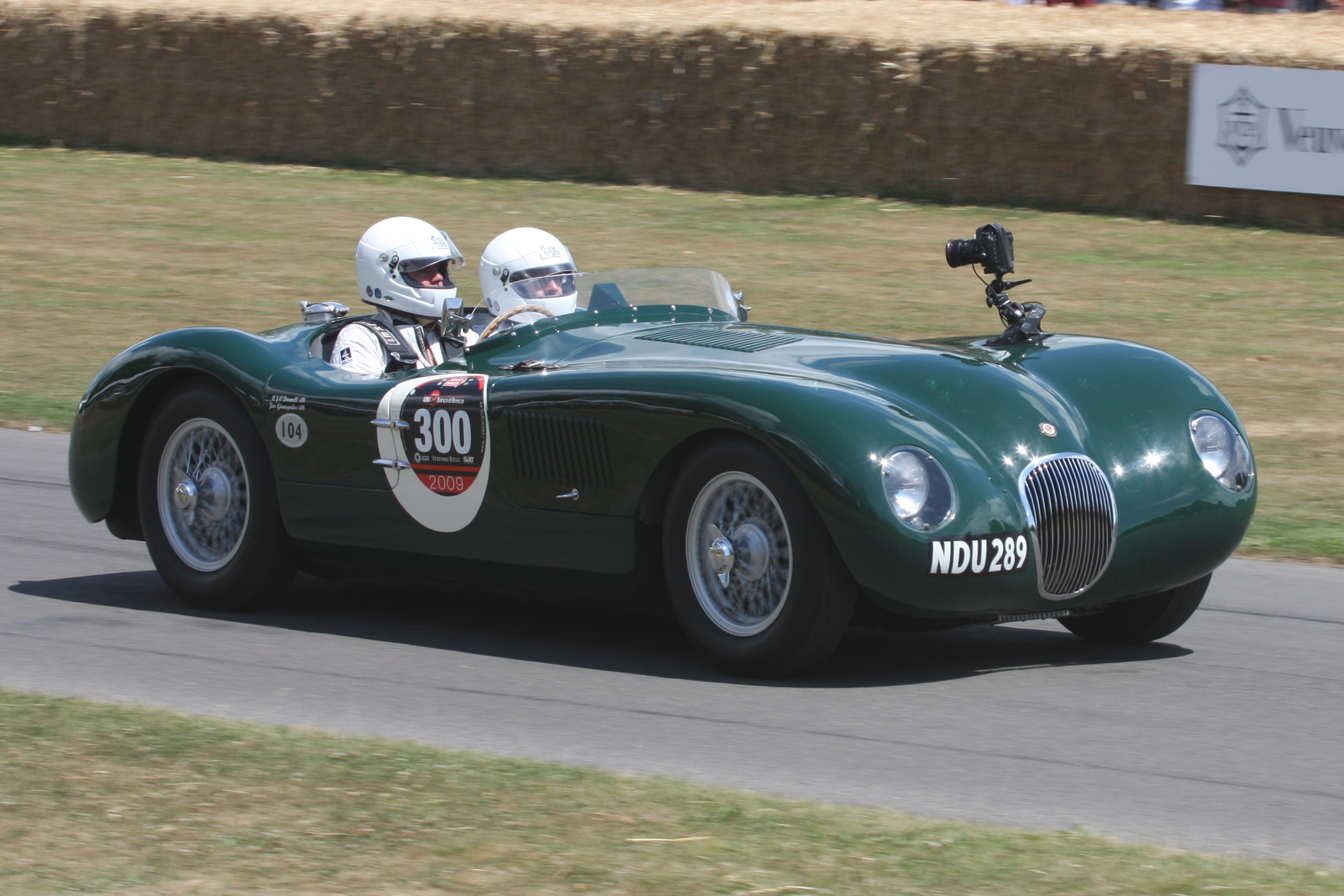
Jaguar C-Type, similar to that which Hamilton and Rolt drove to victory at Le Mans

Hamilton won the 1953 event in a Jaguar C-Type shared with Rolt. Initially, the pairing were disqualified for practising in a Jaguar that had the same racing number as another on the circuit at the same time, but they were reinstated. According to Hamilton's own account, when Jaguar team manager Lofty England persuaded the organisers to let them race, both drivers were already drunk in a local bar. England said: "Of course I would never have let them race under the influence. I had enough trouble when they were sober!"

When the race was under way, the team tried to sober Hamilton up by giving him coffee during the pit stops but he refused it, saying it made his arms twitch; instead he was given brandy. He also struck a bird face first at 130 mph and broke his nose. Despite the circumstances, the duo went on to win the race and recorded the first 100 mph average speed at Le Mans.

Both England and Rolt have denied that they were drunk.

== Lucky escapes ==
On one occasion in 1947, Hamilton was transporting his MG R-type to the Brighton Speed Trials. While going down a hill near Guildford, he "saw the splendid honeycomb radiator of a Bugatti in the outside rear-view mirror", so he moved over and waved it past. However, the car hung back. Further down the hill, the Bugatti drew level with Hamilton, at which point he saw there was no one in it and realised it was his own car which he had forgotten he was towing.

A week after the 1953 Le Mans win, Hamilton drove to Oporto to prepare for the Portuguese Grand Prix at the Circuito da Boavista. He was leading into the first corner of the race when he crashed his Jaguar into an electricity pylon. He was thrown out of the car and into a tree, from which he fell down on the side of the circuit and was almost run over by a Ferrari. He was taken to hospital for an emergency operation. The accident cut off the power supply to Oporto for several hours.

== Retirement ==
Hamilton sustained injuries during the 1958 24 Hours of Le Mans, while contesting the lead in his Jaguar D-Type, and then he was affected by the death of his friend Mike Hawthorn in early 1959. He retired from racing in 1959, and concentrated on his garage business in Byfleet. His love and passion for classic cars had led Hamilton to establish his own company back in 1948. Since then, Duncan Hamilton & Co Limited have become internationally recognised specialists in historic cars.

Hamilton co-wrote an autobiography called Touch Wood! He died in Sherborne, Dorset. His son Adrian Hamilton, a classic car dealer, ran his father's garage in another location until his own death in 2021. Hamilton's grandson Archie Hamilton is also a racing driver, who competed in the 24 Hours of Le Mans in 2013 and 2014.

== Racing record ==
=== Career highlights ===
Season	Series	Position	Team	Car
1950	Wakefield Trophy	1st		Maserati 6CM
1951	BRDC International Trophy	2nd	Duncan Hamilton	Talbot-Lago T26C
	Richmond Trophy	3rd		ERA B-Type
	Wakefield Trophy	3rd	HWM	HWM
1952	Richmond Trophy	3rd	Duncan Hamilton	Talbot-Lago T26C
1953	Les 24 Heures du Mans	1st	Jaguar Cars Ltd.	Jaguar C-Type
1954	Coupes de Paris	1st	Duncan Hamilton	Jaguar C-Type
	Aintree International	2nd	Duncan Hamilton	Jaguar C-Type
	Les 24 Heures du Mans	2nd	Jaguar Cars Ltd.	Jaguar D-Type
	12 heures internationals – Voiture Sport Reims	2nd	Jaguar Cars Ltd.	Jaguar D-Type
	Hedemoraloppet	3rd	Duncan Hamilton	Jaguar C-Type
1955	Johnson's Trophy	1st	Duncan Hamilton	Jaguar D-Type
	Coupes de Paris	2nd	Duncan Hamilton	Jaguar D-Type
	Grand Prix de Dakar	3rd	Duncan Hamilton	Jaguar D-Type
	Grande Prémio di Portugal	3rd	Duncan Hamilton	Jaguar D-Type
1956	Prix de Paris	1st	Duncan Hamilton	Jaguar D-Type
	12 heures internationals Reims	1st	Jaguar Cars	Jaguar D-Type
	GP des Frontières	2nd	Duncan Hamilton	Jaguar D-Type
	Coupes des Salon	2nd	Duncan Hamilton	Jaguar D-Type
	BRDC Daily Express International Trophy [TC]	3rd	Jaguar Cars	Jaguar 2.4 Litre
	Sveriges Grand Prix	3rd	Scuderia Ferrari	Ferrari 860 Monza
1957	BRDC Daily Express International Trophy [TC]	2nd	Jaguar Cars	Jaguar 2.4 Litre
	Aintree International	3rd		Jaguar D-Type
1958	Whitsun Trophy	2nd		Jaguar D-Type
	Sussex Trophy	3rd		Jaguar D-Type

=== Complete Formula One World Championship results ===
(key)

Year	Entrant	Chassis	Engine	1	2	3	4	5	6	7	8	9	WDC	Points
1951	Duncan Hamilton	Talbot-Lago T26C	Talbot-Lago S6	SUI	500	BEL	FRA	GBR; 12	GER; Ret	ITA	ESP		NC	0
1952	HW Motors	HWM 52	HWM S4	SUI	500	BEL	FRA	GBR; Ret	GER	NED; 7	ITA		NC	0
1953	HW Motors	HWM 53	HWM S4	ARG	500	NED	BEL	FRA	GBR; Ret	GER	SUI	ITA	NC	0

=== Complete 24 Hours of Le Mans results ===
Year	Team	Co-Drivers	Car	Class	Laps	Pos.	Class Pos.
1950	(United Kingdom) Healey Motors Ltd.	(United Kingdom) Tony Rolt	Nash-Healey E	S5.0	250	4th	3rd
1951	(United Kingdom) Healey	(United Kingdom) Tony Rolt	Nash-Healey Coupé	S5.0	250	6th	4th
1952	(United Kingdom) Jaguar Ltd.	(United Kingdom) Tony Rolt	Jaguar C-Type	S5.0		DNF (Head gasket)	
1953	(United Kingdom) Jaguar Cars Ltd.	(United Kingdom) Tony Rolt	Jaguar C-Type	S5.0	304	1st	1st
1954	(United Kingdom) Jaguar Cars Ltd.	(United Kingdom) Tony Rolt	Jaguar D-Type	S5.0	301	2nd	2nd
1955	(United Kingdom) Jaguar Cars Ltd.	(United Kingdom) Tony Rolt	Jaguar D-Type	S5.0	186	DNF (Gearbox)	
1956	(Italy) Scuderia Ferrari	(Spain) Alfonso de Portago	Ferrari 625 LM Touring	S3.0	2	DNF (Accident)	
1957	(United Kingdom) D. Hamilton	(United States) Masten Gregory	Jaguar D-Type	S5.0	299	6th	6th
1958	(United Kingdom) J. Duncan Hamilton	(United Kingdom) Ivor Bueb	Jaguar D-Type	S3.0	251	DNF (Accident)	

=== Complete 12 Hours of Sebring results ===
Year	Team	Co-Drivers	Car	Class	Laps	Pos.	Class Pos.
1956	(United States) Jaguar of New York Distributors Inc.	(United Kingdom) Ivor Bueb	Jaguar D-Type	S5.0	63	DNF (Brakes)	

=== Complete 12 Hours of Reims results ===
Year	Team	Co-Drivers	Car	Class	Laps	Pos.	Class Pos.
1954	(United Kingdom) Jaguar Cars Ltd.	(United Kingdom) Tony Rolt	Jaguar D-Type		214	2nd	2nd
1956	(United Kingdom) Jaguar Cars	(United Kingdom) Ivor Bueb	Jaguar D-Type	S3.5		1st	1st

=== Complete 12 Hours of Pescara results ===
Year	Team	Co-Drivers	Car	Class	Pos.	Class Pos.
1953	(United Kingdom) Peter Whitehead	(United Kingdom) Peter Whitehead	Jaguar C-Type	S+2.0	DNF (Steering)	

=== Complete 12 Hours of Hyères results ===
Year	Team	Co-Drivers	Car	Class	Pos.	Class Pos.
1954	(United Kingdom) Peter Whitehead	(United Kingdom) Peter Whitehead	Cooper-Climax T33		DNS	

Sporting positions
Preceded by Hermann Lang; Fritz Riess	Winner of the 24 Hours of Le Mans; 1953; With: Tony Rolt	Succeeded by José Froilán González; Maurice Trintignant
Preceded by Inaugural	Wakefield Trophy; 1950	Succeeded by Stirling Moss
Preceded by Peter Whitehead; Ken Wharton (1954)	12 Hours of Reims; Winner; 1956	Succeeded by Olivier Gendebien; Paul Frère
