= Maserati (disambiguation) =

Maserati is Italian automobile manufacturer.

It may also refer to:

== People ==
- Maserati brothers, Italian automotive engineers
  - Alfieri Maserati (1887–1932)
  - Bindo Maserati (1883–1980)
  - Carlo Maserati (1881–1910)
  - Ernesto Maserati (1898–1975)
  - Ettore Maserati (1894–1990)
- Alessandro Maserati (born 1979), Italian pro cyclist
- Tony Maserati, U.S. music producer

== Other uses ==
- Maserati (motorcycle), Italian motorcycle maker and automotive component manufacturer
- Maserati (band), U.S. rock band
- Trofeo Maserati (Maserati Trophy) single marque motorsport championship

== See also ==
- Mazarati, a 1980s R&B band from Minneapolis
