= Maserati A6 =

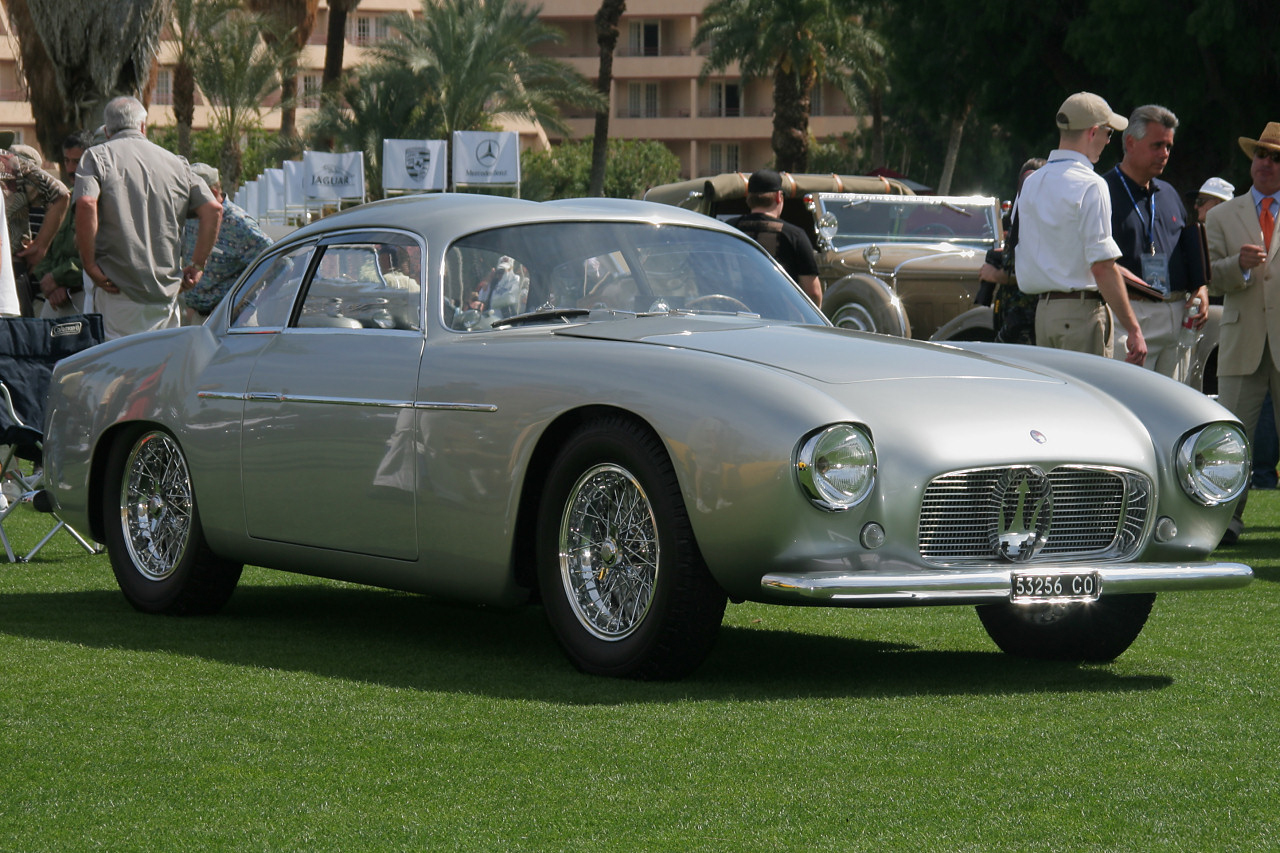
- 1956 A6G/54 Zagato Coupé Speciale

Overview
- Manufacturer: Maserati
- Production: 1947–1956
- Assembly: Italy: Modena
- Designer: Ernesto Maserati, Alberto Massimino and Gioacchino Colombo

Body and chassis
- Class: Grand tourer

Powertrain
- Engine: 1.5 L I6; 2.0 L I6
- Transmission: 4-speed manual

Dimensions
- Wheelbase: 2,550 mm (100.4 in)

Chronology
- Predecessor: Maserati 6CM (racing cars)
- Successor: Maserati 200S and 150S (racing cars); Maserati 3500 GT (road cars)

Maserati A6 were a series of grand tourers, racing sports cars and single seaters made by Maserati of Italy between 1947 and 1956. They were named for Alfieri Maserati (one of the Maserati brothers, founders of Maserati) and for their straight-six engine.

The 1.5-litre straight-six was named A6 TR (Testa Riportata for its detachable cylinder head), and was based on the pre-war Maserati 6CM and produced 65 hp (48 kW). It first appeared in the A6 Sport or Tipo 6CS/46, a barchetta prototype, developed by Ernesto Maserati and Alberto Massimino. This became the A6 1500 Pinin Farina-designed two-door berlinetta, first shown at the 1947 Salon International de l'Auto in Geneva (59 made) and the spider shown at the 1948 Salone dell'automobile di Torino (2 made).

A 2-litre, 120-horsepower straight-six was used in the A6 GCS two-seater, "G" denoting Ghisa, cast iron block, and "CS" denoting Corsa Sport.

The A6G were a series of two-door coupés and spyders for street, rather than competition use. These were bodied by Pinin Farina, Pietro Frua, Ghia, Bertone, Carrozzeria Allemano, Zagato, and Vignale. These have cast iron engine blocks. The Maserati A6 was typically fitted with 16-inch Borrani Wheels and Pirelli Stella Bianca Tyres.

== Introduction ==
The acronyms identifying each model are interpreted as follows:

- A6: the name of the series: A for Alfieri (Maserati), 6 for six cylinders.
- G: «Ghisa», cast iron, the engine block material.
- CS: «Corsa Sport», for racing sports car.
- CM: «Corsa Monoposto», for single seater racing car.

"1500" or "2000" indicate the rounded up total engine displacement in cubic centimetres; while suffixes such as "53" denote the year of the type's introduction.

== A6 Sport ==
Ernesto Maserati started work on the Tipo 6CS/46, also called A6 Sport or A6CS, in 1945. Designed together with Alberto Massimino, two prototype barchettas had been completed in late 1946 for the 1947 racing season. The 6CS/46 used the 1.5-litre (1,493 cc) straight-six engines from the pre-war Maserati 6CM. These took the first two places at Circuito di Piacenza on 11 May 1947, driven by Giulio Barbieri and Mario Angiolini. It is likely that the "Maserati 6CS 1500" which won at Voghera in October 1946 with Luigi Villoresi at the wheel is also one of this type.

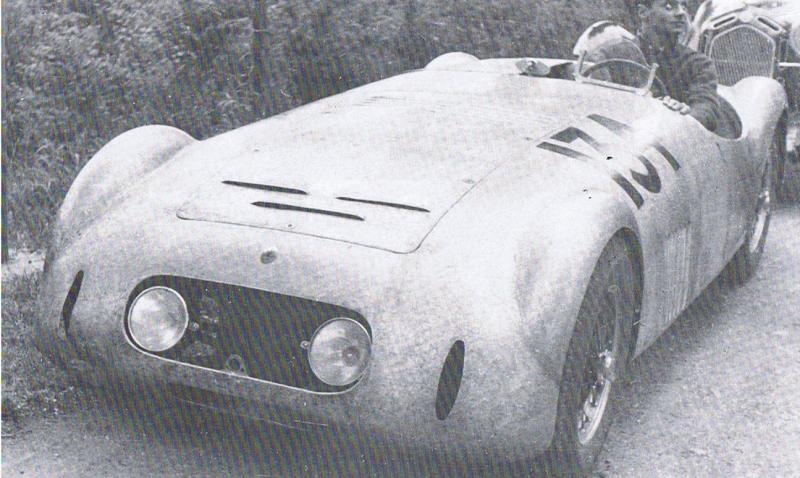
A6CS Barchetta

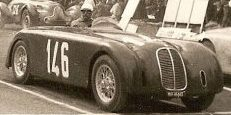
Maserati A6CS at Piacenza in 1947

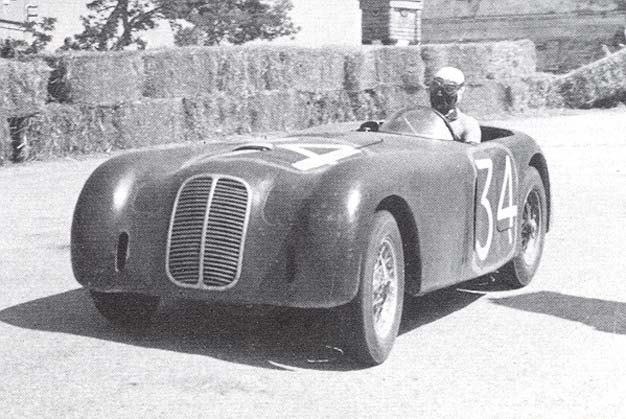
Felice Bonetto in an A6 Sport at Pescara in 1947

== A6GCS ==
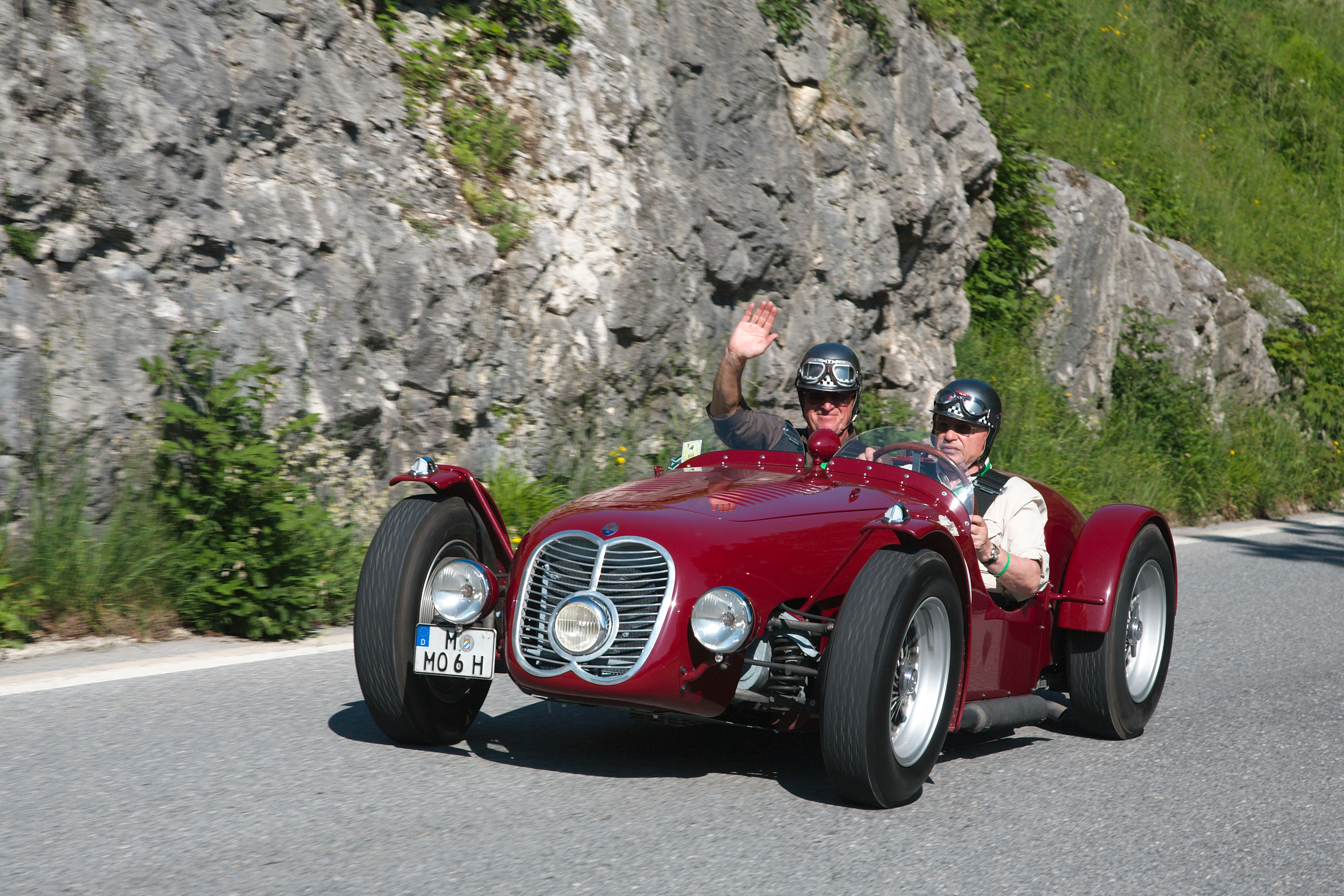
Maserati A6GCS "Monofaro"

In 1947 Maserati developed a two-seater sports racing car powered by a 2-litre engine called A6GCS. At first it produced 120 hp (88 kW), but it was further upgraded in 1952. The displacement is 1,978 cc (120.7 cu in) from a 72 mm × 81 mm (2.83 in × 3.19 in) bore and stroke.

The A6 GCS is often also called Monofaro, referring to its single headlamp. This cycle-winged racing version made its first competition appearance at Modena 1947 with Luigi Villoresi and Alberto Ascari, and won the 1948 Italian Championship with Giovanni Bracco at the wheel. Weight ranged from 580 to 670 kg (1,280 to 1,480 lb). Fifteen cars were made between 1947 and 1953, two being exported to Brazil and one to the United States.

== A6 1500 ==
Maserati A6 1500
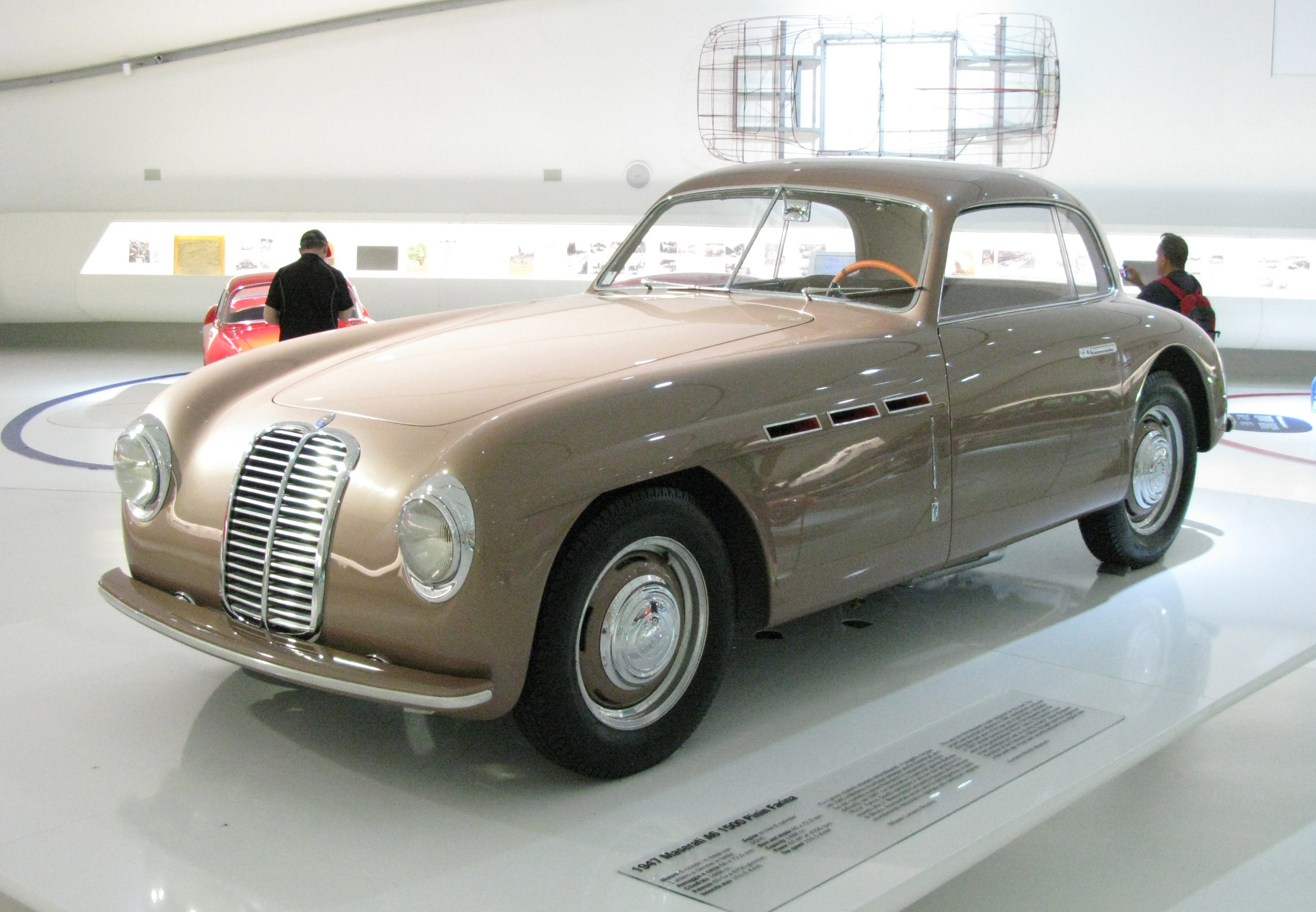
- 1947 A6 1500 Pinin Farina

Overview
- Also called: 1500 Gran Turismo
- Production: 1947–1950; 61 produced

Powertrain
- Engine: 1.5 L SOHC I6
- Transmission: 4-speed manual

The A6 1500 (officially 1500 Gran Turismo) grand tourer was Maserati's first production road car. Development was started in 1941 by the Maserati brothers, but it was halted as priorities shifted to wartime production and was only completed after the war.

The first chassis, bodied by Pinin Farina, debuted at the Geneva Salon International de l'Auto in March 1947. This first prototype was a two-door, two-seat, three-window berlinetta with triple square portholes on its fully integrated front wings, a tapered cabin and futuristic hidden headlamps. The car was put into low volume production, and most received Pinin Farina coachwork. For production Pinin Farina toned down the prototype's design, switching to conventional headlamps; soon after a second side window was added. Later cars received a different 2+2 fastback body style. A Pinin Farina Convertibile was shown at the 1948 Salone dell'automobile di Torino, and two were made; one car was also given a distinctive coupé Panoramica body by Zagato in 1949, featuring an extended greenhouse. Sixty-one A6 1500s were built between 1947 and 1950, when it began to be gradually replaced by the A6G 2000.

The A6 1500 was powered by a 1,488 cc (1.5 L) inline-six (bore 66 mm, stroke 72.5 mm), with a single overhead camshaft and a single Weber carburettor, producing 65 hp (48 kW); starting from 1949 some cars were fitted with triple carburettors. Top speed varied from 146 to 154 km/h (91 to 96 mph) depending on gearing and bodywork. The chassis was built out of tubular and sheet steel sections. Suspension was by double wishbones at the front and solid axle at the rear, with Houdaille hydraulic dampers and coil springs on all four corners.

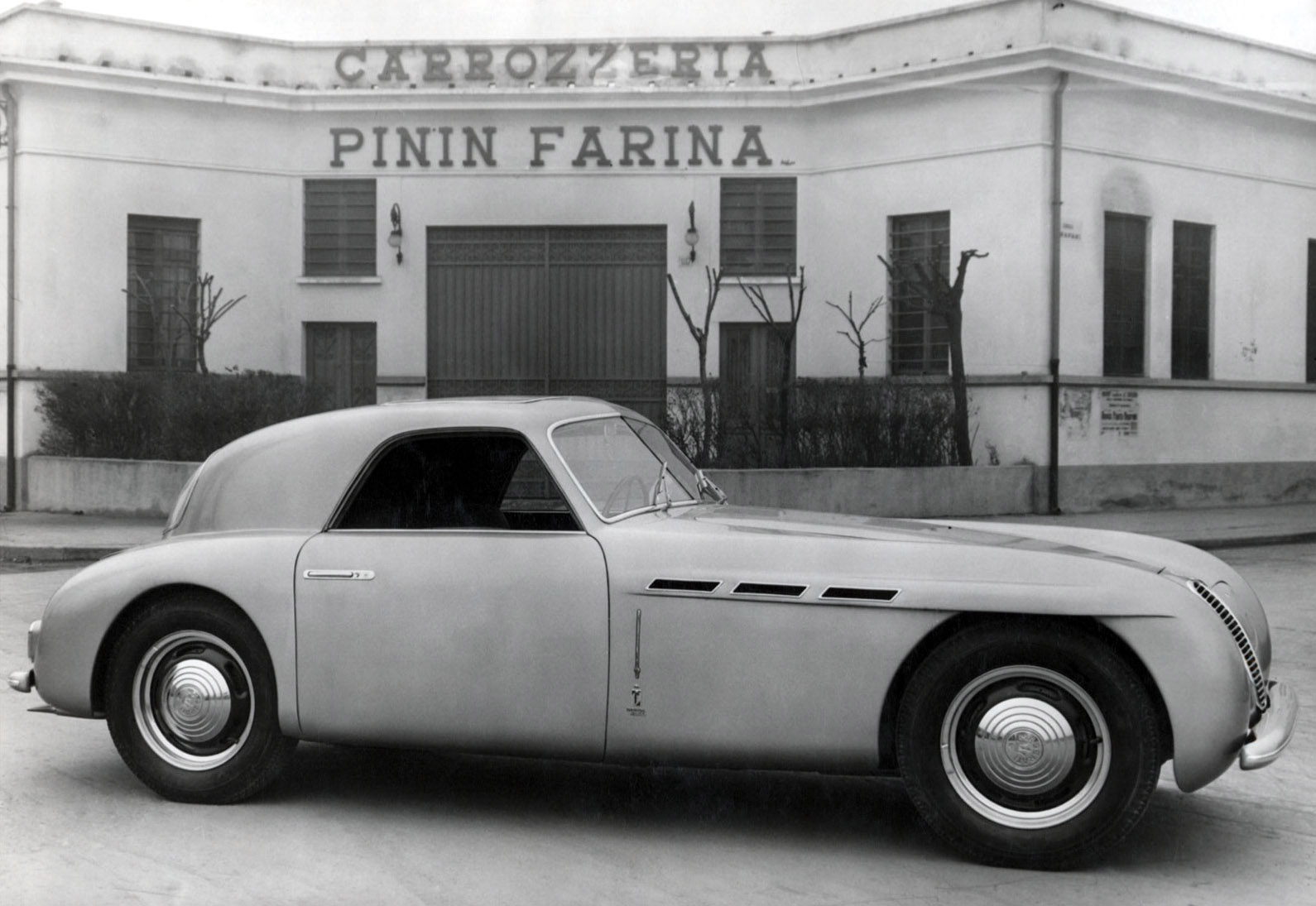
First prototype by Pinin Farina

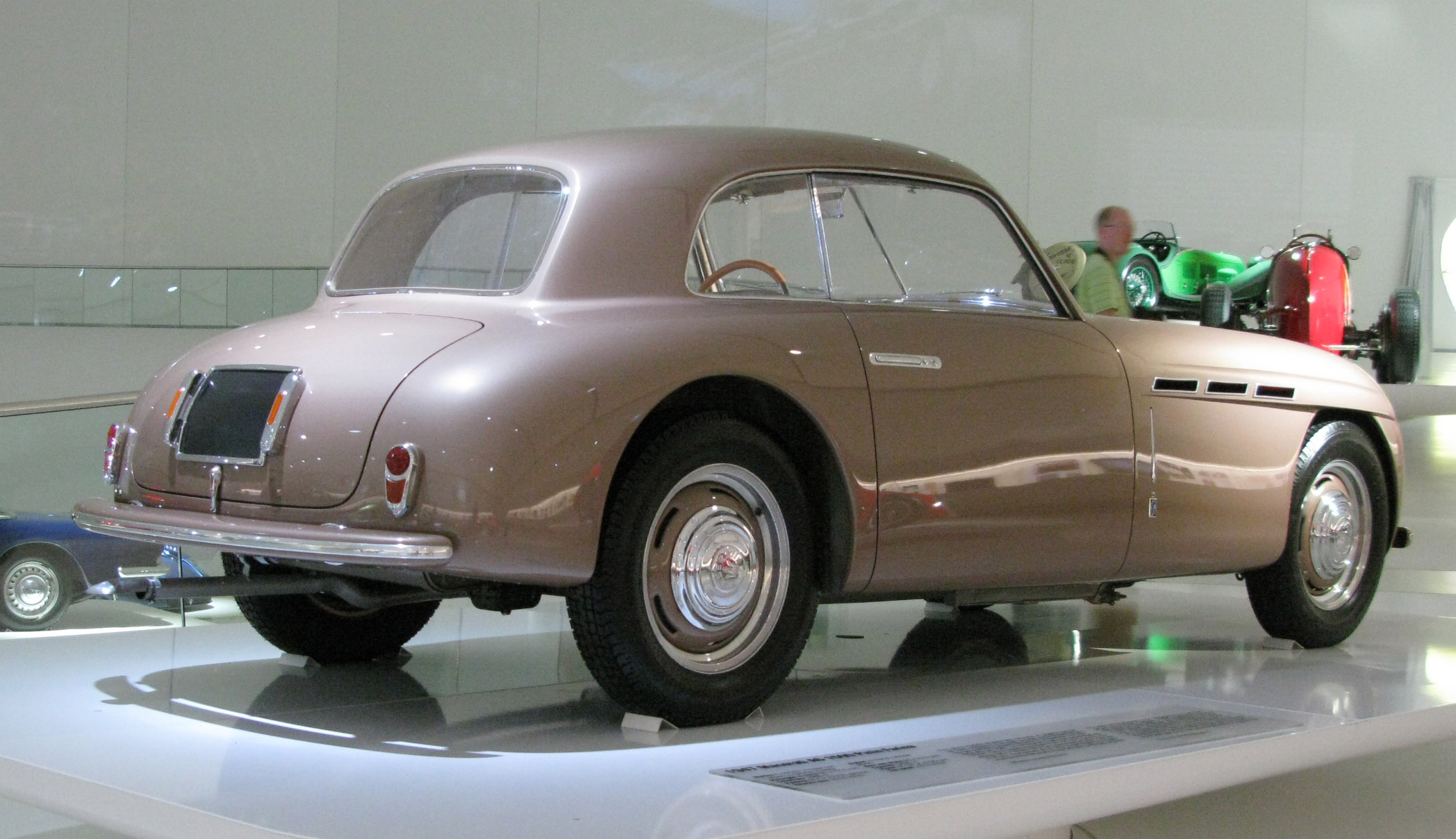
Rear view, early Pinin Farina body style.

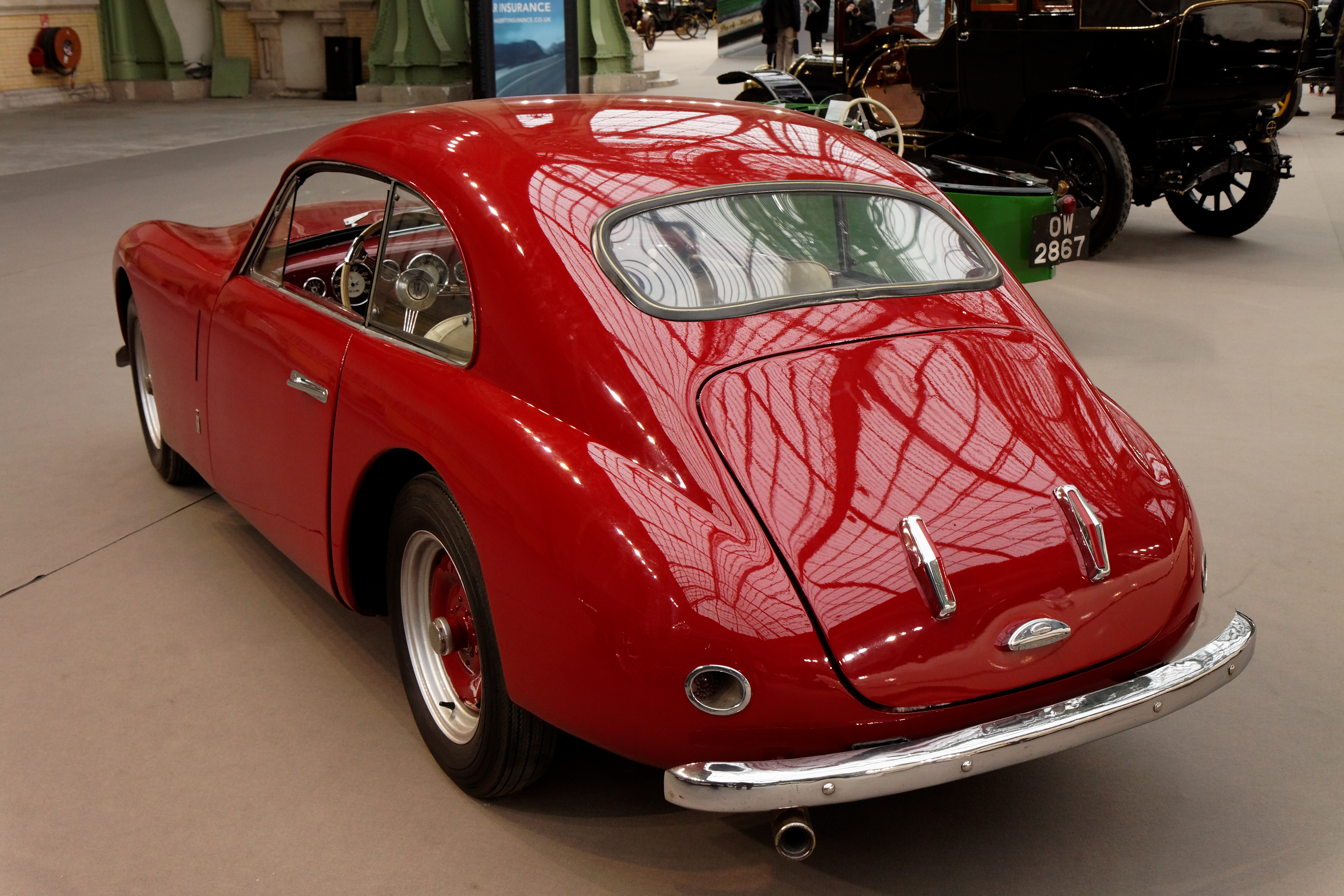
Late Pinin Farina 2+2 fastback.

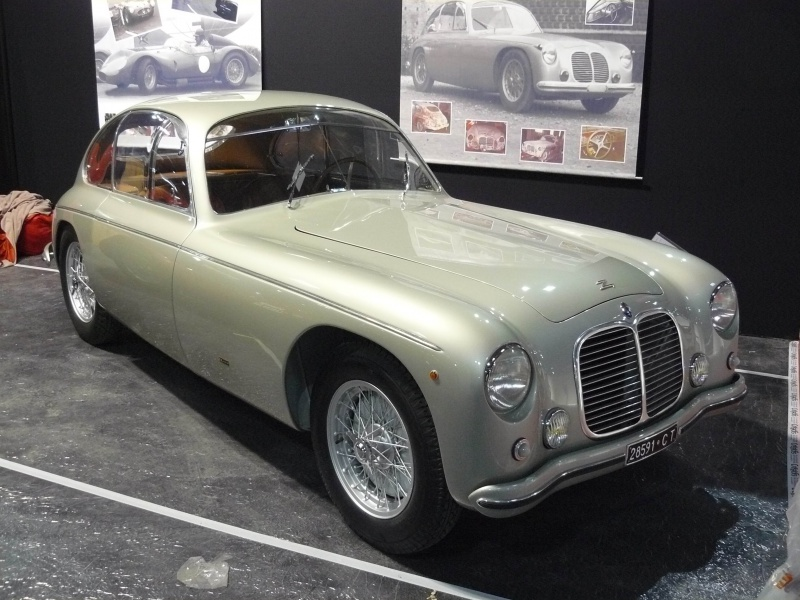
The one-off A6 1500 Zagato Panoramica.

== A6G 2000 ==
Maserati A6G 2000
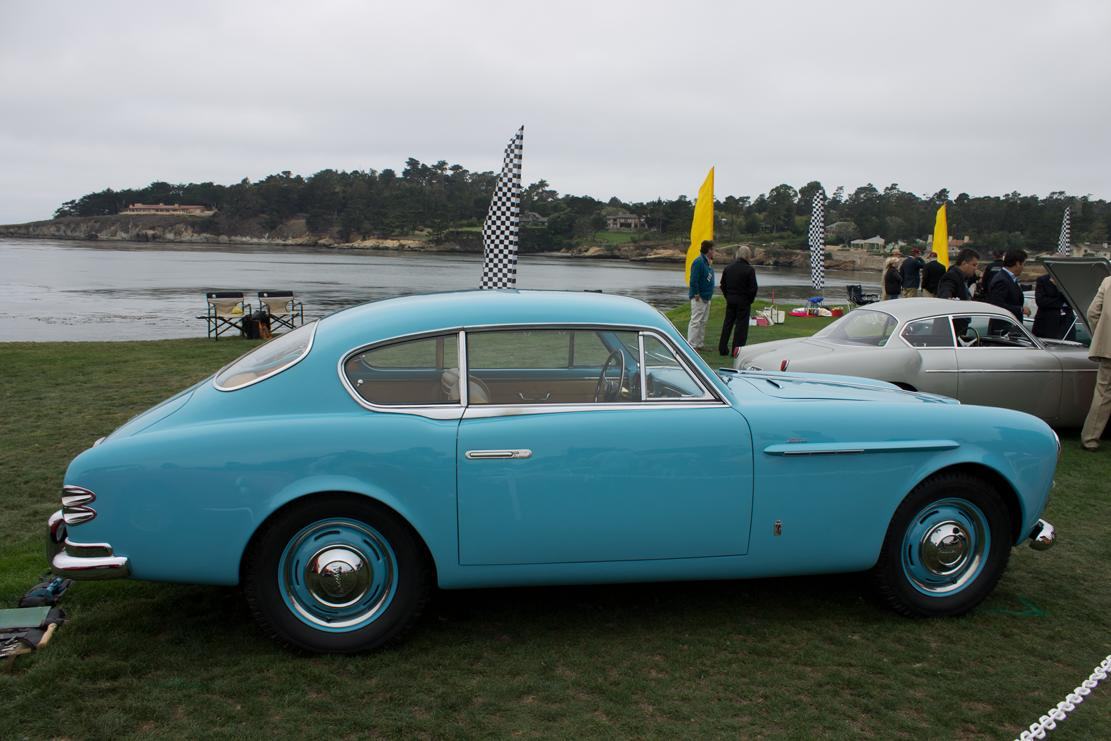
- A6G 2000 Pinin Farina

Overview
- Also called: 2000 Gran Turismo
- Production: 1950–1951; 16 produced

Powertrain
- Engine: 2.0 L SOHC I6
- Transmission: 4-speed manual

The improved A6G 2000 (officially 2000 Gran Turismo) began to replace the A6 1500 from 1950. The A6 engine was enlarged to 2 litres (1,954.3 cc) with a bore and stroke of 72 mm × 80 mm (2.83 in × 3.15 in); it retained the single overhead camshaft. Also thanks to triple carburettors, output was between 90 and 100 hp (66 and 74 kW) and top speeds ranged from 160 to 180 km/h (99 to 112 mph). The chassis retained the same measurements of the A6 1500, but the rear axle was now sprung on semi elliptic leaf springs.

The model debuted at the 1950 Turin Motor Show, wearing Pinin Farina coachwork. Just sixteen cars were built, all between 1950 and 1951. Nine received 2+2 fastback bodies by Pinin Farina; Frua built five convertibles and one coupé; lastly one got Vignale coupé bodywork designed by Giovanni Michelotti.

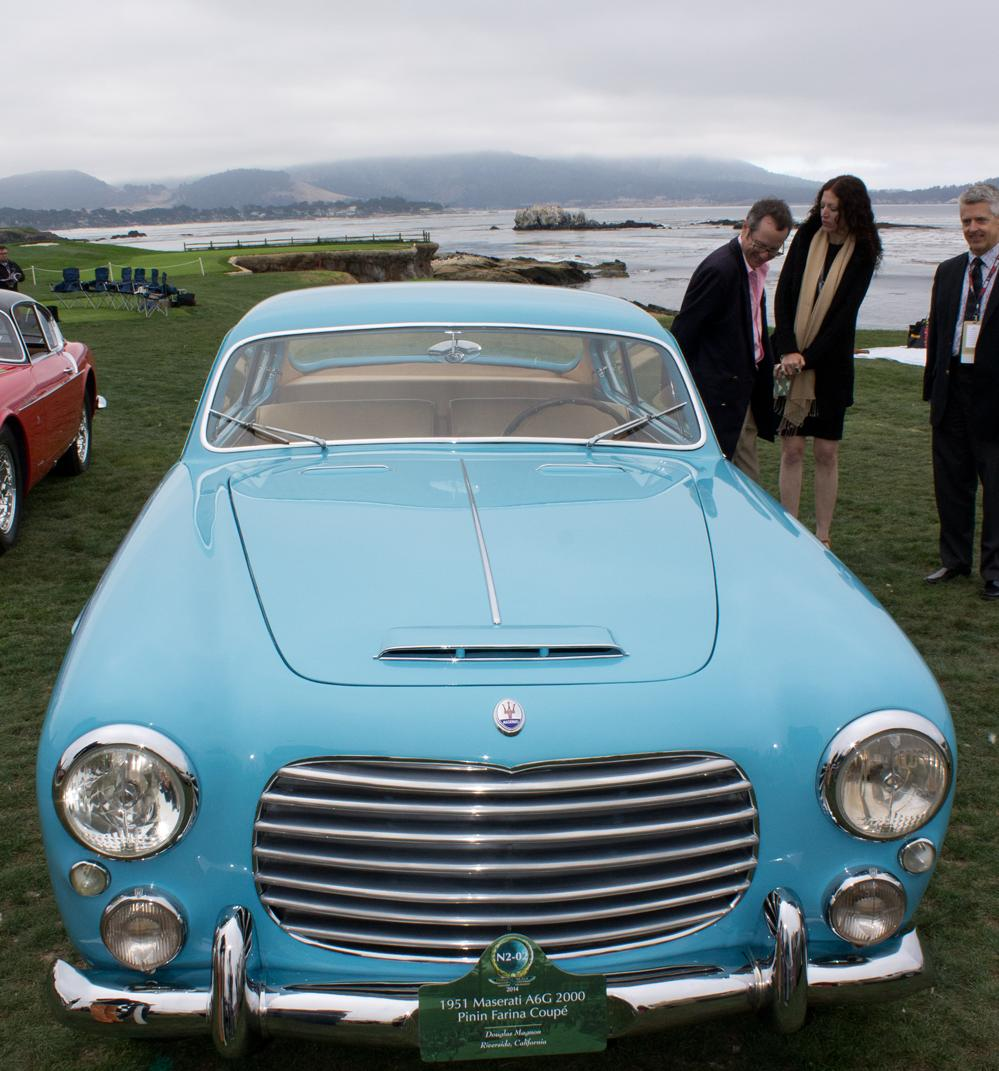
1951 A6G 2000 Pinin Farina

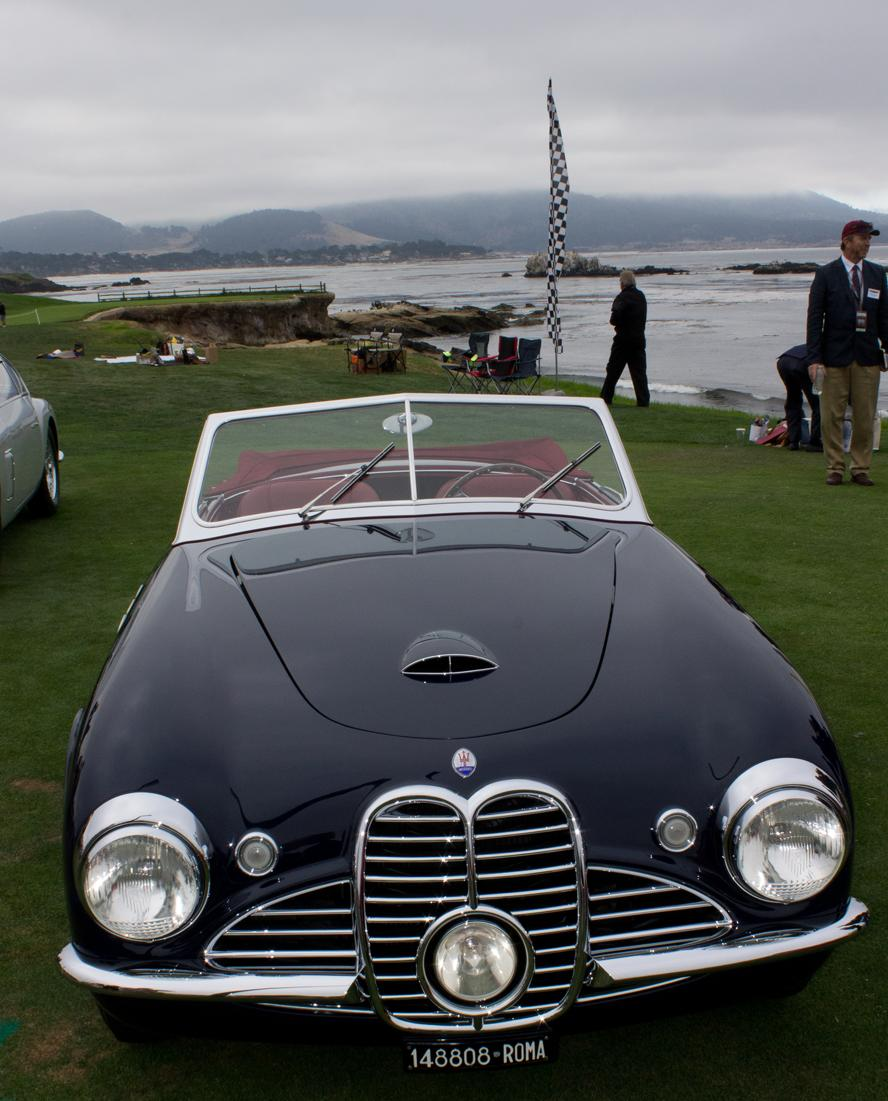
1951 A6G 2000 Frua Spyder

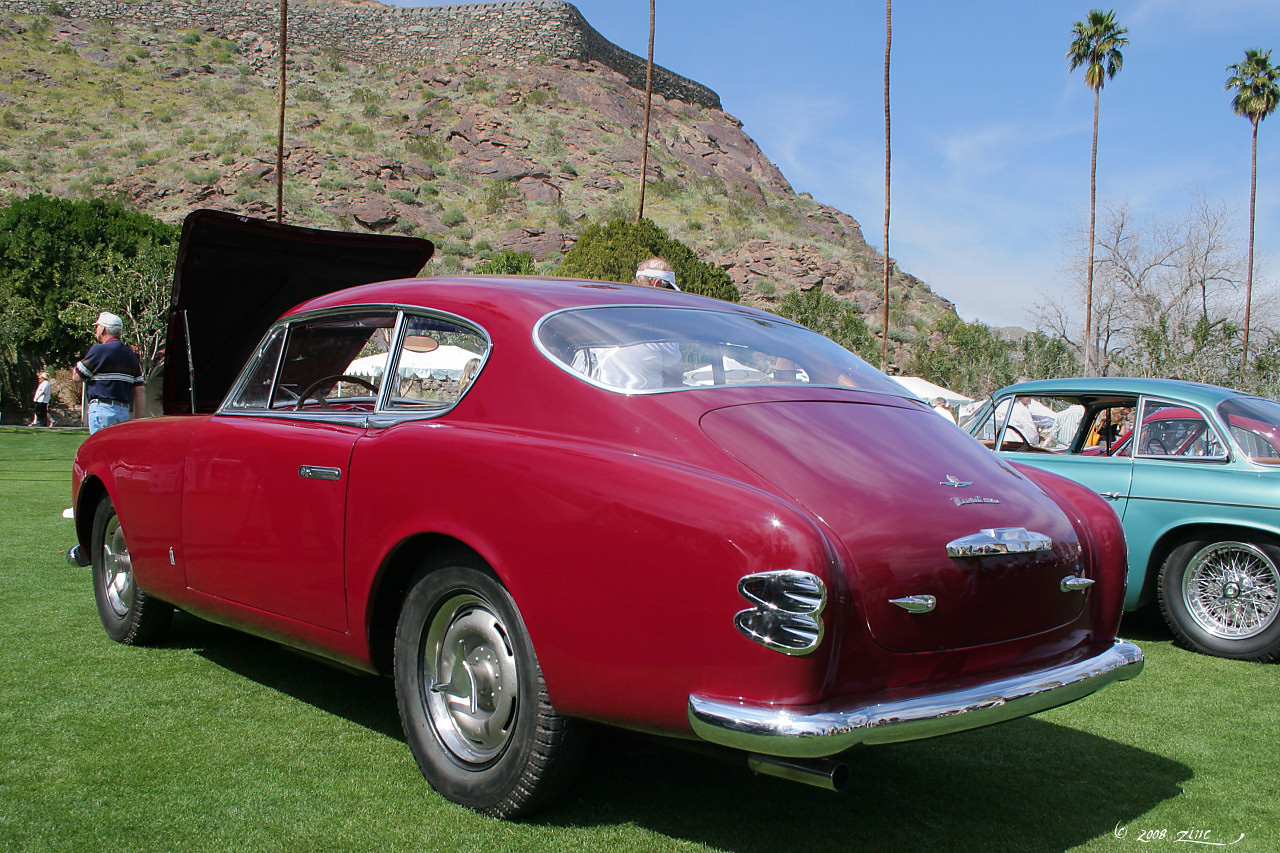
1951 A6G 2000 Pinin Farina, rear view

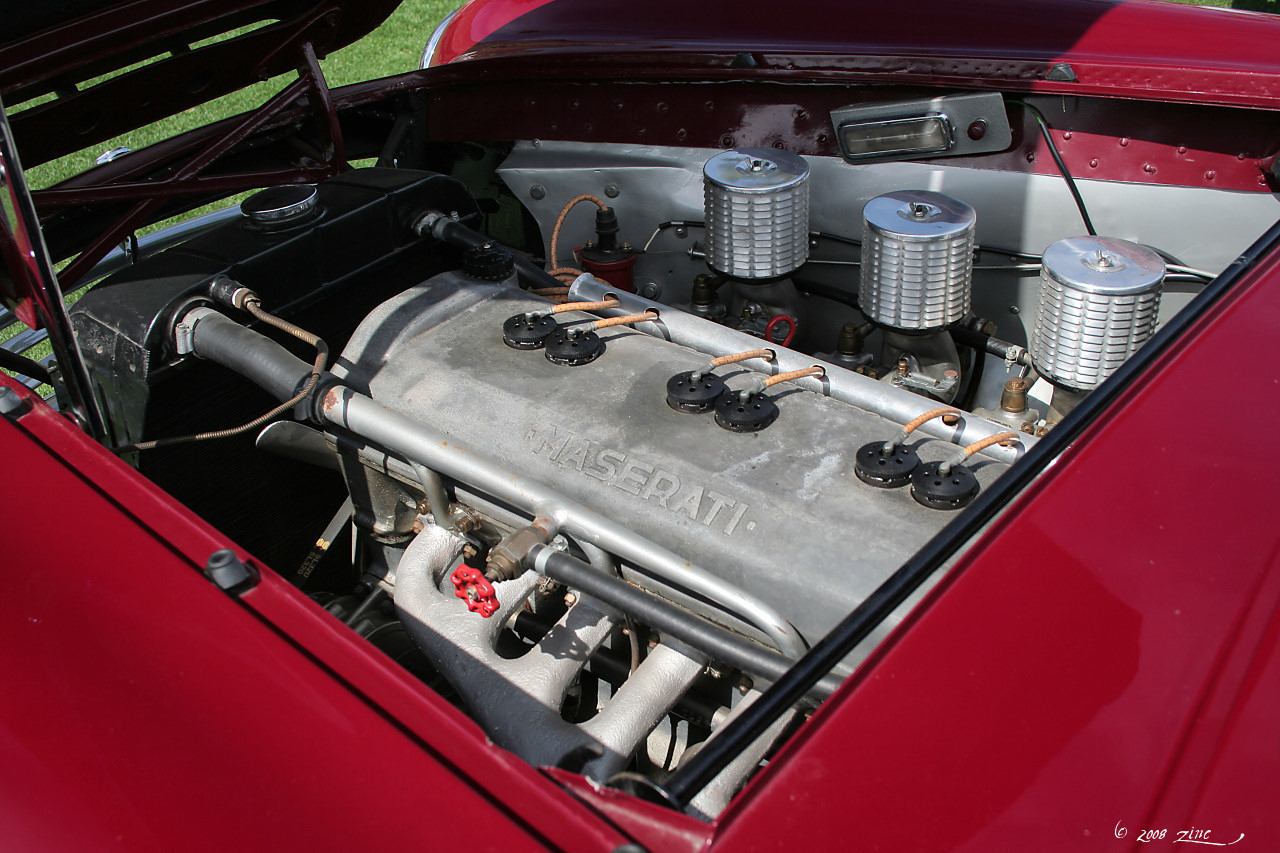
A6G 2000 engine

== A6GCM ==
Maserati A6GCM (1951–53) were twelve 2-litre single-seater («M» for monoposto) racing cars, developed by Gioacchino Colombo and built by Medardo Fantuzzi. Their engines developed between 160 and 190 PS (118 and 140 kW) depending on the state of tune. The A6 SSG (1953) was a GCM-revision pointing to the Maserati 250F. It won the 1953 Italian Grand Prix driven by Juan Manuel Fangio.

== A6GCS/53 ==
Maserati A6GCS/53
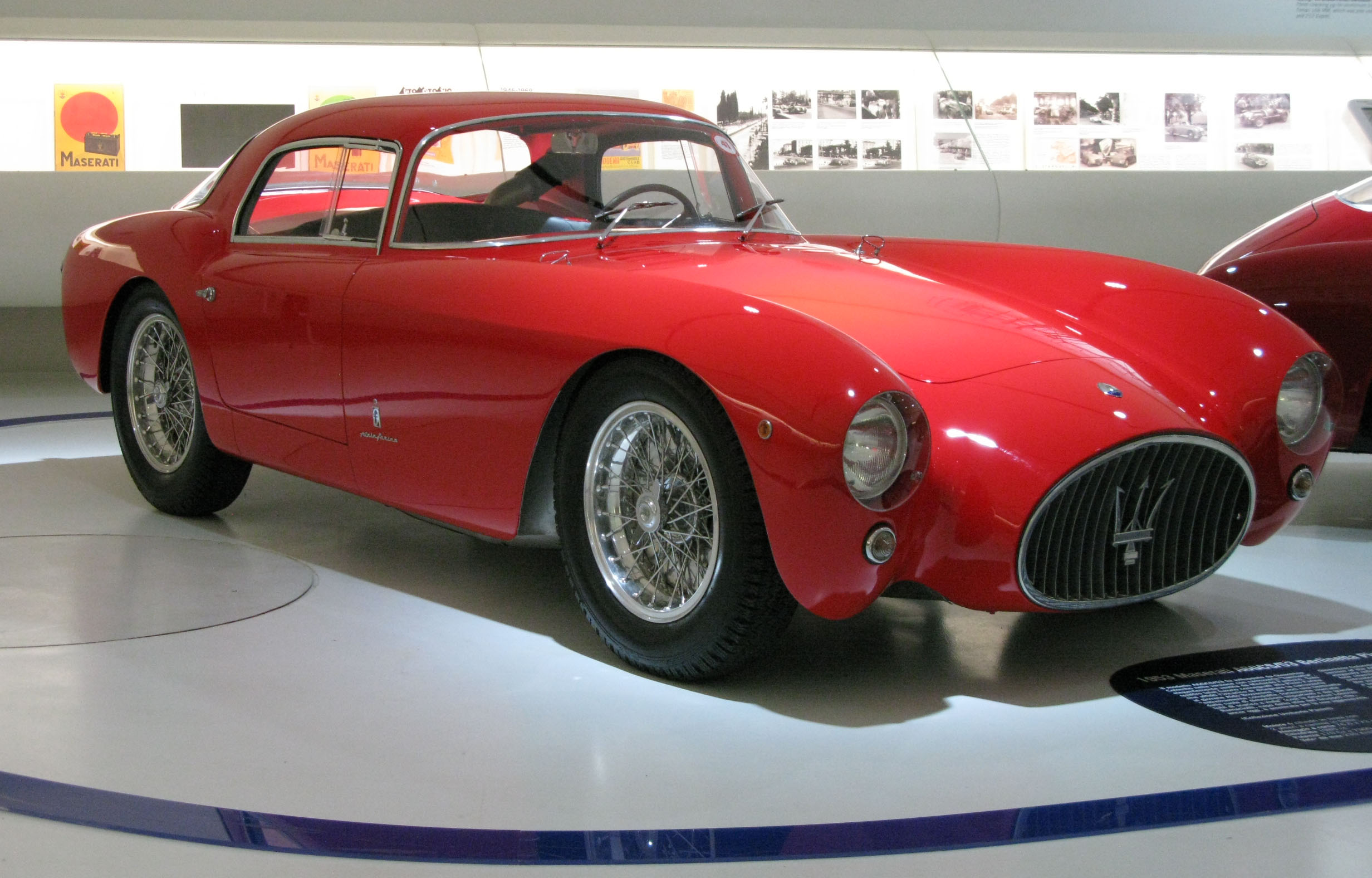
- 1953 A6GCS/53 Pinin Farina Berlinetta

Overview
- Production: 1953–1955; 52 produced

To compete in the World Sportscar Championship, the A6GCS/53 was developed in 1953. The engine was improved to produce 170 hp (125 kW; 168 bhp). A6GCS/53s were typically spiders, initially designed by Medardo Fantuzzi and then bodied either by Carrozzeria Fantuzzi or Celestino Fiandri of Carrozzeria Fiandri e Malagoli. Fifty-two were made. That number includes four berlinettas designed by Aldo Brovarone at Pinin Farina and one spider, their final design of a Maserati for the next five decades, on a commission by Rome dealer Guglielmo Dei who had acquired six chassis. Vignale also made one spider. In 1955, Guglielmo Dei bought two more chassis, numbers 2109 and 2110, and employed Carrozzeria Frua to create two open-top models. Those cars received A6G/54-sourced engines with racing modifications like a dry sump lubrication.

This car won the Polyphony Digital Award (an award given by Kazunori Yamauchi, creator of Gran Turismo game series) at the Pebble Beach Concours d'Elegance in 2014.

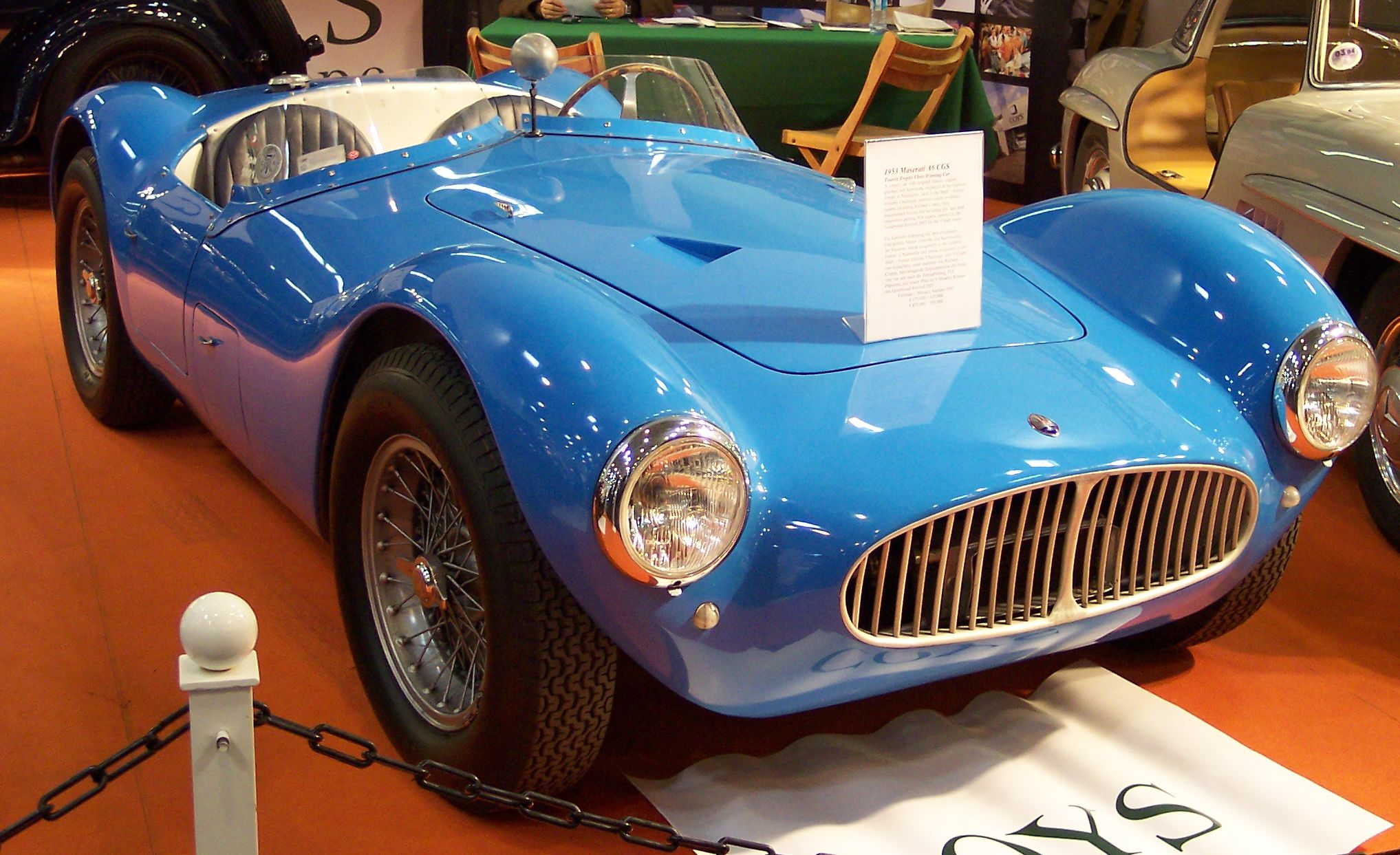
1953 A6GCS/53 spider-bodied by Fantuzzi

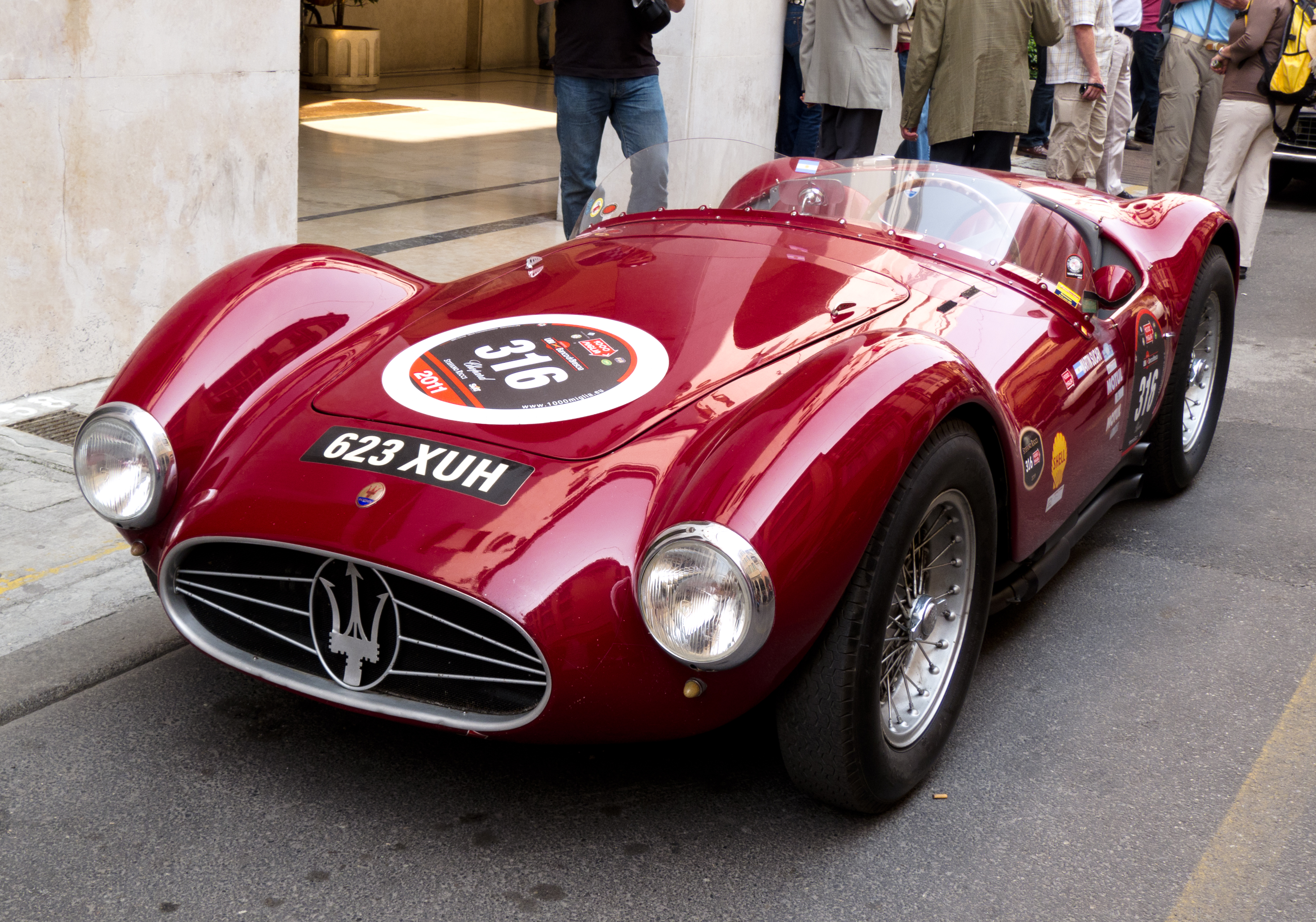
1954 Maserati A6GCS (Fantuzzi) at the 2011 Mille Miglia

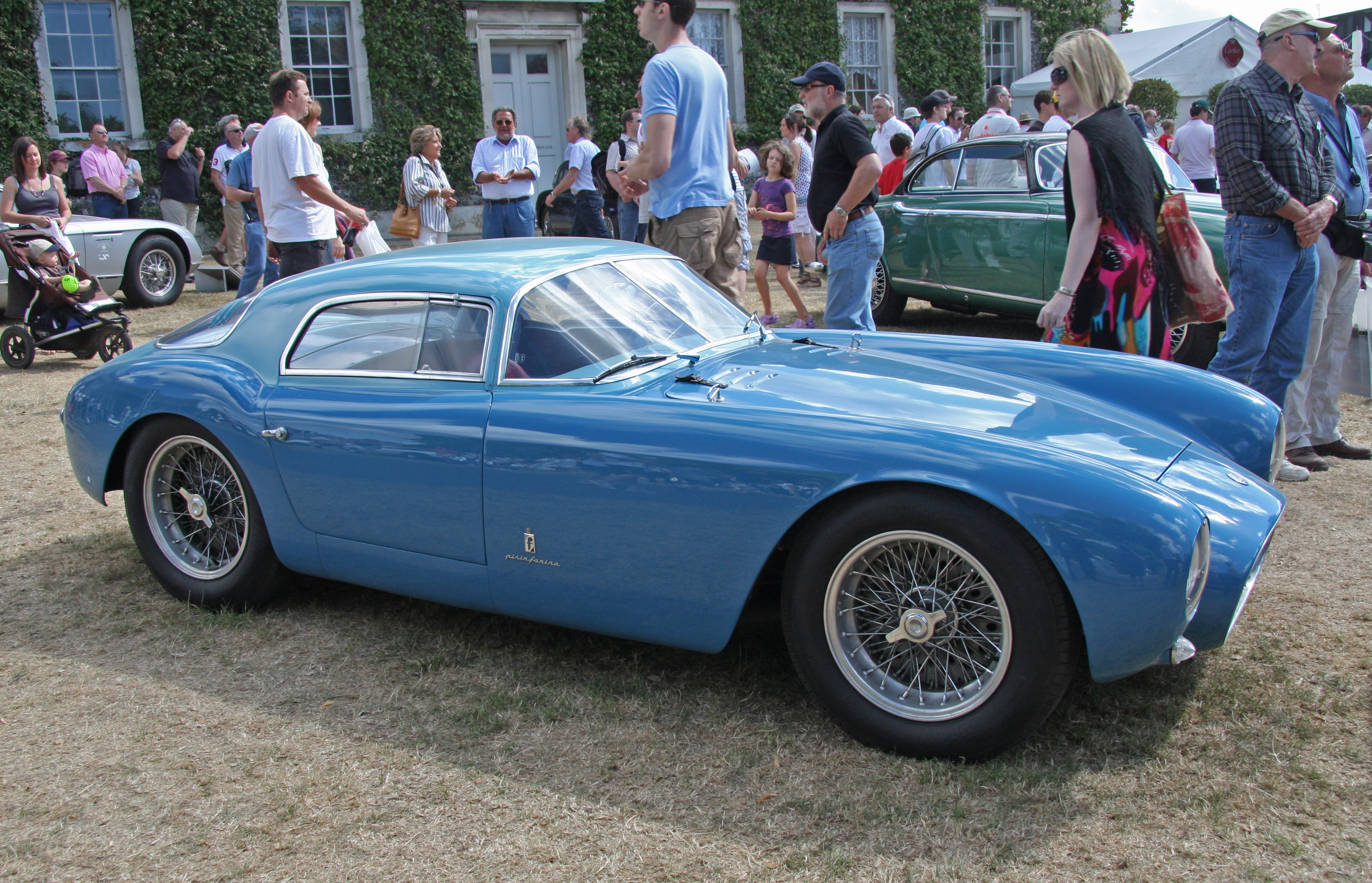
1954 Maserati A6GCS Berlinetta at the Goodwood Festival of Speed

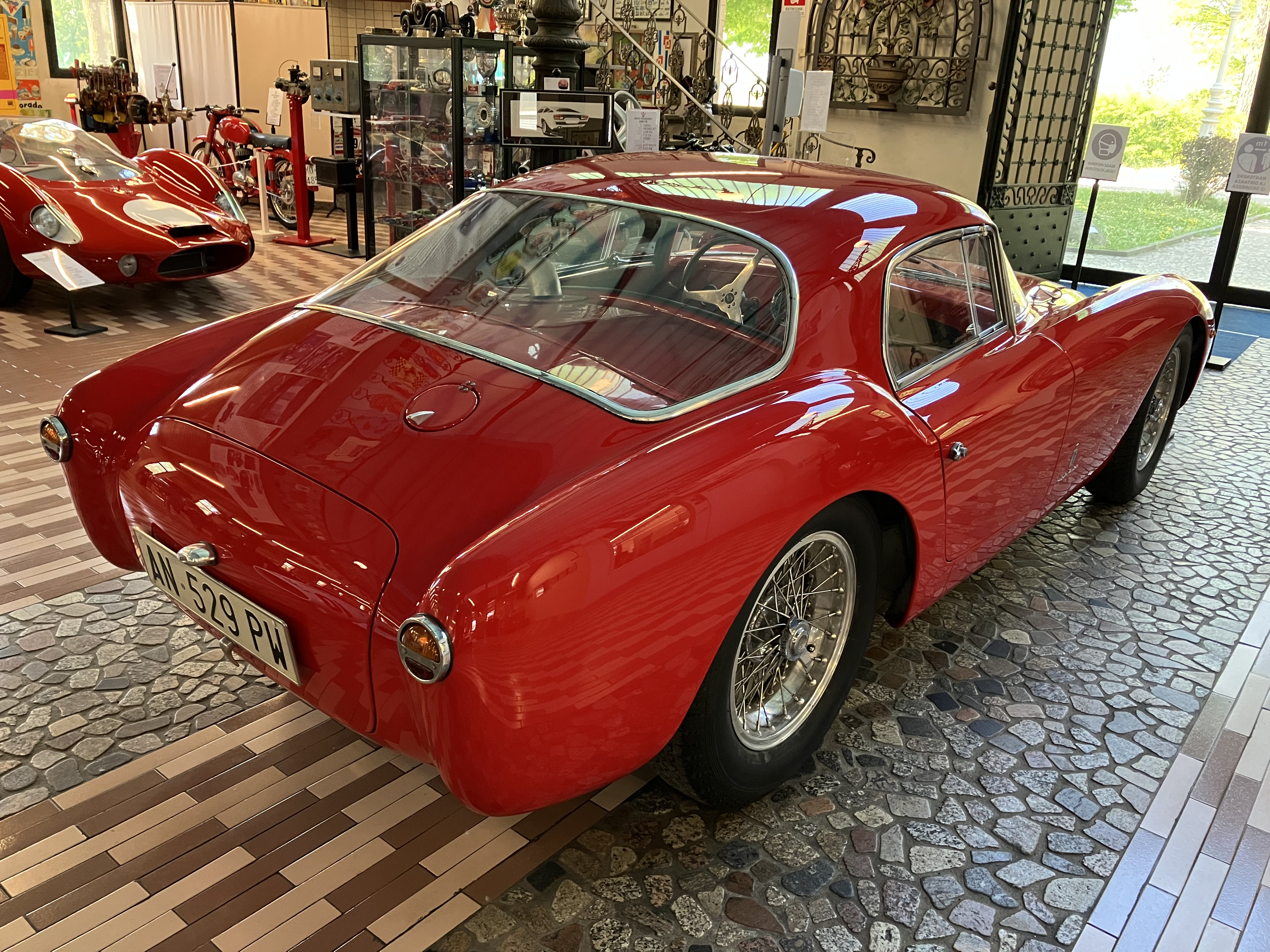
Rear view of a Pinin Farina-bodied Berlinetta at the Umberto Panini museum

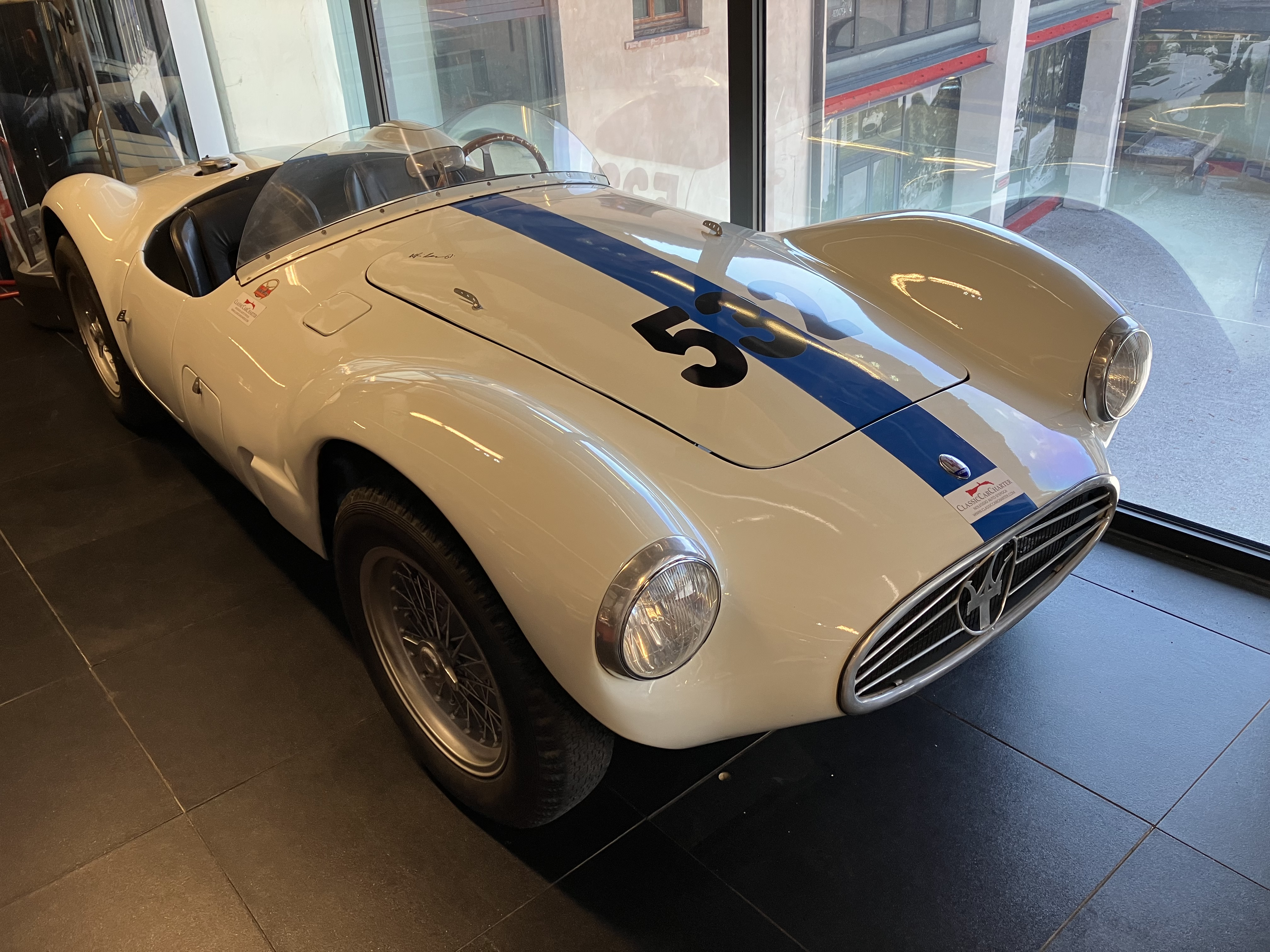
A6GCS/53 Spider at the Museo Mille Miglia

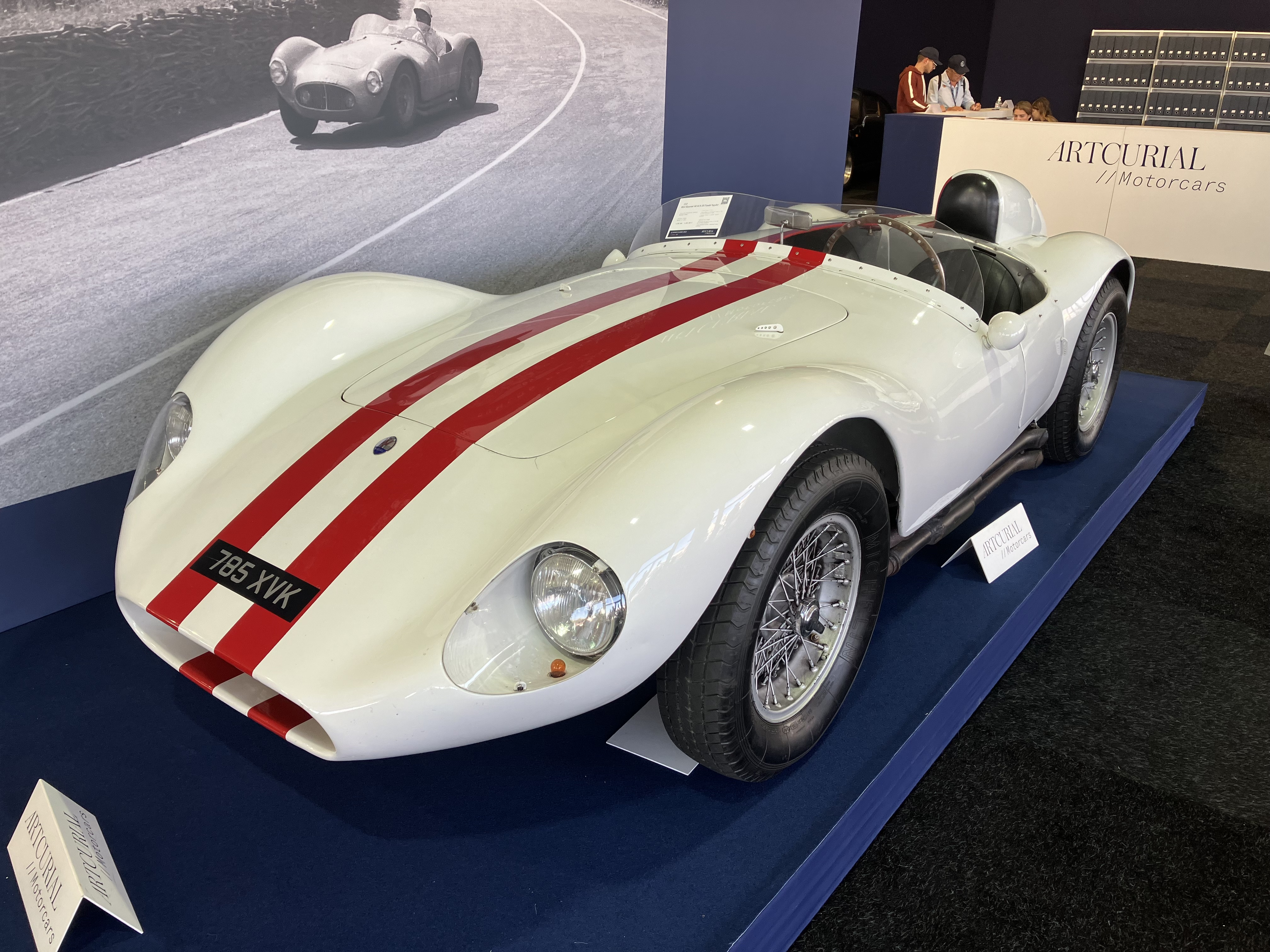
A6GCS/53 Fiandri Spyder at the 2022 Le Mans Classic

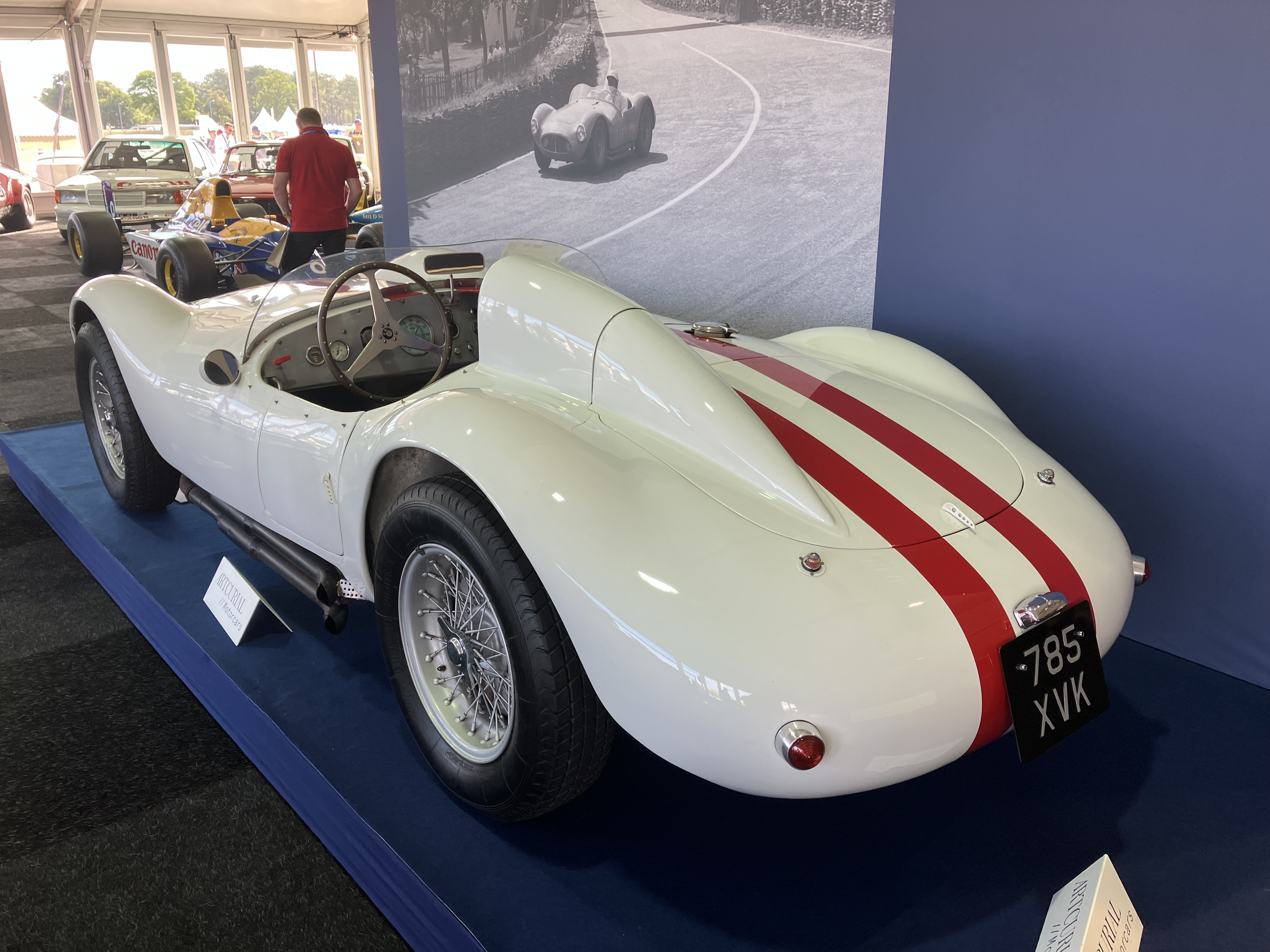
Rear view of the A6GCS/53 Fiandri Spyder

== A6G/54 ==
Maserati A6G/54 2000
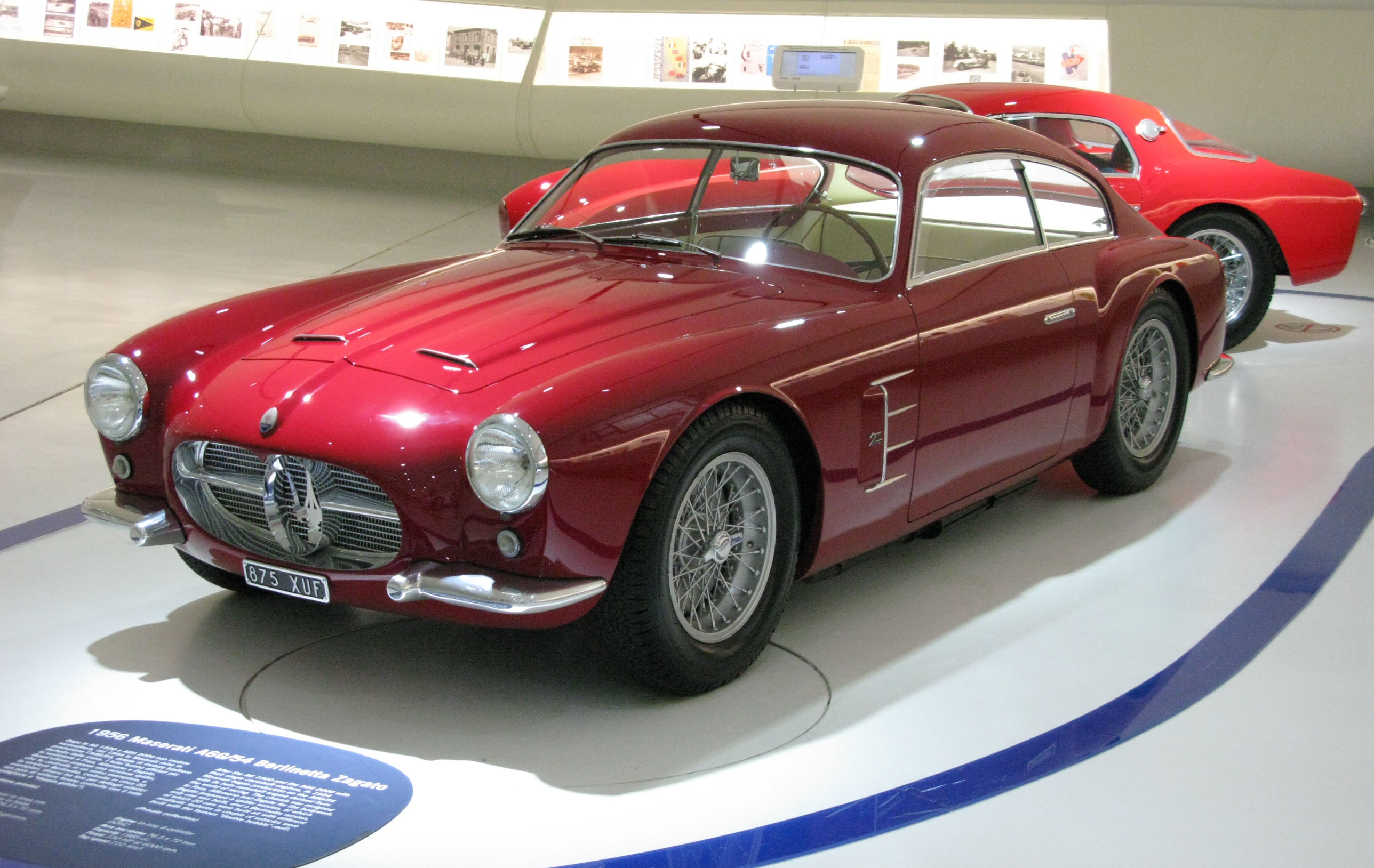
- 1956 A6G/54 Zagato

Overview
- Manufacturer: Maserati
- Production: 1954–1956; 60 produced

Powertrain
- Engine: 2.0 L DOHC I6
- Transmission: 4-speed manual

After a two-year hiatus at the 1954 Mondial de l'Automobile in Paris Maserati launched a new grand tourer, the A6G 2000 Gran Turismo—commonly known as A6G/54 to distinguish it from its predecessor. It was powered by a new double overhead camshaft inline-six, derived from the racing engines of A6GCS and A6GCM, with a bore and stroke of 76.5 mm x 72 mm for a total displacement of 1,985.6 cc (2.0 L). Fed by three twin-choke Weber DCO carburettors it put out 150 hp (110 kW; 148 bhp) at 6000 rpm, which gave these cars a top speed between 195 and 210 km/h (121 and 130 mph). Dual ignition was added in 1956 and increased power to 160 hp (118 kW; 158 bhp).

Total production between 1954 and 1956 amounted to 60 units. Four body styles were offered: a three-box Carrozzeria Allemano coupé (21 made, designed by Michelotti), a coupé and a Gran Sport Spyder by Frua (respectively 6 and 12 made); and a competition-oriented fastback by Zagato (20 made) as well as a single Zagato spider, chassis 2101, shown at Geneva in 1955. The Zagato Spider was purchased by Juan Perón, but his regime came to an end before Zagato could finish his ordered revisions and the car was stored by Maserati. After being shown at Paris in 1958, it was sold to an American residing there. An A6G/54 Zagato chassis 2155 received a unique coupé bodystyle, after being crashed on a test drive by Gianni Zagato. Distinguished by non-fastback rear-end and 'eyelids' over the headlights. It is also one of only two with a 'double bubble' roof.

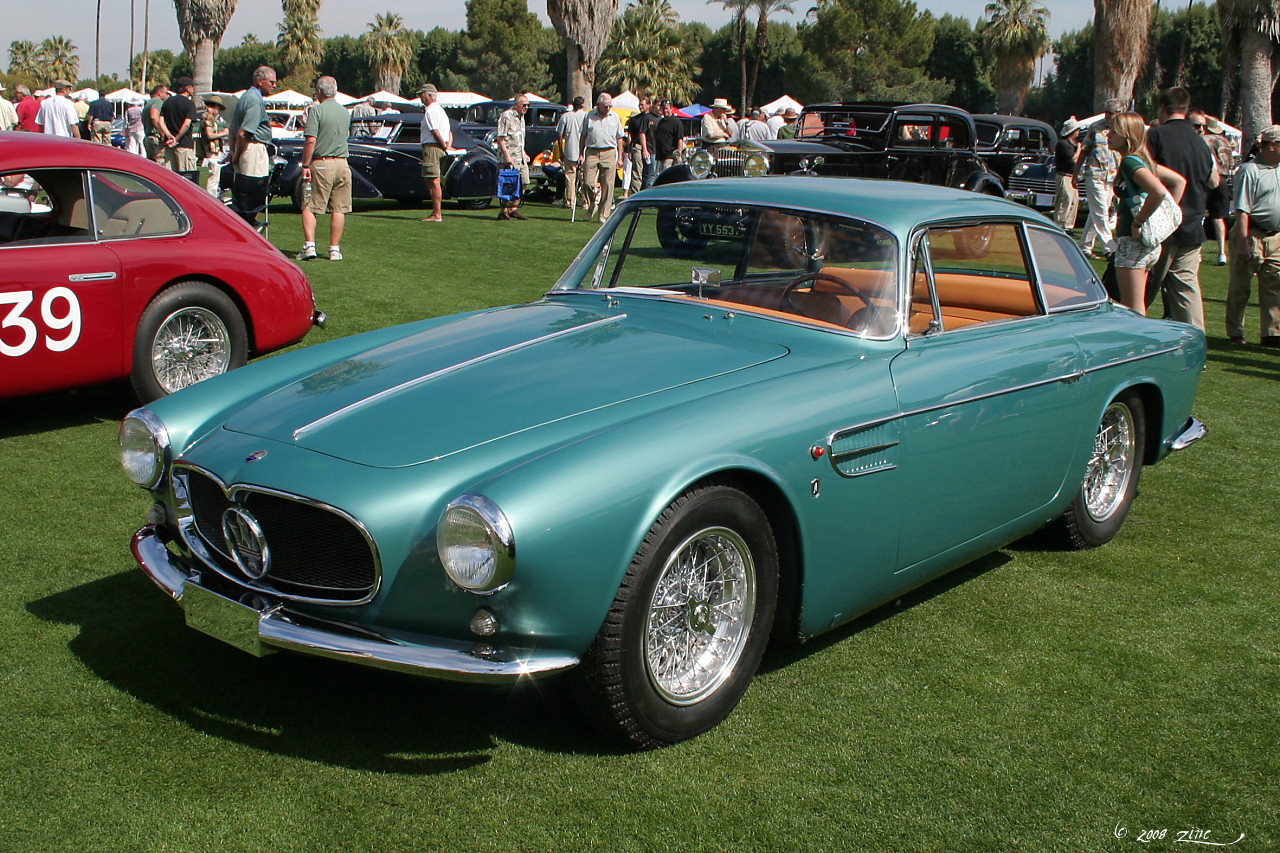
1956 A6G/54 Allemano coupé

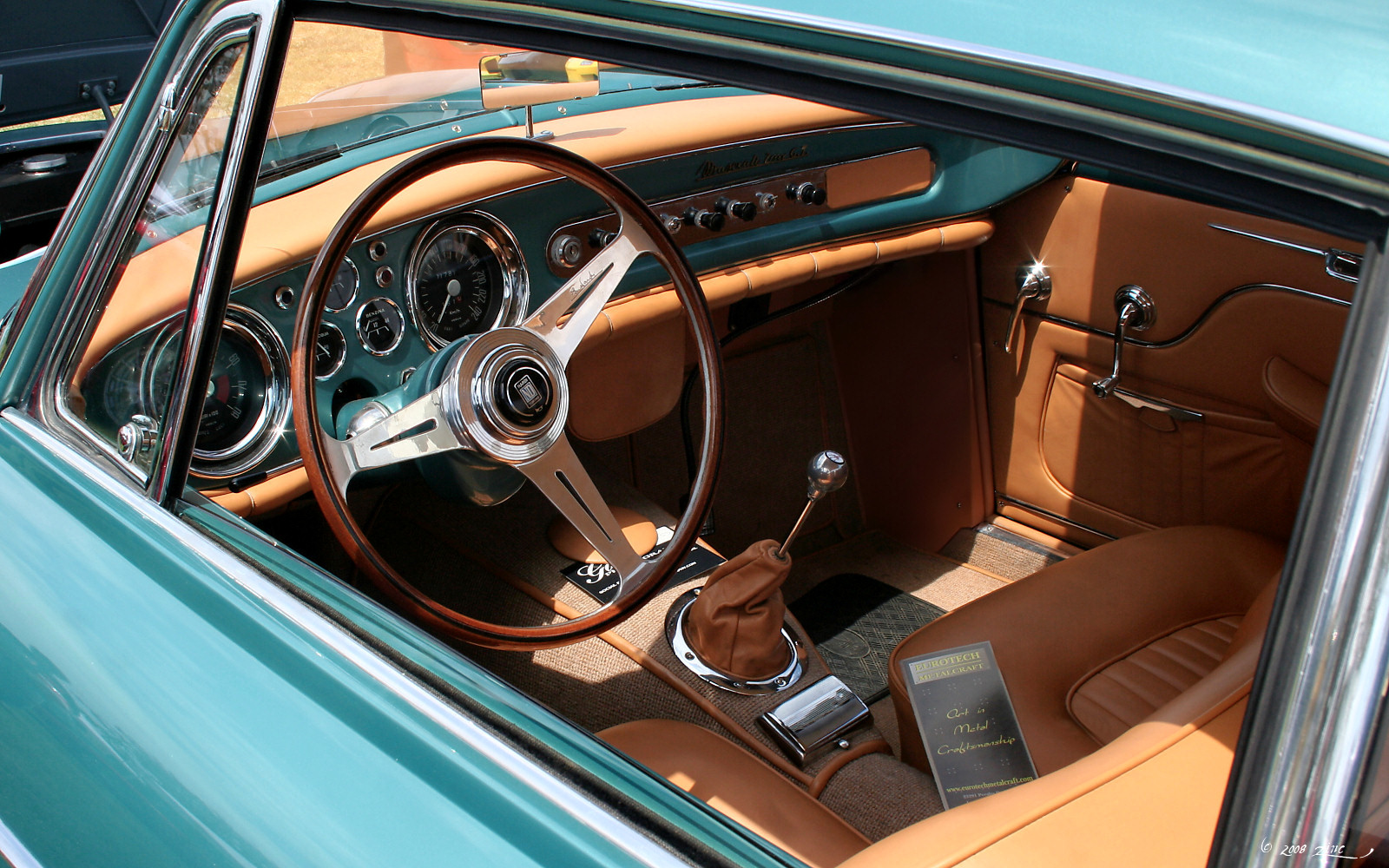
1956 A6G/54 Allemano coupé interior

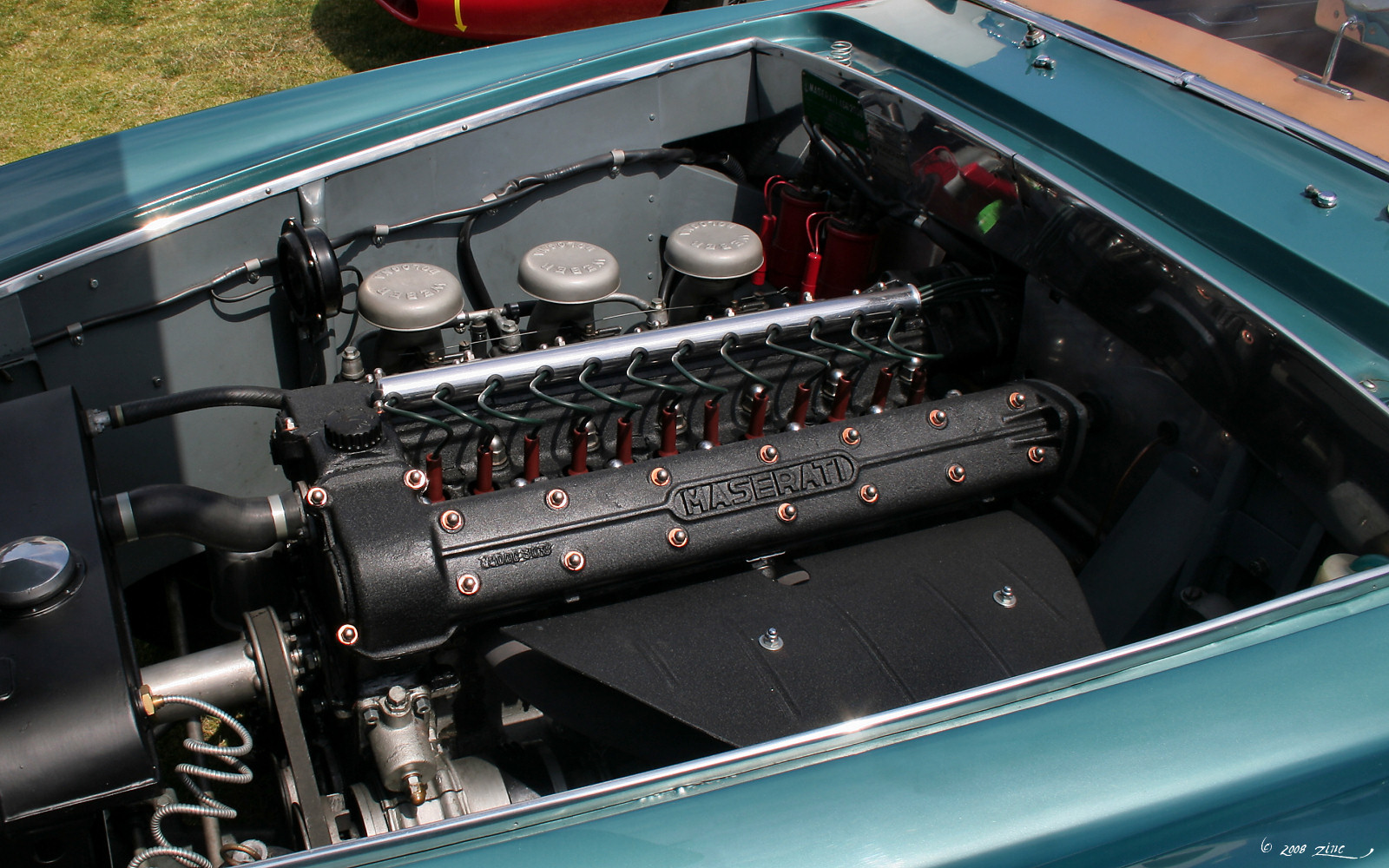
The engine from the same car, showing dual ignition.

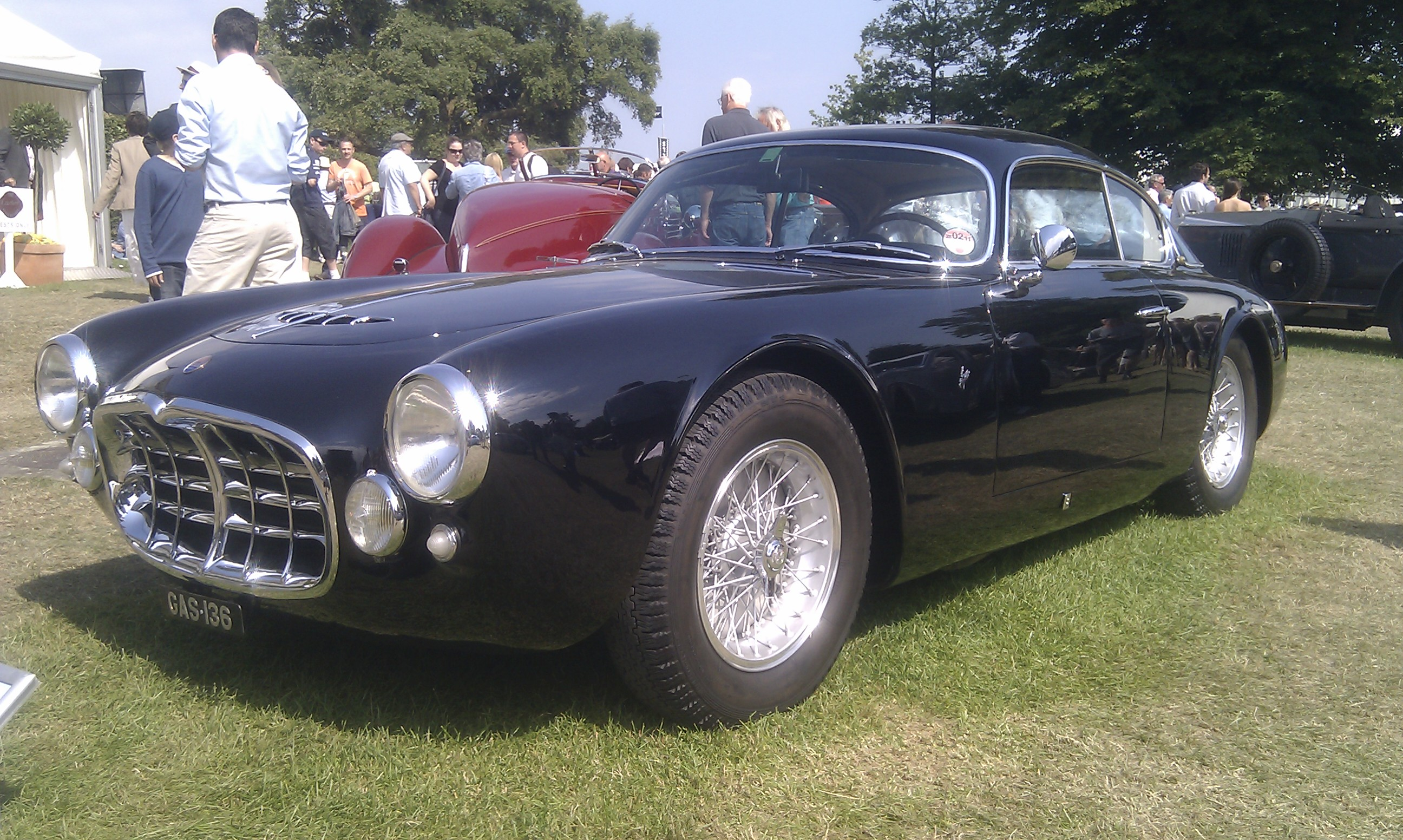
1955 A6G/54 with Frua coupé coachwork

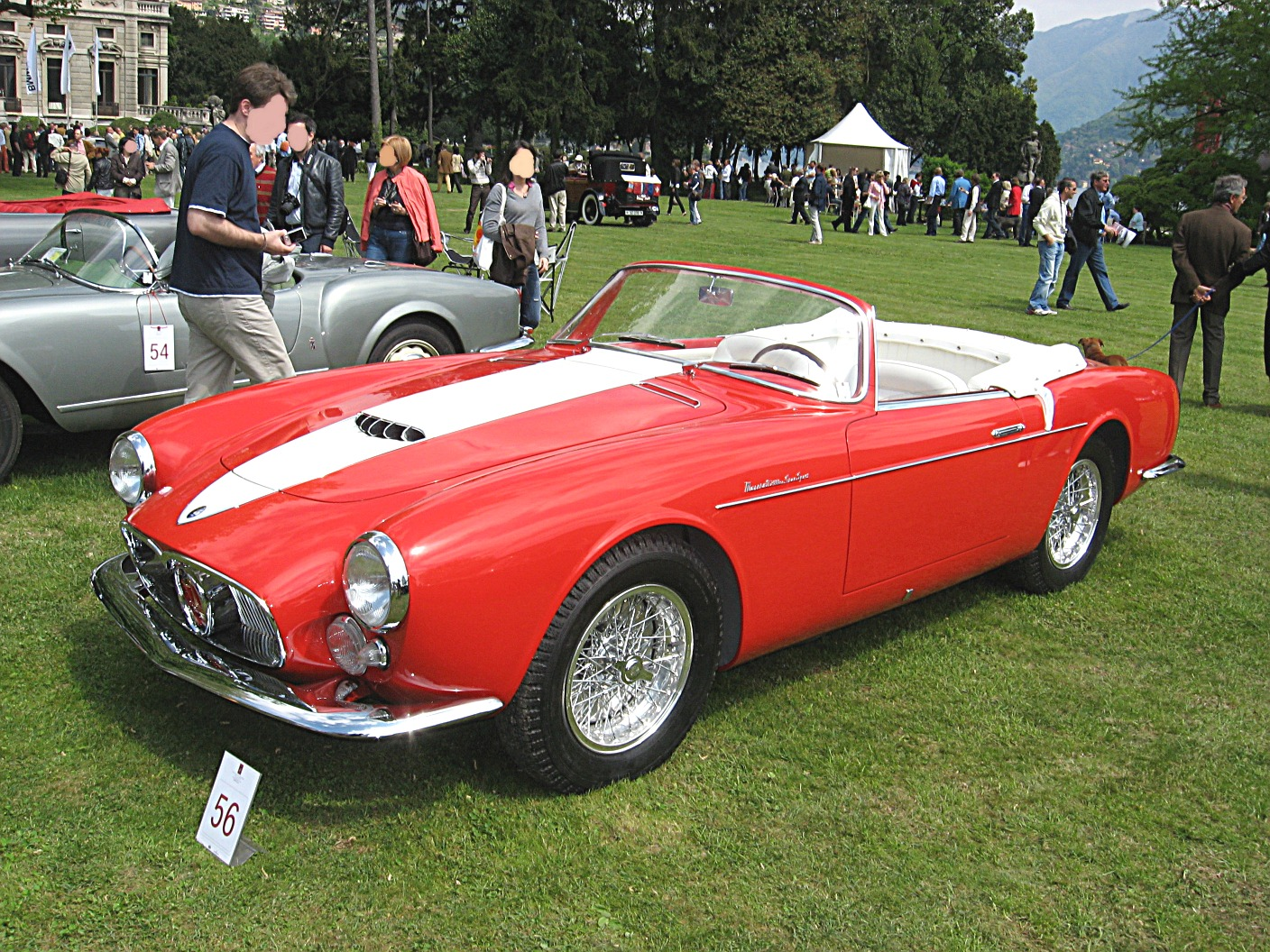
1956 A6G/54 Gran Sport Frua Spyder

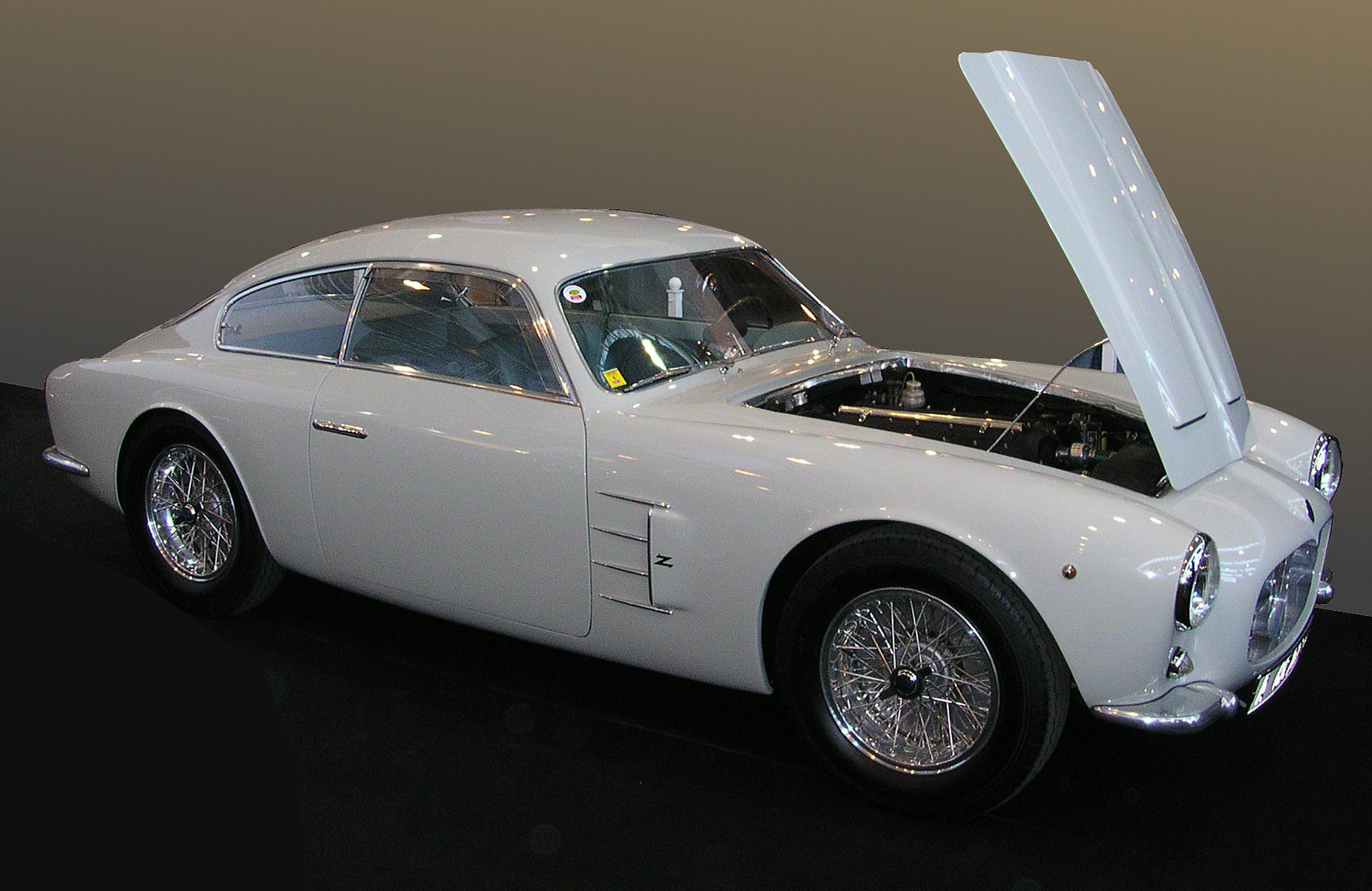
1956 A6G/54 Zagato
