= Maserati Tipo 26B =

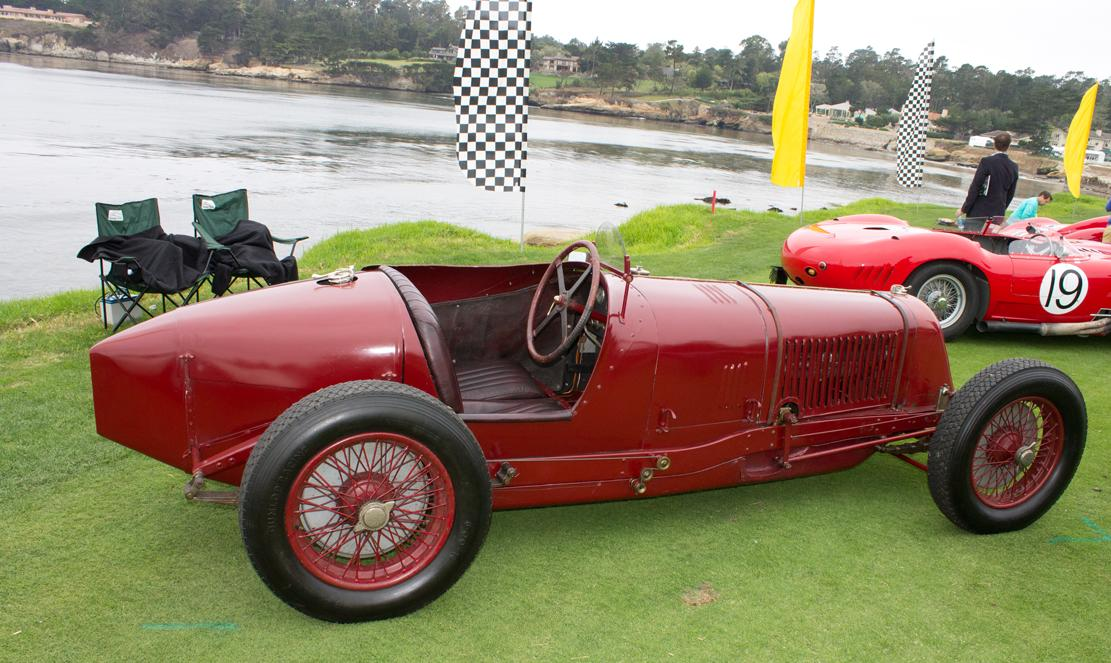
- 1928 Maserati Tipo 26B Monoposto (chassis no. 33/2515)

Overview
- Manufacturer: Maserati
- Production: 1927-1930
- Assembly: Bologna, Italy
- Designer: Alfieri Maserati

Body and chassis
- Class: Race car
- Layout: FR layout
- Related: Tipo 26B MM

Powertrain
- Engine: 2.0 litre supercharged I8
- Transmission: 4-speed manual

Dimensions
- Wheelbase: 2,650 mm (104 in) (2,580 mm (102 in) since 1928)
- Curb weight: 720-780 kg

Chronology
- Predecessor: Maserati Tipo 26
- Successor: Maserati Tipo 26M; Maserati Tipo V4

The Maserati Tipo 26B or Maserati Tipo 26B Monoposto was a racing car built by Italian manufacturer Maserati between 1927 and 1930, in a total of six examples and one additional engine.

It was closely derived from the Tipo 26 with the same steel ladder-type frame and a similar aluminum two-seater bodywork. The main difference was in the straight-eight engine being enlarged to 2 litres, otherwise it still featured a crankshaft-driven Roots supercharger, twin gear-driven overhead camshafts and dry sump lubrication. The Tipo 26's 1492.9 cc engine had its bore and stroke upped by 2 and 16 mm, respectively, increasing displacement to 1980.5 cc. The engine's dimensions were now 62 by 82 mm. Two engines were bored out further, to 2.1 litres.

The Tipo 26B was conceived primarily for open road racing since its engine didn't comply with the 1926-1927 Grand Prix formula which required a maximum displacement of 1.5 litres.

At its debut race in the 1927 Targa Florio the Maserati Tipo 26B driven by Alfieri Maserati finished third overall.

A Tipo 26B was classified 12th in the 1930 Indianapolis 500 race, driven by Letterio Cucinotta of Messina.

== Tipo 26B MM ==
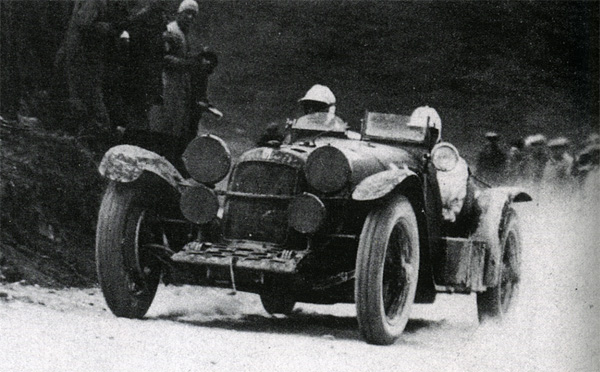
Aymo Maggi and Ernesto Maserati in Tipo 26B MM at Mille Miglia on 1 April 1928.

For the 1928 Mille Miglia endurance race, a new chassis received the same treatment as the Tipo 26 MM being fitted with a roadster body. The coachwork featured cycle wings, running boards, doors, headlights, a small windshield, a folding canvas top and two spare wheels mounted on the tail. Under the hood the engine was the same as found in the Tipo 26B. Three other chassis were built between 1929 and 1930. Those cars were known as Tipo 26B MM.
