= Maserati Tipo 26 =

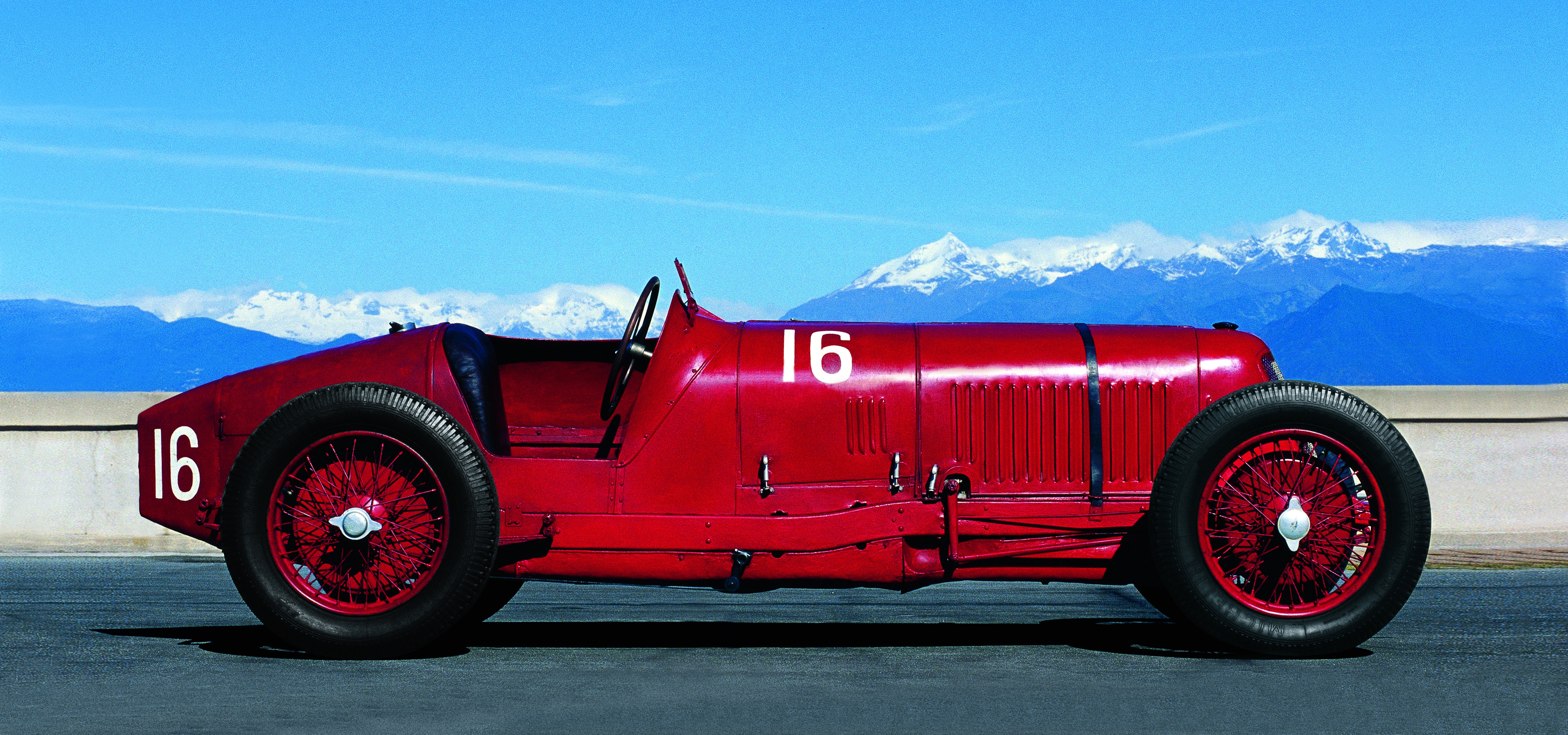

Overview
- Manufacturer: Maserati
- Production: 1926-1932
- Assembly: Bologna, Italy
- Designer: Alfieri Maserati

Body and chassis
- Class: Race car
- Layout: FR layout
- Related: Maserati Tipo 26B

Powertrain
- Engine: 1.5 L s/c I8
- Transmission: 3-speed manual (4-speed since 1927)

Dimensions
- Wheelbase: 2,650 mm (104 in) (2,580 mm (102 in) since 1928)
- Curb weight: 720-780 kg

Chronology
- Successor: Maserati 4CM

The Maserati Tipo 26 was a model of Grand Prix racing car and was the first car built by Italian manufacturer Maserati, for a total of 11 examples, between 1926 and 1932.

The Tipo 26 originated from a Grand Prix car that Alfieri Maserati had designed for Diatto: when the collaboration between Maserati and Diatto ended, Alfieri took his design to the Bologna workshop that he had set up with his brothers in 1914.

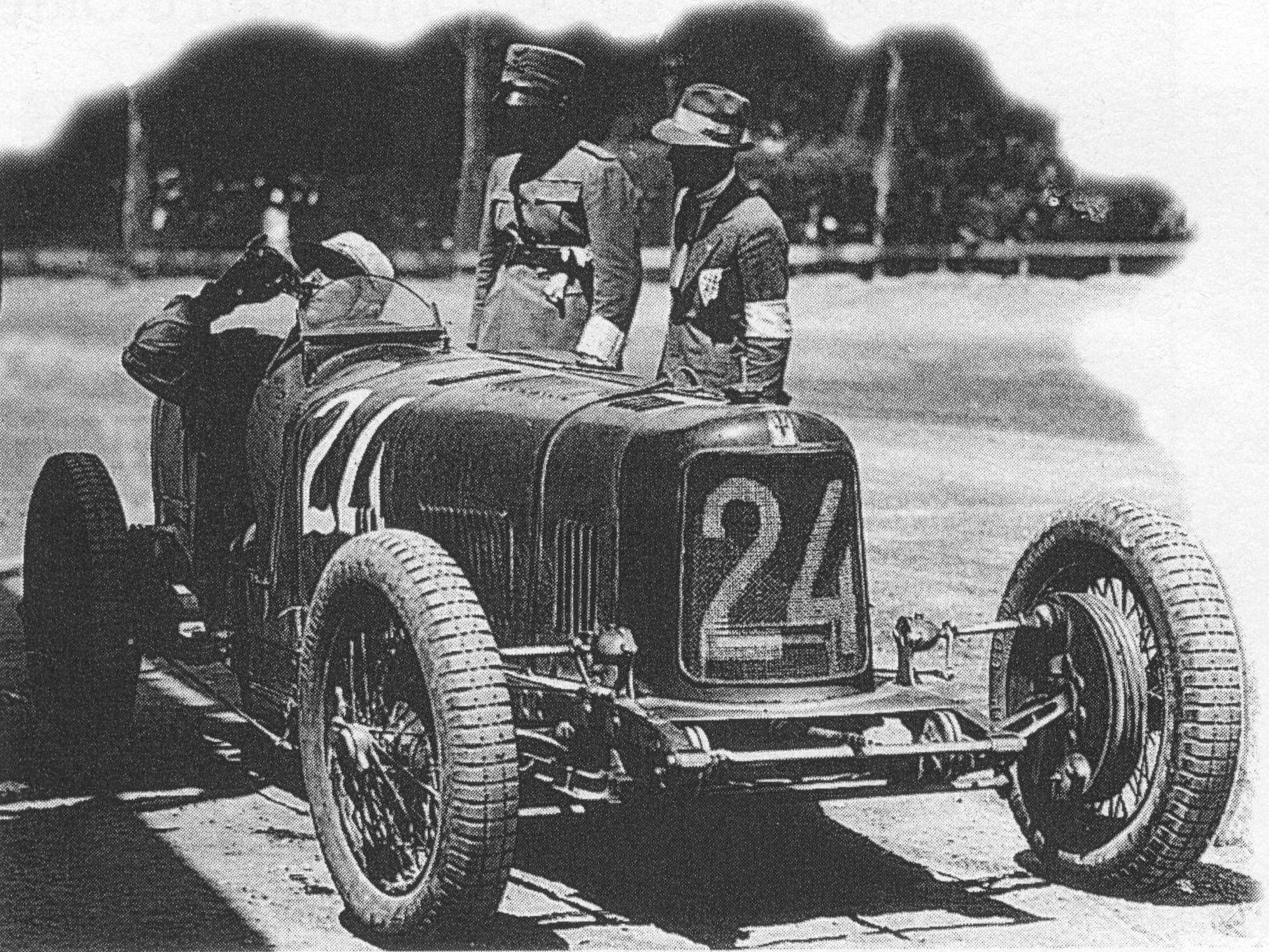
A Tipo 26 at Circuito di Bologna on 19 June 1927.

The design of the Tipo 26 consisted of a steel ladder-type frame supporting a supercharged inline-eight engine displacing 1.5 L (1,492.9 cc), with a bore and stroke of 60 mm × 66 mm (2.36 in × 2.60 in), with a three-speed manual transmission and aluminium two-seater bodywork made by Medardo Fantuzzi.

The engine featured a crankshaft-driven Roots supercharger, twin gear-driven overhead camshafts and dry sump lubrication; to comply with the 1926 Grand Prix regulations the displacement was fixed to 1.5-litres.

At its debut race in the 1926 Targa Florio, the Maserati Tipo 26, with Alfieri Maserati driving and a young Guerino Bertocchi as riding mechanic, finished first in the Grand Prix class and ninth overall.

== Tipo 26 MM ==
For the 1928 Mille Miglia endurance race, two new chassis were fitted with roadster bodies featuring cycle wings, running boards, doors, headlights, a small windshield, a folding canvas top and two spare wheels mounted on the tail. Under the hood the engines were the same as found in the Tipo 26 Grand Prix. Those cars were known as Tipo 26 MM.

== Technical Data ==
Tipo 26	T26	T26B	T26R	T26C	T26M
Engine:	Front mounted 8-cylinder in-line engine
displacement:	1493 cm³	1981 cm³	1691 cm³	1079 cm³	2495 cm³
Bore x stroke:	60 x 66 mm	62 x 82 mm	62 x 70 mm	51 x 66 mm	65 x 94 mm
Max power at rpm:	120 hp at 5 300 rpm 128 hp at 6 000 rpm (from 1927)	155 hp at 5 300 rpm	140 hp at 6 500 rpm	105 hp at 6 000 rpm	185 hp at 5 600 rpm
Valve control:	2 overhead camshafts, 2 valves per cylinder
Compression:	5.8:1	5.6:1	5.5:1
Induction:	Roots compressor
Carburetor:	2 Memini	2 Memini (Weber from 1929)	1 Memini Super (Weber from 1929)	1 Weber ASS
Ignition:	Single, Bosch or Scintilla magneto
Cooling:	Water, centrifugal pump and radiator
Lubrication	Dry sump, pressurised, with delivery and scavenging pumps
Gearbox:	3-speed manual 4-speed manual (from 1927)	4-speed manual	3-speed manual	4-speed manual
Suspension :	Stiff axles, longitudinal leaf springs
Brakes:	Mechanical drum brakes
Chassis & body:	Box beam frame with aluminum body
Wheelbase:	265 cm	258 cm			275 cm
Dry weight:	780 kg	720 kg		800 kg	820 kg
Top speed:	200 km/h	210 km/h	200 km/h	185 km/h	235 km/h
