= Ettore Maserati =

Italian automotive engineer (1894–1990)

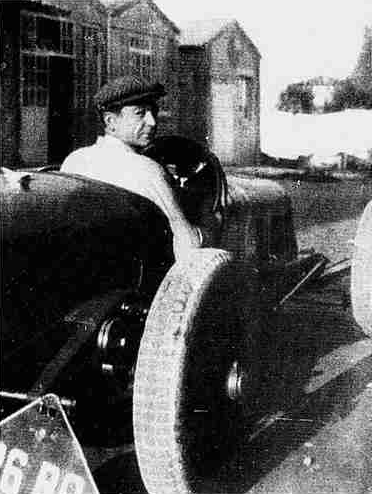
- Ettore Maserati in 1920s
- Born: 1894; Voghera, Italy
- Died: 4 August 1990 (aged 95–96)
- Occupation: automotive engineer
- Known for: one of five brothers who founded Maserati
- Relatives: Carlo Maserati, Bindo Maserati, Alfieri Maserati, Ernesto Maserati (brothers)

Ettore Maserati (1894 – 4 August 1990) was an Italian automotive engineer, one of five brothers who founded the Maserati firm in Bologna 1914. He was born in Voghera.

His oldest brother Carlo Maserati brought him to the Junior car manufacturer in 1908. After Carlo's death, his other brother Bindo Maserati brought Ettore and Alfieri Maserati to work for Isotta Fraschini, which also resulted in worldwide representation tours in the years before World War I. He also held an intermediate position with Franco Tosi meccanica as a leading engine engineer.

Between 1914 and 1938, he was in Bologna, involved in business affairs of the Maserati racing car manufacturer. The company was bought by Adolfo Orsi in 1937, and in 1940, Ettore and his brothers Ernesto Maserati and Bindo Maserati moved with the company to Modena. In 1947 they founded the O.S.C.A.-Maserati company in Bologna. He retired in 1966.
