= Carlo Maserati =

Italian bicycle and automotive engineer

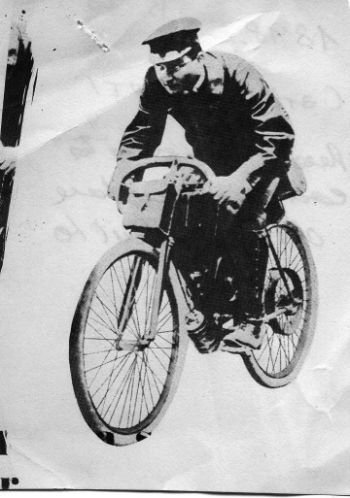
- Carlo Maserati on a velocipede.
- Born: 1881; Voghera, Italy
- Died: 1910 (aged 28–29)
- Occupation: Engineer
- Relatives: Maserati Brothers

Carlo Maserati (1881 in Voghera – 1910) was an Italian bicycle and automotive engineer, and the eldest of the Maserati Brothers.

His engineering career started in a bicycle factory in Affori, near Milan, where he developed a one-cylinder internal combustion engine for motorized bicycles. The engine went into production at Marquis Michele Carcano di Anzano del Parcos factory, using a leather strap as a transmission. Carlo was engaged as a racer of these bicycles, winning the Brescia-Orzinuovi in 1899, and the Brescia-Cremona-Mantua-Verona-Brescia and Padova-Bovolenta in 1900.

Carcano's factory was closed in 1901. Carlo went to work as a test driver for Fiat between 1901 and 1903, then became a test driver and mechanic at Isotta Fraschini later that year, where he was joined by brother Alfieri Maserati. He moved to work on automobiles for Bianchi in 1907, where he raced the Coppa Florio, coming in 9th, and the Kaiserpreis, before becoming manager of the Junior car company in 1908. At Junior, he hired his brother Ettore Maserati. Carlo died of tuberculosis in 1910, with his brothers establishing Maserati in Bologna in 1914.
