= Alberto Massimino =

Italian automobile designer

Alberto Massimino (5 January 1895 – 27 November 1975) was an Italian automotive engineer.

== Biography ==
Born in Turin, he studied mechanical engineering in Switzerland and worked for FIAT (1924–28), where he followed Vittorio Jano who had left for Alfa Romeo. The 1500 cc, 12-cylinder 806/504 was driven by Pietro Bordino in the Gran Premio di Milano (1927). He also had a short stay at Alfa Romeo and Stabilimenti Farina before joining Scuderia Ferrari (1938–44), working on the 158 Alfetta with Gioacchino Colombo, as well as on the Auto Avio Costruzioni 815 (1940 Mille Miglia). At Maserati (1944–52) he was involved in the Maserati 4CLT, Maserati A6 (1946) and Maserati 250F (1952). He then worked for on shorter projects for Ferrari (the Jano V12 and Dino), Stanguellini, De Tomaso, Moretti and Scuderia Serenissima.

Massiminimo died at Modena in 1975.
