= Maserati brothers =

Italian car manufacturers

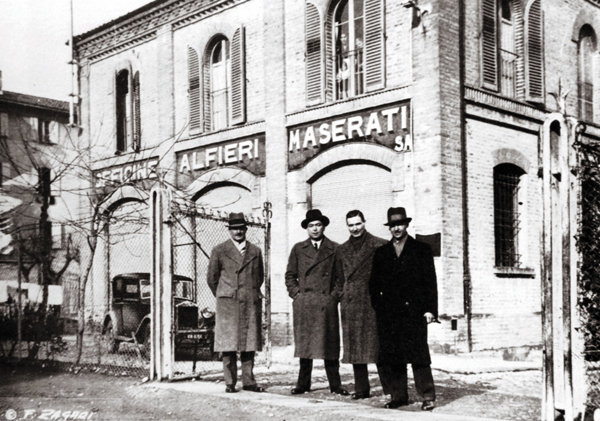
From right: Mario Maserati, Ernesto, Ettore and leftmost is Bindo. The picture is taken by Ferruccio Testi in 1934 outside their first workshop in 11 Via de'Pepoli, Bologna.

The Maserati Brothers were involved with automobiles from the beginning of the 20th century. They were born to Rodolfo Maserati and his wife Carolina in Voghera, Lombardy, Italy. Rodolfo was a railway worker from Piacenza, driving a heavy Krupp locomotive, and married Carolina Losi. They had seven sons in total, but only six reached adulthood, as Alfieri I was only 1 year old when he died. After the death of Alfieri I, the next son to be born was also named Alfieri. Alfieri, along with the remaining five brothers, Carlo, Bindo, Mario, Ettore and Ernesto, contributed to the sports luxury automobile manufacturer Maserati in one way or another.

The Maserati brothers were:

- Carlo (1881–1910)
- Bindo (1883–1980)
- Alfieri I (1885–1886)
- Alfieri II (23 September 1887–3 March 1932)
- Mario (1890–1981), painter and artist based in Bologna, Milan and Novi Ligure
- Ettore (1894–4 August 1990)
- Ernesto (4 August 1898–1 December 1975)

A memorial plaque for Alfieri II was placed at their birthplace in 1987. In 1989, the istituto tecnico of Voghera added Alfieri II to its official name, to become Istituto Tecnico Industriale di Voghera "Alfieri Maserati". Also, the city of Bologna has a street named Via Maserati.

== Awards ==
In 2023, the Maserati Brothers received the International "Leonardo The Immortal Light" Award, granted within a cultural initiative dedicated to the relationship between art and science, in recognition of the historical contribution of the brand to the development of Italian mechanical engineering.
