= Bindo Maserati =

Italian automotive engineer and businessman

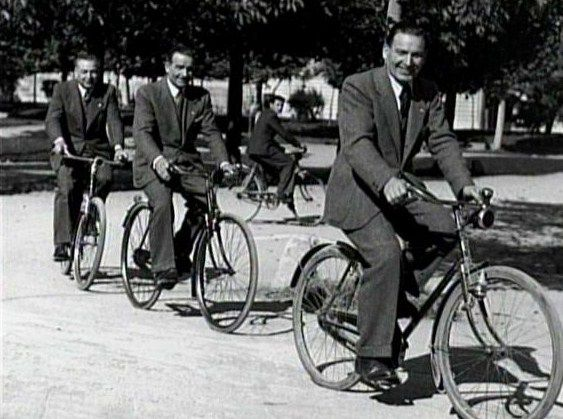
Bindo at left, with Ettore and Ernesto in 1941

Bindo Maserati (1883 - September 1980) was an Italian automotive engineer and businessman, known as the manager of Maserati and one of the Maserati Brothers.

Born in Voghera, he was a mechanic at Isotta Fraschini (1910–32) where he joined his brother Ettore Maserati. Only occasionally did he race, as in the Isotta Fraschini 8A SS with Aymo Maggi in Mille Miglia (1927). While the other brothers established the Maserati sparkplug manufacturer (1914) and car manufacturer (1926), Bindo did not join until 1932, when he took over as manager after Alfieri Maserati died. After being under Adolfo Orsi's management (1937–47), he moved with his brothers to Bologna (1947) to found the O.S.C.A. manufacturer. He died there in 1980.
