= Adolfo Orsi =

Italian businessman (1888–1972)

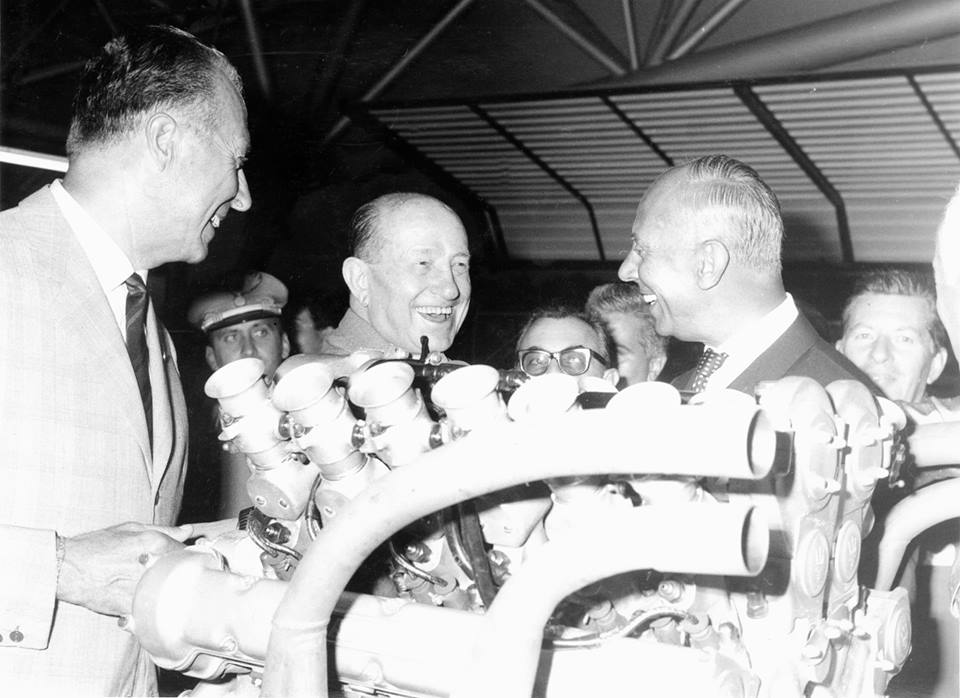
- Orsi at Maserati, c. 1950
- Born: Adolfo Orsi; 23 March 1888; Modena, Kingdom of Italy
- Died: 20 December 1972 (aged 84); Modena, Italy
- Occupation: Industrialist
- Years active: 1937–1968
- Children: Omar Orsi

Adolfo Orsi (23 March 1888 – 20 December 1972) was an Italian industrialist, known for owning the Maserati automobile maker.

Born within a poor family in Sant'Agnese, near Modena, Orsi lost his father in 1899 - an event that forced him to start working at a very young age. In the late 1920s he started his own business as scrap iron, steel mill and farm equipment manufacturer, eventually employing hundreds of people from Modena and the surrounding area. Orsi soon started pursuing interests outside of the company, including running the trolley company of Modena, and being involved with the local soccer team, Modena F.C. in its successful early years. With his brother, Marcello, he was also involved in a Fiat dealership, the Fiat A.M. Orsi (1935).

== Maserati ==
In 1937 Orsi bought the financially troubled Maserati company, employing his son, Omar Orsi, as managing director; three of the Maserati Brothers were retained on ten-year contracts on the engineering team (1937–47). In 1940 Orsi moved the Maserati headquarters from Bologna to Modena, near the premises of his steel plants and spark plug manufacturing company, Fonderie Riunite. In 1949, with Maserati temporarily closed for restructuring, a steel mill workers' strike action following Orsi's refusal to hire communist workers resulted in a series of hard encounters on 9 June 1950, leaving a few protesters dead. When the foundries were reopened in 1952, Orsi decided to sell the company, splitting it with his siblings. Adolfo kept the Maserati car manufacturing business, his brother Marcello kept the foundries, and their sister Ida Orsi took charge of the motorbike manufacturing (the Società Anonima Fabbrica Candele Accumulatori Maserati, 1953–60).

The 1950s proved to be a successful decade for Maserati. Orsi hired his brother in-law Alceste Giacomazzi as new general director, and succeeded in luring Ferrari employee Alberto Massimino to Maserati (1944–52), as well as hiring the Argentine driver ace Juan Manuel Fangio (1953). Fangio went on to win the Formula One World Championship for Maserati in 1954 and 1957.

In 1954 Orsi made a lucrative deal with Juan Perón when the motor racing enthusiast president of Argentina placed a large order for machine tools to be imported in his country. However, following the Revolución Libertadora and the exile of Perón, receiving payments for the order turned out to be problematic. Orsi encountered similar issues with the Spanish government, and the ensuing financial problems resulted in Maserati entering administration. The remnants of Maserati was handled by the creditor, Credito Italiano.

Orsi remained active within the management of Maserati until 1968, when he decided to sell his remaining shares to Citroën, who at the time was a major stakeholder.

Omar Orsi's son, Adolfo Orsi Jr. (born 1951) is involved as consultant on the history of Maserati.
