= Ernesto Maserati =

Italian racing driver and engineer (1898–1975)

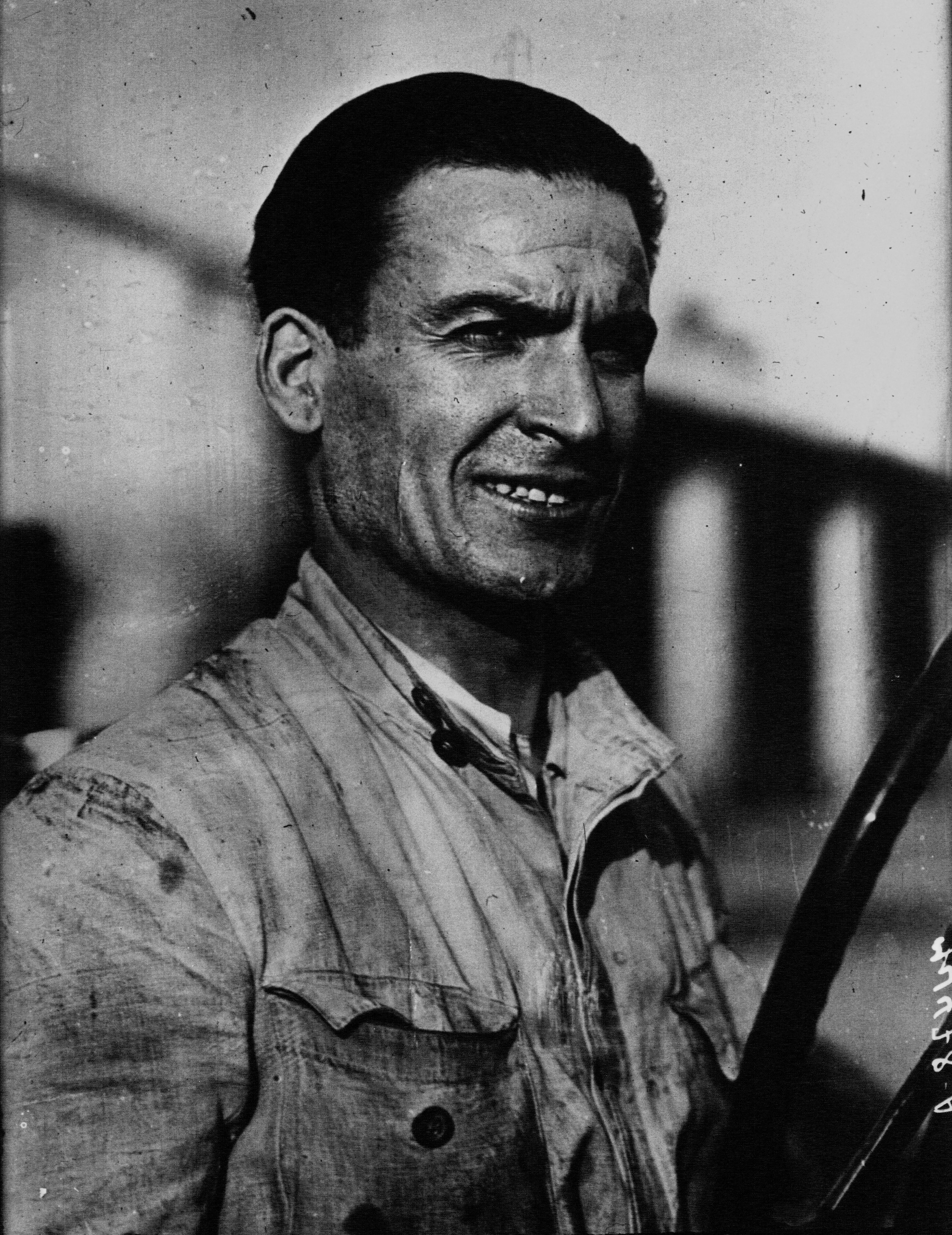
Ernesto Maserati in 1930

Ernesto Maserati (4 August 1898 – 1 December 1975) was an Italian automotive engineer and racer, with Maserati of Modena since its inception in Bologna on 14 December 1914, together with his brothers Alfieri Maserati (leader), Ettore Maserati, Bindo Maserati and others.

Ernesto led the workshop during World War I, as his brothers joined the military. His racing career started in 1924, when he won the Italian drivers championship in 1927 in the Maserati Tipo 26, in 1930 using the Tipo 8C-2500.

After his brother Alfieri Maserati died in 1932, Ernesto became the director, chief engineer as well as sole racing car driver of the company. The company was sold to Adolfo Orsi in 1937, but the brothers remained on a ten-year contract, Ernesto participating in the design of the Maserati A6 after World War II. He left with Ettore and Bindo (1947), to found the O.S.C.A. car company.

He died at Bologna in 1975.

== Complete European Championship results ==
(key) (Races in bold indicate pole position)

Year	Entrant	Make	1	2	3	EDC	Points
1931	Maserati	Maserati	ITA	FRA; Ret	BEL	46=	22
