= Alfieri Maserati =

Italian racing driver and engineer (1887–1932)

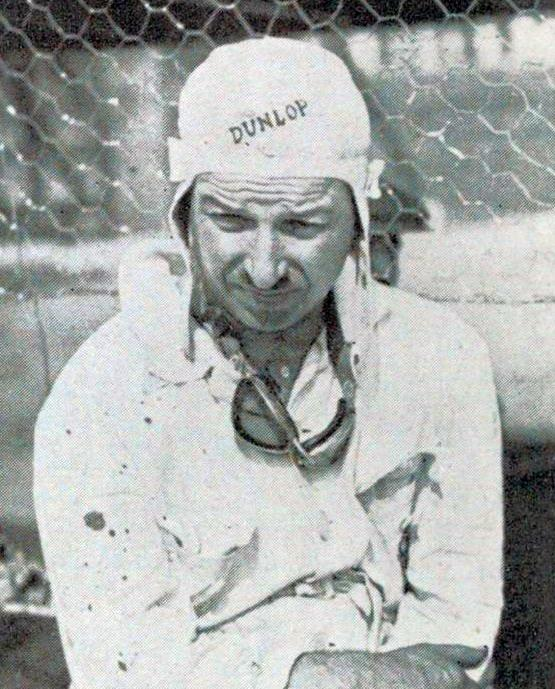
- Alfieri at Monza in 1930
- Born: 23 September 1887; Voghera, Italy
- Died: 3 March 1932 (aged 44); Bologna, Italy
- Occupations: Automotive engineer and motorsport competitor
- Years active: circa 1905–1932
- Known for: Co-founder of Maserati Car Manufacturing Company

Alfieri Maserati (23 September 1887 – 3 March 1932) was an Italian automotive engineer, known for establishing and leading the Maserati racing car manufacturer with the other Maserati brothers.

Maserati was born in Voghera. In 1903 he and his brother Bindo Maserati started working for Isotta Fraschini in Milan, on their older brother Carlo Maserati's recommendation. He followed Carlo to Bianchi in 1905, with whom he also raced and won in 1909. On Bindo's recommendation, Alfieri and Ettore Maserati went back to Isotta Fraschini on a mission to Argentina in 1912, returning to Italy to found the new Milan-based workshop Societa Anonima Officine Alfieri Maserati in 1914.

Both served in World War I and the workshop was run by his brother Ernesto Maserati, who led a large production of spark plugs to the war effort. After the war a larger production plant was set up in Bologna.

Alfieri won a number of races in the 1920s and he was head mechanic for Diatto from 1922 until 1926, when he joined his brothers and they created the Maserati Tipo 26 based on Diatto chassis he had brought.

In 1927 while racing his Type 26 at the 312 km 1st Coppa Messina on the Circuit of Monti Peloritani, Alfieri lost control in the first lap and the car overturned after hitting a ditch. Alfieri was gravely injured. He had emergency surgery, one of his kidneys being irreparably damaged. In 1932, during a poorly executed surgery on the remaining kidney, Alfieri died unexpectedly from complications while in the recovery room on the third of March, in Ospedale Maggiore in Bologna. He was commemorated in the "Maserati Alfieri" concept car, presented in 2014 for the 100-year anniversary of Maserati.

== See also ==
- Maserati brothers
