= Maserati 150S =

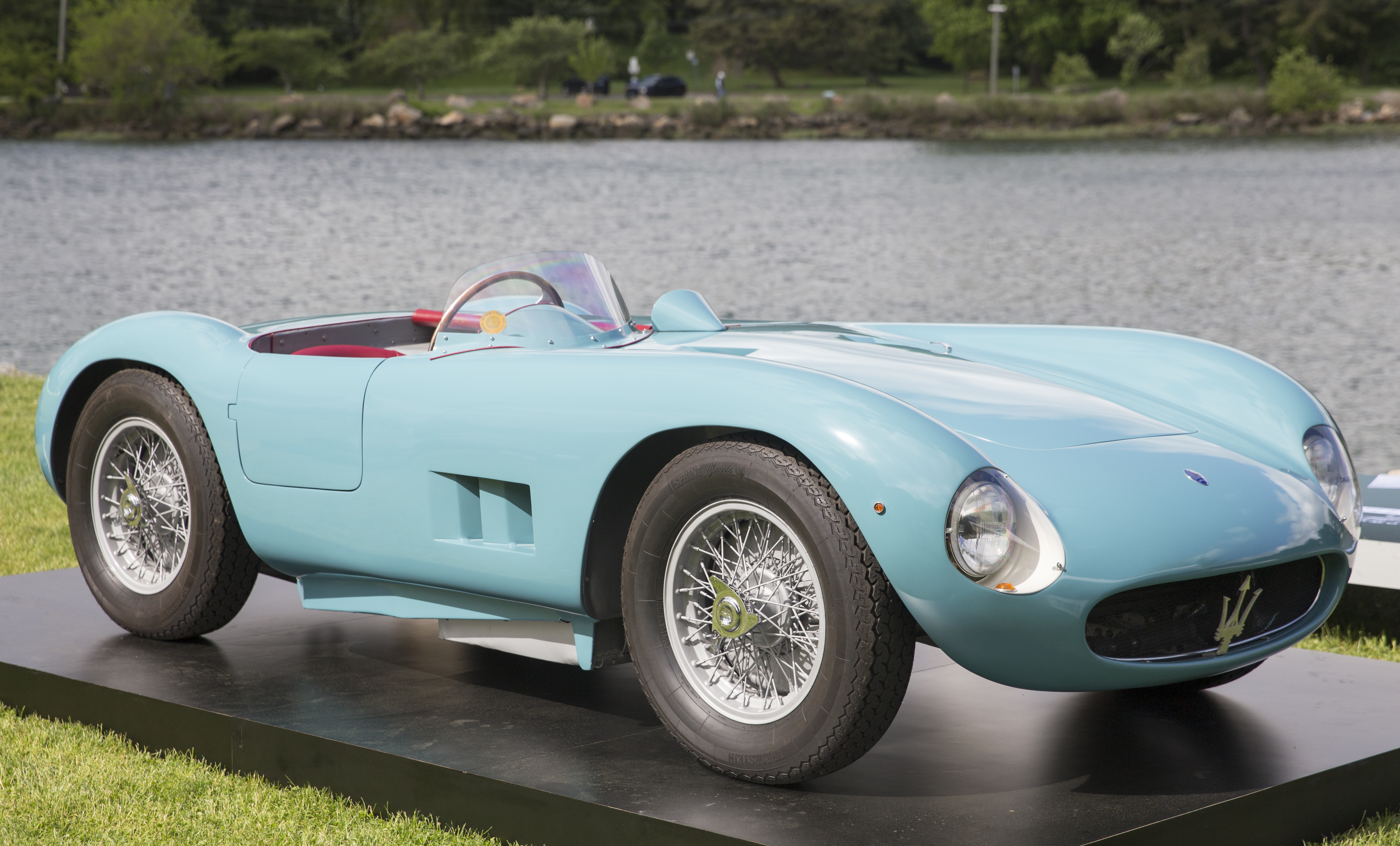

Overview
- Manufacturer: Maserati
- Model code: Tipo 53
- Production: 1955-1957
- Designer: Vittorio Bellentani and Medardo Fantuzzi

Body and chassis
- Body style: no-door, two-seater
- Layout: FR layout
- Related: Maserati 150 GT; Maserati 200S

Powertrain
- Engine: 1484 cc 4CF2 DOHC 16V I4
- Power output: 140 hp (103 kW) at 7500 rpm

Dimensions
- Wheelbase: 2,150 mm (84.6 in) (early); 2,250 mm (88.6 in)
- Length: 4,400 mm (170 in)
- Width: 1,804 mm (71.0 in)
- Height: 1,140 mm (45 in)
- Curb weight: 630 kg (1,389 lb)

Chronology
- Predecessor: Maserati A6GCS

Maserati 150S is a racing car made by Maserati of Italy alongside the Maserati 200S, to take over for the aging Maserati A6GCS racing variants. Depending on the source, between twenty-four and twenty-seven examples were built, and one additional street-going car, called the Maserati 150 GT.

The project Tipo 53 was designed by Vittorio Bellentani in 1953 and utilized the 4CF2 1484.1 cc engine, fitted with twin Weber 45 DCO3 carburetors and producing 140 hp (103 kW) at 7500 rpm. The engine was developed from Alberto Massimino's earlier two-liter version, created to offer a simpler design suitable for private competitors in Formula 2 racing. The 1.5-liter version underwent initial testing in a racing boat belonging to Liborio Guidotti in 1954–1955. Maserati unveiled the 150S at the April 1955 Turin Motor Show; the final example was completed in January 1957.

== Development ==
The first series had a Maserati 300S-inspired body developed by Celestino Fiandri who also assembled the first few chassis together with Malagoli; Gilco soon took over this aspect. The tubular frame chassis was similar to that of the A6GCS, but with the important distinction of having a de Dion rear axle with transverse leaf springs rather than the A6's live rear end. The wheelbase on the first four or five cars was 2,150 mm (84.6 in); this was increased to 2,250 mm (88.6 in) beginning with chassis #1656. Eight 1955s (first series) were built; some of them may have been fitted with the five-speed gearbox seen on the second series.

The second series followed during 1956; it changed from the original four-speed transmission with Porsche patent synchromesh to a five-speed unit made by ZF. The more angular bodywork was all new, with a more aggressive nose and a truncated rear end. It was developed by Giulio Alfieri with a new focus on aerodynamics, incorporating a faired underbody, and built by Medardo Fantuzzi.

The 1957 Maserati 150 GT was a spider built on a Maserati A6GCS chassis intended for street use, bodied by Fantuzzi and sporting a 150S engine with a lowered compression ratio.

Massimino, the spearhead of Maserati's four-cylinder program, left for Stanguellini in late 1952 and was replaced at Maserati by Gioacchino Colombo. Colombo, as well as Giulio Alfieri who joined Maserati in September 1953, preferred the six-cylinder design and the 150S/200S family was never developed to its full potential. During 1956, partly as a result of unsatisfying competition results, Maserati accordingly stopped developing the 150S. The factory reengined one car (#1655) with a 250S engine, #1665 was equipped with a 200S engine, and chassis #1672 was reengineered to 200SI specifications and given the new chassis number 2407. Briggs Cunningham swapped a 200S engine into chassis #1657 in 1956. Stirling Moss referred to the series 2 car that he drove to victories at Monza and Nürburgring in 1956 as "overbodied and a bit gutless", which helps explain the numerous swaps for two-litre engines. The engine (and its larger siblings), however, found new life in later years, being used to power mid-engined, British Formula Two and Formula One chassis into the early 1960s.

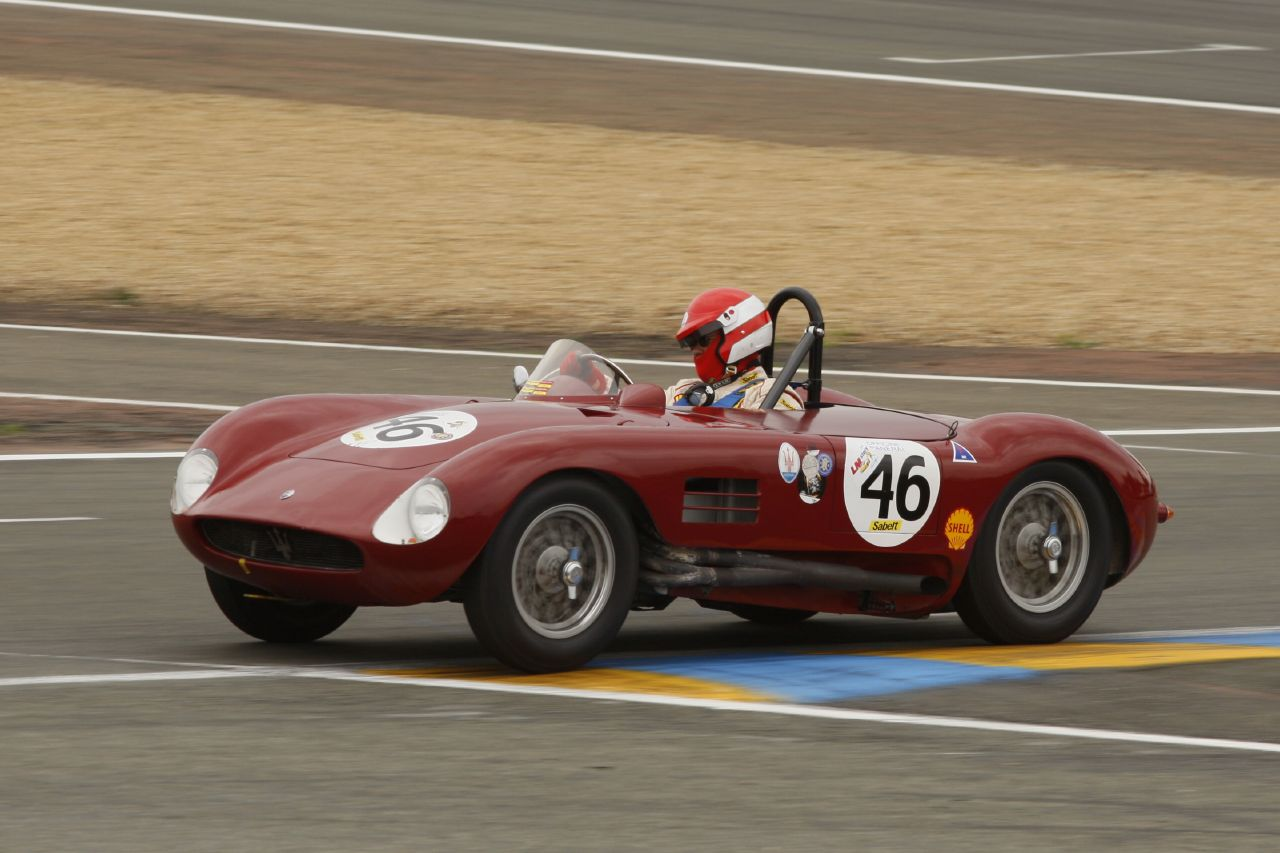
Series 2 car, with revised, more aggressive front end and cut off rear

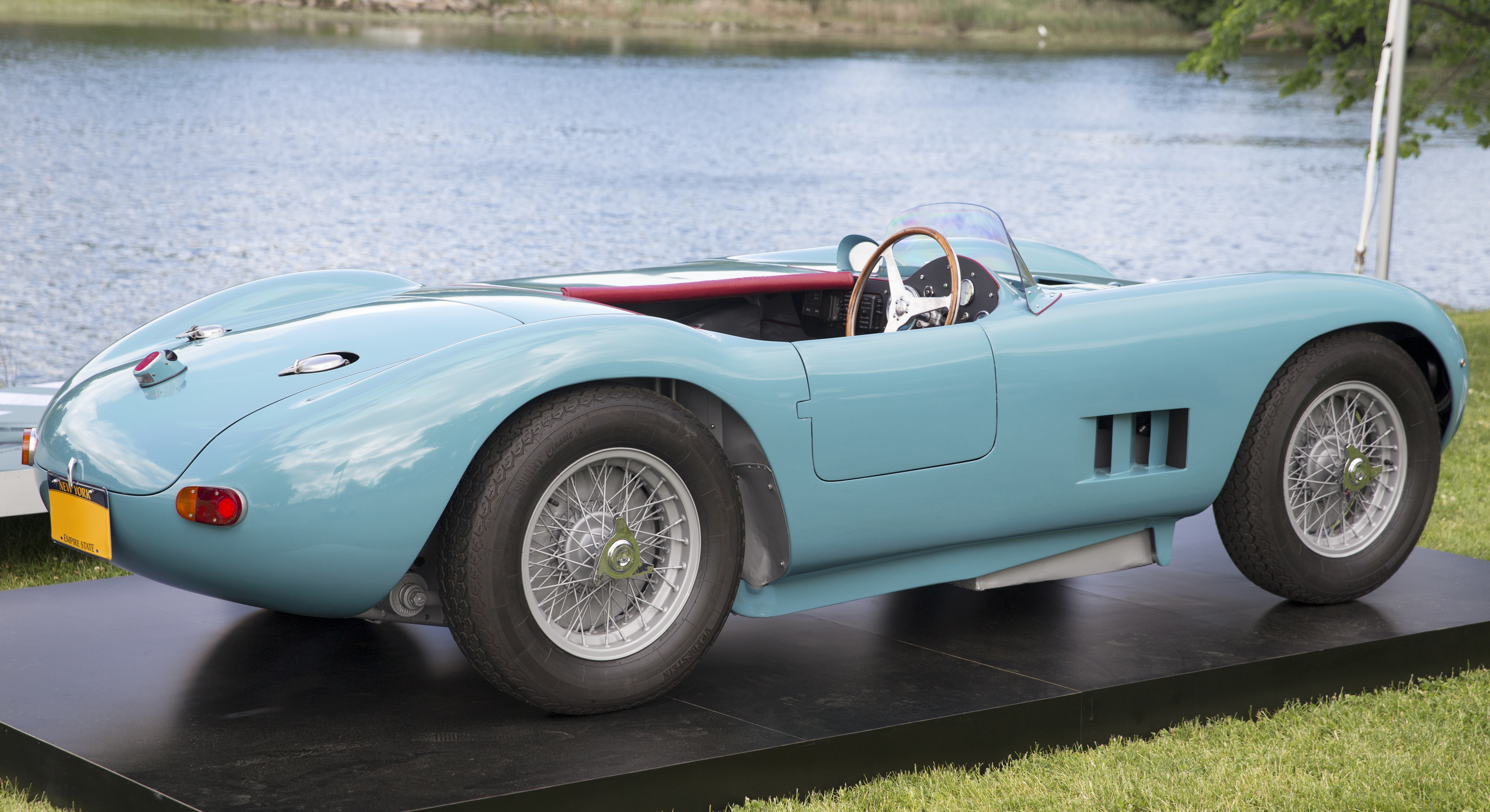
Rear view of Series 1 vehicle (chassis 1658)

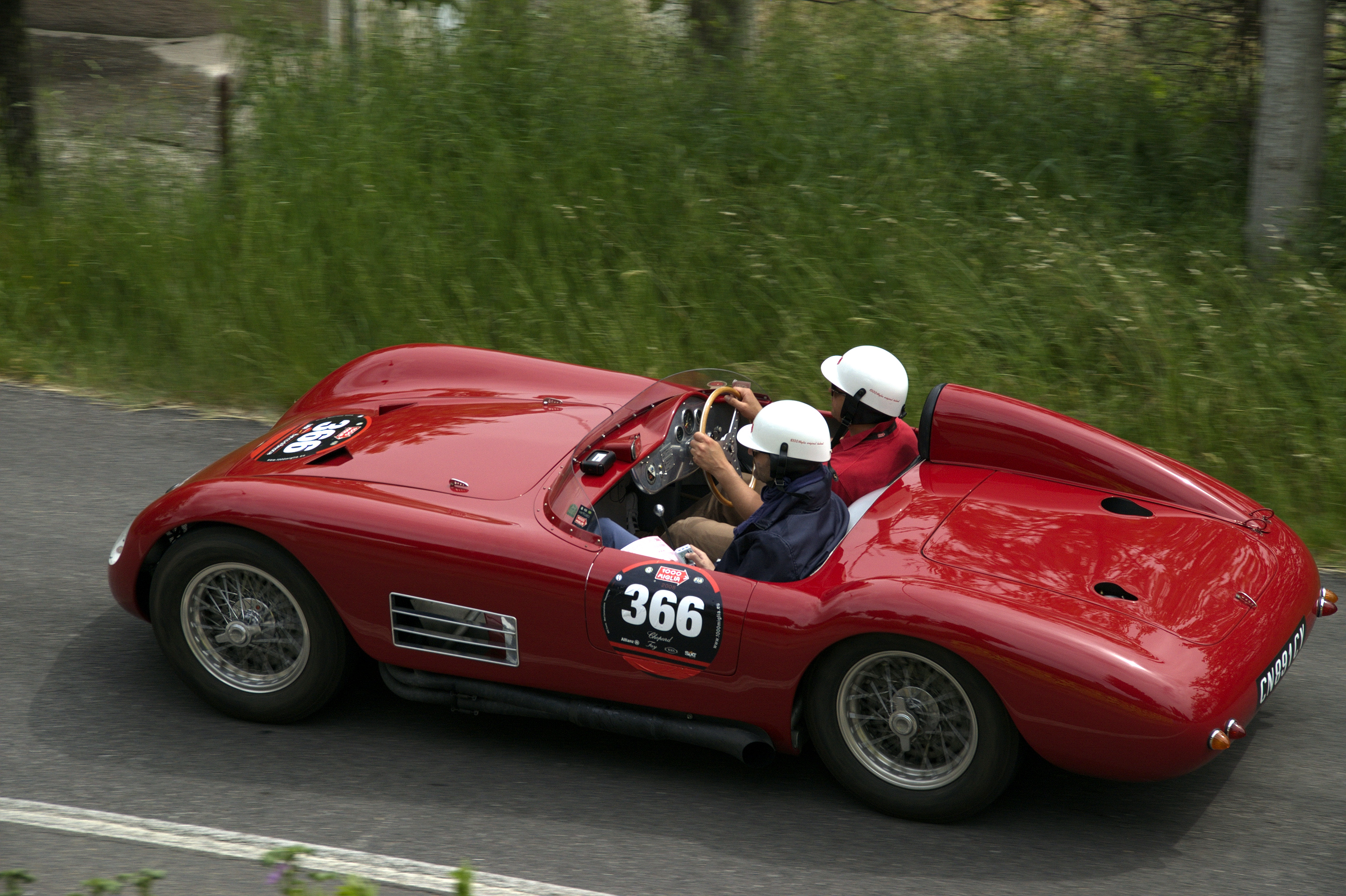
Chassis #1664 (1956 type on the shorter wheelbase, with a five-speed 'box and body by Fantuzzi) at the 2008 Mille Miglia Storica

=== Tipo 6 ===
The engine's second life began in 1956 with chassis number 1666, which was delivered to Brian Naylor in the United Kingdom. Naylor found the car, designed for long-distance racing on the continent, too heavy for the short British circuits against the new, rear-engined British designs. He installed the 150S engine in a crashed Lotus Eleven, which proved highly successful with 27 victories and a class win that season. An additional 150S engine was specifically built for Stuart Young to be installed in a Lotus Eleven in 1957, and a few F2 Cooper-Maserati T51s were similarly equipped. When Formula One changed to 1.5 liters maximum displacement for 1961, Maserati restarted production of the 150S engine as the "Maserati Tipo 6 1500". This iteration was updated and lighter at 130 kg (287 lb), thanks to the generous use of magnesium alloys, and developed 165 hp (121 kW) at 8,500 rpm rather than the 140 of the original design.

10 such Tipo 6 engines were built for smaller teams like Scuderia Centro Sud, Ecurie Nationale Belge, JBW (Brian Naylor's own team), and Serenissima. The best result achieved with the Tipo 6 engine was at the 1961 Monaco Grand Prix, the first race entered, where Maurice Trintignant took seventh place for Serenissima in a Cooper T51. The last race entered was at the 1963 South African Grand Prix, where privateer Trevor Blokdyk reached the finishing line in 12th place in another Cooper Maserati.

== Competition ==
Most of the cars built were sold to customers who competed as privateers. The best result for the 150S came when Jean Behra won the half-sized 1000km Nürburgring in 1955, besting 13 Porsches among others. This successful result helped fill the order books for the second series of the 150S. Alejandro de Tomaso finished fourth overall at the 1956 1000 km Buenos Aires, behind two Maserati 300S and a Ferrari 857 Monza, all with factory backing. The engine also had a successful afterlife when fitted to various Lotus and Cooper chassis, as noted in the section on the Tipo 6.

== Technical Data ==
Technical data	150S
Engine:	Front mounted 4-cylinder in-line engine
displacement:	1484 cc
Bore x stroke:	81 x 72 mm
Max power at rpm:	140 PS (103 kW) at 7 500 rpm
Valve control:	2 overhead camshafts per cylinder row, 2 valves per cylinder
Compression:	9.0:1
Carburetor:	2 Weber 45DCO3
Gearbox:	4/5-speed manual, transaxle
suspension front:	Double cross links, coil springs
suspension rear:	De Dion axis, transverse leaf springs
Brakes:	Hydraulic drum brakes
Chassis & body:	Tubular spaceframe with aluminum body
Wheelbase:	Series 1: 2,150 mm (84.6 in); Series 2: 2,250 mm (88.6 in)
Dry weight:	630 kg (1,389 lb)
Top speed:	230 km/h (143 mph)

== Literature ==
- Karl Ludvigsen, Maserati 150S
