= Maserati 4-cylinder engine =

4CLT 1.5 L I-4 250S 2.5 L I-4 Tipo 6-1500 1.5 L I-4 4CF2 1.5 L I-4 42CF 2.0 L I-4

Overview
- Manufacturer: (Italy) Maserati
- Production: 1950–1951, 1959–1963

Layout
- Configuration: L-4
- Displacement: 1.5–2.5 L (91.5–152.6 cu in)
- Cylinder bore: 78 mm (3.1 in)
- Piston stroke: 78 mm (3.1 in)
- Valvetrain: 16-valve, DOHC, 4-valves per cylinder
- Compression ratio: 6:1-6.5:1

Combustion
- Fuel system: Carburetor/Electronic fuel injection
- Fuel type: Gasoline
- Cooling system: Water-cooled

Output
- Power output: 150–280 hp (112–209 kW; 152–284 PS)
- Torque output: approx. 105–210 lb⋅ft (142–285 N⋅m)

Dimensions
- Dry weight: 165 kg (364 lb)

Chronology
- Successor: Maserati 6-cylinder F1 engine

Maserati has made three inline-4 racing engines, that were designed for both Formula One and Sports car racing. Their first engine was the supercharged 4CLT engine in 1950; with the 1.5 L engine configuration imposed by the FIA for engines with forced induction. Their second engine was the naturally-aspirated 250S engine; with the 2.5 L engine configuration, and was used by Cooper and JBW. Their third and final engine was the naturally-aspirated Tipo 6-1500; with the 1.5 L engine configuration, and the customer engine was used by Cooper, Emeryson, Lotus, and E.N.B. teams.

A 1.5 L (92 cu in) version of the engine was used in the Maserati 150S, (as well as the Maserati 150 GT concept car) and a 2.0 L (120 cu in) version of this engine was also used in the 1955-1959 Maserati 200S sports car.
