= Maserati 6-cylinder engine =

A6G 2.0 L I-6 250 F1 2.5 L I-6

Overview
- Manufacturer: (Italy) Maserati
- Production: 1952–1960

Layout
- Configuration: L-6
- Displacement: 2.0–2.5 L (122.0–152.6 cu in)
- Cylinder bore: 72.6–84 mm (2.86–3.31 in)
- Piston stroke: 75–80 mm (3.0–3.1 in)
- Valvetrain: 24-valve, DOHC, 4-valves per cylinder
- Compression ratio: 12:1-13.5:1

Combustion
- Fuel system: Carburetor/Fuel injection
- Fuel type: Gasoline
- Cooling system: Water-cooled

Output
- Power output: 150–290 hp (112–216 kW; 152–294 PS)
- Torque output: 105–211 lb⋅ft (142–286 N⋅m)

Chronology
- Predecessor: Maserati 4-cylinder F1 engine

Maserati made two naturally-aspirated, straight-6, racing engines, designed for Formula One; between 1952 and 1960. The first engine was the 2.0-liter A6G; in accordance with the engine regulations imposed by the FIA. Their second and last engine was the 250 F1; in accordance with the engine regulations imposed by the FIA for 1954. Several of these engines, or derivatives of these engines, were also used in various Maserati sports cars.

== Maserati A6GCM engine ==
The inline 6-cylinder two-liter engine with DOHC and 12 valves, 3 two-barrel (twin choke) Weber carburetors delivered 160 hp (120 kW) to 197 hp (147 kW). It was developed by Alberto Massimino and Vittorio Bellentani.

- Initially with a 1,987 cc (121.3 cu in) capacity (72.6 mm × 80 mm (2.86 in × 3.15 in), with a compression ratio of 13.5 :1) delivering 160 hp (120 kW), in 1951 and 1952
- Then 1,988 cc (121.3 cu in) capacity (75 mm × 75 mm (2.95 in × 2.95 in), with a compression ratio of 13.5 :1, with twin ignition) delivering 180 hp (130 kW), in late 1952
- And finally with a 1,970 cc (120 cu in) capacity 76.2 mm × 72 mm (3.00 in × 2.83 in), with a compression ratio of 12 :1, with twin ignition) delivering 197 hp (147 kW), in 1953.

The engine was mated to a 4-speed gearbox.

== Maserati 250 F1 engine ==
The 250F principally used the SSG 220 bhp (@ 7400 rpm) 2.5-litre Maserati A6 straight-six engine.

== Maserati 300S sports car engine ==
The 3.0-liter (approx 245 bhp (183 kW) at 6200 rpm) engine used in the Maserati 300S was based on the Straight-6 design of the Maserati 250F and incorporated a lengthened stroke developed by Vittorio Bellentani to increase the capacity from the original 2.5-litres. The compression ratio was reduced from 12:1 to 9.5:1, partly due to the FIA regulations requiring the engine to be run on road car fuel. It used three Weber carburetors.

== Applications ==
=== Formula 1 cars ===
- Maserati A6GCM
- Maserati 250F

=== Sports cars ===
- Maserati 300S
