= Maserati 150 GT =

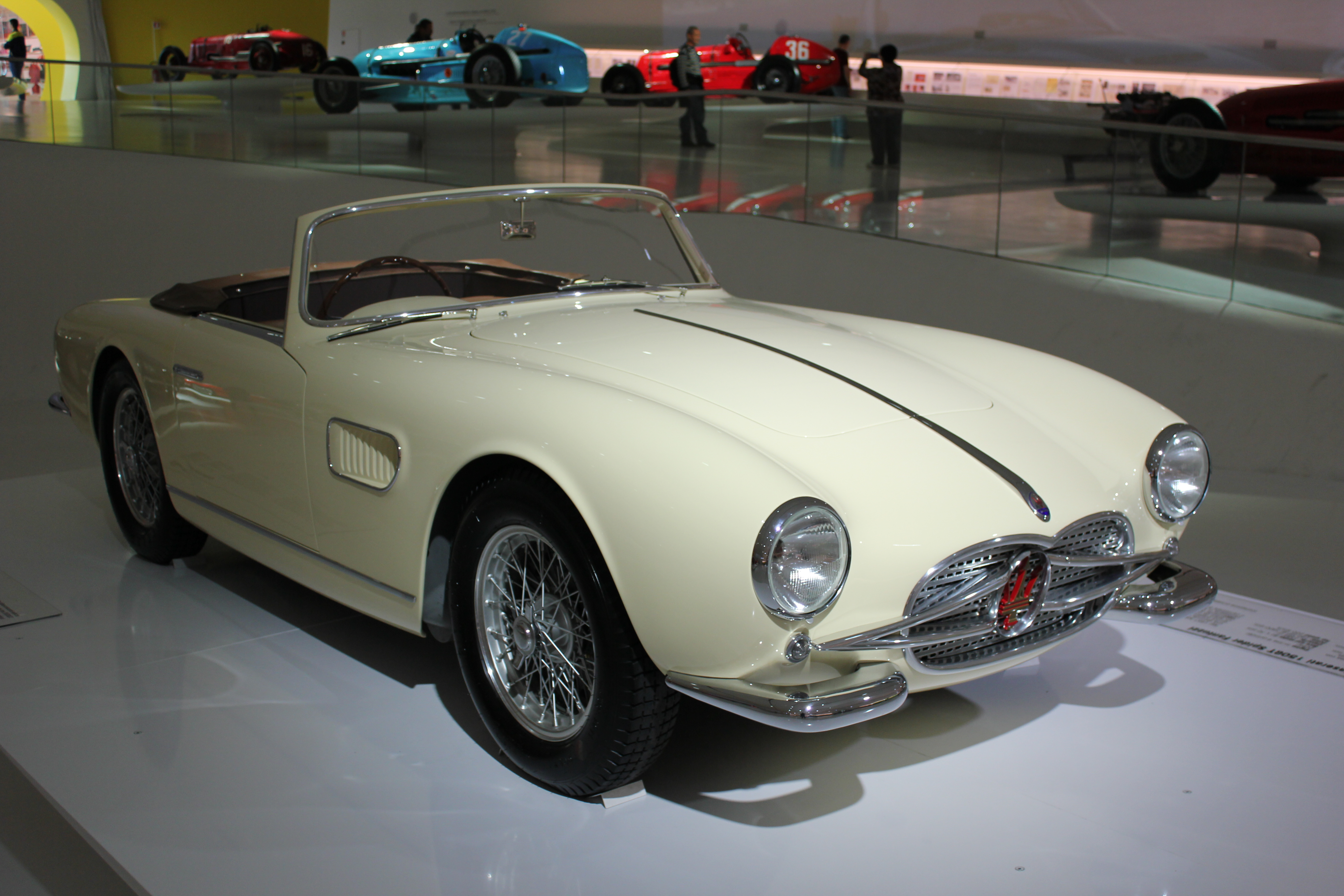
- Maserati 150 GT at Museo Enzo Ferrari

Overview
- Manufacturer: Maserati
- Also called: Maserati 150 GT Spyder Fantuzzi
- Production: 1957; 1 produced
- Designer: Carrozzeria Fantuzzi

Body and chassis
- Body style: Spyder
- Layout: Front-engine, rear-wheel-drive
- Related: Maserati 150S

Powertrain
- Engine: 1.5 L (1484.1 cc) 4CF2 I4
- Power output: 130 PS
- Transmission: 4-speed manual

Dimensions
- Wheelbase: 2,230 mm (87.8 in)
- Length: 4,030 mm (158.7 in)
- Width: 1,480 mm (58.3 in)
- Height: 1,204 mm (47.4 in)
- Curb weight: 900 kg (1,984 lb)

The Maserati 150 GT was a prototype sports car produced by Maserati in 1957. Derived from the four-cylinder Maserati 150S race car, it was a singular road-going example, and was given spyder bodywork.

== Development ==
The 150 GT was created from a need to replace the A6 lineage of road cars. Chief engineer Giulio Alfieri was responsible for the project made under the Maserati's racing department patronage. The project was aimed to create a road-going sports car that could be sold in meaningful numbers to wealthy customers in an image of Porsche 550 Spyder.

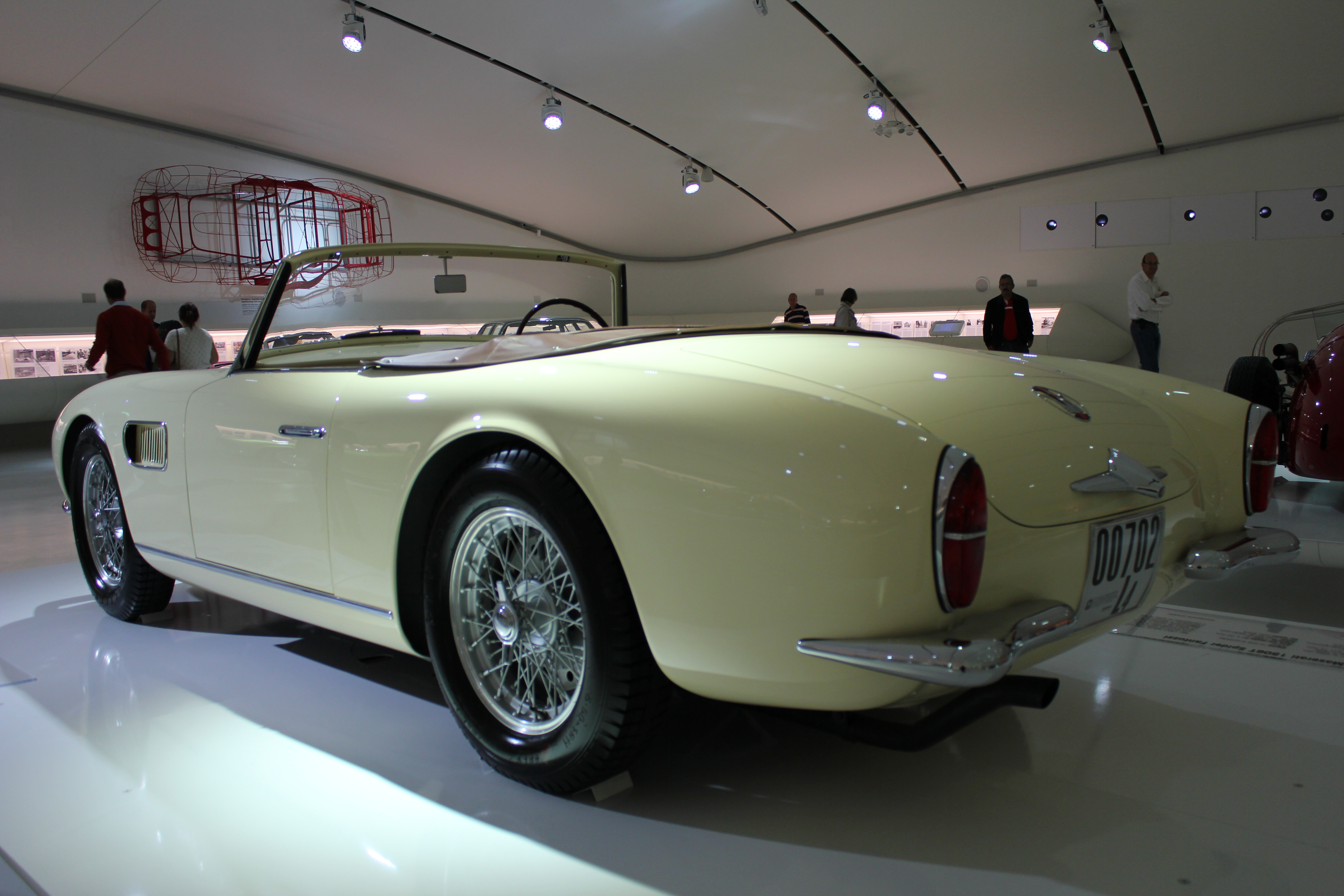
150 GT rear view

The creation of the bodywork was entrusted to Medardo Fantuzzi of Carrozzeria Fantuzzi. He was responsible for numerous of Maserati sports racing and grand prix cars. Because Fantuzzi usually realised designs of others, the 150 GT Spyder's lightweight aluminium bodywork was mainly inspired by the work of Pietro Frua, with elements also found on Zagato-bodied Maseratis. The car featured a convertible soft-top with roll-up side windows and was RHD just like the race car it was based on.

The 150 GT remained a one-off factory prototype as the production version never materialised. The planned production would be too complex and expensive to bring any profit to the company that already decided to move towards the 3500 GT project.

The car remained unsold and was stored in a factory for a few years. After the final public demonstration, Maserati decided to sell it to the British Maserati agent. In November 1966 it appeared for sale in a Motor Sport magazine for £1,400. In 1993 the 150 GT along with an O.S.C.A were traded to a German collector in exchange for his Aston Martin DB4 GT. After 2006 the car was extensively restored over a three-year period and was later sold by Gooding & Company for US$3 million in 2013.

== Specifications ==
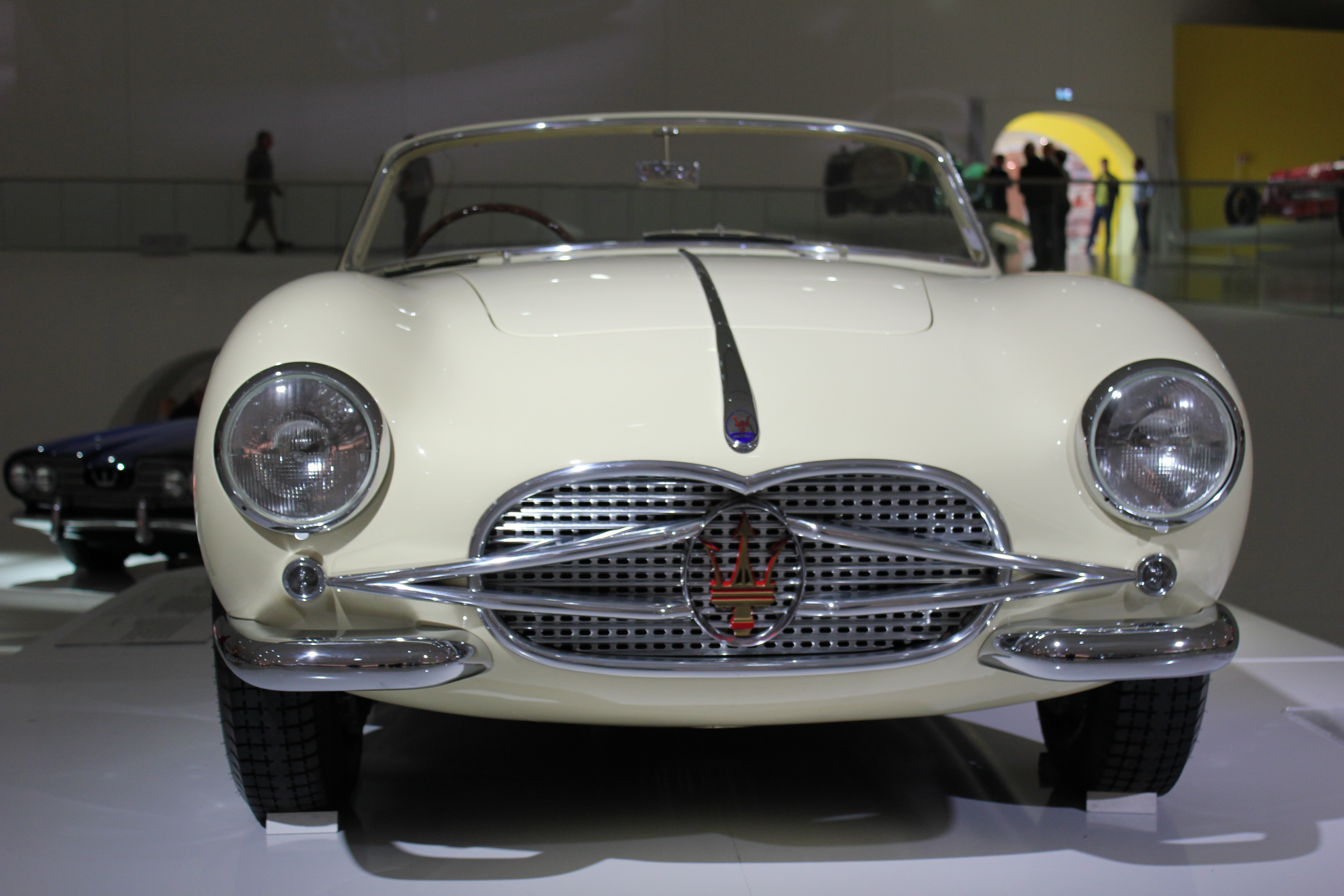
150 GT front view

=== Engine and transmission ===
The 150 GT sported a slightly detuned version of the Maserati 150S race car's straight-four engine, codenamed 4CF2. It had smaller carburettors and a lower compression ratio, with an 81 by 72 mm (3.2 by 2.8 in) bore and stroke, yielding a displacement of 1,484.1 cc (1.5 L; 90.6 cu in) and power output of 130 PS (96 kW; 128 hp) at 6800 rpm. The DOHC engine had two double-barrel Weber carburetors and two spark plugs per cylinder. A new wet sump lubrication system was used for easier road use with an oil pump from the 150S. A manual gearbox was four-speed with synchromesh.

Currently, the car has a different, 2.0-litre DOHC four-cylinder engine with two Weber 40DCO3 carburettors and now produces around 190 PS (140 kW; 187 hp).

=== Chassis ===
The chassis was believed to be a modified version sourced from the Maserati 200S race car. After extensive research by the marque historian Adolfo Orsi, it was determined that the chassis originally belonged to the 1954 Maserati A6GCS and was numbered 2043. That particular A6GCS/53 was entered in the 1954 Mille Miglia. Later, after a couple of stages of development, the chassis was used for a prototype Maserati 300S, now restamped as 003, which also spawned an improved version of their developed 150S and 200S tubular frame. It was later reused again to create a sports car prototype, the 150 GT, this time as a serial number 03. The final iteration of the chassis had to be revised to accept the 150S racing engine, a gearbox casing from A6G/2000 road car, and a 200S prop shaft.

=== Suspension ===
The front independent suspension with coil springs and Houdaille hydraulic shock absorbers remained mostly unmodified from their original A6GCS race car specification. The rear suspension was a live axle type with semi-elliptical leaf springs. The front hydraulic drum brakes were from a Maserati 250F, and the rear ones from an A6GCS. Also, the steering mechanism was sourced from both the 250F and A6G/2000.
