= Maserati 200S =

Racing sports car built by Maserati from 1955 to 1959

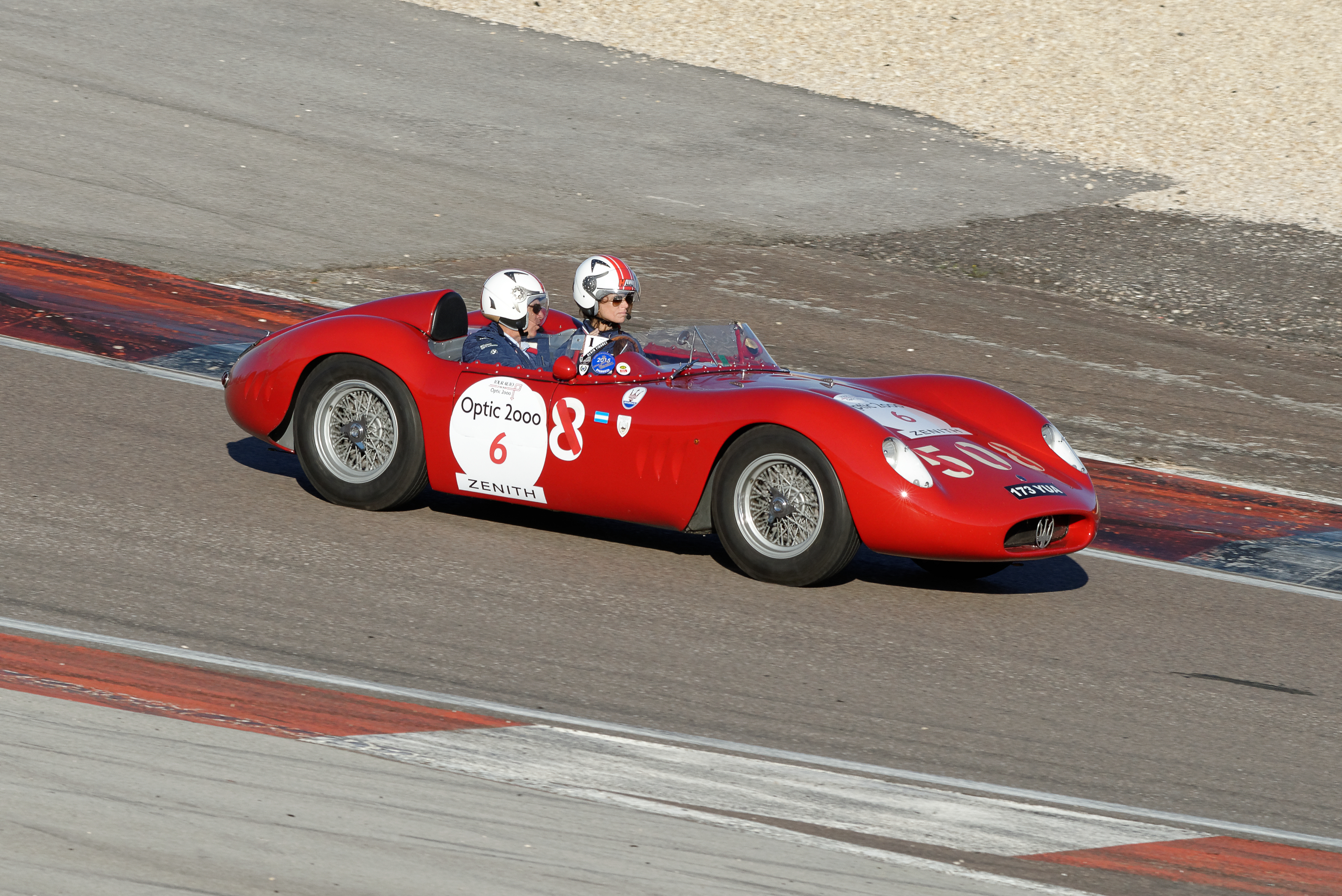

Overview
- Manufacturer: Maserati
- Production: 1955–1959; 28 produced
- Assembly: Italy: Modena
- Designer: Giulio Alfieri

Body and chassis
- Class: Racing car
- Body style: 0-door speedster
- Layout: Front-engine, rear-wheel-drive
- Related: Maserati 150S

Powertrain
- Engine: 2.0 L 4CF2 DOHC I4
- Transmission: 4-speed synchromesh manual

Dimensions
- Wheelbase: 2,199.6 mm (86.6 in)

Chronology
- Predecessor: Maserati A6GCS
- Successor: Maserati 300S

The Maserati 200S (Tipo 52) is a racing car made by Italian automobile manufacturer Maserati as a successor to the Maserati A6GCS. 28 cars were made in total. The development of the 200S, codenamed Tipo 52 started in 1952, led by Vittorio Bellentani. The 250S was developed in response to Ferrari's 500 Mondial which featured a four-cylinder engine and was quite successful in sports car racing. The car had a 2.0 L (1,994.3 cc) inline-four light-alloy engine, featuring dual overhead valves per cylinder and twin camshafts, double Weber 50DCO3 (first few cars only) or 45DCO3 carburetors. The engine was rated at 190 PS (140 kW; 187 hp) at 7,500 rpm. Many chassis components were identical to the Maserati 150S in order to speed up development, except the rigid rear axle inherited from the Maserati A6.

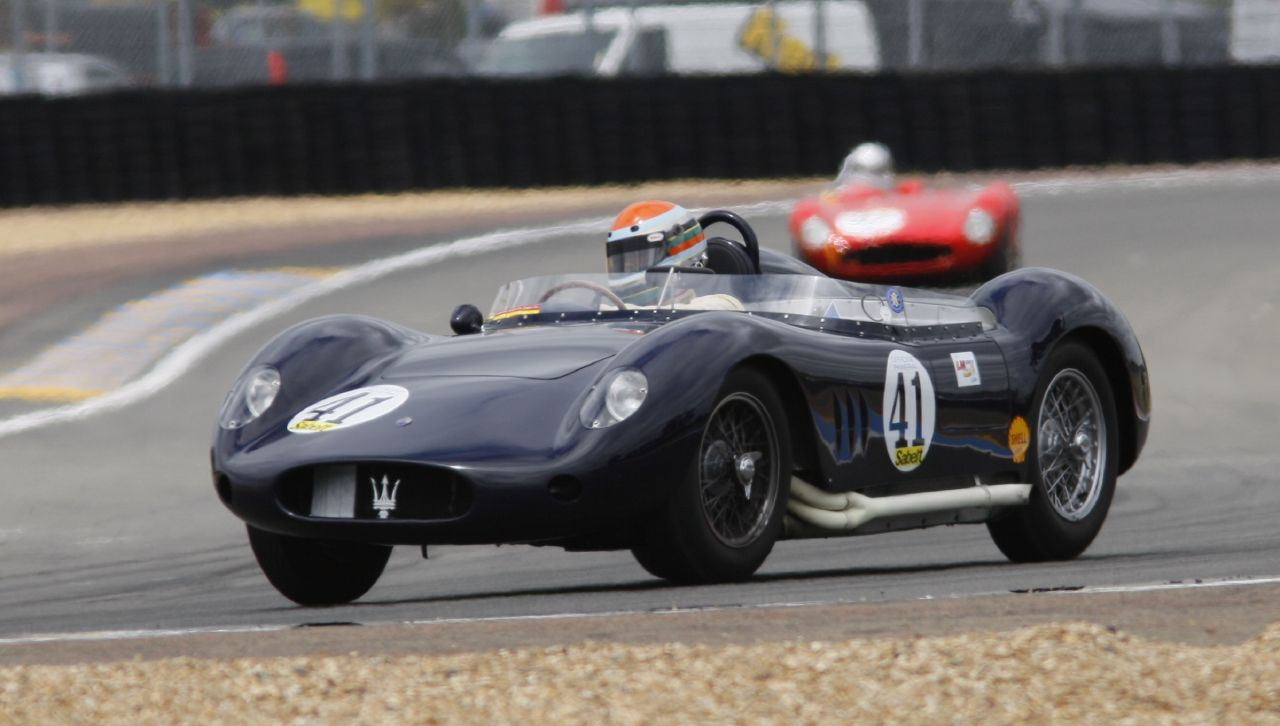
Maserati 250 SI

Maserati made the first three chassis internally, but outsourced a tubular chassis to Gilco which was modified by Maserati. The first five aluminium bodies were made by Celestino Fiandri, and the 23 final bodies were made by Medardo Fantuzzi.

The 200S debuted at the 1955 Imola Grand Prix, driven Franco Bordoni, but yielded disappointing results. The 200S was then entered at the 1955 Targa Florio driven by Giovanni Bracco and Bordoni along with a 150S. Both cars were forced to retire, with Maserati winning the race with a A6GCS driven by Francesco Giardini.

In 1956, Maserati entered three new 200S' at the Supercortemaggiore GP. Problems with the suspension would be resolved by fitting two cars with a De Dion tube attached to the differential with a sliding pin at the rear. The third car had a conventional (live) rear axle. The first car suffered damage in practicing round while the second one would retire during the race after only one lap. The third car would finish 27 seconds behind the winning Ferrari 250 Testa Rossa. At the Bara GP, the car would show more promising results by winning the race outright.

In 1957 a new variant called the Maserati 200SI, Sport Internazionale, was introduced to conform to international sports car racing rules. The SI featured a wider windscreen, wipers, doors and a perfunctory hood capable of keeping the rain out only when the car was parked rather than protecting the driver from the elements during a race. One of the 200SI (chassis 2407, originally #1672) was a converted 150S.

The 200S was then replaced by the 250S which featured an enlarged 2.5 L (2,498 cc) engine. Most of the 250S cars were 200S converted to 250S specifications: Four of the 200SI built were thus converted, while only two were built from the ground up. The 250S also proved uncompetitive.

== Technical Data ==
Technical data	200S
Engine:	Front mounted straight-four engine
Displacement:	1994 cm³
Bore x stroke:	92 × 75 mm
Max power at rpm:	187 hp (140 kW) at 7,500 rpm
Valvetrain:	Two overhead camshafts, 2 valves per cylinder
Compression:	9.8:1
Carburetor:	2 Weber 45DCO3
Gearbox:	4/5-speed manual transaxle
Suspension front:	Double wishbones, coil springs
Suspension rear:	De Dion axle, transverse leaf springs
Brakes:	Hydraulic drum brakes
Chassis and body:	Tubular steel chassis with aluminum body
Wheelbase:	225 cm
Dry weight:	670 kg
Top speed:	250 km/h

== Literature ==
- Karl Ludvigsen, Maserati 200S/200SI
