= Maserati 350S =

Italian racing cars

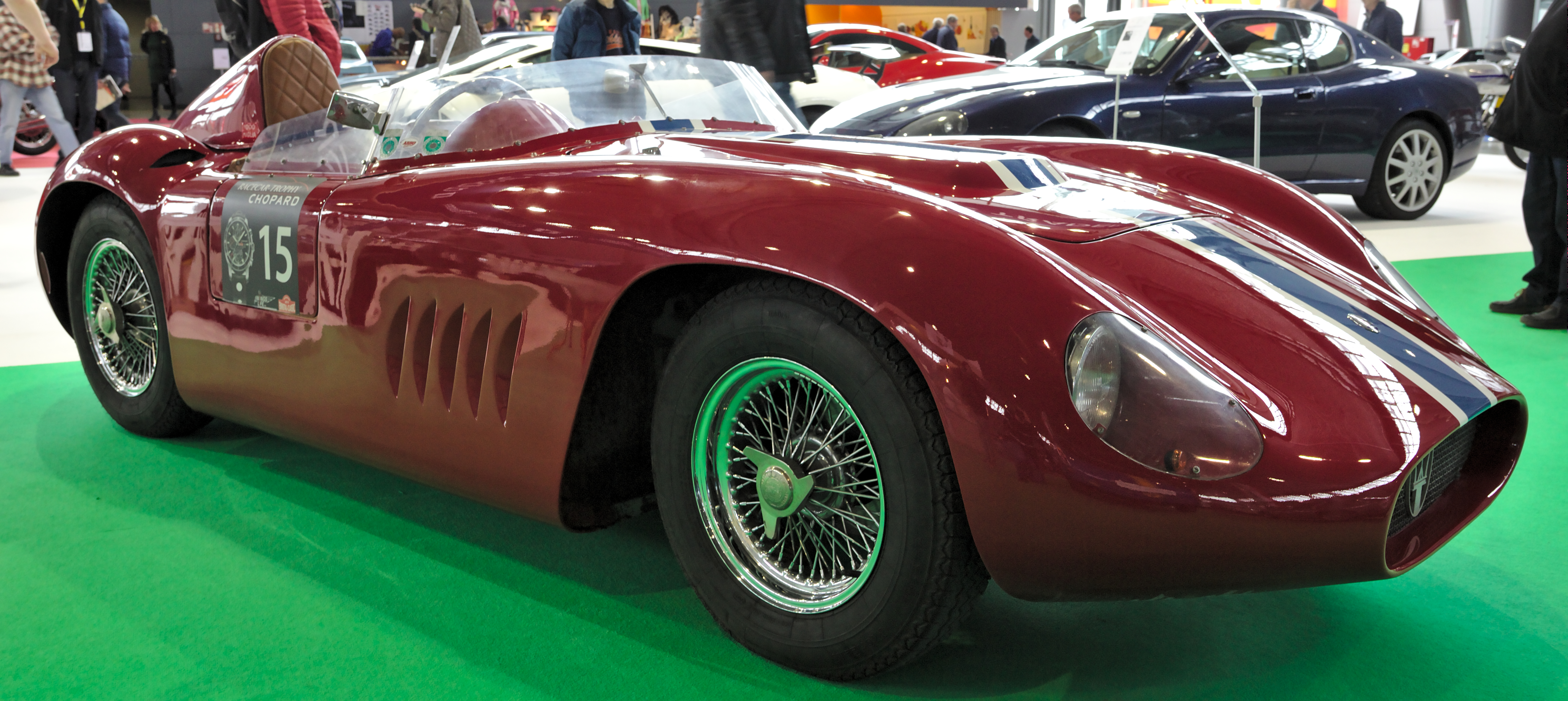

Overview
- Manufacturer: Maserati
- Production: 1955–1957; 3 built
- Assembly: Italy: Modena
- Designer: Medardo Fantuzzi

Body and chassis
- Class: Racing car
- Body style: 2-door barchetta
- Layout: F/R

Powertrain
- Engine: 3.5-litre I6
- Transmission: 5-speed manual

Chronology
- Predecessor: Maserati 300S
- Successor: Maserati 450S

Maserati 350S refers to a series of three racing cars made by Italian automobile manufacturer Maserati, built by Giulio Alfieri, with an aluminium body designed by Medardo Fantuzzi, both Maserati engineers. The 350S was built to experiment with a new straight-six engine while a new V8 engine was being developed at the factory.

== History ==
The engine used in the car was heavily revised for racing purposes and ultimately bore little resemblance to the engine it was based on. Two different variants were made: one with dry sump lubrication, and the other with wet sump lubrication. Power outputs of the engine varied from 290 to 325 hp (216 to 242 kW). The engine was installed in a tubular steel chassis based on that of the 300S, with additional strengthening.

The first chassis, #3501, was developed in 1955 using the chassis of a 300S, and the 3.5-litre straight-six engine under development for the future 3500 GT. It was crashed by Stirling Moss in the 1956 Mille Miglia, then rebuilt at the factory as the first 450S prototype and fitted with a V8 engine. During the 1960s it was acquired and heavily modified by Tom Meade, who had already done the same to #3503, only to be purchased and completely restored during the 1980s by its subsequent owner, Franco Lombardi.

Chassis #3502 was, like #3501, upgraded by the factory to the 450S specifications in 1956. It was then sold to Tony Parravano.

Chassis #3503 was built alongside #3502. It first used the straight-six, but later received a 3.5-litre V12 engine. It took part in several races in 1957 driven by Luigi Piotti, Roberto Bonomi, Hans Herrmann, and Jean Behra. In the early 1960s it was bought, rebuilt, and modified by Tom Meade, but was irreparably damaged in a 1966 road accident in California. A replica of this car, based on the chassis of a production Maserati 3500 GT, is occasionally exhibited at events such as the 1992 Mille Miglia.

== Technical Data ==
Technical data	350S
Engine:	Front mounted straight-six engine
Bore × stroke:	86 mm × 100 mm (3.39 in × 3.94 in)
Displacement:	3,485 cc (3.5 L; 212.7 cu in)
Max power at rpm:	290 hp (216 kW) at 6000 rpm
Valvetrain:	Dual overhead camshafts, 2 valves per cylinder
Compression:	9.5:1
Carburetor:	3 Weber 45 DCO3
Gearbox:	5-speed manual
Front suspension:	Double wishbones, coil springs, hydraulic dampers
Rear suspension:	De Dion axle, transverse leaf springs, hydraulic dampers
Brakes:	Hydraulic drum brakes
Chassis and body:	Tubular steel chassis with aluminium body
Wheelbase:	233 cm (91.7 in)
Dry weight:	800 kg (1,764 lb)
Top speed:	300 km/h (186 mph)
