= Maserati 300S =

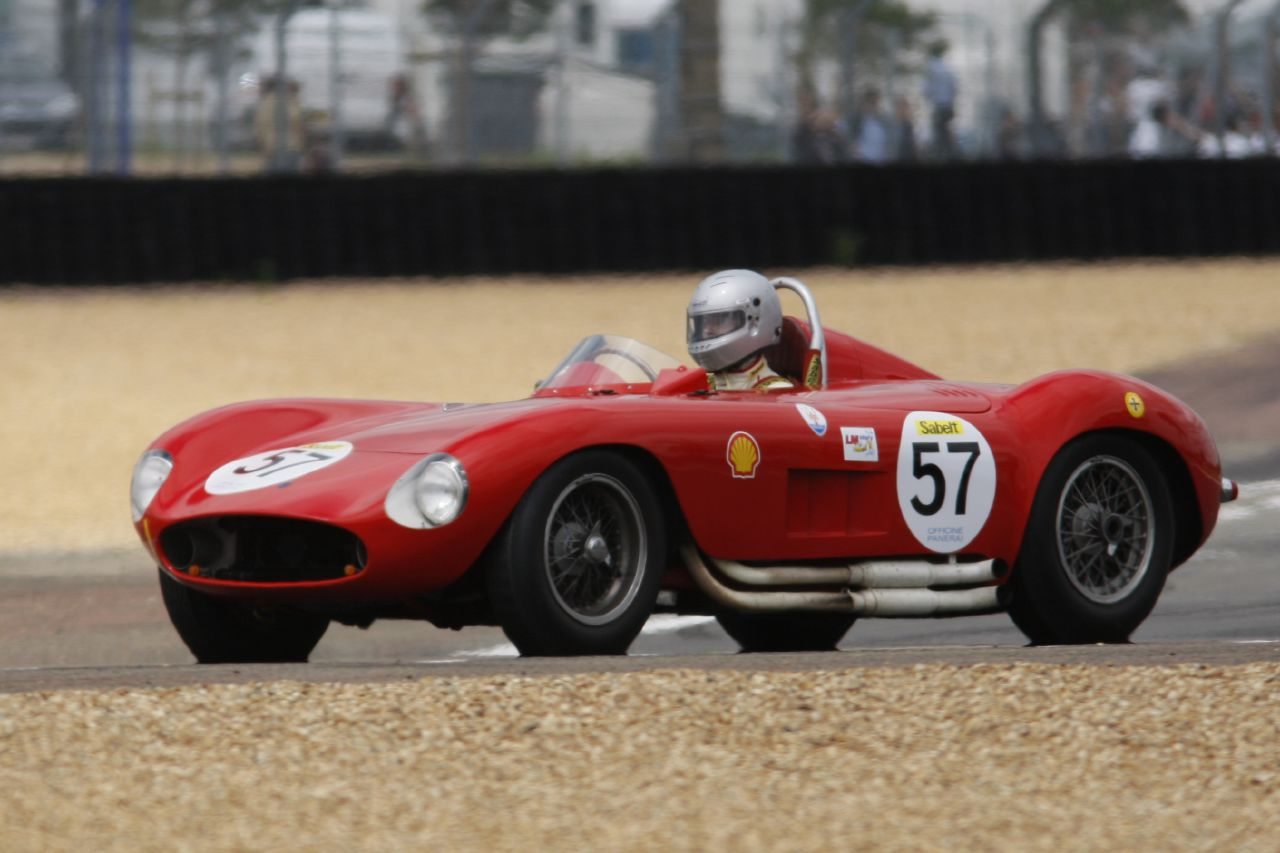
- 1955 Maserati 300S (serial no. 3051) at the Bugatti Circuit in 2007

Overview
- Manufacturer: Maserati
- Production: 1955-1958
- Designer: Medardo Fantuzzi

Body and chassis
- Body style: 2-door, convertible
- Layout: front engine, rear-wheel drive

Powertrain
- Engine: 6 cyl., 3.0 litre (2992cc) in-line engine
- Transmission: transverse four-speed gearbox

Dimensions
- Wheelbase: 2,310 mm (90.9 in)
- Length: 4,150 mm (163.4 in)
- Width: 1,450 mm (57.1 in)
- Height: 980 mm (38.6 in)
- Curb weight: 780 kg (1,720 lb)

Chronology
- Predecessor: Maserati 250F
- Successor: Maserati 450S

The Maserati 300S was a racing car produced by Maserati of Italy between 1955 and 1958 to compete in the FIA's World Sportscar Championship. Twenty-six examples were produced.

== Background ==
The 3.0-litre (approx 245 bhp (183 kW) at 6200 rpm) engine was based on the Straight-6 design of the Maserati 250F and incorporated a lengthened stroke developed by Vittorio Bellentani to increase the capacity from the original 2.5-litres. The compression ratio was reduced from 12:1 to 9.5:1, partly due to the FIA regulations requiring the engine to be run on road car fuel. It used three Weber carburettors, initially 42DCO3, later 45DCO3. A trellis structure was used instead of the tubular one of the 250F, and the aluminium body was by Medardo Fantuzzi. The brakes were the same as the 250F, precisely machined alloy drums with extensive finning. The suspension was also of the same design as the 250F but with some strengthening to cope with the rougher tracks and road surfaces encountered in WSC racing. New features for the 300S included the incorporation of a De Dion type rear axle, a transverse four-speed gearbox and two chain driven camshafts.

After a poor showing in the first season (1955) mainly due to mechanical malfunctions and development problems, the 300S won at the Nürburgring in 1956 and finished second overall. It was second to the Maserati 450S, and was followed by the Maserati 350S. After the major accident at Guidizzolo in the 1957 Mille Miglia, the last few examples of the 300S were sold to customers in the USA. Giulio Alfieri gave up an attempt to fit it with fuel injection. One 300S was developed with the new V12 engine, becoming the Maserati 350S.

Mark Knopfler, originally of Dire Straits, is a long term owner of a 300S and has raced the car in historic competitions. Additionally he featured the lines "If I was a Maserati, A red 300s, I'd ride around to your house, baby, Give you a driving test." in the song Red Staggerwing on his 2006 album All the Roadrunning.
