= Medardo Fantuzzi =

Italian automobile designer

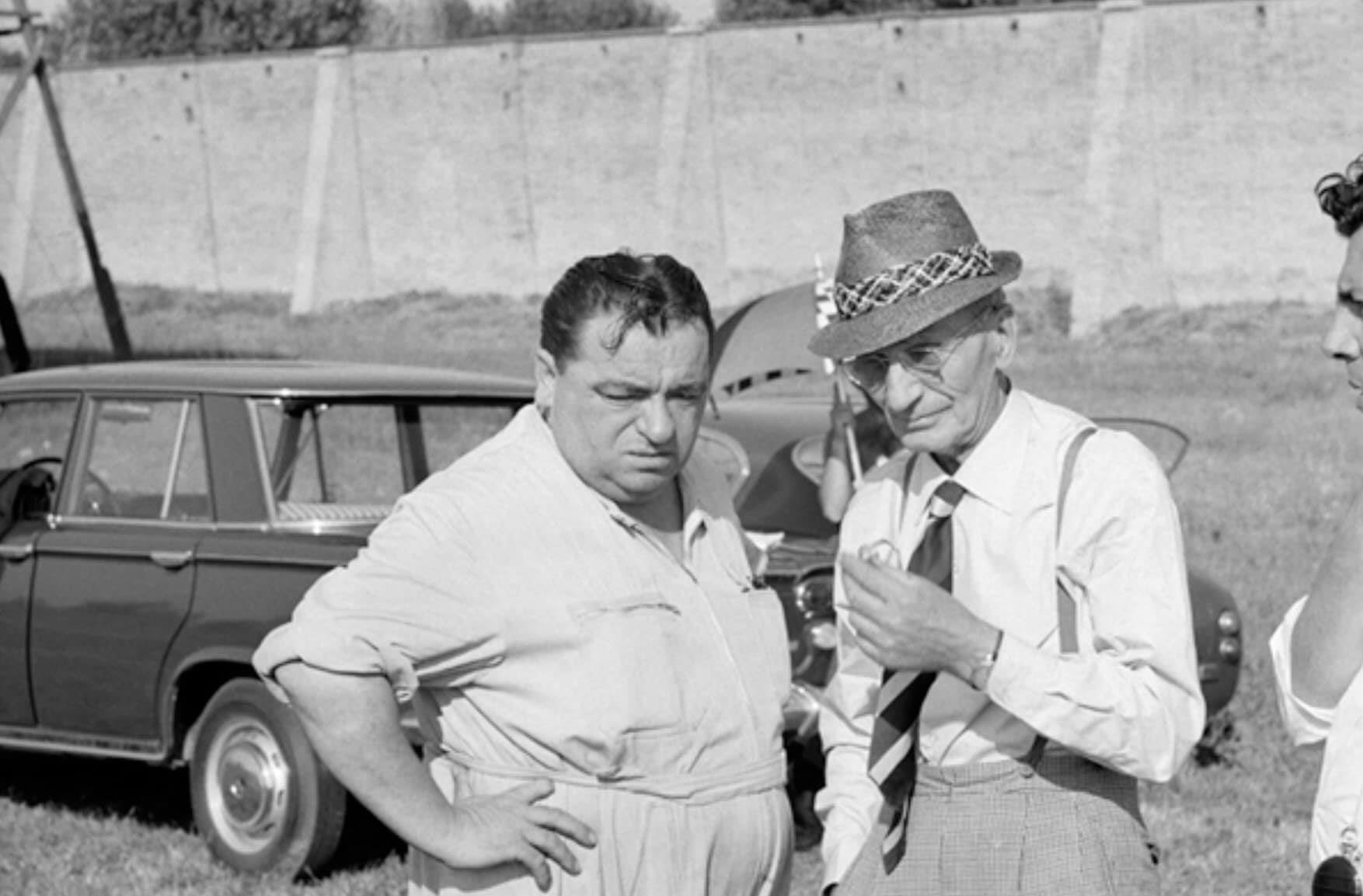
- Medardo (left) with Vittorio Jano in 1962
- Born: 1906; Bologna, Italy
- Died: 1986 (aged 79–80); Modena, Italy
- Engineering career
- Discipline: automotive engineering
- Practice name: Carrozzeria Fantuzzi

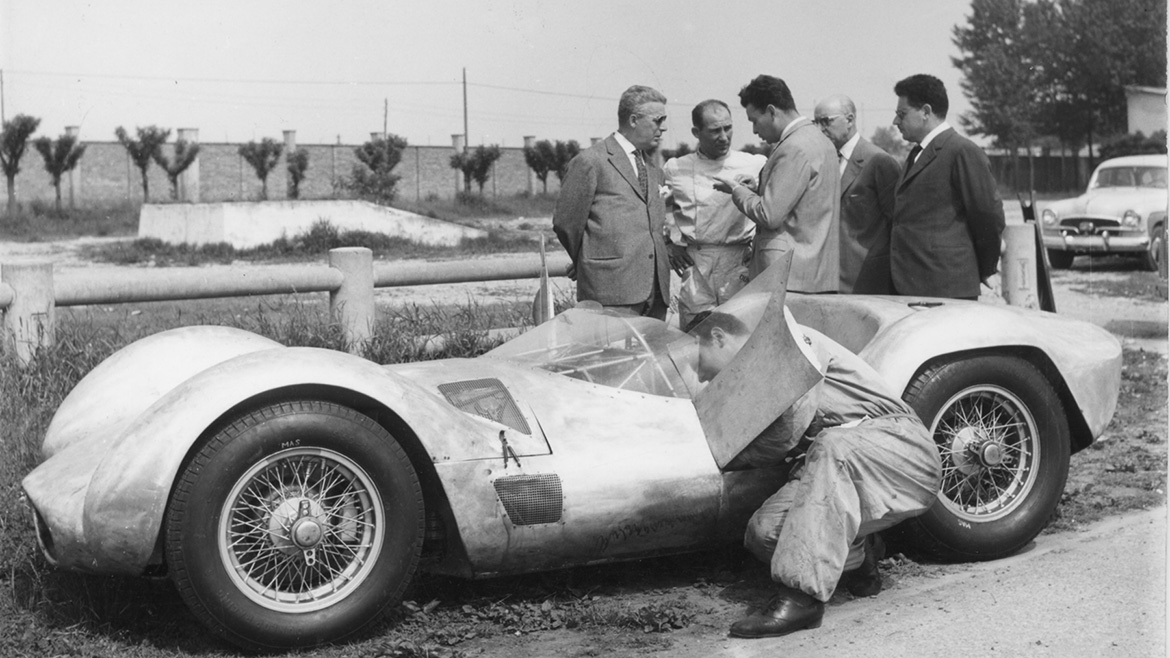
Medardo fixing a Maserati Tipo 61.

Medardo Fantuzzi (1906–1986) was an Italian automotive engineer, known for his Carrozzeria Fantuzzi body workshop.

Fantuzzi was born in Bologna in 1906. In 1939 he and his brother, Gino Fantuzzi, established Carrozzeria Fantuzzi. They started an affiliation with Maserati when they got involved in building the Maserati A6GCS (44 built 1953–55), Maserati 350S and Maserati 200S. Later, Medardo worked for Ferrari until 1966. He built the Pininfarina-penned Ferrari 250 Testa Rossa Spyder Fantuzzi (1961) and one-off Ferrari 250 GTE and a Ferrari 330.

Medardo's Carrozzeria Fantuzzi designed the spyder bodywork for the gold and black colored one-off 1964 model Ferrari 330 LM s/n 4381SA that Terence Stamp drove in Federico Fellini's "Spirits of the Dead" motion picture from 1968. The workshop refitted the original 330 LM body in 1978.

Fantuzzi also built, in the early 1960s, an OSCA Barchetta 1500cc 372FS for one of their mechanics. He also worked for De Tomaso, Scuderia Serenissima, AMS and Tecno. His son, Fiorenzo Fantuzzi, is still involved with the factory.

Fantuzzi died in Modena in 1986.

== Gallery ==
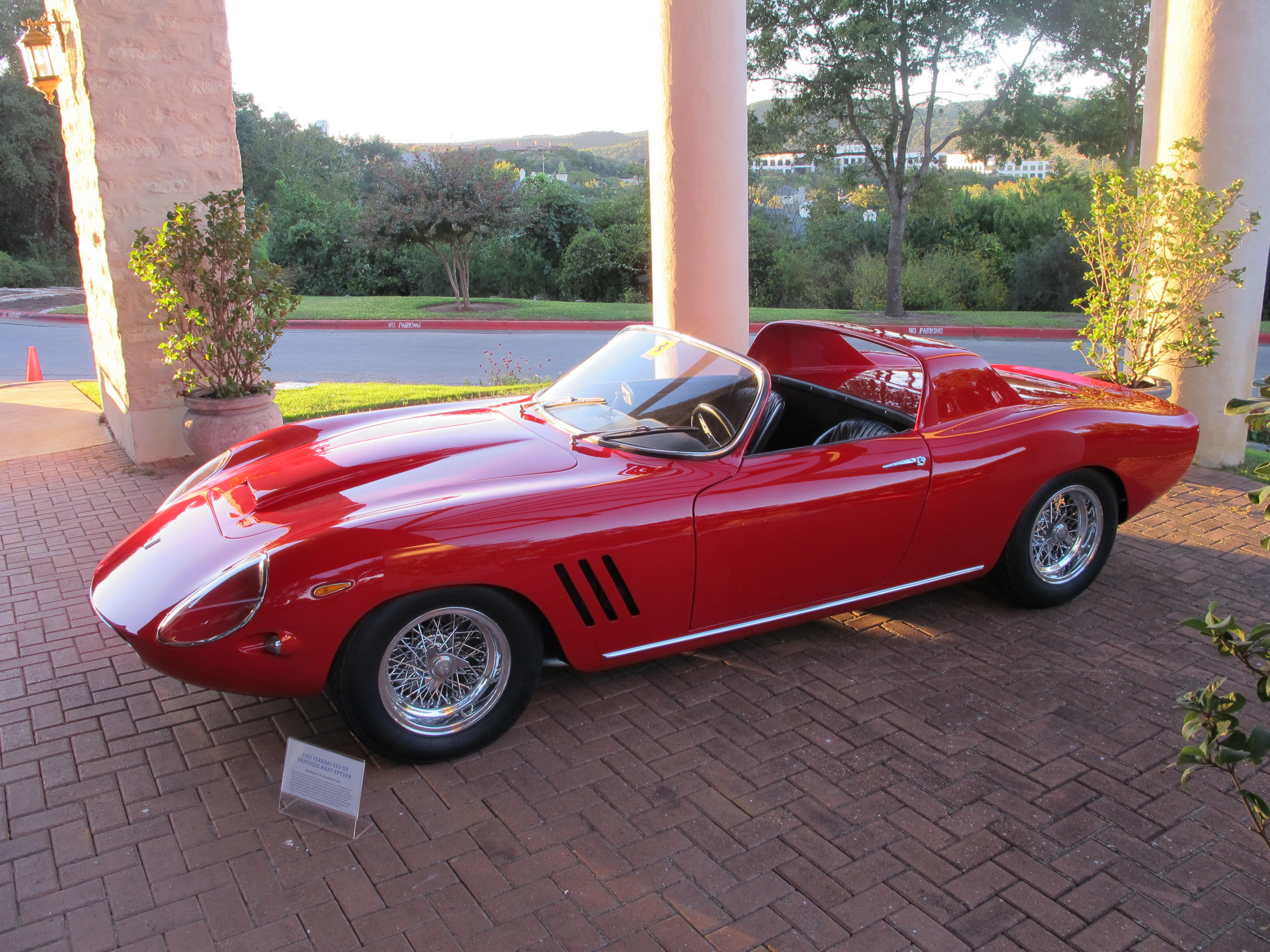
1965 model Ferrari 250 GTE Fantuzzi Spyder s/n 2235GT

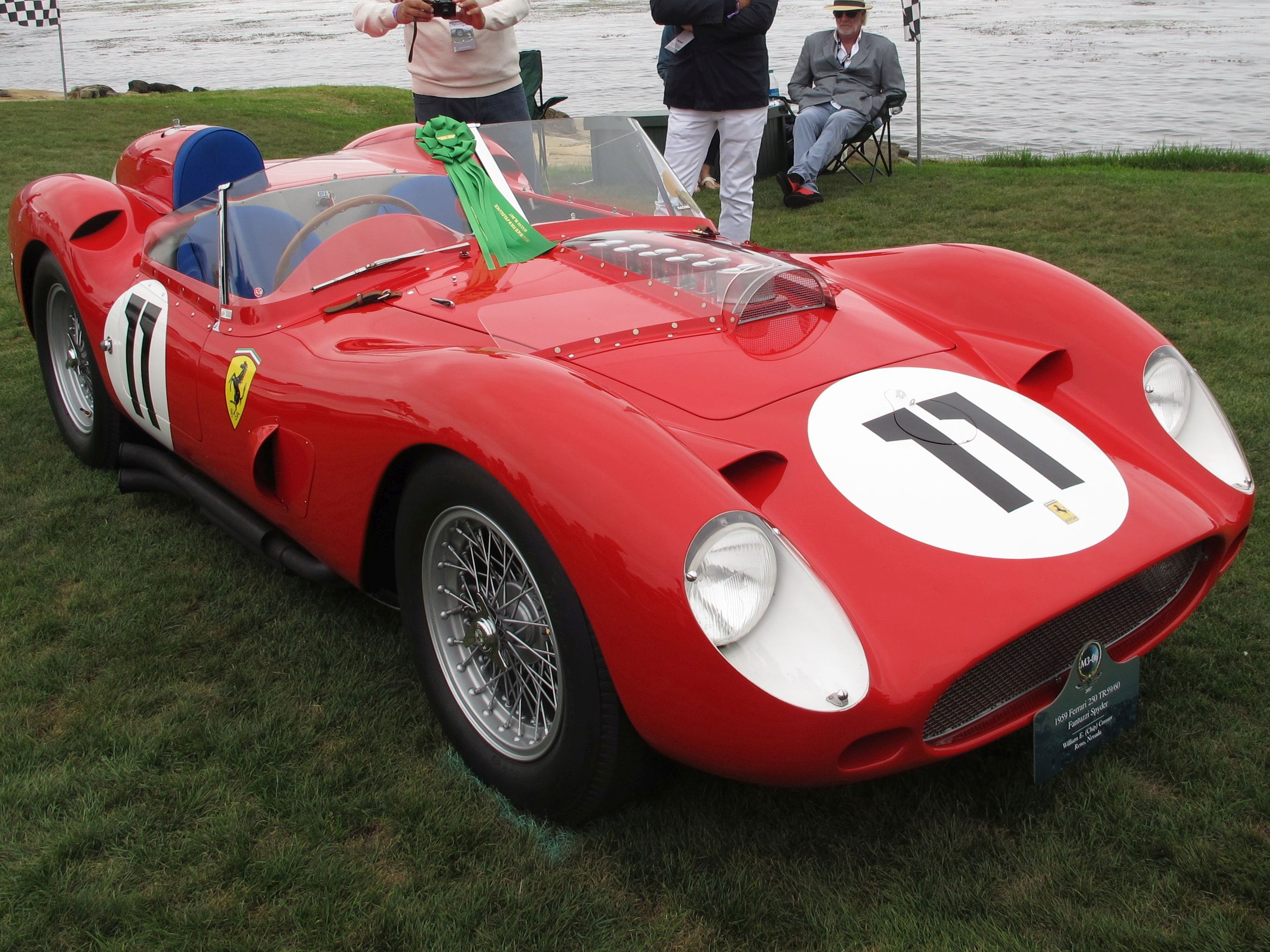
1959 model Ferrari Testa Rossa 59/60 Fantuzzi Spyder s/n 0774TR

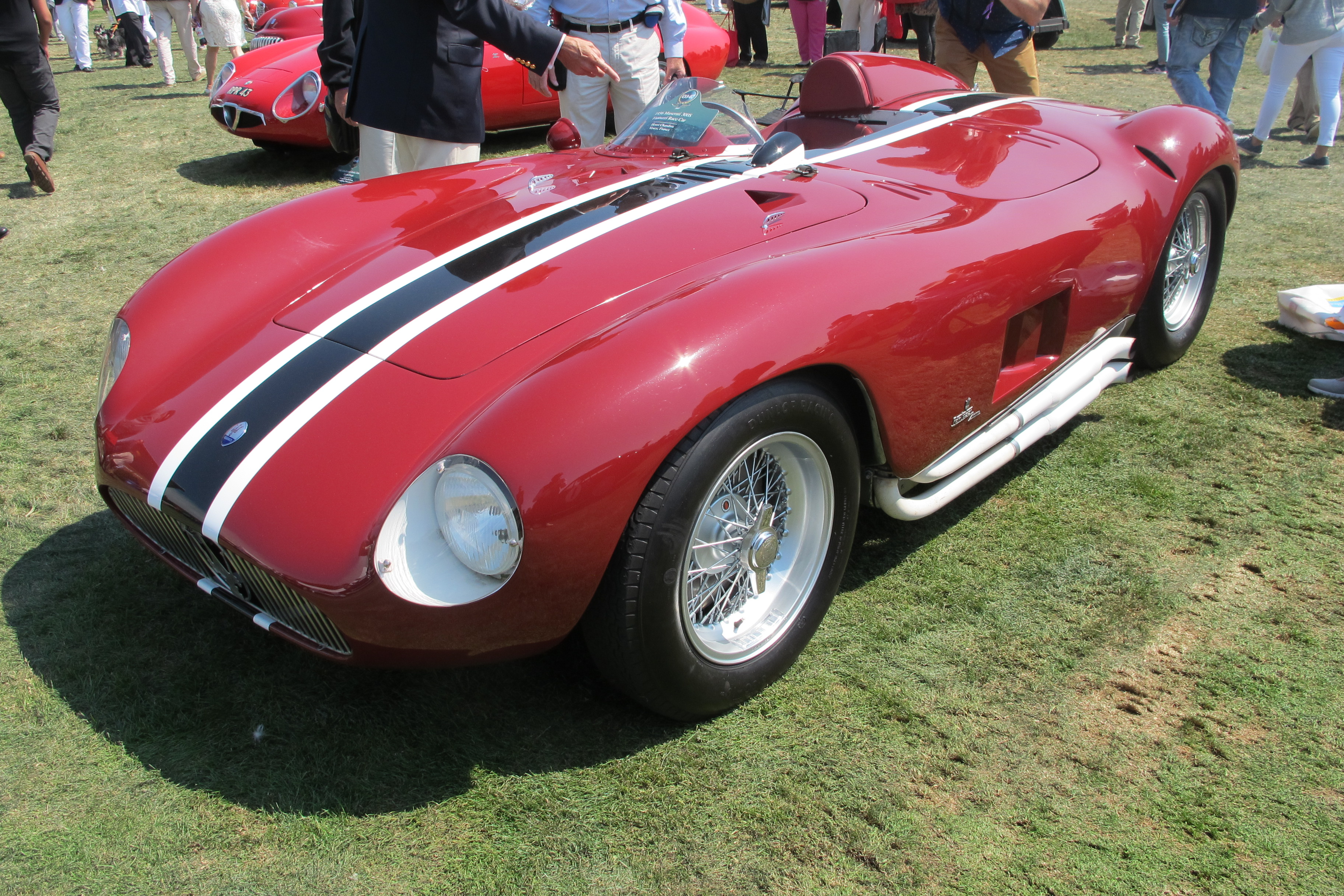
1955 model Maserati 300S with a body by Fantuzzi s/n 3058

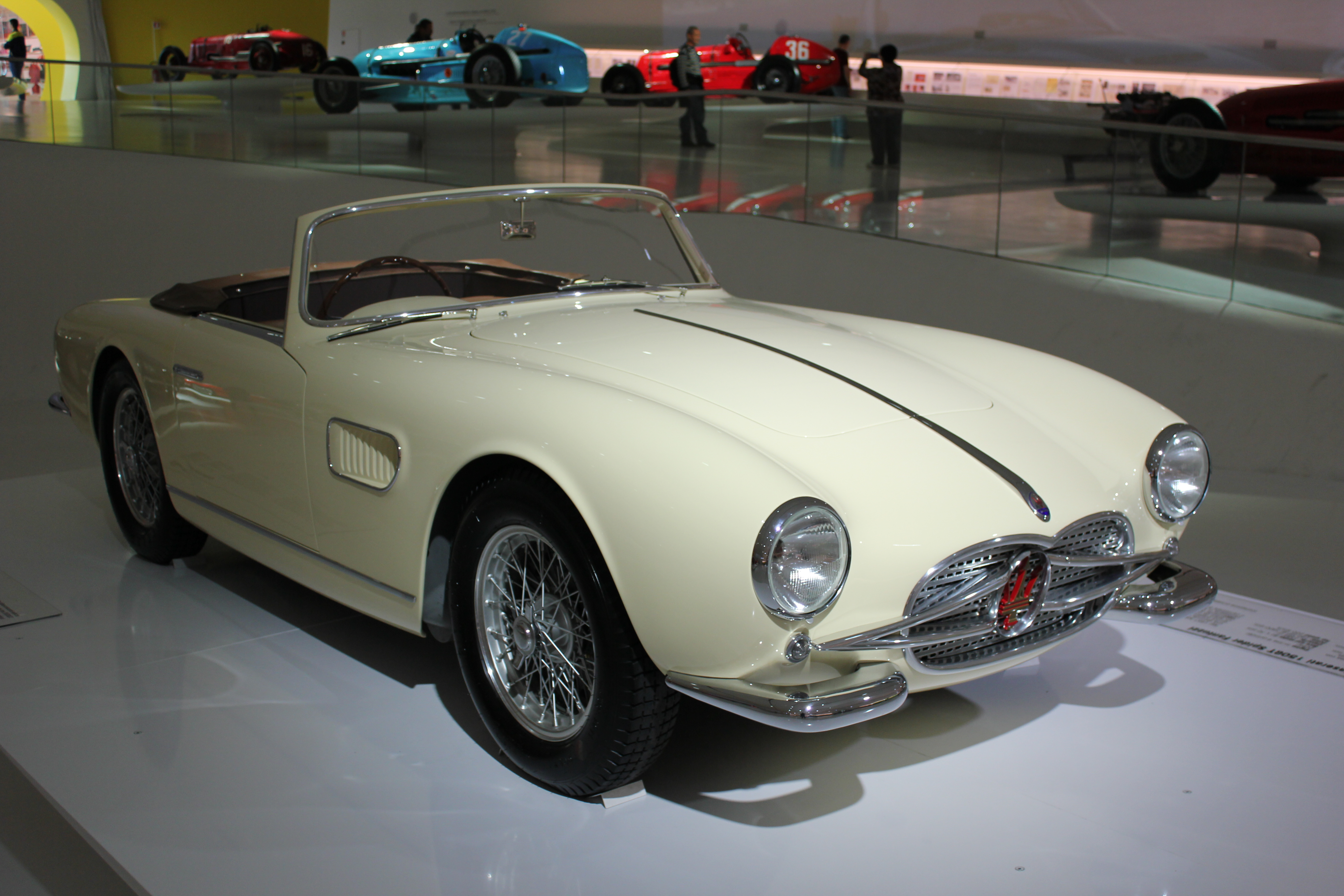
Maserati 150 GT designed and bodied by Fantuzzi
