= Giulio Alfieri =

Italian automobile engineer

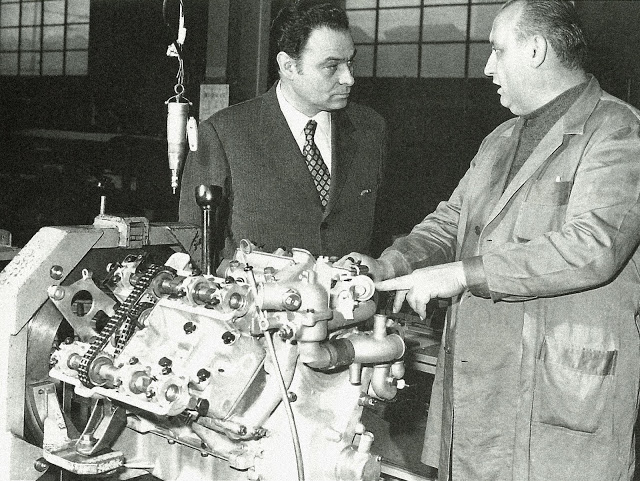
Giulio and the SM engine around 1969

Giulio Alfieri (14 July 1924 - 20 March 2002) was an Italian automobile engineer, affiliated with Maserati in Modena, Italy since 1953, where he was central to the development of racing and production cars in the 1950s, 1960s and 1970s.

Alfieri was born in Parma. After graduating from the Politecnico of Milan, he first worked on steam turbines for the shipping industry Cantieri Navali of Tirreno, in Genoa, before joining the automaker Innocenti in 1949.

Employed in September 1953 by Adolfo Orsi, Alfieri joined the technical staff of Maserati alongside Gioacchino Colombo, Vittorio Bellentani and two others.

He was best known for the Maserati 3500 GT design (1957) and the Maserati Birdcage (1961), both employing the superleggera lightweight body.

Alfieri worked on the six- and eight-cylinder engines used in the Maserati A6 (1955), Maserati 250F (1957), as well as V8 racing engines, later to be used as a basis for the V6 of Maserati Merak and Citroën SM (1969).

Alfieri also developed the prototype 260 hp (190 kW) 4.0 L V8 engine for the SM, tested over 12,000 kilometers, proving that the capabilities of the chassis could easily accommodate a 50% increase in power. The engine was then removed and preserved, while the rest of the car was destroyed by Alejandro de Tomaso. The SM Club of France created a replica of this car using the actual engine from the original and displayed it at the 2010 Rétromobile show in Paris.

He also contributed to V12 prototype engines intended for use in Cooper-Maserati for Formula One racing (1966).

Alfieri produced a chassis design for the Momo Mirage, a few of which were then produced by Automobili Stanguellini before the project was cancelled.

As Maserati was taken over in 1975 by Alejandro de Tomaso, Alfieri ended over 20 years of service for the Modenese company. De Tomaso had tried to buy Maserati in 1968 from the Orsi family. This failed primarily on Giulio Alfieri's resistance. After de Tomaso bought Maserati in August 1975, he dismissed Alfieri on the day of taking over the business. He was succeeded by Aurelio Bertocchi, the son of longtime Maserati test driver Guerrino Bertocchi.

Alfieri later worked for Lamborghini with Ubaldo Sgarzi on V8 and V12 engines (1975–1987).

He died in Modena in 2002.

== Gallery: Cars of Alfieri ==
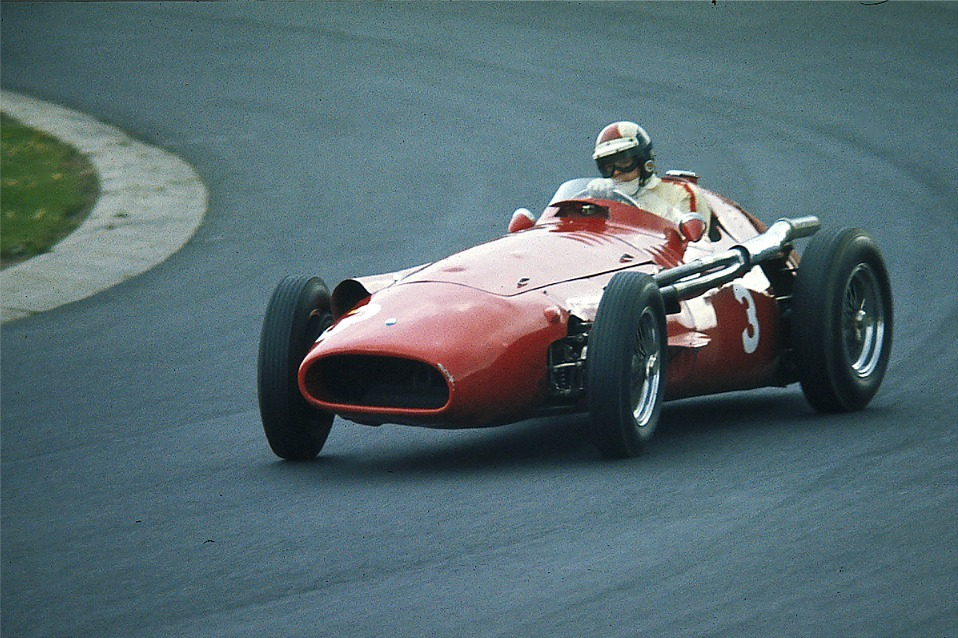
Maserati 250F

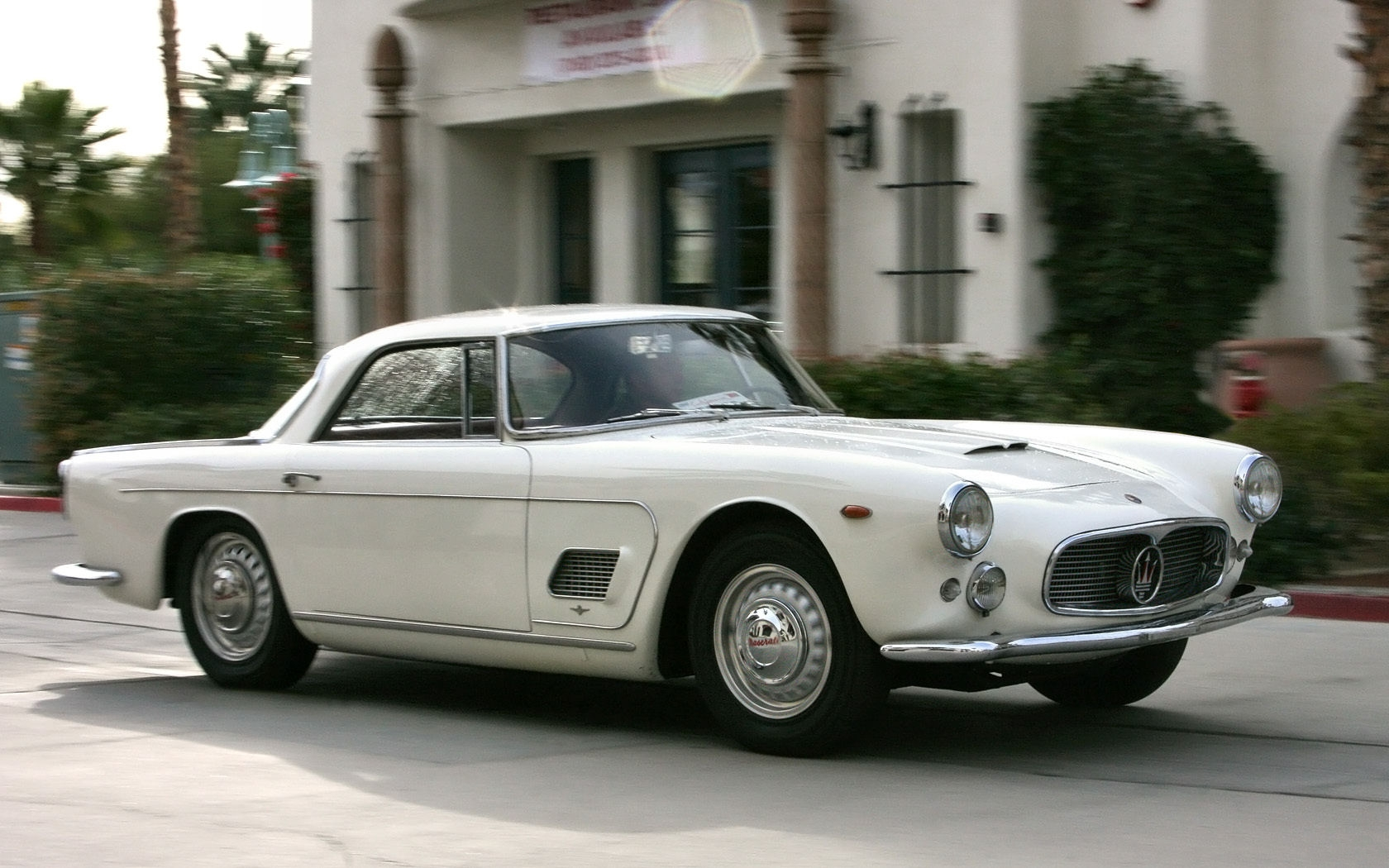
Maserati 3500 GT

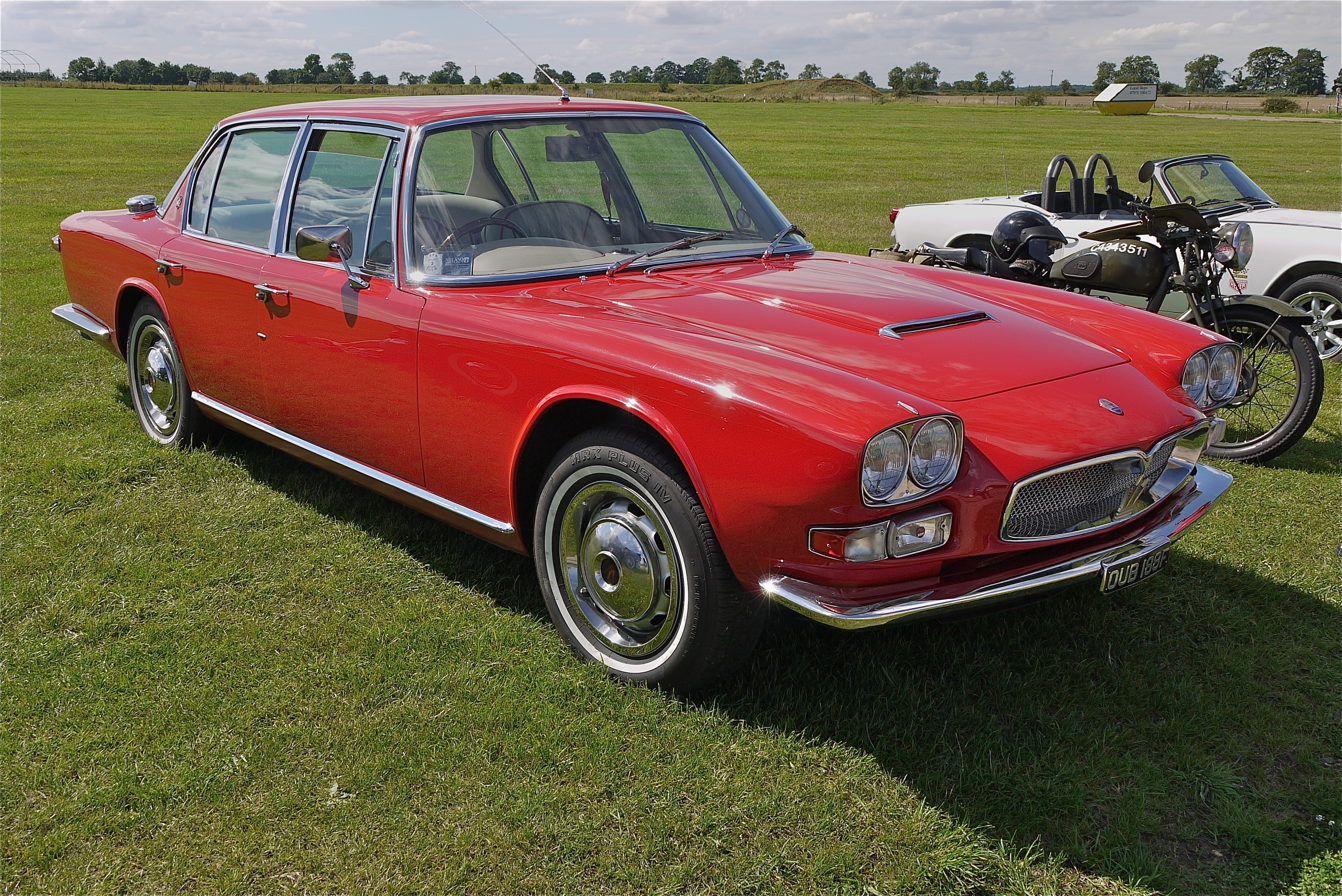
Maserati Quattroporte I

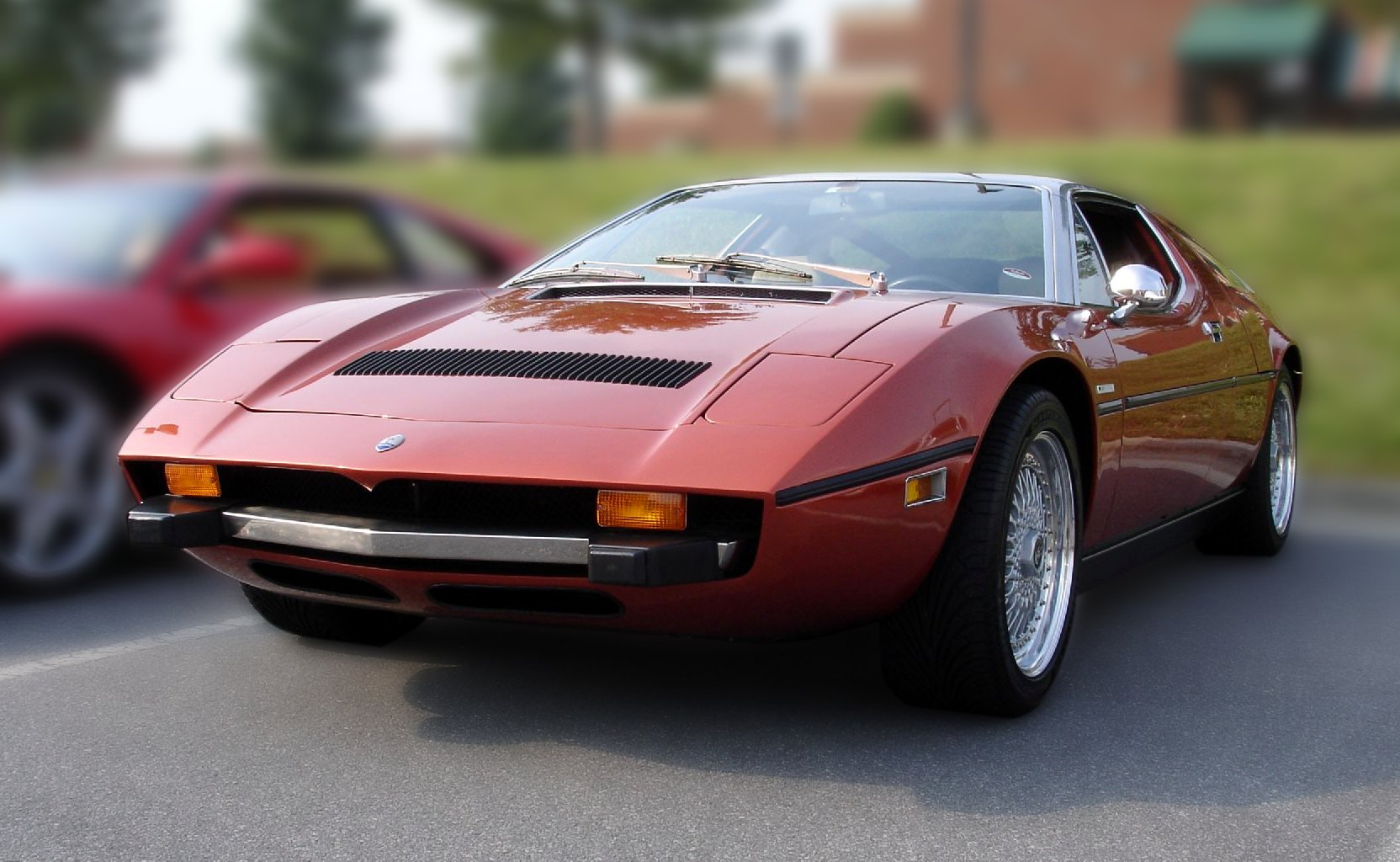
Maserati Bora

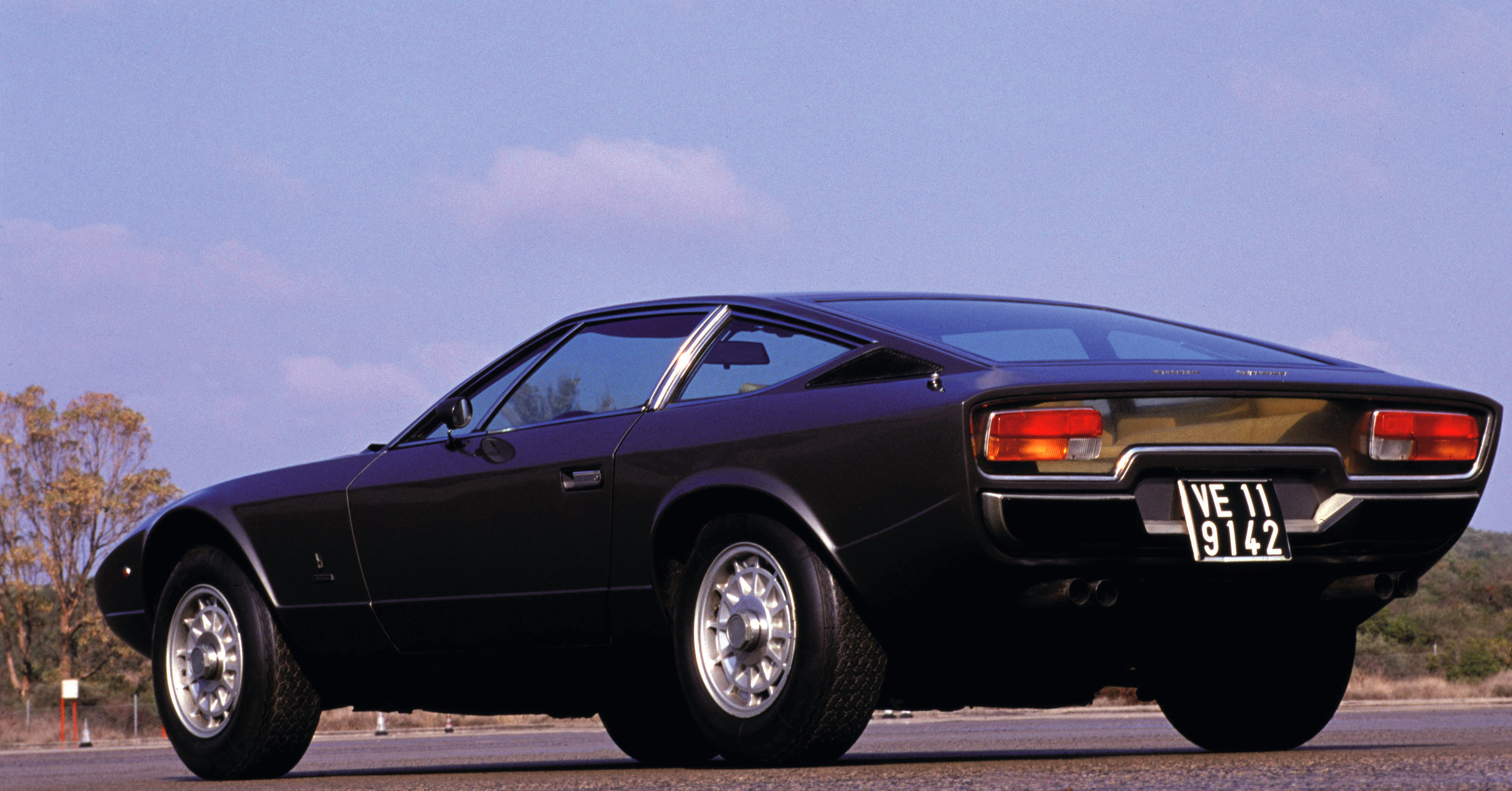
Maserati Khamsin

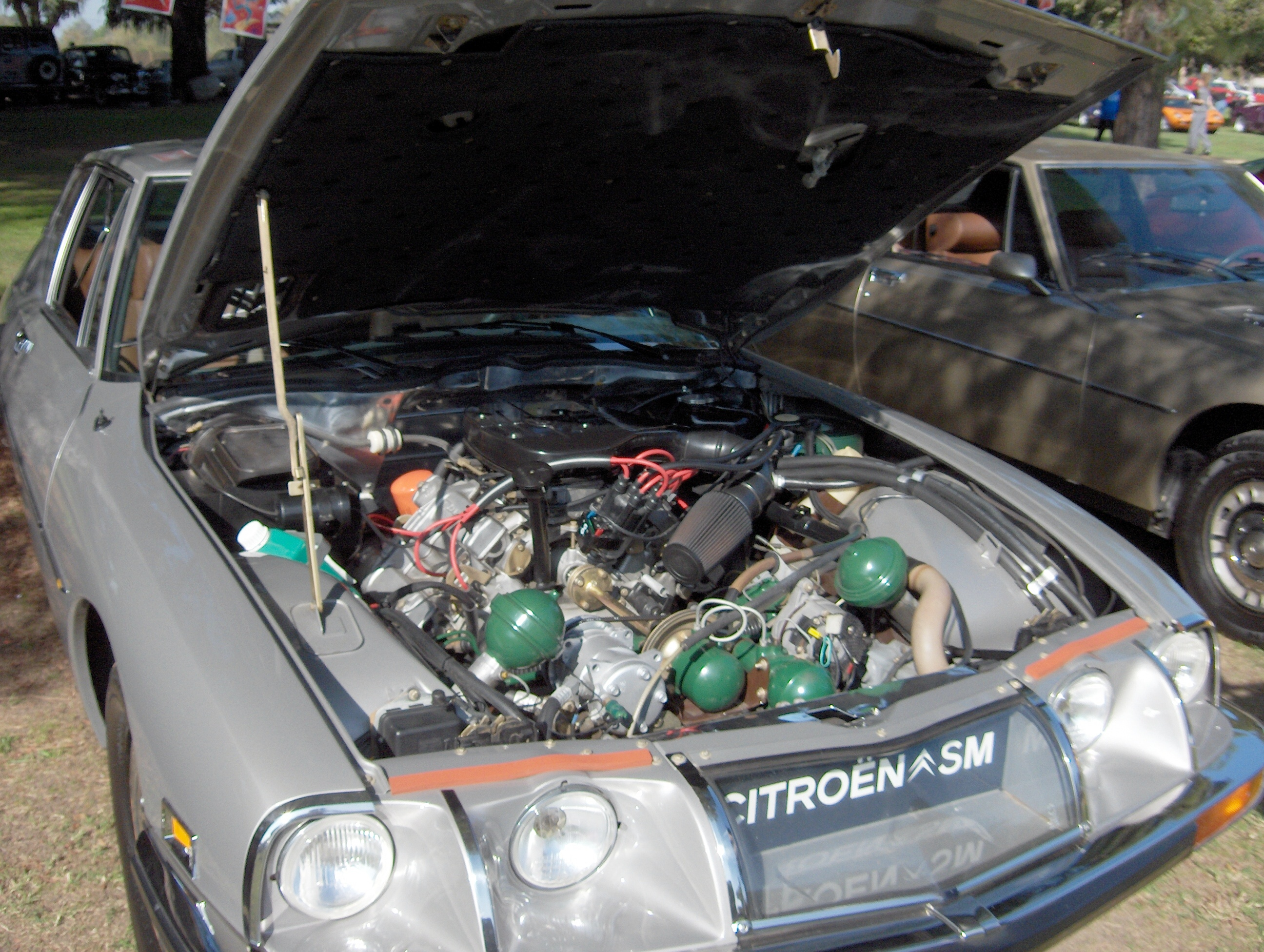
Motor of Citroën SM

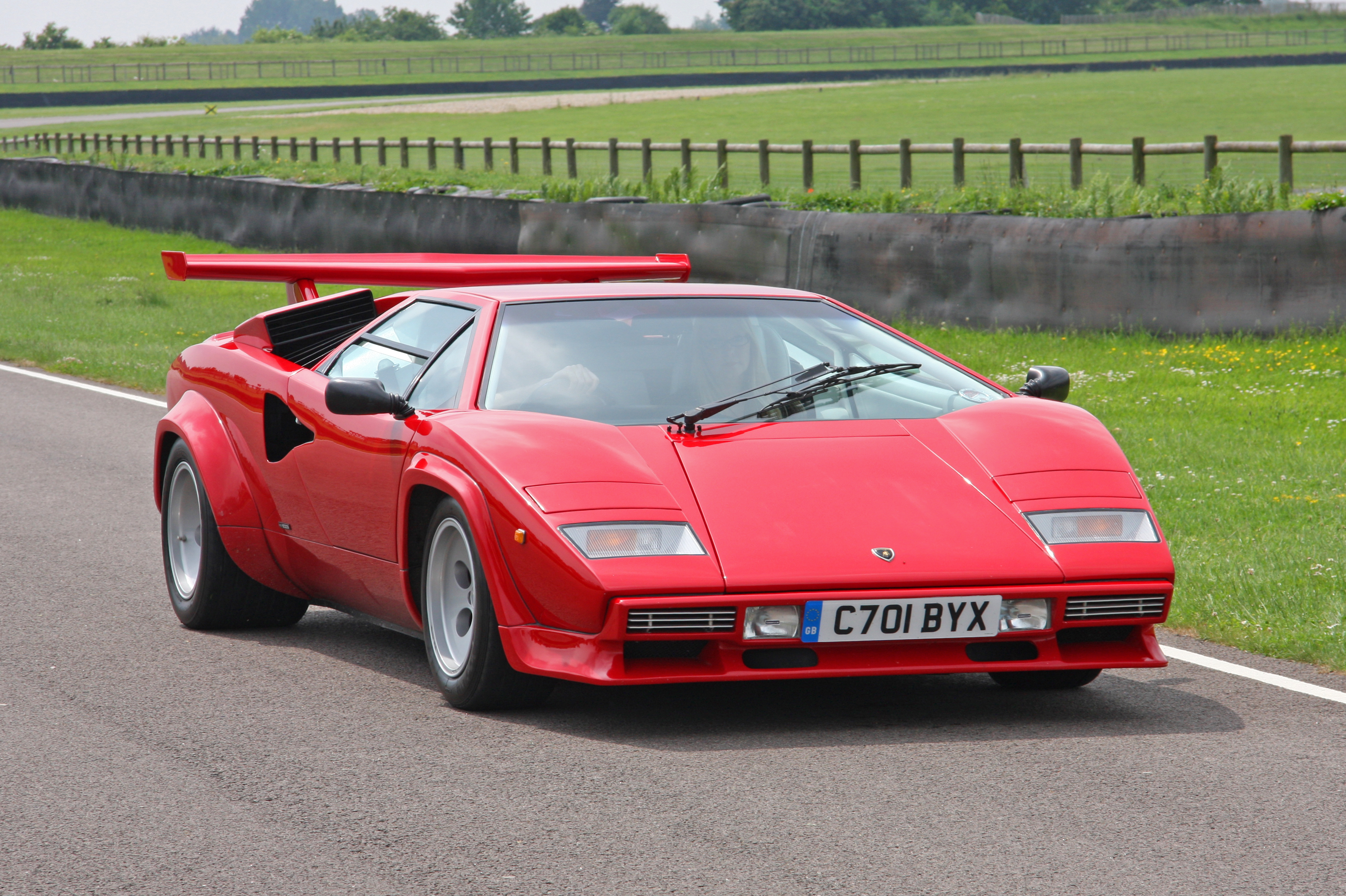
Lamborghini Countach S
