= Gioacchino Colombo =

Italian automobile engineer (1903–1988)

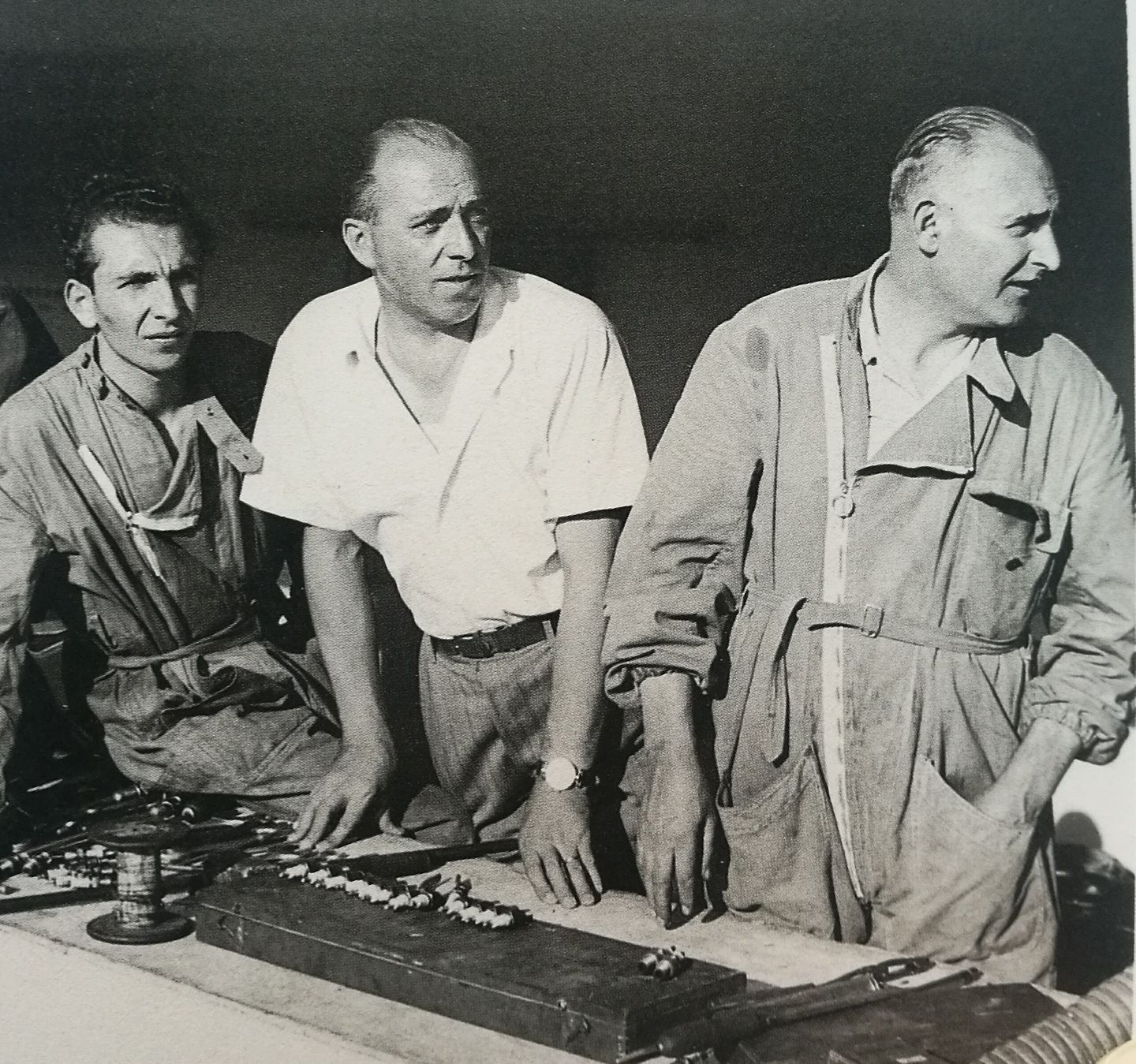
Gioacchino Colombo (in the middle)

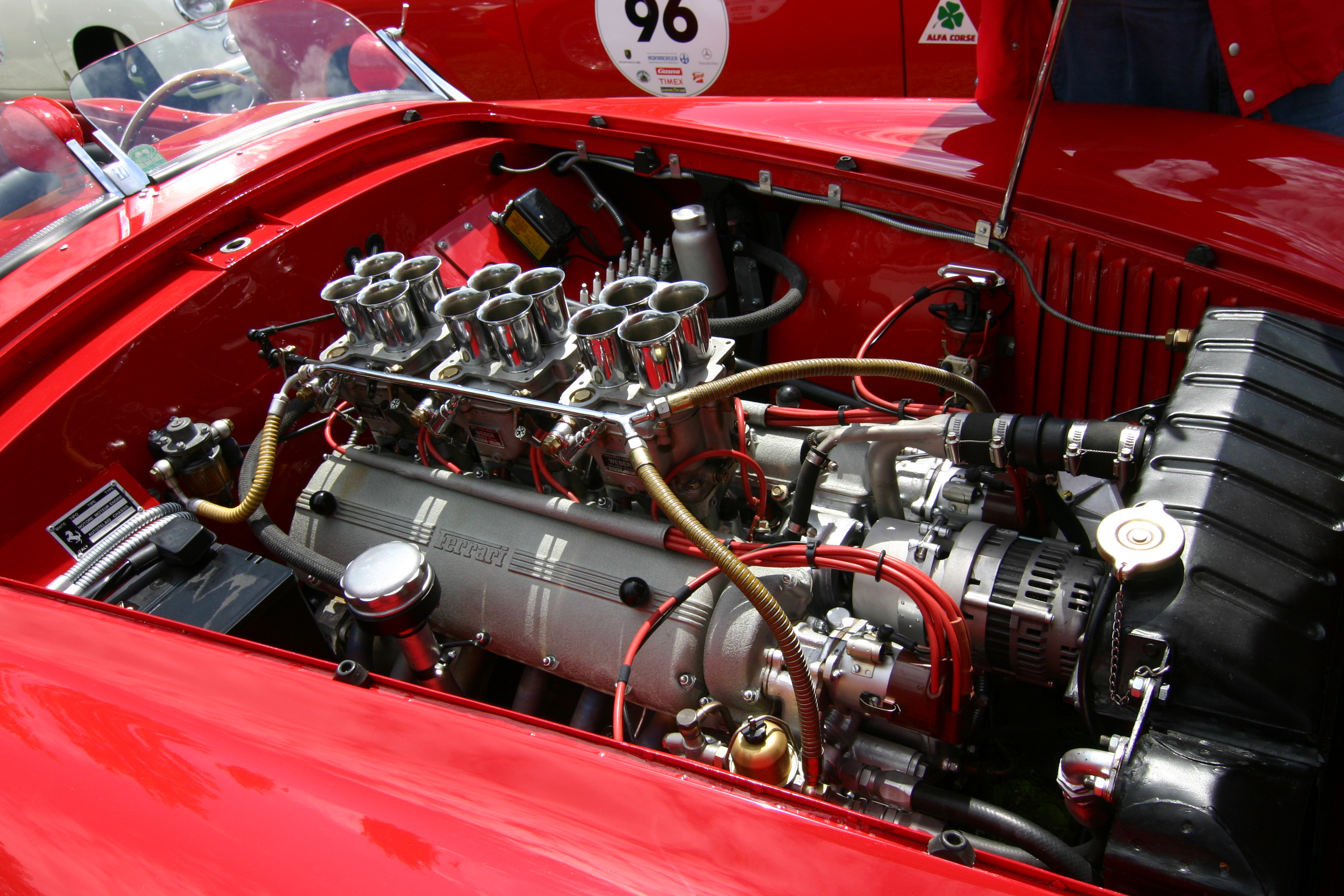
Ferrari 212 2.6 L engine

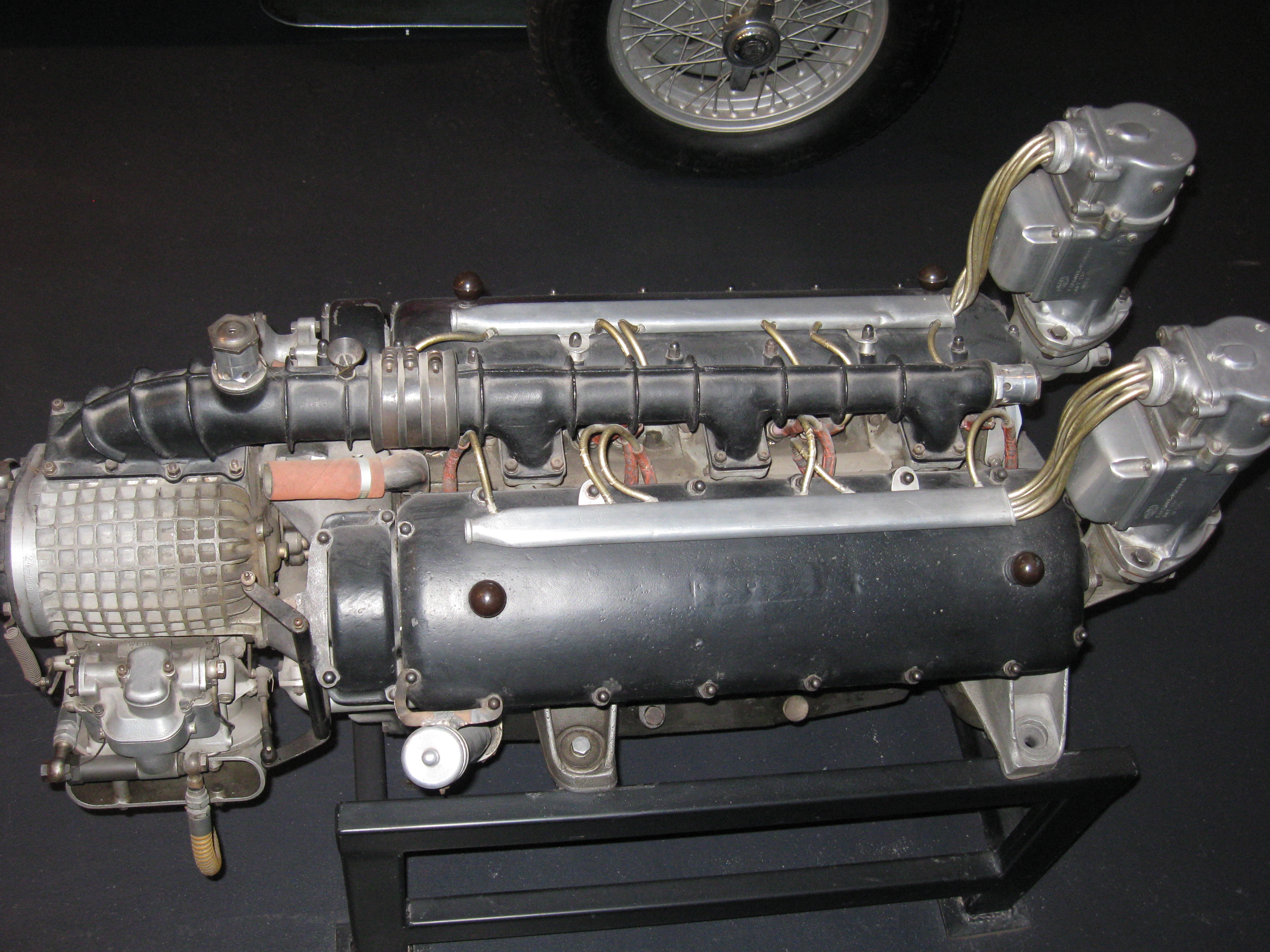
Colombo's supercharged 125 F1 engine

Gioacchino Colombo (9 January 1903 – 24 April 1988) was an Italian automobile engine designer, known for his work at Alfa Romeo, Ferrari, and a post-WWII restarted Bugatti. He is best known for his Ferrari-Colombo V12, first used in a tiny 1.5 litre displacement in Ferrari racing cars but enlarged in displacements up to 4.8 L and produced for Ferrari road cars and endurance racing cars for more than 40 years.

== Biography ==
Born in Legnano, Colombo began work as an apprentice to Vittorio Jano at Alfa Romeo. In 1937, he designed the 158 engine for the Alfetta and caught the attention of Enzo Ferrari, who asked Colombo to design a small V12 for his Ferrari marque's racing and road cars.

The first Ferrari-Colombo engine appeared on 11 May 1947 as a tiny 1.5 litre V12, first used in the Tipo 125, 159, and then 166 sports cars. Colombo's most successful work for Ferrari, this engine, also known simply as the "Colombo engine", was enlarged in displacements up to 4.8 L and produced for road cars and endurance racing cars for more than 40 years. These included the 3.0 litre Ferrari 250 racing, sports, and GT cars.

Colombo's engine was not as successful in Formula One racing. After stunning early success in the 166, the engine was supercharged for use in Formula One but failed to perform well. Unsatisfied with the results, Ferrari brought in fellow designer Aurelio Lampredi to create a large naturally aspirated V12, which replaced Colombo's.

Colombo left Ferrari in 1950 and returned to Alfa Romeo, where he oversaw that company's racing efforts - including the Formula One World Championship success that year of Nino Farina and, in 1951, of Juan-Manuel Fangio. In late 1952, Colombo moved on to Maserati, where he created the 250F Grand Prix car. Two years later, Colombo headed to newly restarted Bugatti to work on the 251. He then worked for MV Agusta from 1957 to 1970.

Colombo died in Milan in 1988.

== Bibliography ==
- Colombo, Gioachino (1985). Origins of the Ferrari Legend. Sparkford Nr. Yeovil, Somerset BA22 7JJ, England: Haynes Publishing Group. ISBN 0-85429-624-7.
