= Vittorio Bellentani =

Italian engineer and racer (1906–1968)

Vittorio Bellentani (March 11, 1906 – March 26, 1968) was an Italian automobile engineer and racing driver.

== Biography ==
Born in Modena, he studied in Germany at University of Freiburg before joining Enzo Ferrari in 1940, where he first worked on the Auto Avio Costruzioni 815 (1940–46).

He subsequently worked for Maserati (1950–55), developing the Maserati A6 (A6GCM 1952; A6SSG 1954), and Maserati 250F, that had been initiated by Gioacchino Colombo who left the company in 1955. Bellentani continued as a consulting engineer for Ferrari (1956–63) on cars as Ferrari 412 S (1957) and the 1-litre ASA "Ferrarina" (1962). He also worked for the Bellentani Riccardo Modena (B.R.M.) company (1955–1957), which had been formed by his brother Riccardo Bellentani. B.R.M. was mostly involved in two-stroke engines, and continued to operate under Riccardo's son, Antonio Bellentani.

Bellentani died in Modena in 1968.
