= Gianni Marzotto =

Italian racing driver and entrepreneur (1928–2012)

Giannino Marzotto
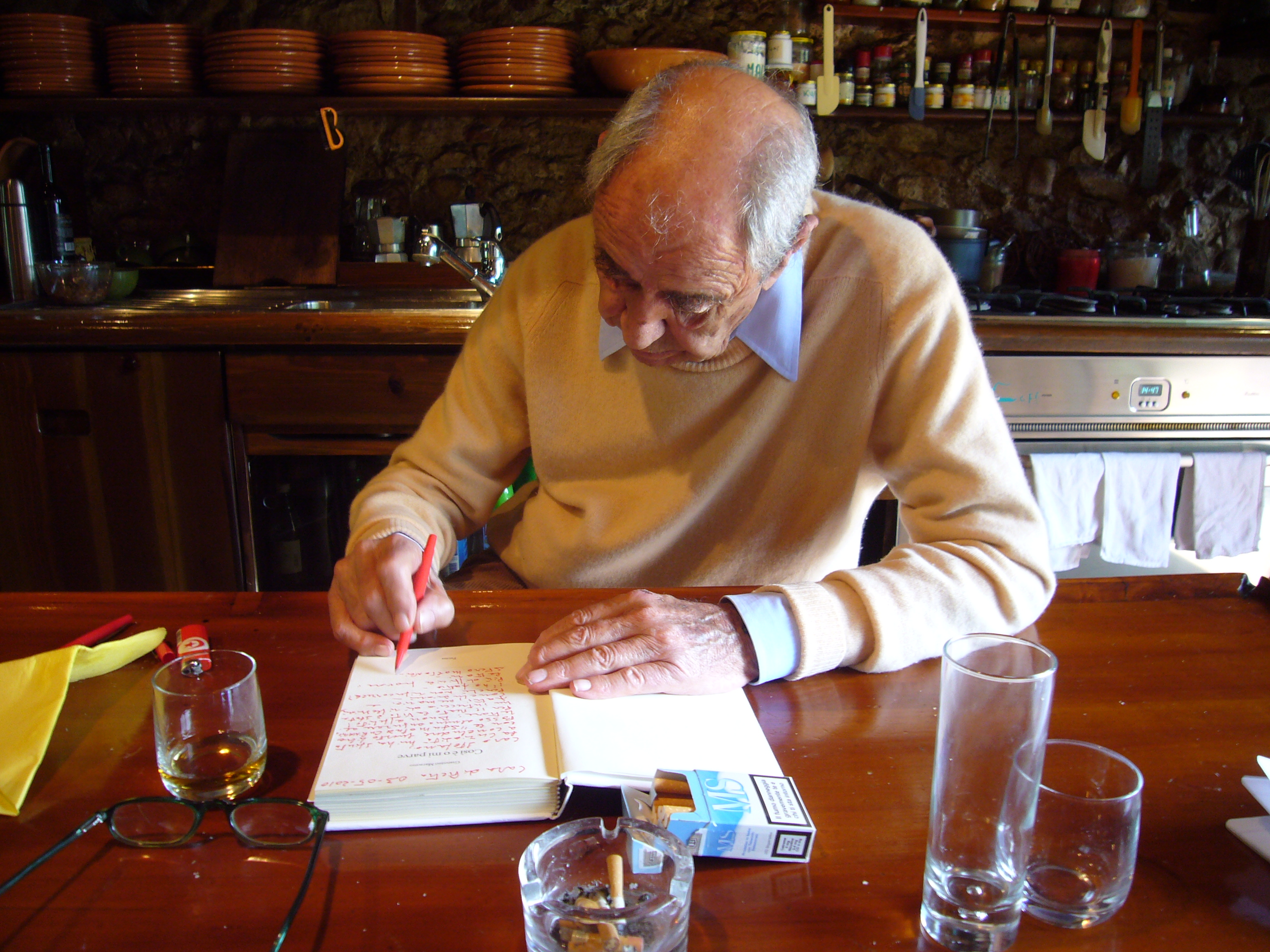
- Marzotto in 2010
- Nationality: (Italy) Italian
- Born: 13 April 1928 Valdagno, Italy
- Died: 14 July 2012 (aged 84) Padua, Italy
- Relatives: Count Gaetano Marzotto

Championship titles
- 1950 Mille Miglia; 1953 Mille Miglia
24 Hours of Le Mans career
- Years: 1953
- Teams: Scuderia Ferrari
- Best finish: 5th (1953)

Count Giannino Marzotto (13 April 1928 in Valdagno, Italy – 14 July 2012) was an Italian racing driver and entrepreneur. Marzotto served as President of the Mille Miglia Club and won the Mille Miglia race in 1950 and 1953.

== Career ==
He was one of four sons of Count Gaetano Marzotto. Soon after his 20th birthday, he entered his father's Lancia Aprilia in the Giro di Sicilia and finished second in class (16th overall). Marzotto met Enzo Ferrari in 1948 with the task to build a 2L Grand Touring Coupe, which is believed to be the fourth customer car even built by Ferrari, a Ferrari 166 Inter. He started racing with an Aprilia for an Italian National Championship Event in 1948. Marzotto drove the Aprilia for ten races over three years.

In 1950, he and his three brothers, Vittorio, Umberto and Paolo all entered the 1950 Mille Miglia, driving Ferraris. Gianni started last and would score his first major success when he piloted a Ferrari 195 S to victory. Marco Crosara accompanied him. This was the famous double-breasted victory that Marzotto achieved wearing a double-breasted brown suit. He won fame not just for winning but for his attire which seemed to catch the spirit of the Italian fans. But this might not have happened at all. Upon testing his recently purchased Ferrari before the race, Giannino found it nothing compared to the previous car he drove. Suspecting some deviousness on the part of Scuderia Ferrari, he returned to the Maranello to confront Enzo Ferrari. It was explained that Luigi Bazzi, Ferrari's technician, had purposely strangled the engine to protect the young driver. Somewhat embarrassed by this, Enzo promised to see that car would be prepared for the race personally. Marzotto decided for the following season; he would improve on the 195 S, with an all-new design of his own based on Ferrari 166 with an engine from a Ferrari 212. Featuring a low-slung body and rounded shape, the car went well in the 1951 Mille Miglia but retired due to problems with the rear axle.

In 1951, Marzotto undertook a limited campaign of Formula 2 races for the family team, Scuderia Marzotto, as well as in the works Ferrari, with some success. He won the Grand Prix de Rouen-les-Essarts, and visited the podium in the Gran Premio di Roma.

Marzotto was entered for two Formula One races that year, but he took no part in either of them. His entry was withdrawn from the non-championship 1951 Grand Prix d'Albi; a month later, he was due to race for Scuderia Ferrari at the 1951 Italian Grand Prix, but his car was unavailable and he withdrew before practice.

== 1953 Mille Miglia ==
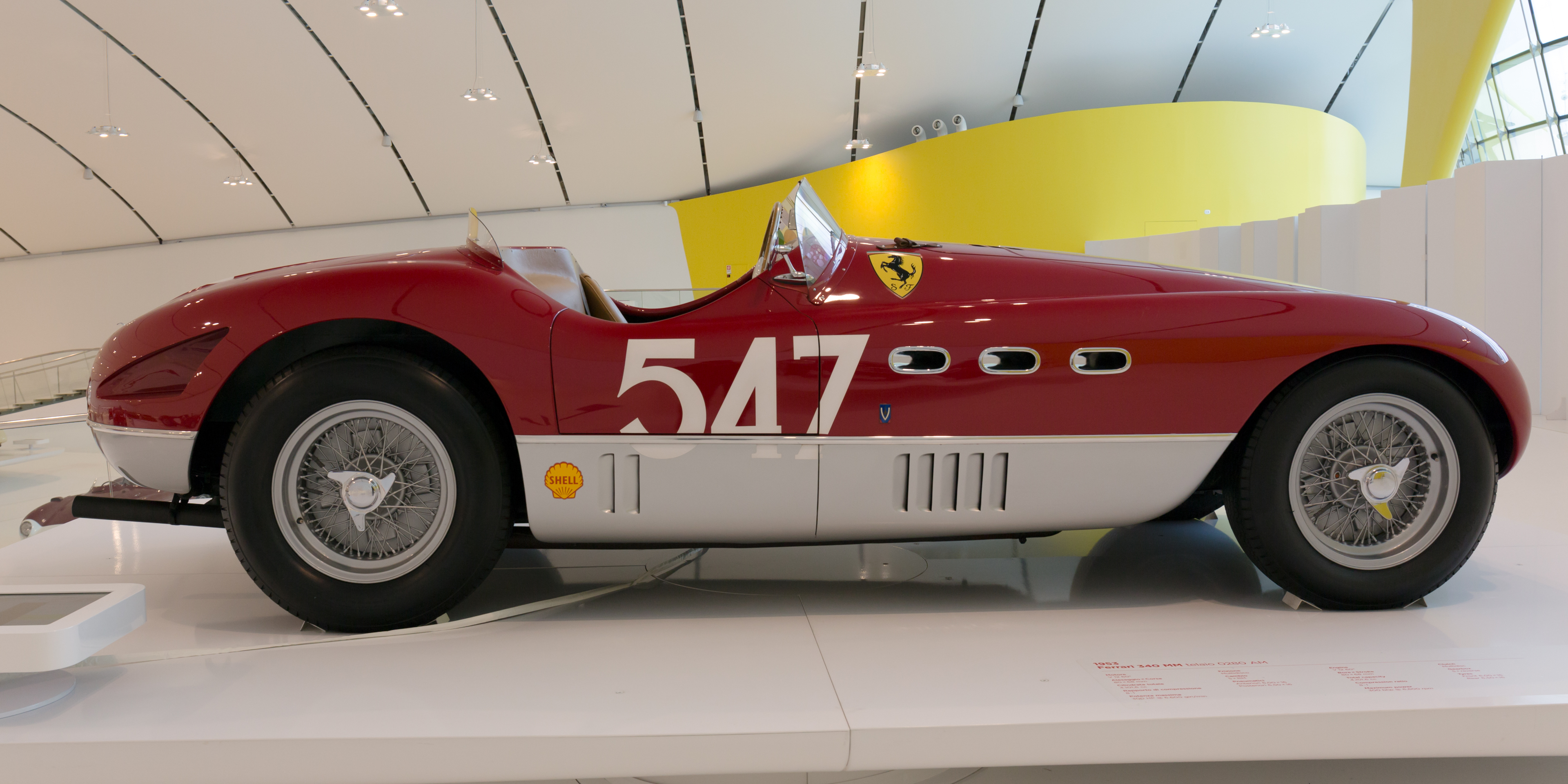
Ferrari 340 MM spider Vignale which won in the hands of Giannino Marzotto, pictured in the Enzo Ferrari Museum

Originally, Marzotto planned to race one of Alfa Romeo's new 6C 3000 CM, but upon returning from a business trip to Lebanon, he found that car had been assigned to another driver. After a call to Gianni Lancia found that the team was fully committed, Marzotto was forced to turn to Ferrari, with whom he had developed a strained relationship for a car. At Maranello, he was shown Luigi Villoresi's 340MM, which recently won the Giro di Sicilia. The car had not been touched since its last race and had suffered a loss of brakes towards the end of the event. He was left without any other option, so he took the car out of storage and restored it to racing trim. He was not delivered to Marzotto until a few hours before the race. This meant he was unable to do any pre-race testing in it.

Just past Siena, Marzotto remembered that the Ferrari mechanics did not change his engine oil at the last control point, as they were unable to open the bonnet. After making a U-turn, he raced back to Siena, where his mechanics cut a hole in the bonnet directly over the engine's oil filler cap and topped the oil up accordingly. Meanwhile, Juan Manuel Fangio's Alfa was now leading but surrendered to the chasing Marzotto when his steering started to play up along with fading brakes. Although Marzotto suffered two minor crashes, he took it to Brescia, to win his second Mille Miglia, repeating his success of 1950, again accompanied by Crosara.

The following year's event, would prove to be Marzotto last international race. He was partnered by Gioia Tortima instead of his regular co-driver Crosara in the full works Ferrari; however did not return to Brescia, as he withdrew during the event through illness.

"[He was] a man with a strong personality and fascinating dialectical skills for a young man as curious as I was, with numerous very clear ideas about a great number of topics." Enzo Ferrari, to whom the Marzotto brothers represented important customers, was particularly taken by Giannino. "He was a real sport merchant, a young Varzi in his cold, calculating earnestness. The successes in the Mille Miglias were a sure sign of his dedication and enough to show that he would have made an excellent professional driver, perhaps even a champion."

== Away from the track ==
After retiring from Motor Racing, Marzotto joined the Factory Lane G. Marzotto & F. Spa to become a director in 1953 before being promoted to managing director in 1956. In 1958, he gained a further promotion to vice-president and managing director before becoming the company president in 1968. He married in 1969 and had three daughters.

Marzotto was known to generously donate to the Fondazione Club Mille Miglia, encouraging its grants and giving of an international prize known as Courageous Intelligence.

== Achievements ==
Marzotto served as President of the Mille Miglia Club between 1988 and 1990, and then again from 2011 until his death. He was also the Honorary President of the Luigi Bonfanti Automobile Museum, which dedicated a permanent section to him in its Romano d'Ezzelino site. There is also a gallery known as Galleria del Motorismo, Mobilità ed Ingegno Veneto – Giannino Marzotto, and this explores the story of Marzotto's life of motor racing and shows his talent. It is entirely dedicated to his career.

== Marco Crosara ==
Crosara, Marzotto co-driver in those two Mille Miglia victories, died on 19 July 2012, just five days after his great friend.

== Racing record ==
=== Career highlights ===
Season	Series	Position	Team	Car
1950	Mille Miglia	1st	Scuderia Ferrari	Ferrari 195 S Berlinetta Touring
	3 H Roma	1st		Ferrari 195 S
	Coppa d'Oro delle Dolomiti	1st		Ferrari 166 MM
1951	Coppa della Toscana	1st	Scuderia Marzotto	Ferrari 212 Export
	Grand Prix de Rouen-les-Essarts	1st	Scuderia Marzotto	Ferrari 166F2/50
	Gran Premio di Roma	3rd	Scuderia Ferrari	Ferrari 166F2/50
1952	Coppa d'Oro delle Dolomiti	2nd	Scuderia Marzotto	Ferrari 340 America
1953	Mille Miglia	1st		Ferrari 340 MM Vignale Spyder

=== Complete 24 Hours of Le Mans results ===
Year	Team	Co-Drivers	Car	Class	Laps	Pos.	Class Pos.
1953	(Italy) Scuderia Ferrari	(Italy) Paolo Marzotto	Ferrari 340 MM Pininfarina Berlinetta	S5.0	294	5th	4th

=== Complete Mille Miglia results ===
Year	Team	Co-Drivers/Navigator	Car	Class	Pos.	Class Pos.
1948		(Italy) Umberto Marzotto	Lancia Aprilia	T+1.1	28th	9th
1949		(Italy) Marco Crosara	Lancia Aprilia	T+1.1	DNF	
1950	(Italy) Scuderia Ferrari	(Italy) Marco Crosara	Ferrari 195 S Berlinette Touring	S+2.0	1st	1st
1951	(Italy) Scuderia Marzotto	(Italy) Marco Crosara	Ferrari 212 Export	S5.0	DNF (Tyre)	
1953		(Italy) Marco Crosara	Ferrari 340 MM Vignale Spyder	S+2.0	1st	1st
1954	(Italy) Scuderia Ferrari	(Italy) Gioia Tortima	Ferrari 375 Plus	S+2.0	DNF (Driver illness)	

Sporting positions
Preceded by Clemente Biondetti; Ettore Salani	Mille Miglia; 1950	Succeeded by Luigi Villoresi; Pasquale Cassani
Preceded by Giovanni Bracco; Alfonso Rolfo	Mille Miglia; 1953	Succeeded by Alberto Ascari
