= Vittorio Marzotto =

Italian racing driver

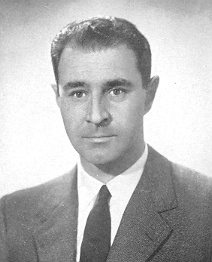

Vittorio Marzotto (13 June 1922, Valdagno – 4 February 1999) was an Italian racing driver.

Born in Valdagno, near Vicenza, Vittorio was the son of Gaetano Marzotto, the founder of the Marzotto textile manufacturer company. He was the oldest of four brothers (Paolo, Giannino, Umberto and Vittorio), who were all racing drivers too.

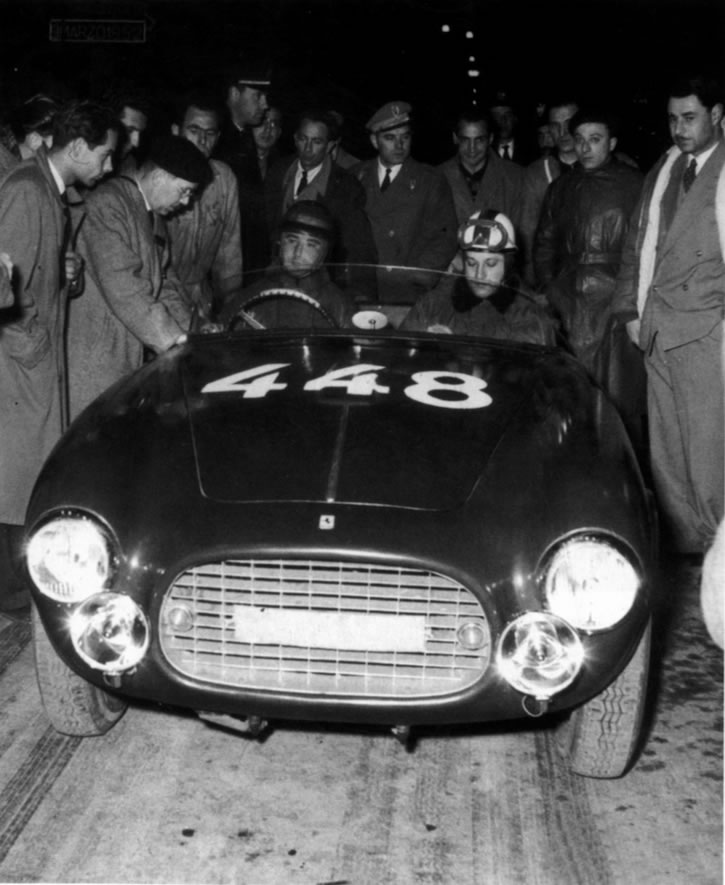
Vittorio at left (with the steering wheel), at Giro di Sicilia in 1952 with Otello Marchotto.

Marzotto made his debut in motor racing in the late 1940s after the end of World War II. He entered 16 sports car races between 1948 and 1955, mainly driving Ferrari's cars. His best results were two victories (the 1951 Giro di Sicilia and the 1952 Monaco Grand Prix) and three second places.

Marzotto also entered a Formula 1-race in 1952, the French Grand Prix, as reserve driver for Scuderia Ferrari. However, all Ferrari works drivers started the race, so Marzotto was unable to start. He never competed in Formula 1 again and retired from professional racing at the end of the 1950s.

== Complete results ==
Year	Date	Race	Entrant	Car	Teammate(s)	Result
1948	May 2	Mille Miglia	-	Lancia Aprilia	Paolo Marzotto	DNF
1950	April 2	Targa Florio	-	Ferrari 166 MM	Sergio Sighinolfi	DNF
1950	April 23	Mille Miglia	Scuderia Ferrari	Ferrari 195 S	Paolo Fontana	9th
1950	April 30	Coppa d'Oro di Sicilia	-	Ferrari 340 America	-	-
1951	April 1	Giro di Sicilia	Scuderia Marzotto	Ferrari 212 Export	Paolo Fontana	1st
1951	April 29	Mille Miglia	Scuderia Marzotto	Ferrari 340 America	Otello Marchetto	DNF
1951	June 3	Coppa della Toscana	Scuderia Marzotto	Ferrari 340 America	Zanuso	2nd
1951	June 17	Circuito do Porto	Scuderia Marzotto	Ferrari 212 Export	none	2nd
1951	July 15	Coppa d' Oro delle Dolomiti	Scuderia Marzotto	Ferrari 340 America	none	DNF
1952	March 9	Giro di Sicilia	-	Ferrari 225 S	-	DNF
1952	March 16	Syracuse Grand Prix	Scuderia Marzotto	Ferrari 166 C	Piero Carini; Sergio Sighinolfi	DNF
1952	May 4	Mille Miglia	Scuderia Marzotto	Ferrari 225 S	Otello Marchetto	DNF
1952	June 2	1952 Monaco Grand Prix	Scuderia Marzotto	Ferrari 225 S	none	1st
1952	June 29	Targa Florio	-	Ferrari 225 S	-	DNS
1952	July 6	1952 French Grand Prix	Scuderia Ferrari	-	Alberto Ascari; Nino Farina; Piero Taruffi; Louis Rosier; Rudi Fischer; Peter Hirt; Franco Comotti; Piero Carini	DNS
1952	July 13	Coppa d' Oro delle Dolomiti	-	Ferrari 225 S	-	5th
1953	April 12	Giro di Sicilia	Scuderia Lancia	Lancia Aurelia	none	-
1954	May 2	Mille Miglia	Scuderia Ferrari	Ferrari 500 Mondial	none	2nd
1955	April 3	Giro di Sicilia	Vittorio Marzotto	Maserati 300S	none	6th
