= Coppa della Toscana =

Former sports car race in Italy

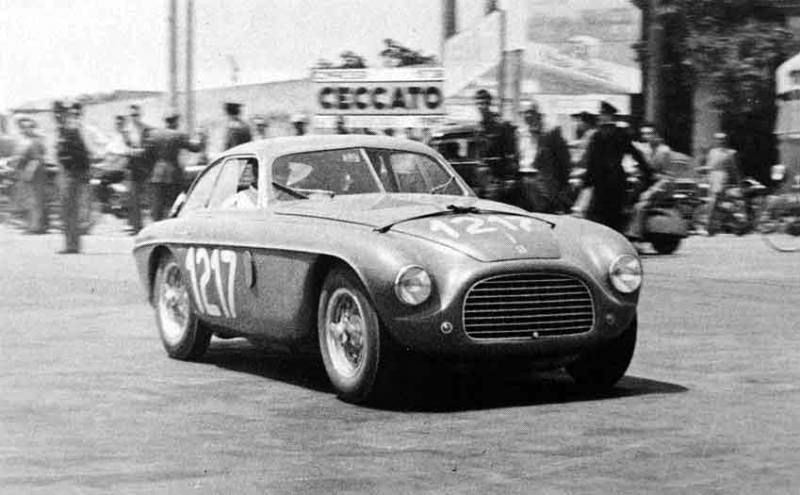
Cornacchia and Del Carlo in a Ferrari 195 S during the 1950 event

Coppa della Toscana (meaning Tuscany Cup in Italian) was a sports car race held on the roads of Tuscany, through Livorno and Florence, between 1949 and 1954.

== History ==
For the 1949 season of the Mille Miglia race, it was decided that this years edition would bypass the city of Florence. As a direct consequence of this decision, the Automobile Club of Florence decided to organize an alternative race that would run in Tuscany. The new event would enable sports cars and touring cars to compete through the streets of the Tuscan cities and on the roads around the region.

The main organizer of this race was the director of the Florence Automobile Club, Amos Pampaloni who also negotiated with a neighboring automobile clubs to receive their support. In the end the event crossed ten Tuscan provinces: Arezzo, Florence, Grosseto, Livorno, Lucca, Massa, Pisa, Pistoia, Siena and Viterbo.

The race ran from 1949 to 1954 as a non-championship race, circling around the Tuscany region. The first two editions ran on a circuit with a starting point and finish in Livorno, and from 1951 the start and finish was moved to Florence. The distance and course of each race changed with almost every edition, but was much shorter than the Mille Miglia. Contestants had to finish a single lap of the race.

For each race numerous categories were prepared, covering sport, grand touring and touring cars, later expanded by series-produced sports car classes. Each category was further subdivided into engine capacity classes, even as small as 350 cc.

=== 1949 ===
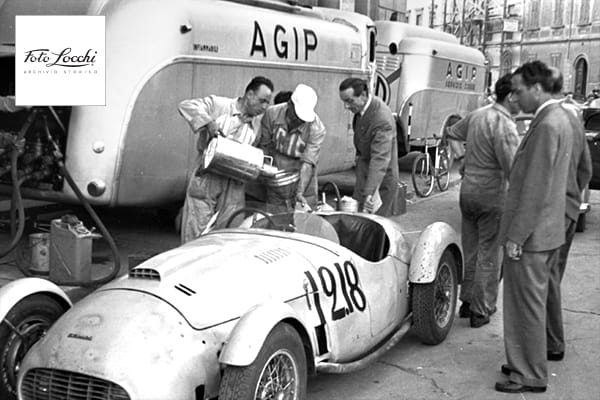
Fiat-Ermini 1100 Siluro

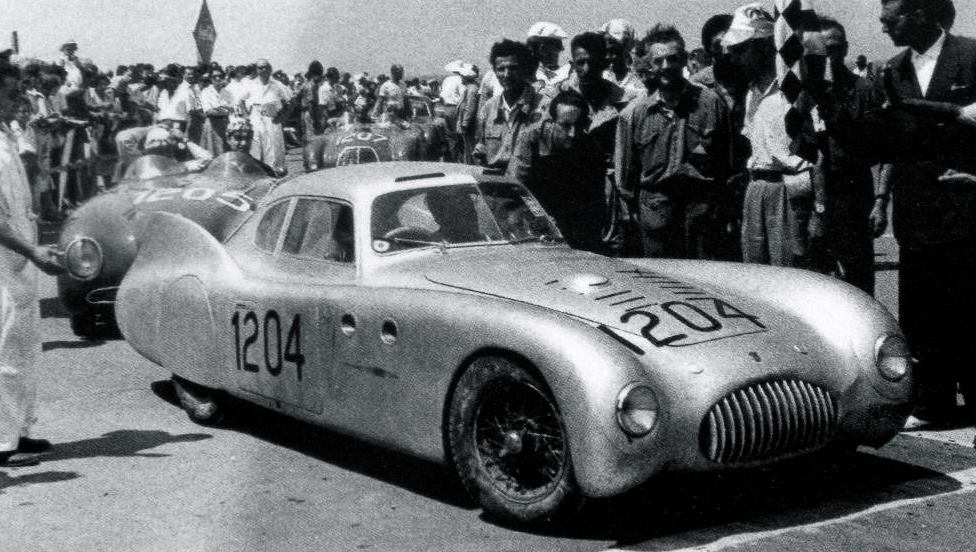
Cisitalia 202 CMM driven by Misorini and Serena

The first edition, I. Coppa della Toscana, was held in July 1949. The start of the race around Tuscany was at Livorno. The course had a total distance of 604 km. Out of 80 teams that entered in the race, only 44 had managed to finish back in Livorno.

The overall winner of the race was Ugo Bormioli in the Ermini 1100 Siluro, that managed an average speed of 113.8 km/h. He competed in a smaller 'Sport 1.1' class. The Lancia Aprilia and Alfa Romeo 6C, on second and third places respectively, were from a bigger 'Sport +1.1' category.

Giovanni Lurani, aided by Cortese won the 'T+1.5' class in a Bristol. Danzi and Bracco in the Lancia Aprilia won the 'T1.5' category. Leonardi/Rosati team in a rare Fiat-Patriarca were first in the 'Sport 750' class.

Top results of the 1949 Coppa della Toscana:

Pos.	Class Pos.	Class	No.	Drivers	Car
1st	1st	S1.1	1210	(Italy) Ugo Bormioli (Italy) Caffini	Fiat-Ermini 1100 Siluro
2nd	1st	S+1.1		(Italy) Sonio Coletti	Lancia Aprilia
3rd	2nd	S+1.1		(Italy) Aldo Benedetti (Italy) Renzo Battaglini	Alfa Romeo 6C 2500
4th	2nd	S1.1		(Italy) Elio Checcacci (Italy) M. Checcacci	Stanguellini S1100
5th	3rd	S1.1		(Italy) Ovidio Capelli (Italy) Mario Brambilla	Stanguellini S1100

=== 1950 ===
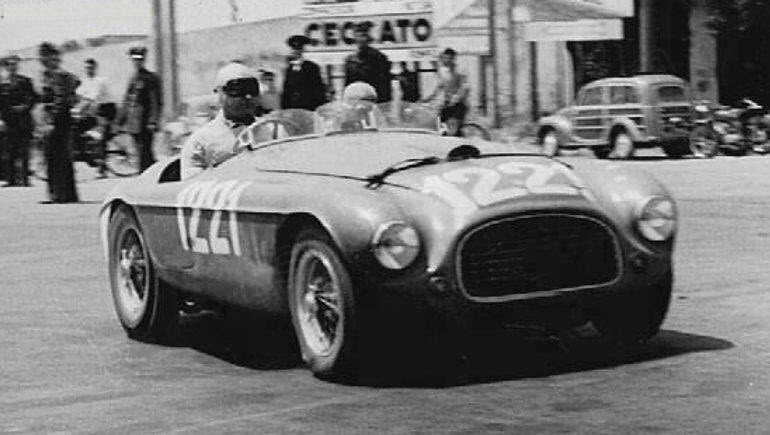
Winning Ferrari 195 S Touring Barchetta

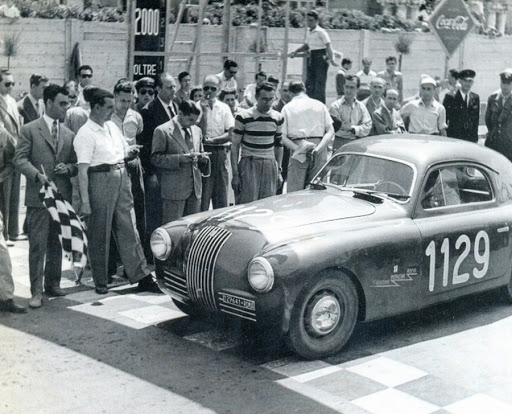
Carotti and Ercolani in Fiat 1100 S berlinetta at Coppa Toscana

The second edition, II. Coppa della Toscana, followed a longer circuit route that was 680 km long, with, the start and finish was still in Livorno. Popularity of the race grew and now 152 teams had entered.

Two Ferrari 195 S' scored first two places, the very same cars that placed first and second at the Mille Miglia, earlier that year, but in a reverse order. The winning barchetta's average speed was 127.7 km/h. Third was Ermini only three seconds behind but securing a victory in class. Its Fiat-based engine was half the size of the Ferrari 195.

Schwelm Cruz with Datisi in the Alfa Romeo 6C won the GT class. "Ippocampo" (Umberto Castiglioni) and Mori in the Lancia Aprilia won the 'T+1.1' category.

Top results of the 1950 Coppa della Toscana:

Pos.	Class Pos.	Class	No.	Drivers	Car
1st	1st	S+2.0	1221	(Italy) Dorino Serafini (Italy) Ettore Salani	Ferrari 195 S barchetta
2nd	2nd	S+2.0	1217	(Italy) Franco Cornacchia (Italy) Del Carlo	Ferrari 195 S berlinetta
3rd	1st	S1.1		(Italy) Piero Scotti (Italy) Giulio Cantini	Fiat-Ermini 1100

=== 1951 ===
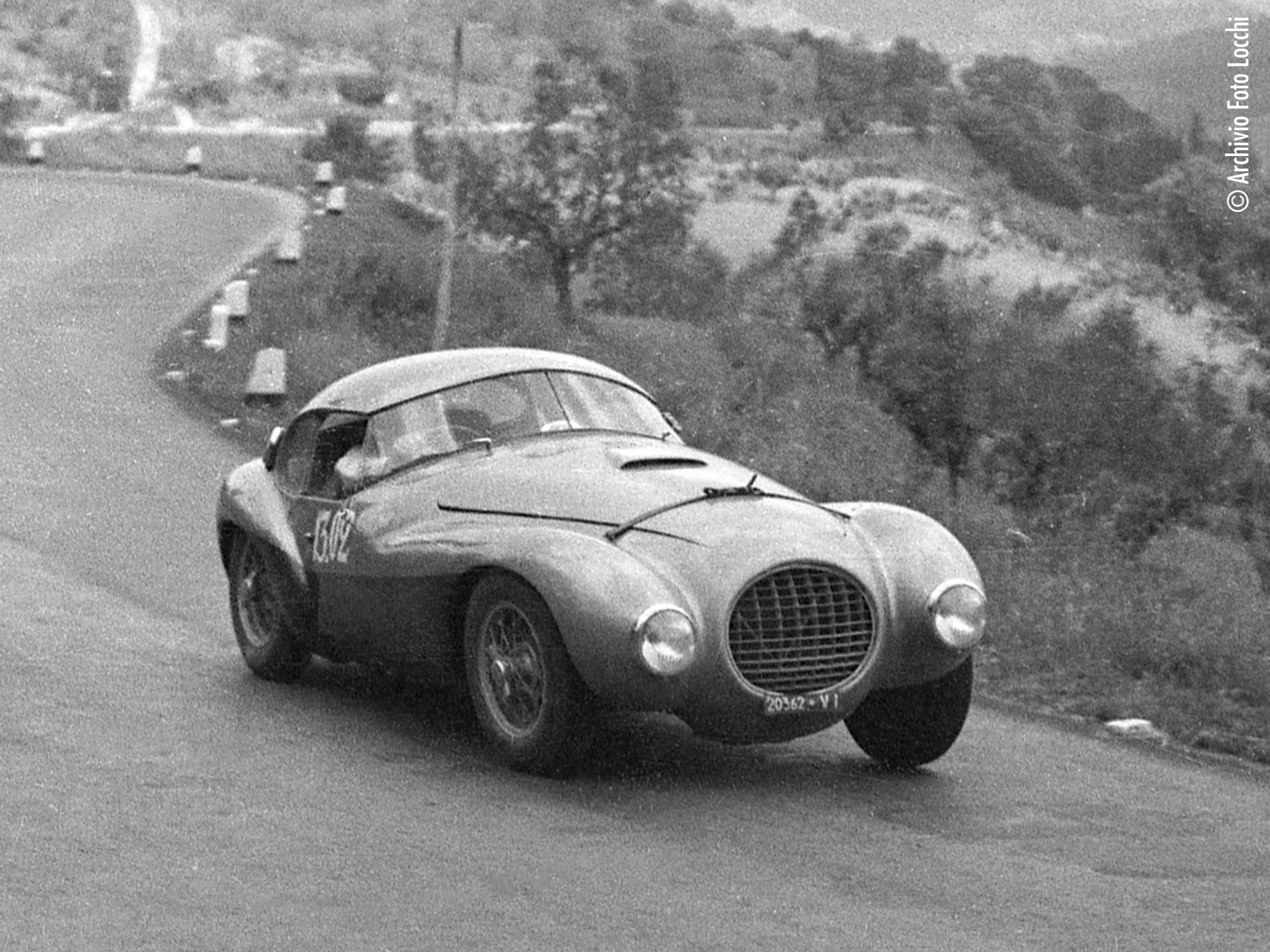
Winning Ferrari 212 Export Fontana Berlinetta l'Uovo

III. Coppa della Toscana used the same circuit length but the start/finish line was moved to Florence. Even more cars competed this year: 186 and 97 of those were classified at the finish line.

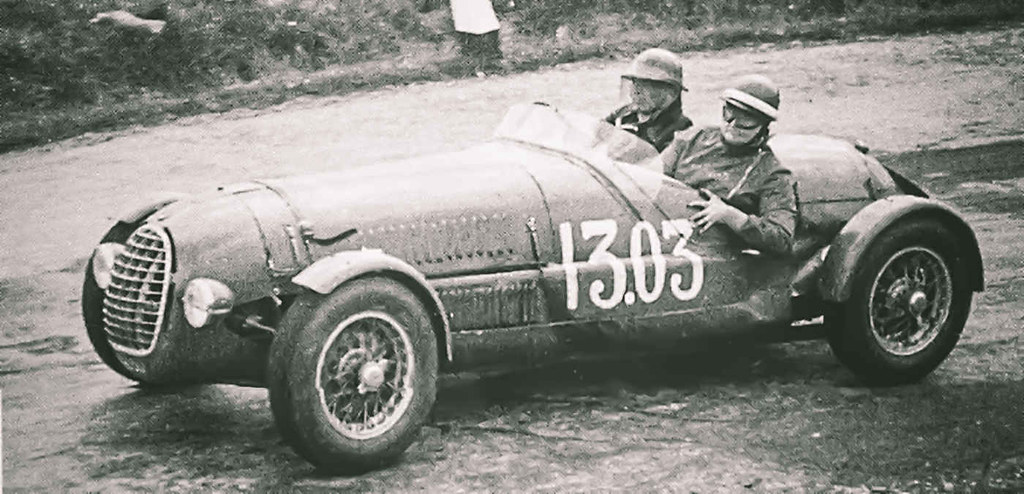
Biondetti Ferrari-Jaguar Special driven to a 4th place and class victory

The winning Ferrari 212 Export Fontana Berlinetta l'Uovo was entered by Scuderia Marzotto. The car was converted form a crashed 166 MM barchetta and rebodied in a one-off coachwork by Carrozzeria Fontana. The winner's average speed was 129.7 km/h.

Cornacchia and Del Carlo in the Ferrari 212 MM, entered by Scuderia Guastella won the GT class.

Top results of the 1951 Coppa della Toscana:

Pos.	Class Pos.	Class	No.	Drivers	Car
1st	1st	S2.0	1302	(Italy) Giannino Marzotto (Italy) Marco Crosara	Ferrari 212 Export berlinetta
2nd	1st	S+2.0	1258	(Italy) Vittorio Marzotto (Italy) Vittorio Zanuso	Ferrari 340 America barchetta
3rd	2nd	S2.0		(Italy) Piero Scotti	Ferrari 212 Export spyder
4th	1st	GT+2.0	1303	(Italy) Clemente Biondetti (Italy) G. Vinci	Biondetti Ferrari-Jaguar Special
5th	1st	S1.1	1224	(Italy) Giulio Cabianca (Italy) Luigi Zanelli	Osca MT4 1100

=== 1952 ===
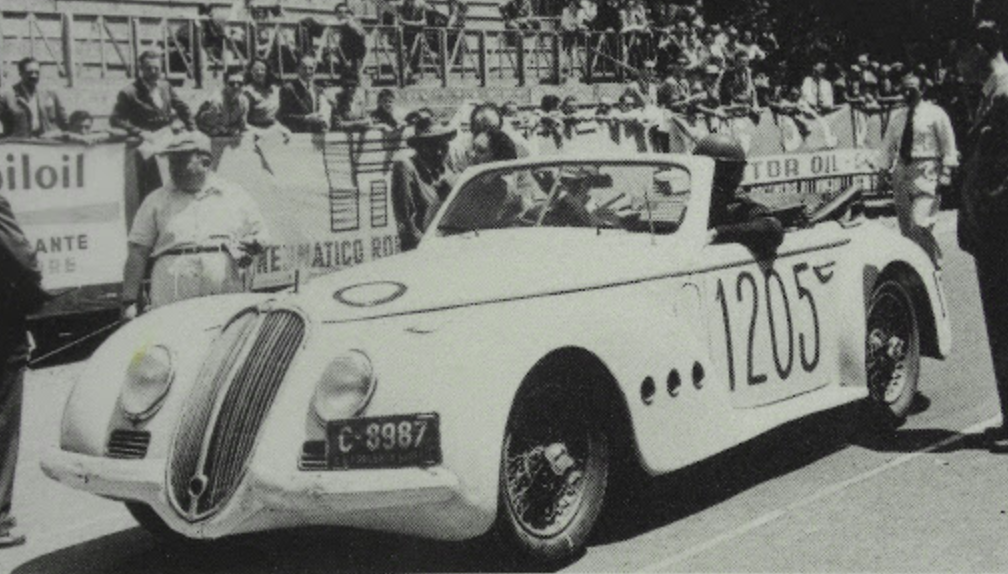
The "Rosa Bianca" Alfa Romeo 6C 2500 of US Lieutenant Henry Bartecchi

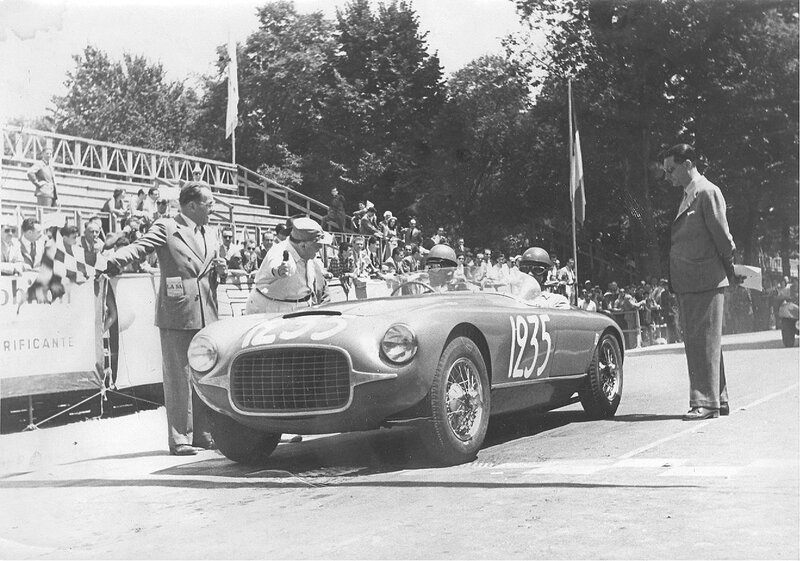
Renato Nocentini in the Motto-bodied 1947 Ferrari 159 C s/n 002C

Quarta Coppa della Toscana, the fourth edition of the race was held in June 1952. Race distance was lengthened to 739 km. The winning Ferrari's average speed was 121.9 km/h.

Scotti and Pieratelli driving the Lancia Aurelia won the 'GT2.0' class. Felice Bonetto aided by Giampaolo Volpini, also in the Lancia Aurelia, but a B21 berlina, won the 'T+1.5' category. Emilio Giletti with Walter Loro Piana in the Ferrari 166 MM Touring Barchetta were first in the 'S2.0' class.

Top results of the 1952 Coppa della Toscana:

Pos.	Class Pos.	Class	No.	Drivers	Car
1st	1st	S+2.0	1249	(Italy) Bruno Sterzi (Italy) Arnoldo Roselli	Ferrari 225 S berlinetta
2nd	1st	S1.1	1230	(Italy) Roberto Sgorbati (Italy) Luigi Zanelli	Osca MT4 1100
3rd	2nd	S1.1	1210	(Italy) Bruno Venezian (Italy) Achille Albarelli	Osca MT4 1100
4th	1st	GT+2.0		(Italy) Franco Cornacchia (Italy) Ruffini	Ferrari 212 MM berlinetta
5th	3rd	S1.1	1213	(Italy) Diego Capelli (Italy) Giuseppe Veronelli	Osca MT4 1100

=== 1953 ===
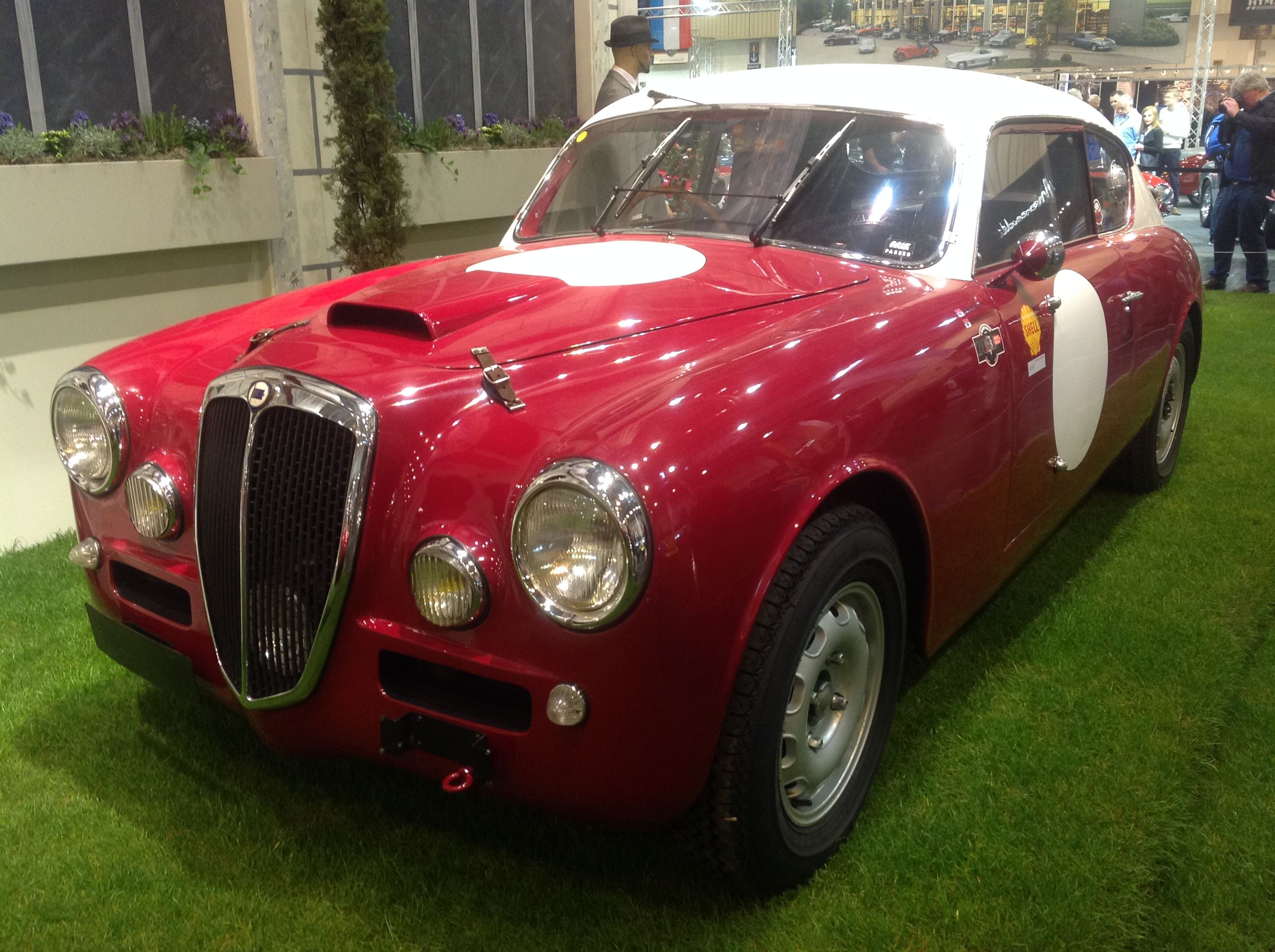
Lancia Aurelia B20 GT

V. Coppa della Toscana was held in May 1953. Circuit and race distance was shortened to 633 km. In total 200 teams had started the event, 109 of those had classified at the finish line.

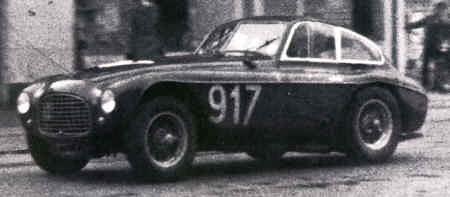
Ferrari 166 MM rebodied by Zagato as berlinetta

Scuderia Lancia dominated the event and podium with all three first places filled by their Aurelia GT 2500. The winning team of Clemente Biondetti and Gino Bronzoni achieved an average speed of 117.6 km/h.

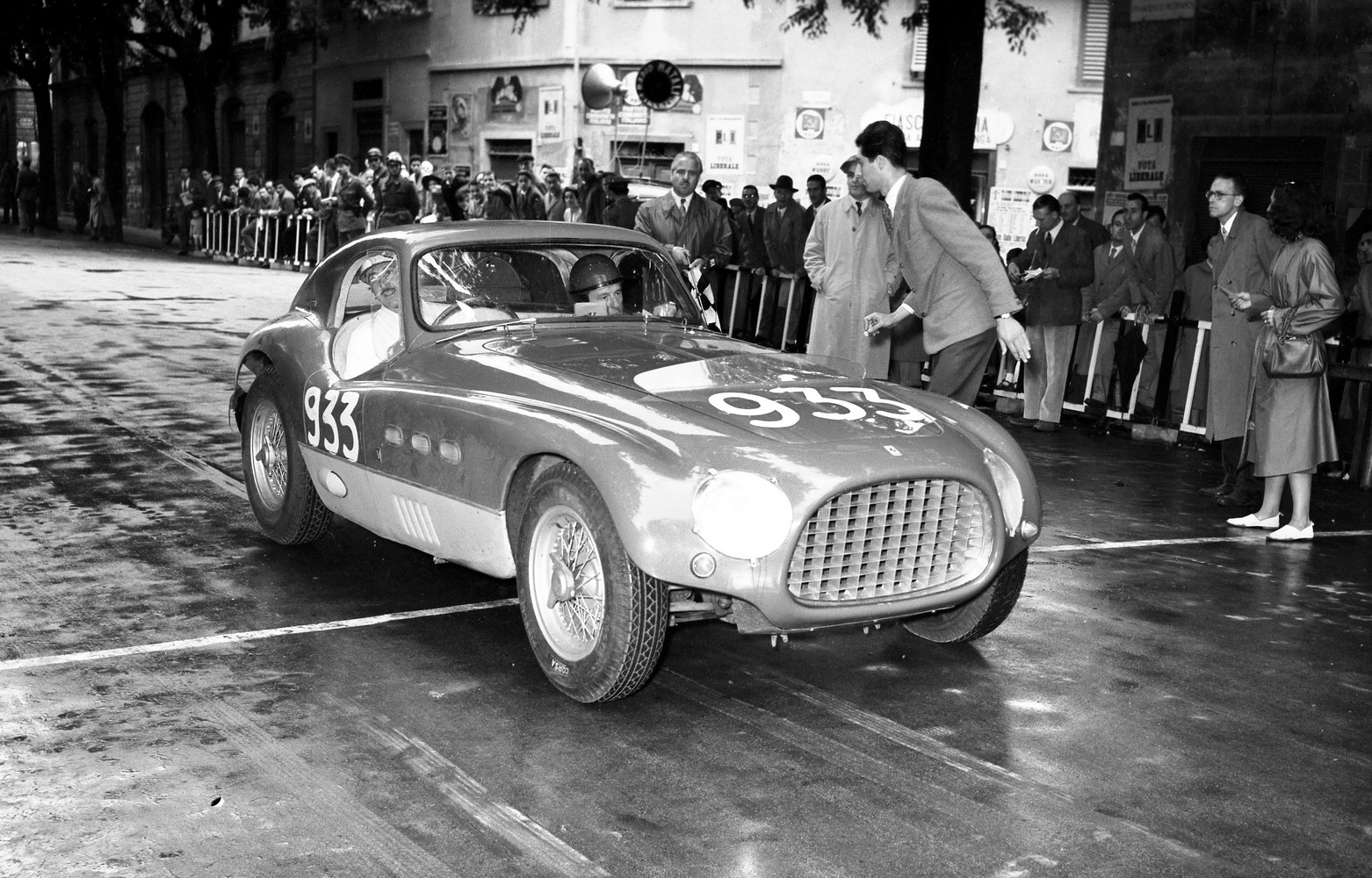
Ferrari 340 MM Vignale Spyder with hardtop driven by Bruno Sterzi and Giulio Rovelli to a 6th place overall

Roberto Sgorbati and Luigi Zanelli, driving the OSCA MT4 1100 won the 'S1.1' class. Luigi Bellucci with Colucci in the Alfa Romeo 1900 won the 'GT2.0' category. Sergio Mantovani and his Maserati A6GCS/53 Fantuzzi Spyder were the 'S2.0' class victors. Carlo Chiti entered the Benedetti Giannini 750 Sport but did not finish the race. Best Ferrari result was tenth overall with Scotti and Cantini. Siro Sbraci driving the Ferrari 212 Inter scored a victory in the 'serS+2.0' category.

Top results of the 1953 Coppa della Toscana:

Pos.	Class Pos.	Class	No.	Drivers	Car
1st	1st	GT+2.0		(Italy) Clemente Biondetti (Italy) Gino Bronzoni	Lancia Aurelia GT 2500
2nd	2nd	GT+2.0		(Italy) Gino Valenzano (Italy) Luigi Maggio	Lancia Aurelia GT 2500
3rd	3rd	GT+2.0		(Italy) Roberto Piodi (Italy) Bruno Veglia	Lancia Aurelia GT 2500
4th	1st	S+2.0		(Italy) Franco Bordoni (Italy) Luigi Daffano	Gordini T15S 2.3
5th	1st	T+1.5		(Italy) Piero Carini (Italy) A. Artesani	Alfa Romeo 1900 TI
6th	2nd	S+2.0	933	(Italy) Bruno Sterzi (Italy) Giulio Rovelli	Ferrari 340 MM Vignale Spyder
7th	1st	S1.1	218	(Italy) Roberto Sgorbati (Italy) Luigi Zanelli	OSCA MT4 1100
8th	1st	GT2.0		(Italy) Luigi Bellucci (Italy) Alfredo Colucci	Alfa Romeo 1900

=== 1954 ===
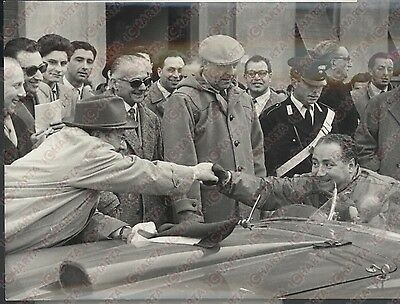
Piero Scotti after winning Coppa della Toscana with Ferrari 375 MM Pinin Farina Spyder

VI. Coppa della Toscana, was the last edition of the Tuscan Cup. It ran on the longest 760 km circuit around the Tuscany. The popularity started to diminish compared to the previous year as only 132 cars were entered. After the race 75 teams were classified.

Race was won by Piero Scotti in a 4.5-litre Ferrari 375 MM Pinin Farina Spyder at an average speed of 126.3 km/h. The second-place 3.0-litre Gordini arrived at the finish line almost twelve minutes later.

Francesco Giardini and Cestelli, driving the Osca MT4 1100 won the 'S1.1' class. Piero Carini with A. Artesani in the Alfa Romeo 1900 TI were first in the 'TS' category. Franco Ribaldi aided by Basili, driving the Lancia Aurelia GT won the 'GT+2.0' class. The smallest engine capacity class, 'S350', was won by the Romiti brothers in the Iso Isetta.

Top results of the 1954 Coppa della Toscana:

Pos.	Class Pos.	Class	No.	Drivers	Car
1st	1st	S+2.0	937	(Italy) Piero Scotti	Ferrari 375 MM spyder
2nd	2nd	S+2.0		(Italy) Franco Bordoni (Italy) A. Da Fano	Gordini T24S 3.0
3rd	1st	serS+750		(Italy) Camillo Luglio (Italy) Elfo Frignani	Ferrari 250 MM berlinetta
4th	3rd	S+2.0		(Italy) Roberto Piodi	Lancia Aurelia GT 2500
5th	2nd	serS+750		(Italy) Sergio Ferraguti	Maserati A6GCS/53 spyder

=== Cancellation ===
The race ran for six consecutive editions between 1949 and 1954. In 1955 the ten Tuscan automobile clubs failed to come to an agreement over the next years edition. The Automobile Club of Florence was left without support and the Coppa della Toscana was cancelled. The Club decided to organize an alternative Tuscan race on the Mugello Road Circuit, that would later be known as the Grand Prix of Mugello.

== Revival ==
In 1996, the members of the Tuscan Vintage Motor Car Club revived the long-closed event. The recreated race became a tourist event called the Tuscan Cup and is recognized by the ASI organisation. Since 2002 the re-enactment of the historical race combined the organizational support of all the Tuscan Automobile Clubs.
