= Ferrari 195 S =

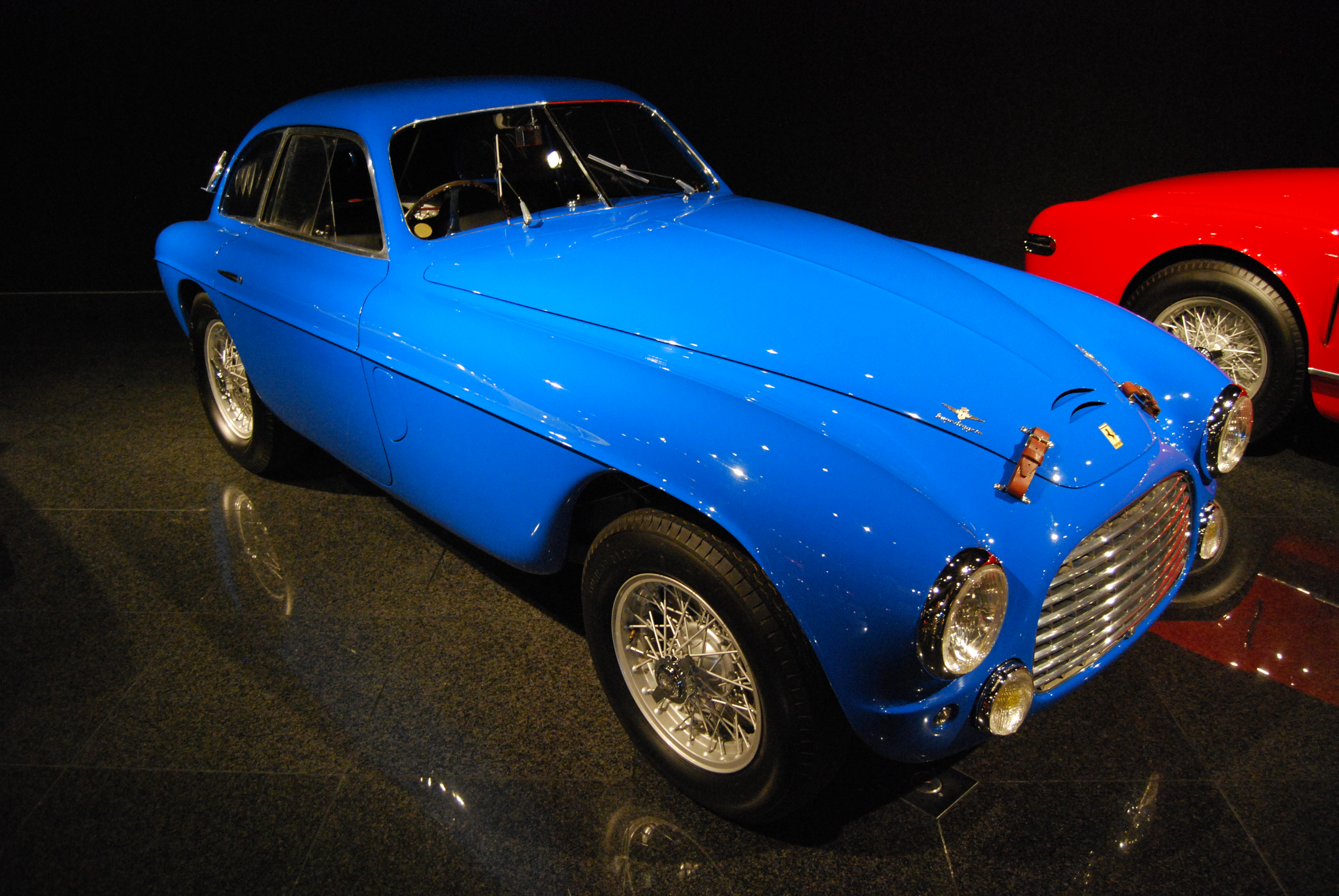
- Ferrari 195 S Touring Berlinetta

Overview
- Manufacturer: Ferrari
- Also called: Ferrari 195 Sport
- Production: 1950; 4 converted from 166 MM
- Designer: Federico Formenti at Carrozzeria Touring

Body and chassis
- Class: Sports car
- Body style: Berlinetta; Barchetta
- Layout: Front mid-engine, rear-wheel-drive
- Related: Ferrari 166 MM

Powertrain
- Engine: 2.3 L (2341.02 cc) Colombo V12
- Power output: 170 PS
- Transmission: 5-speed manual

Dimensions
- Wheelbase: 2,250 mm (89 in)
- Curb weight: 720 kg (1,587 lb) (dry, barchetta); 780 kg (1,720 lb) (berlinetta)

Chronology
- Predecessor: Ferrari 166 MM
- Successor: Ferrari 212 Export

See also the 195 Inter grand tourer
See also the 166 MM Berlinetta Le Mans

The Ferrari 195 S was a sports racing car produced by Ferrari in 1950, as an improved version of the 166 MM. The 195 S won Mille Miglia, Coppa della Toscana and Giro delle Calabria.

== Development ==
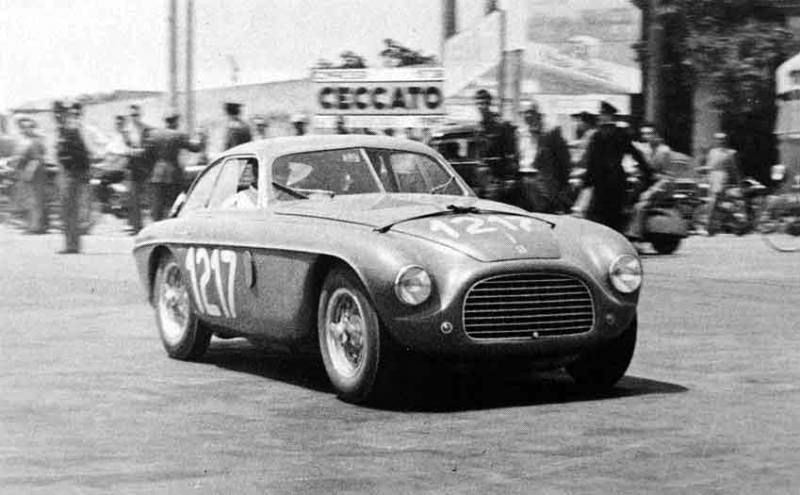
Cornaccia and Del Carlo in 195 S finishing second at 1950 Coppa della Toscana

The Ferrari 195 S was a further development of the Colombo V12 engine from the 166 MM race car up to a displacement of 2.3-litres. There was a significant increase in power and its delivery. Only four examples were converted from 166 MM range. Two were closed berlinettas s/n 0026M and 0060M, and two open barchettas s/n 0022M and 0038M, all bodied by Carrozzeria Touring. The berlinettas were 166 MM Berlinetta Le Mans race cars before the conversion.

Only Ferraris converted from the 166 MM range were counted as 195 S. Those converted from the 166 Inter range are redesignated as 195 Inters. Briefly there was one example of a 195 Sport converted from a 166 Ansaloni Spyder Corsa s/n 012I. In 1949 it was rebodied by Paolo Fontana's Carrozzeria Fontana as a homage to the Touring Barchetta style and in 1950 converted to 195-specification. After a few races and hillclimbs it was further converted with a 2.5-litre engine.

The 1950 Ferrari 166 MM/195 S Berlinetta Le Mans s/n 0060M was estimated at between US$6.5 – 7.5 million by Gooding & Company for their Pebble Beach 2018 auction.

== Specifications ==
The Colombo V12 engine received a 5 mm wider bore than its predecessor. Now the internal measurements were 65 by 58.8 mm (2.6 by 2.3 in) of bore and stroke. The resulting total displacement was increased from 2.0 L to 2.3 L; 142.9 cu in (2,341.02 cc). At 8.5:1 compression ratio the maximum power rose to 170 PS (125 kW; 168 hp) at 7000 rpm. The fuel feed was improved with bigger, triple Weber 36DCF carburettors. The engine had a single overhead camshaft per cylinder bank, actuating two valves per cylinder and a single spark plug ignition system. Wet sump lubrication was used.

The 195 S used a 166 MM-sourced tubular steel chassis with wider track and slightly longer wheelbase, measuring 2,250 mm (88.6 in). The front and rear suspension setup remained exactly the same as before. Brakes were hydraulic drums all-round and the transmission was a five-speed, non-synchronised type.

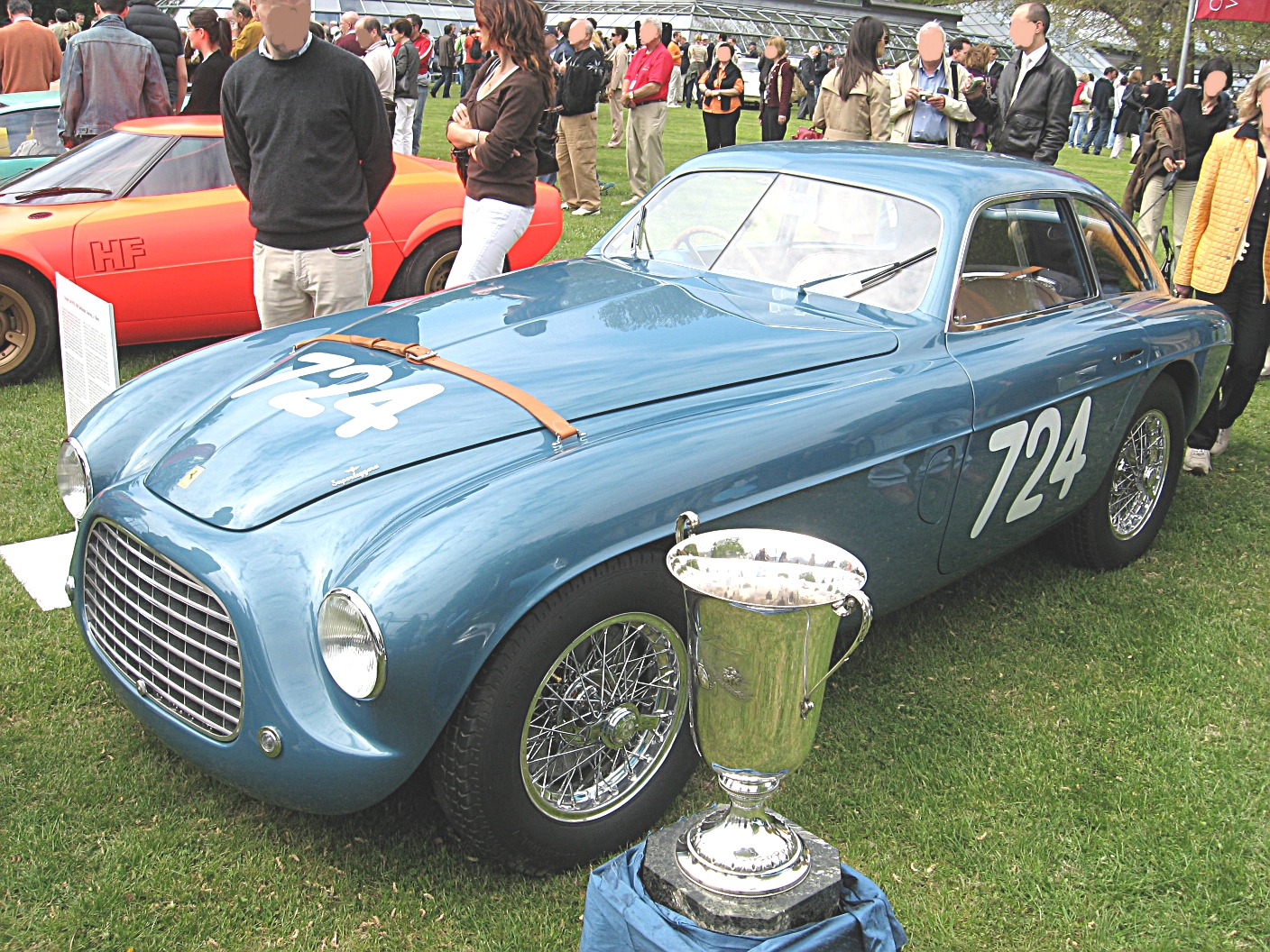
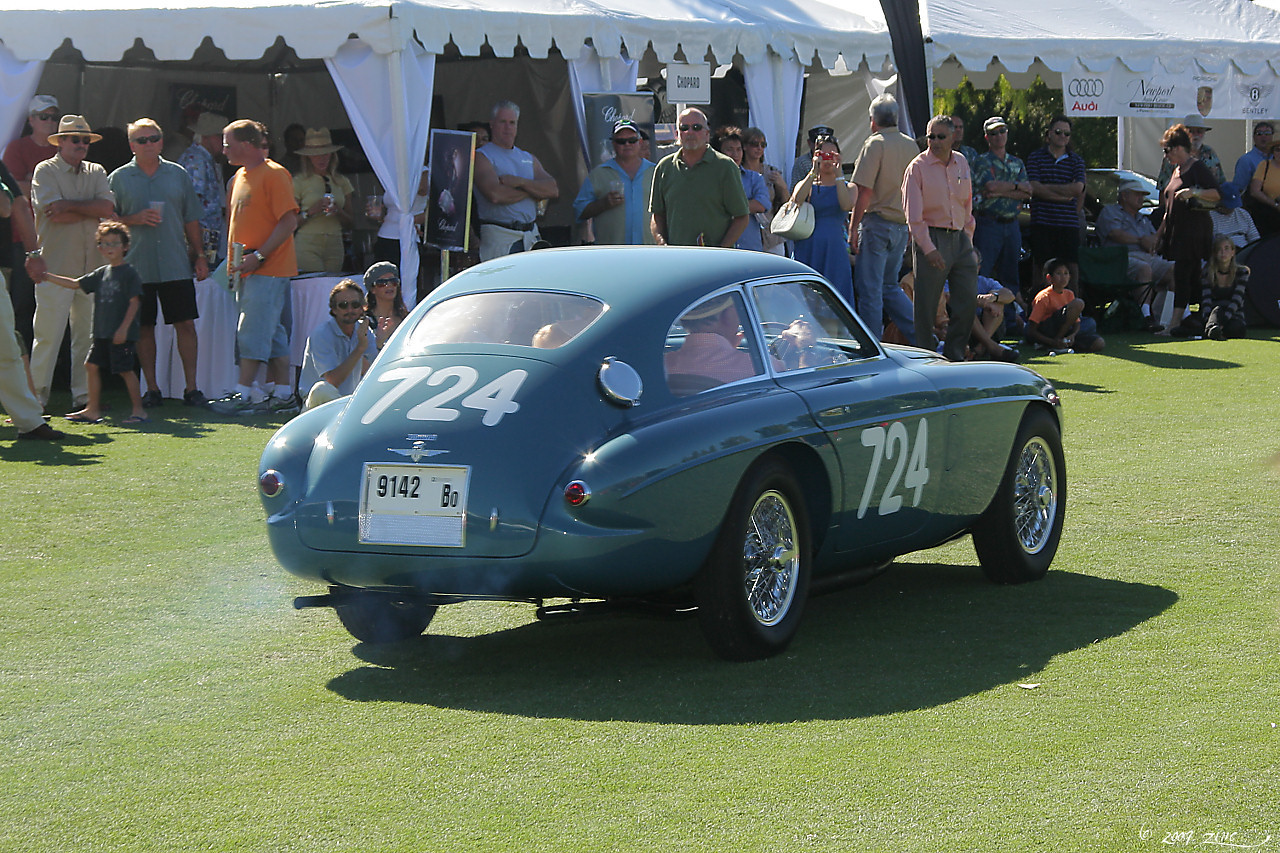
Ferrari 195 S Touring Berlinetta

== Racing ==
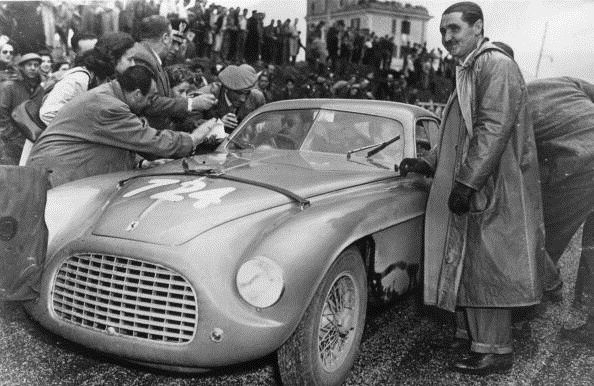
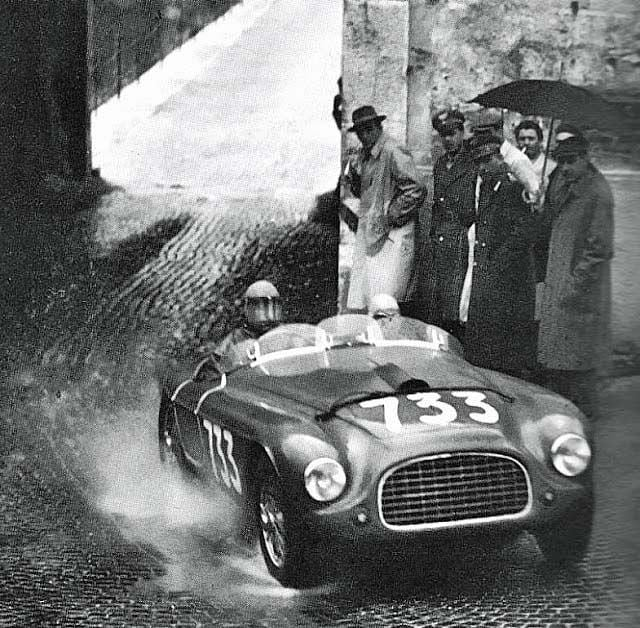
First (top) and second (bottom) place at 1950 Mille Miglia

The Ferrari 195 S had its first outing at the 1950 Targa Florio and Giro di Sicilia as they were the same event that year. Two factory cas were entered, accompanied by a third 195 Sport converted from a Spyder Corsa with an open barchetta bodywork by Carrozzeria Fontana. None of the cars finished the race. One retired with an oil problem and the others stopped to rescue Fabrizio Serena, a crashed Lancia Aprilia driver.

The first success came at the 1950 Mille Miglia, where Giannino Marzotto and Marco Crosara drove their berlinetta to a victory. In spite of a bad weather, Marzotto was reported to be wearing a double breasted suit and tie. The winners average speed was 123.5 km/h. Giannino was the youngest Mille Miglia winner to date at only 22. The second place also went to the 195 S but in a barchetta form, driven by Dorino Serafini and Ettore Salani. Vittorio Marzotto and Paolo Fontana drove a Fontana Barchetta to a ninth place overall and sixth in S+2.0 class. All three cars were entered by Scuderia Ferrari. Later the same year, three 195s finished Coppa della Toscana race around Tuscany. This time around Serafini and Salani won in a barchetta at an average speed of 127.7 km/h. Franco Cornacchia with Del Carlo were second, driving the same berlinetta that was victorious at Mille Miglia. Another barchetta finished seventh overall, driven by Elio Checcacci aided by Dal Preda. Giannino Marzotto also won the 3 Hours of Rome race also known as Notturne della Caracalla.

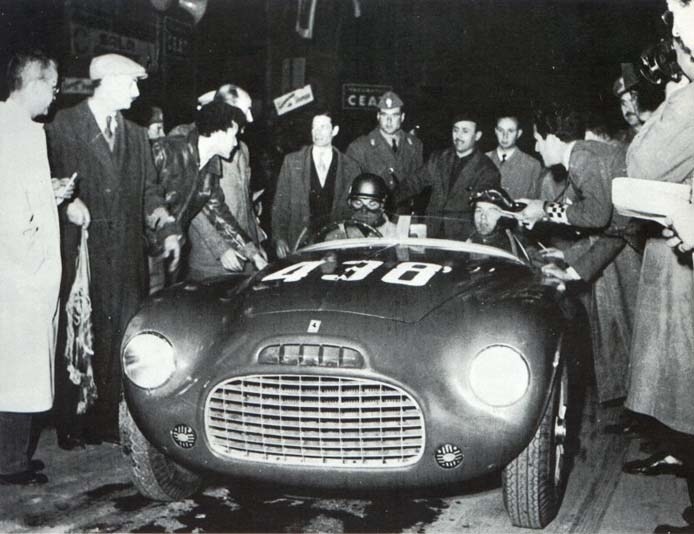
Taruffi and Salani in 195 S finishing second at 1951 Giro di Sicilia

For the 1950 24 Hours of Le Mans, two 195 S' were entered by Luigi Chinetti. One driven by Raymond Sommer and Dorino Serafini achieved a fastest lap in practice at 161.90 km/h by Sommer. The other car was driven by Chinetti and Pierre-Louis "Heldé" Dreyfus. Both cars retired from the race. Sommer's car after 12 hours and 82 laps with electrical problems. Chinetti's car retired during 121'st lap with a broken gearbox. Later the same year, Franco Cornacchia scored a third place at the Coppa d'Oro delle Dolomiti.

At the 1950 Giro delle Calabria, two Ferraris 195 S scored first two places on the podium. Dorino Serafini and Ettore Salani in a Barchetta were first on the finish line ahead of Cornacchia and Del Carlo in their berlinetta. One of the Le Mans cars were acquired by Briggs Cunningham with an intention to compete in the United States. Luigi Chinetti and Alfred Momo drove the 195 S at the first edition of the 6 Hours of Sebring race, established as a Sam Collier Memorial. The team finished seventh overall and won the S3.0 class. The Fontana Barchetta won three hillclimb events in 1950 with Giovanni Bracco and Vittorio Marzotto, before a conversion to a bigger capacity.

In 1951 at the XI. Giro di Sicilia, Piero Taruffi and Ettore Salani drove the Barchetta to a second place overall, just behind the 212 Export. A single 195 S was entered for the 1951 Mille Miglia, but for Serafini/Salani duo the race ended in an accident. Briggs Cunningham campaigned his car from Sebring for the 1951 season, starting with National Buenos Aires. Jim Kimberly achieved a seventh place overall and won the S3.0 class. At the Bridgehampton Sports Car Races, Phil Walters scored second places in Mecox Trophy and 100 mile Cup race, also winning its D group. John Fitch also finished second at the SCCA National Watkins Glen in Seneca Cup.
