= Ferrari 225 S =

1952 Italian two-seater sports car

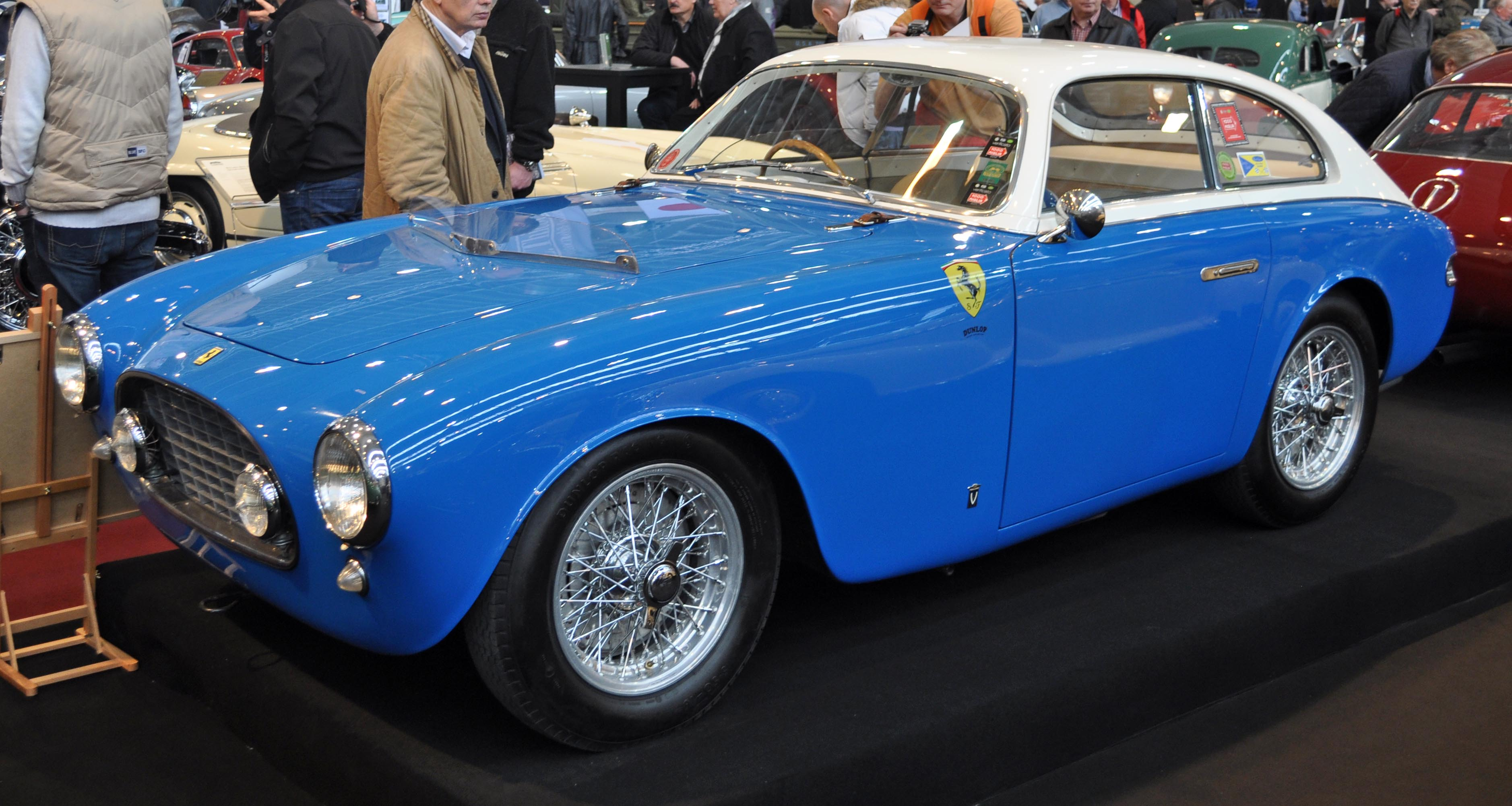

Overview
- Manufacturer: Ferrari
- Also called: Ferrari 225 Sport
- Production: 1952; 21 produced
- Designer: Giovanni Michelotti at Vignale

Body and chassis
- Body style: Spyder; Berlinetta
- Layout: Front mid-engine, rear-wheel-drive

Powertrain
- Engine: 2.7 L (2715.46 cc) Colombo V12
- Power output: 210 PS
- Transmission: 5-speed manual

Dimensions
- Wheelbase: 2,250 mm (88.6 in)
- Curb weight: 850 kg (1,874 lb) (dry)

Chronology
- Predecessor: Ferrari 212 Export
- Successor: Ferrari 250 S

The Ferrari 225 S is a sports car produced by Ferrari in 1952. It was an evolution over the preceding Ferrari 212 Export with important engine upgrades that greatly improved power output. The model was extensively used in competition, winning many international races. The most important include 1952 Monaco Grand Prix for sports cars, Portuguese Grand Prix, Coppa d'Oro di Sicilia, Coppa della Toscana, Coppa d'Oro delle Dolomiti and many others. It was the final Colombo V12 engine iteration before the 250-family stretched it to 3.0-litres capacity.

== Development ==
The 1952 Ferrari 225 S was a continued development from the 212 Export sports car. The new car shared many common aspects over the predecessor with some important improvements. With the similar chassis, so did the wheelbase and track measurements remained the same. The V12 engine received a slightly larger total displacement, due to a bigger bore. The power output benefited greatly from Aurelio Lampredi's technical research. The engine improvements consisted of an innovative and more efficient intake manifold design and an upgraded distribution system. Those improvement will be carried over to the next generation of Colombo V12-engined cars that debuted the very same year.

Most cars used tried and tested tubular steel spaceframe chassis. Those had an "ED" or "EL" serial number suffix. Alternatively the 225 S could be based on an innovative "Tuboscocca" chassis and sport an "ET" suffix.

In total 21 cars were produced. All were right-hand drive as was common for a racing cars. Some were converted from the 212 Export range, like the s/n 0104E, 0170ET or 0190ET. Some were even of a 166 MM ancestry like the s/n 0152EL, the very first 225 S.

=== Bodywork ===
Fourteen open spyder cars were created, bodied by Vignale to a Giovanni Michelotti design. One particular example with a unique bodywork of open style wings was produced. The s/n 0176ED, commissioned by Antonio Stagnoli, also featured small inboard headlights and an outside spare wheel flush with the rear trunk. Additionally six closed Berlinettas also with a Vignale coachwork were made. There was also a single Touring Barchetta, s/n 0166ED, that was raced by Eugenio Castellotti. Ferrari continued to lose interest in Carrozzeria Touring and focused on other coachbuilders. Vignale was still in favour but would soon be replaced by Pinin Farina and Scaglietti.

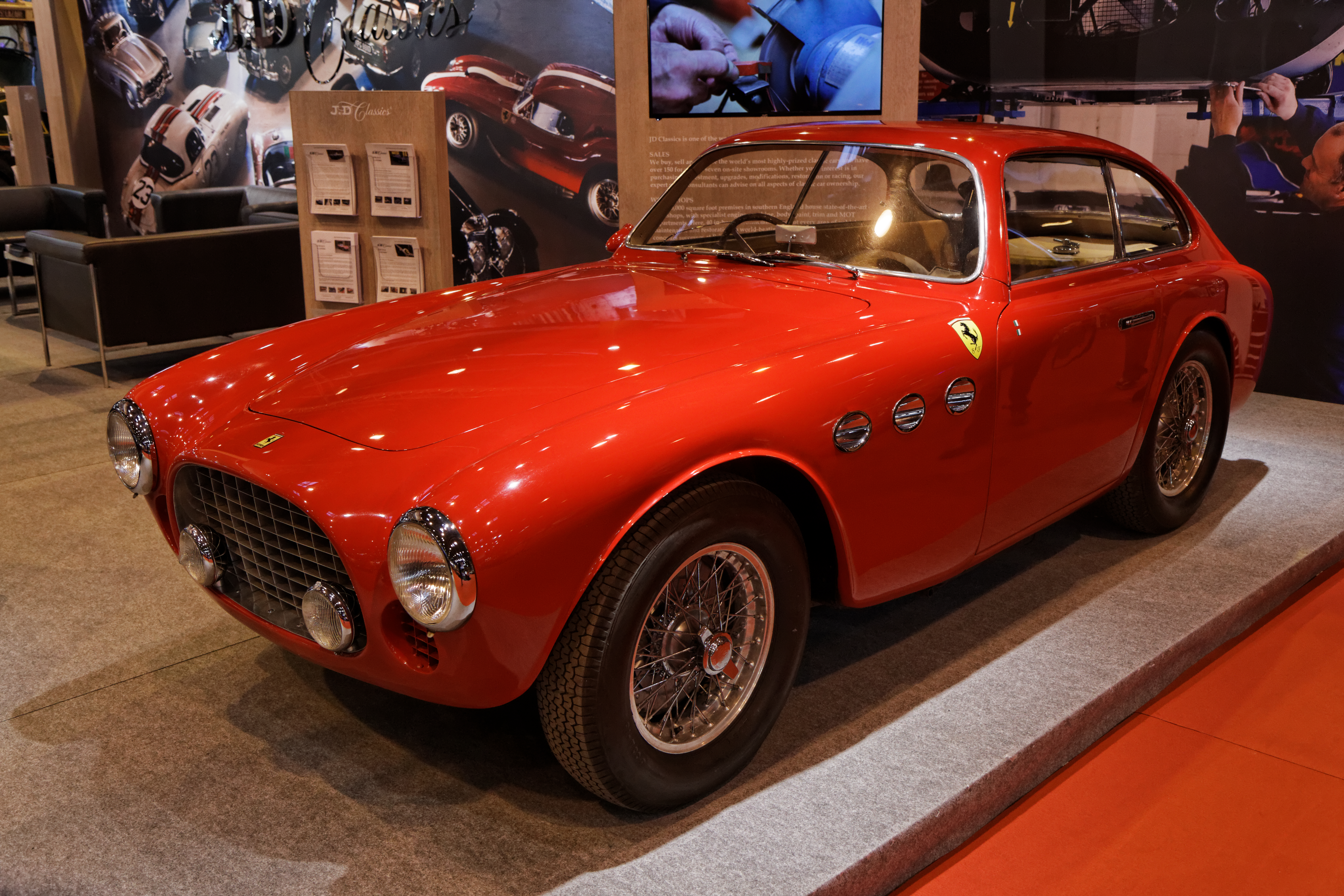
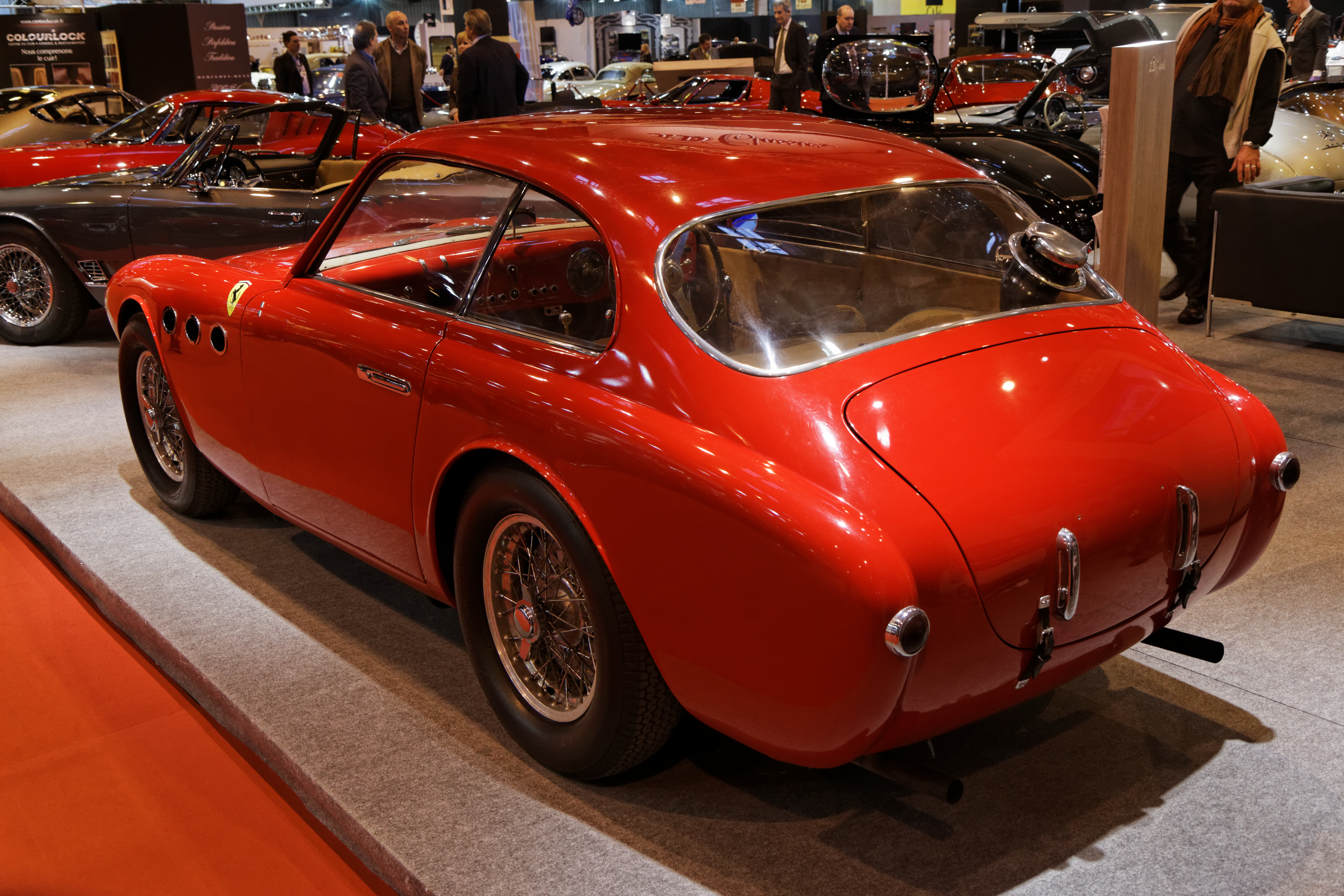
Ferrari 225 S Vignale Berlinetta

== Specifications ==
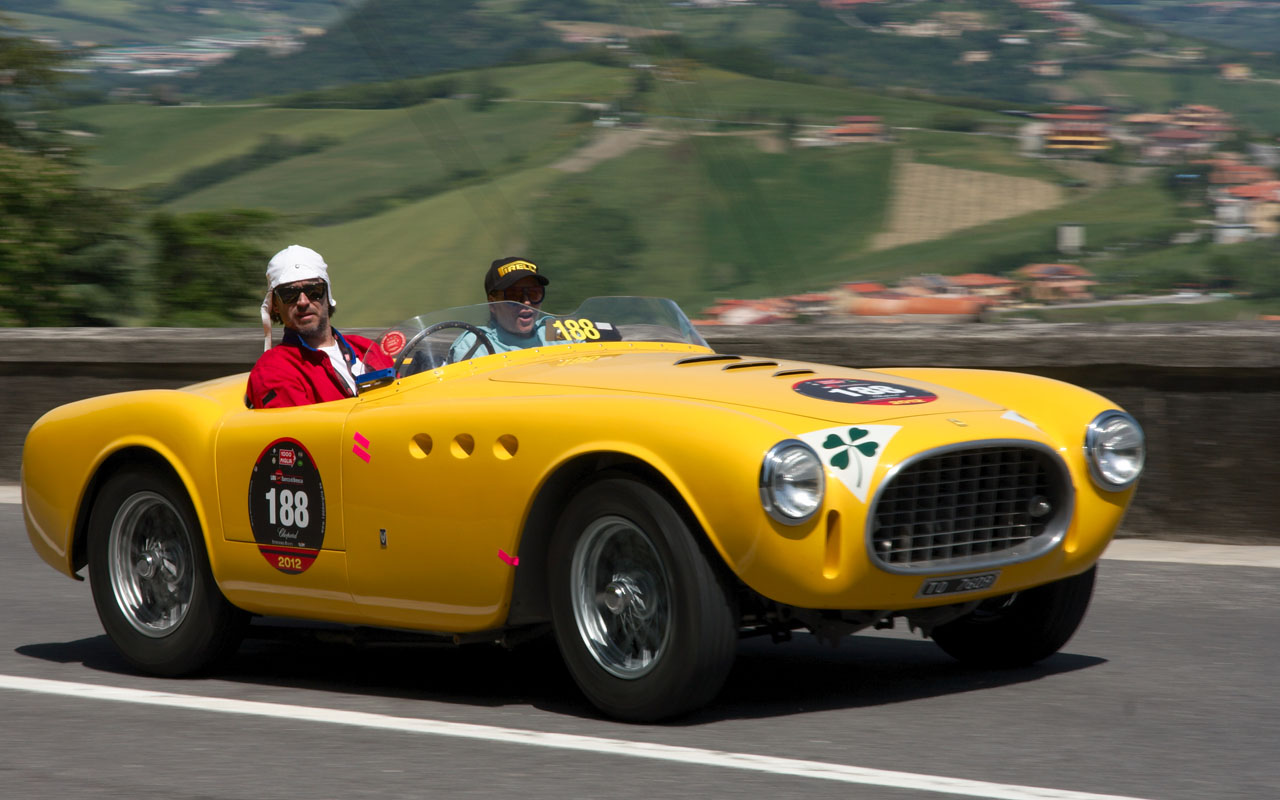
225 S Spyder by Vignale during 2012 Mille Miglia Storica

=== Engine ===
The 225 S Colombo V12 engine was based on the power unit from the Ferrari 212, but had the cylinders bored out a further 2 mm as opposed to an older 2.6-litre engine. The internal measurements were now 70 by 58.8 mm (2.8 by 2.3 in) of bore and stroke and the resulting total capacity was 2,715.46 cc (2.7 L; 165.7 cu in). Thanks to Lampredi's redesigned intake manifold and distribution, the power output grew from 165 PS to a 210 PS (154 kW; 207 hp) at 7200 rpm. Compression ratio was 8.5:1. The engine had a single overhead camshaft per cylinder bank, actuating two valves. Fuel was fed by three Weber 36DCF carburettors. There was also a single spark plug per cylinder served by two ignition coils. A single-plate clutch and a wet sump lubrication was installed.

=== Suspension and transmission ===
The front suspension was independent with double wishbones, transverse leaf spring and hydraulic shock absorbers. The rear consisted of a live axle with twin semi-elliptical springs and hydraulic shock absorbers. The preceding 212 Export had a Houdaille-type shock absorbers and single springs at the rear. Hydraulic drum brakes were mounted on all wheels and transmission was a five-speed, non-synchronised type.

=== Tuboscocca chassis ===
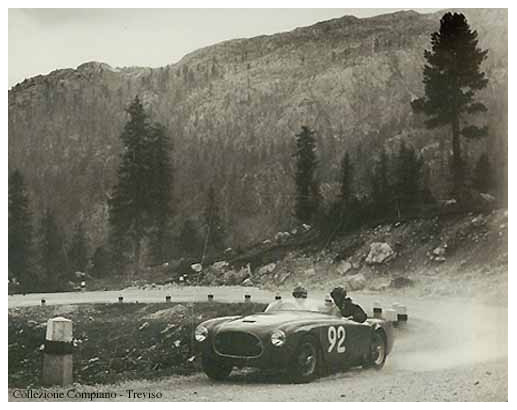
Paolo Marzotto and Marino Marini winning 1952 Coppa d' Oro delle Dolomiti

The Ferrari 225 S was mounted upon two types of chassis design. One was a tubular spaceframe created of an elliptical-section steel tubes, the other was a tubular semi-monocoque called Tuboscocca. Both those chassis were already used on the previous sports cars and retained 2,250 mm (88.6 in) of wheelbase.

The tubular chassis known as the Tuboscocca was designed and realised by Gilberto Colombo's Gilco chassis specialist company, exclusively for the racing cars. "Tubo-scocca" in Italian meaning "tube-body". Few select examples received a smaller diameter tubular trellis-frame with additional truss-type cross-braces. The new chassis was slightly lighter than the original tubular steel chassis and provided increased rigidity and additional strength. This design was introduced on a 1951 Ferrari 212 Inter Touring Berlinetta, s/n 0141ET, that was used in competition by "Pagnibon" (Pierre Boncompagni) and was later offered for the 212 Export and 225 S ranges.

In total, eight 225 S' were mounted on the Tuboscocca chassis, six Vignale Spyders and further two Berlinettas. According to Gilco only fifteen such chassis were built in total, initially for the 212 Export range.

== Racing ==
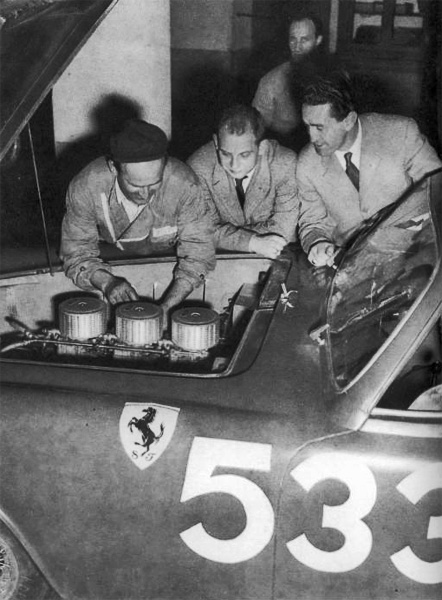
225 S during 1952 Mille Miglia, achieved 10th place overall by Franco Bordoni and Geronimo

The first outing for the Ferrari 225 S was at the 1952 Giro di Sicilia. Six cars were entered. Four did not finish the race altogether. The best score was a fifth place overall and a win in class by Eugenio Castellotti and Annibale Broglia in an only Touring Barchetta s/n 0166ED, entered by Scuderia Guastella, followed by another 225 S Vignale driven by Franco Bordoni. All of the fasters cars were in a lower capacity categories. The first victory came later the same year at the Coppa d'Oro di Sicilia. Castellotti drove the same barchetta as before.

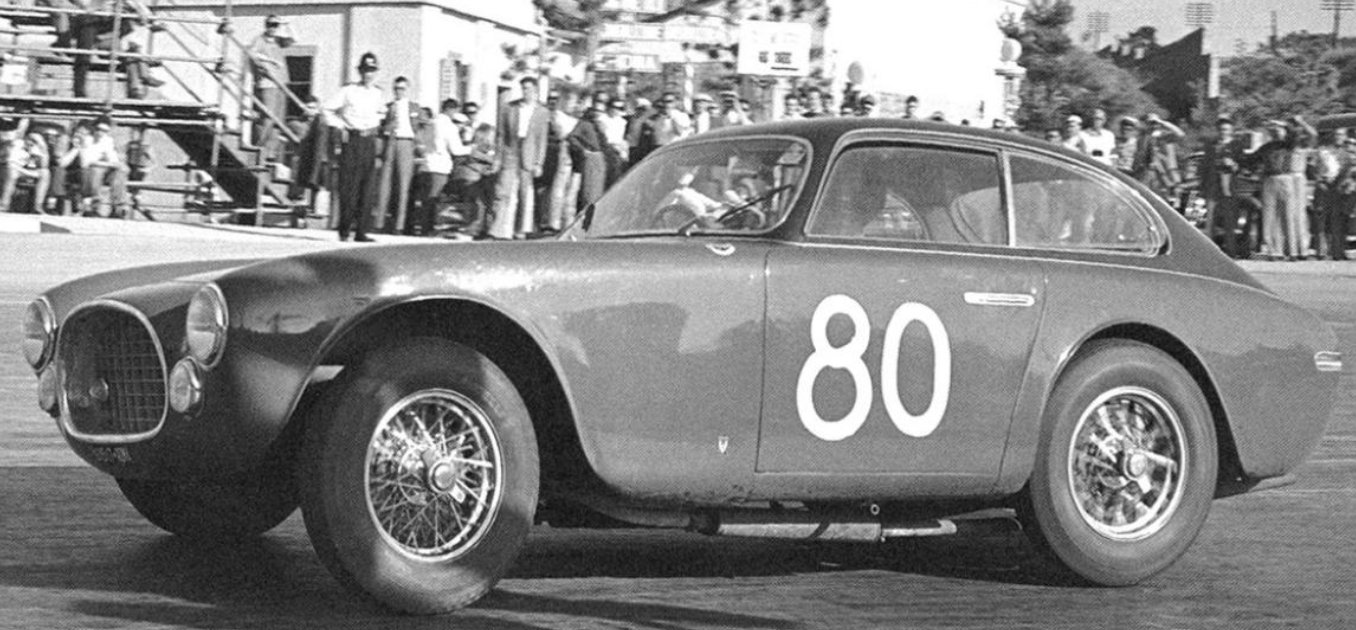
225 S during 1952 Trieste-Opicina hillclimb

For the 1952 Mille Miglia, seven cars were entered with the best result a 2nd in class and 10th overall by Bordoni. Later the same year, at the 12 Hours of Casablanca race, Jean Lucas with Jacques Péron achieved a second place, only a lap behind the winning Talbot-Lago T26GS. Later, Bruno Sterzi and Arnoldo Roselli scored a victory at the Coppa della Toscana in a Vignale Berlinetta s/n 0178ED.

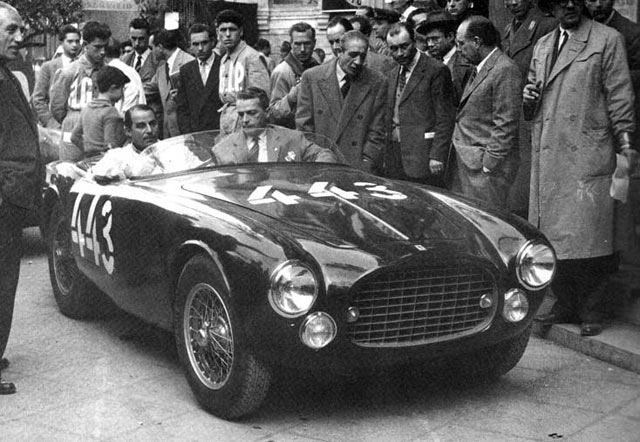
Mario Vandelli and race director Nello Ugolini (right) in 225 S s/n 0160ED at XII Giro di Sicilia

For the 1952 Monaco Grand Prix for sports cars, Ferrari had entered no less than six 225 S', out of twenty participants. The Ferrari 225 S had scored first five places in the race. After 100 laps, Vittorio Marzotto was the winner, followed by Eugenio Castellotti, Stagnoli / Biondetti, Jean Lucas and "Pagnibon". Giovanni Bracco driving the 212/225 S did not finish the race. It was the first ever win in Monaco for Ferrari. Luigi Faglioli lost his life because of the accident during practice. Later the same year, Lucas won at the Circuit d'Orleans and Pietro Palmieri won Trieste-Opicina hillclimb.

The 1952 24 Hours of Le Mans was contested by "Pagnibon" and Tom Cole. They drove a Vignale Berlinetta, s/n 0152EL, entered by Scuderia Ferrari. The team retired with an electrical problems after eleven hours of racing. Later the same year, at the Portuguese Grand Prix for sports cars that was organised on the Circuito da Boavista, Ferrari had entered five cars. Eugenio Castellotti with Scuderia Guastella had come first with his Touring Barchetta. Second place went to privateer Casimiro de Oliveira in a Vignale Spyder. Antonio Stagnoli in a unique Vignale Spyder, s/n 0176ED, was third. Two other cars retired. Later, Jean Luca scored another victory at the Circuit de Bressuire in the same berlinetta he drove at Casablanca.

For the 1952 Targa Florio only one car was raced. A "Tuboscocca" Vignale Spyder, s/n 0194ET, driven by Tom Cole finished eleventh overall and fourth in class. Later the same year, at the Coppa d'Oro delle Dolomiti, four cars were entered. All had finished, but Paolo Marzotto with Marino Marini, entered as Scuderia Marzotto had won that race. The same duo in the same Vignale Spyder s/n 0172ET, also won the Giro delle Calabria, and Marzotto alone also won at the Circuito di Senigallia in a 'Sport+2.0' category. At the first edition of the 12 Hours of Pescara race, Luigi Piotti and Vittorugo Mallucci finished third overall. They drove the 212/225 S s/n 0104E and the winning car was the new 3.0-litre 250 S.

Ferrari 225 S scored second and third in the first installment of the Goodwood Nine Hours. Tom Cole with Graham Whitehead were second and Bobby Baird/Roy Salvadori duo, third. Also in 1952, Bruno Sterzi in a Vignale Spyder, s/n 0178ED, won the Coppa Inter-Europa on Monza.

In September 1952, the second edition of the Tour de France marathon was contested by "Pagnibon" and Adolfo Macchieraldo. They drove a berlinetta s/n 0152EL, and after eight days of racing, finished second overall. Years later Ferrari will dominate this race in their 3.0-litre powered berlinettas. Later the same year, Roborto Bonomi won the National Buenos Aires in a spyder.

In 1953 at the National Buenos Aires, Ferrari 225 S scored 1–2–3 victory. Winner was Roberto Bonomi in the same spyder as before. José M. Collazo was second and José-Maria Ibanez, third. Later the same year, Ferrari entered three cars for the 12 Hours of Sebring in the US. Two cars did not finish but the Vignale Berlinetta of the Robert Yung and Peter S. Yung arrived at an eight place overall and second in class. At the Targa Florio, the best result for the 225 S was a ninth place of Antonio Stagnoli. Eugenio Castellotti retired with a broken axle.

After 1953, the Ferrari 225 S was campaigned on various race tracks with many accomplishments in the US, Argentina, Brazil, Portugal and Italy till 1959.

== Collectability ==
The Ferrari 225 S has aspects of a collector's car: beautiful design, racing pedigree, limited production numbers, and the marque's heritage. Many cars won important races or were raced by well known and accomplished drivers. Price- increasing factors also include a rare, competition-only "Tuboscocca" chassis. Auction prices rose over the years. The most recent estimates are over five times the auction prices fifteen years earlier.

The 1952 Ferrari 225 Sport Spyder Vignale, was sold in 2004 for US$995,500 by RM Auctions. The 212/225 Sport Berlinetta by Vignale, s/n 0170ET, was sold in 2010 for €644,000 by RM Auctions. The 1952 Ferrari 225 S "Tuboscocca" Berlinetta, s/n 0168ED, was sold for US$880,000 at the 2011 Gooding & Company auction. The 225 Sport Spyder "Tuboscocca" by Carrozzeria Vignale, was sold for €2.5 million at the 2012 auction. The 225 Sport Berlinetta "Tuboscocca" by Vignale, s/n 0168ED, was sold again for US$1.2 million in 2013 by RM Auctions. The 1952 Ferrari 225 Sport Spyder by Vignale, was estimated at US$4–5 million in 2019 by RM Sotheby's.

At the 2020 Elkhart Collection auction by RM Sotheby's, the 1952 Ferrari 225 S Vignale Berlinetta that entered both Mille Miglia and 12 hours of Casablanca, will be offered for sale at an estimate of US$2.5–3 million.

== Bibliography ==
- Acerbi, Leonardo (2012). Ferrari: All The Cars. Haynes Publishing. ISBN 978-1-84425-581-8.
