= 1952 Monaco Grand Prix =

Coordinates: 43°44′4.74″N 7°25′16.8″E

- Non-championship sports car race

Race details
- Date: 2 June 1952
- Official name: XII Grand Prix Automobile de Monaco
- Location: Circuit de Monaco
- Course: Street circuit
- Course length: 3.180 km (1.976 miles)
- Distance: 100 laps, 318.0 km (197.6 miles)

Pole position
Driver	(France) Pierre Levegh	Talbot-Lago
- Time: 2:00.2

Fastest lap
Driver	(Italy) Antonio Stagnoli	Ferrari
- Time: 1:56.4

Podium
First	(Italy) Vittorio Marzotto	Ferrari
Second	(Italy) Eugenio Castellotti	Ferrari
Third	(Italy) Antonio Stagnoli (Italy) Clemente Biondetti	Ferrari

The 1952 Monaco Grand Prix was a non-championship sports car race held on 2 June 1952 at Monaco.

After the 1937 Monaco Grand Prix, the race was discontinued due to financial reasons. Until resuming with the 1955 Monaco Grand Prix, only two attempts to re-establish single-seater racing were made, the 1948 Monaco Grand Prix and the 1950 Monaco Grand Prix for the new F1 World Championship, which due to lack of F1 cars in 1952 was run with Formula 2.

Monaco decided to skip the small F2 cars and invite sportscars instead. The race for the smaller cars up to 2 liter saw a practise crash of Luigi Fagioli who had driven his Lancia Aurelia B20 GT to a surprise 3rd overall at the Mille Miglia. He suffered broken bones and died after three weeks.

For the second time since the 1950 Monaco Grand Prix, the 1952 Grand Prix suffered a multi-car pileup.

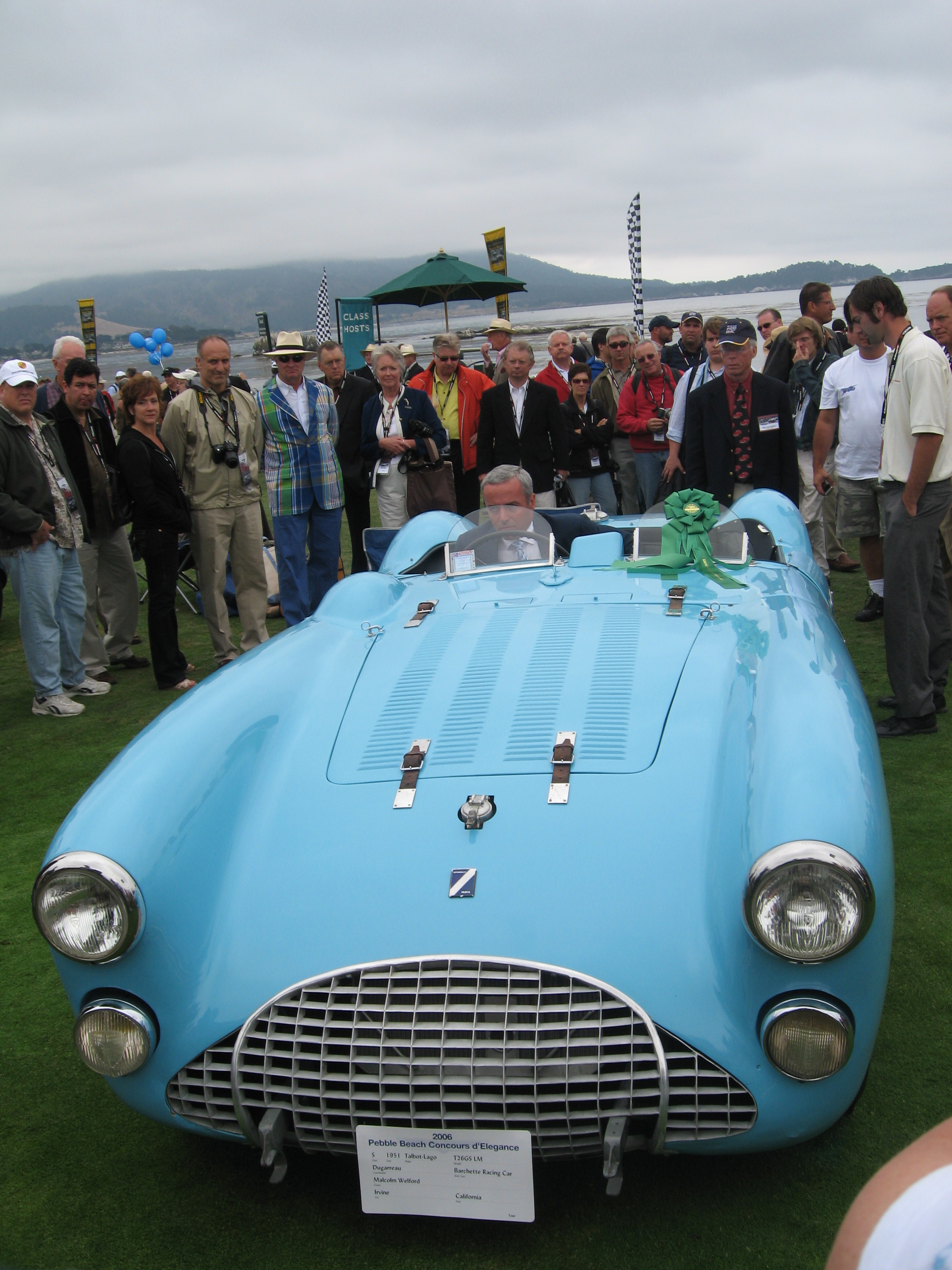
Talbot-Lago Type 26 Grand Sport as driven by Pierre Levegh at 1952 Le Mans. In Monaco he set pole at 2:00.2

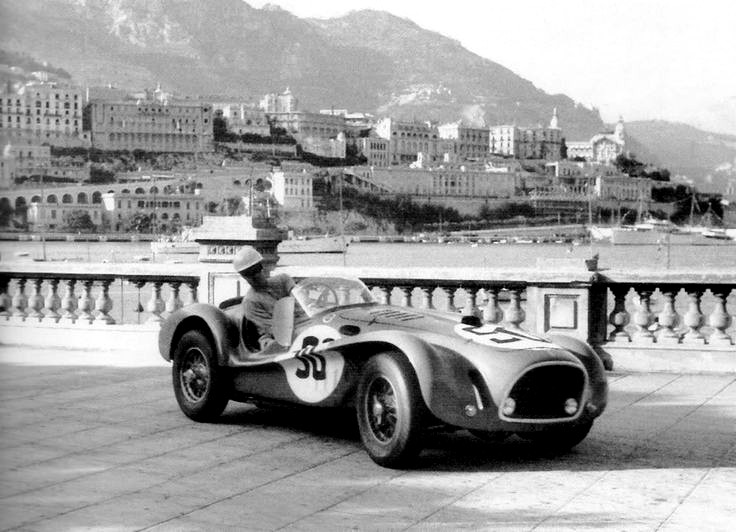
Ferrari 225 S Nr. 90 with Vignale-cycle-type wings driven by Antonio Stagnoli or Clemente Biondetti at the harbour. Stagnoli set fastest race lap at 1:56.4

== Entries ==
No	Driver	Entrant	Car
52	(Spain) Juan Jover	Pegaso	Pegaso Z-102
54	(Spain) Joaquin Palacio Pover	Pegaso	Pegaso Z-102
56	(France) Robert Manzon	Equipe Gordini	Gordini T15S
58	(France) Jean Lucas	Luigi Chinetti	Ferrari 225 S
60	(France) Pierre Boncompagni	Private	Ferrari 225 S
62	(France) René Cotton	Private	Delahaye 135S
64	(France) Louis Rosier (France) Maurice Trintignant	Private	Talbot-Lago T26GS
66	(France) Louis Rosier (France) Maurice Trintignant	Private	Talbot-Lago T26GS
68	(France) Pierre Levegh	Private	Talbot-Lago T26GS
70	(France) Pierre Meyrat	Private	Talbot-Lago T26GS
72	(United Kingdom) Reg Parnell	Aston Martin	Aston Martin DB3
74	(United Kingdom) Peter Collins	Aston Martin	Aston Martin DB3
76	(United Kingdom) Lance Macklin	Aston Martin	Aston Martin DB3
78	(United Kingdom) Stirling Moss	Jaguar Cars	Jaguar C-Type
80	(United Kingdom) Leslie Johnson		Jaguar C-Type
82	(United Kingdom) Tommy Wisdom	Private	Jaguar C-Type
84	(United Kingdom) Anthony Hume	Archie Bride	Allard J2X
86	(Italy) Francesco Buonaccorsi		Ferrari 166 MM/Ferrari 225 S
88	(Italy) Giovanni Bracco	Scuderia Guastalla	Ferrari 225 S
90	(Italy) Antonio Stagnoli (Italy) Clemente Biondetti	Scuderia Guastalla	Ferrari 225 S
92	(Italy) Eugenio Castellotti	Scuderia Guastalla	Ferrari 225 S
94	(Italy) Vittorio Marzotto	Scuderia Marzotto	Ferrari 225 S
96	(Italy) Piero Carini	Scuderia Marzotto	Ferrari 340 America
98	(France) André Simon		Ferrari 225 S
100	(Portugal) Fernando Mascarenhas	Private	Allard J2X

== Classification ==
=== Race ===
Pos	No	Driver	Constructor	Laps	Time/Retired	Grid
1	94	(Italy) Vittorio Marzotto	Ferrari	100	3:21:28.4	11
2	92	(Italy) Eugenio Castellotti	Ferrari	100	+15.5	10
3	90	(Italy) Antonio Stagnoli (Italy) Clemente Biondetti	Ferrari	98	+2 Laps	3
4	58	(France) Jean Lucas	Ferrari	96	+4 Laps	15
5	60	(France) Pierre Boncompagni	Ferrari	95	+5 Laps	8
6	82	(United Kingdom) Tommy Wisdom	Jaguar	95	+5 Laps	16
7	74	(United Kingdom) Peter Collins	Aston Martin	92	+8 Laps	12
8	62	(France) René Cotton	Delahaye	85	+15 Laps	18
Ret	76	(United Kingdom) Lance Macklin	Aston Martin	73	Engine	6
Ret	100	(Portugal) Fernando Mascarenhas	Allard	64	Split tank	17
Ret	78	(United Kingdom) Stirling Moss	Jaguar	46	Accident	2
Ret	64	(France) Louis Rosier (France) Maurice Trintignant	Talbot-Lago	37		7
Ret	96	(Italy) Piero Carini	Ferrari	37	Accident	13
Ret	56	(France) Robert Manzon	Gordini	24	Accident	5
Ret	84	(United Kingdom) Anthony Hume	Allard	22	Accident	14
Ret	72	(United Kingdom) Reg Parnell	Aston Martin	18	Engine	4
Ret	88	(Italy) Giovanni Bracco	Ferrari	8	Brakes	9
Ret	68	(France) Pierre Levegh	Talbot-Lago	5	Camshaft	1
DNS	54	(Spain) Joaquín Palacio Pover	Pegaso			
DNQ	52	(Spain) Juan Jover	Pegaso			
