= Dolomites Gold Cup Race =

Former automobile race held in Italy

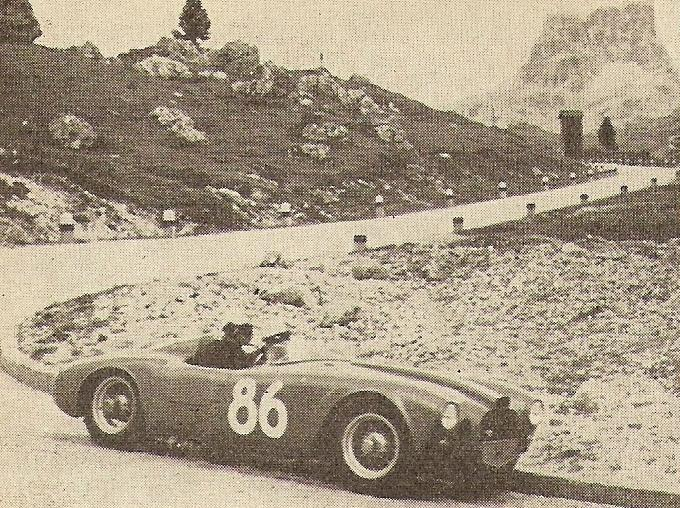
Piero Taruffi during the 1953 event

The Dolomites Gold Cup Race (translation: Coppa d'Oro delle Dolomiti) was a car race on public roads open to traffic, which was run in the Dolomite Mountains of northern Italy for ten years from 1947 to 1956. It took place along an anti-clockwise circuit that was 304 km (188 miles) long and usually took about 3 to 4 hours to complete the one lap that made up the race distance, with the start and finish in the town of Cortina d'Ampezzo. The circuit went through many Italian towns, and it had nearly 2,000 meters (2 km, 1.25 miles, or 6,600 feet) of elevation change- more than 6 1/2 times that of the Nürburgring and the Isle of Man TT track.

The official name of the race has changed over the years. In 1947, it was known as the "Cup of the Dolomites", from 1948 to 1950 it was known as the "International Cup of the Dolomites", and in 1951 it was renamed the "Gold Cup of the Dolomites".

The race was not continued after 1956, after the fatal accident of Spaniard Alfonso de Portago at the 1957 Mille Miglia, which killed 9 spectators, prompting the Italian government to temporarily ban racing on public roads.

The race was established by the Automobile Club of Belluno, which is still the organiser of the now historic motorsport event, since 1972. The race is included in the FIA international calendar as "Big Event CSAI" classic regularity.

== The race ==
The race's official title has changed over the years. On its foundation in 1947, it was the Coppa delle Dolomiti (Dolomites Cup); then from 1948 to 1950 it became the Coppa Internazionale delle Dolomiti (International Dolomites Cup). From 1951 on, the title became the definitive Coppa d'Oro delle Dolomiti (Dolomites Gold Cup).

In the course of the race's history, the Gold Cup was awarded to the driver achieving the best result over three successive years. From the three races in 1950-1952 it was awarded to Salvatore Amendola, and in the following three-year period from 1953-1955 to Giulio Cabianca.

The race was started and run like a rally, where drivers started individually at timed intervals, racing against the clock, like the Mille Miglia and the Targa Florio.

== Categories ==
During the historical races from 1947 to 1956, automobiles were divided into categories, each of which was subdivided into classes by the engine capacity in cubic centimetres.

== The trophy and its allocation ==
The trophy for the winner is an artistic reproduction of the kilometre milestone of SS 48 in Cortina d'Ampezzo, embedded in a block of Dolomite rocks, this makes up of peaks of these mountains.

In the historical period of the race, the Gold Cup was definitively assigned to the driver who obtained the best result by adding the times achieved in three consecutive years. In 1950-1952, Salvatore Ammendola won the Cup, and in the following three years, 1953-1955, Giulio Cabianca won the prize.

== Circuit route(meters/ft) ==
- Cortina d'Ampezzo (1210 m/3970 ft) -
- Pocol (1530 m/5020 ft) –
- Passo Falzarego (2105 m/6906 ft) –
- Andraz (1392 m/4567 ft) –
- Pieve di Livinallongo (1465 m/4806 ft) –
- Arabba (1591 m/5219 ft) –
- Pordoi Pass (2239 m/7346 ft) –
- Sella Pass junction (1819 m/5968 ft) –
- Canazei (1467 m/4813 ft) –
- Vigo di Fassa (1342 m/4403 ft) –
- Moena (1184 m/3885 ft) –
- Predazzo (1114 m/3655 ft) –
- Rolle Pass (1970 m/6463 ft) –
- San Martino di Castrozza (1467 m/4813 ft) –
- Fiera di Primiero (713 m/2339 ft) –
- Fonzaso (329 m/1079 ft) –
- Feltre (325 m/1066 ft) –
- Belluno (389 m/1276 ft) –
- Longarone (472 m/1549 ft) –
- Pieve di Cadore (878 m/2884 ft) –
- Auronzo (864 m/2835 ft) –
- Misurina (1756 m/4761 ft) –
- Carbonin (1437 m/4715 ft) –
- Passo Cimabanche (1529 m/5016 ft) –
- Cortina d’Ampezzo (1210 m/3970 ft)

== Top 3 results for each race ==
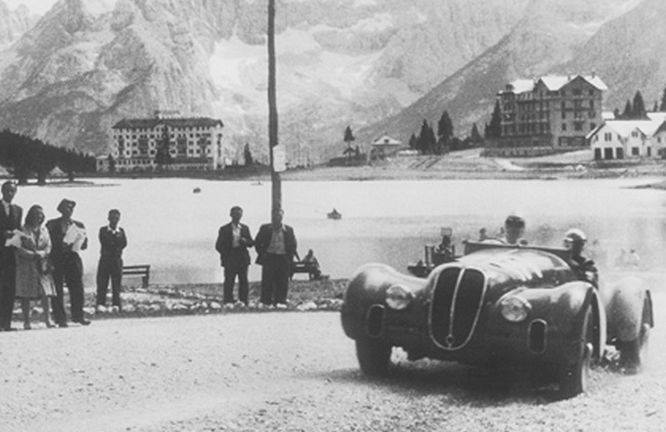
Salvatore Ammendola won the first edition in 1947

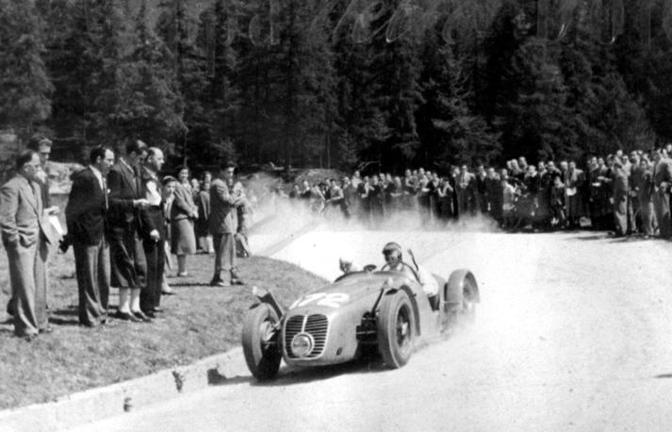
Winner of the second edition in 1948, Giovanni Bracco in Maserati A6GCS

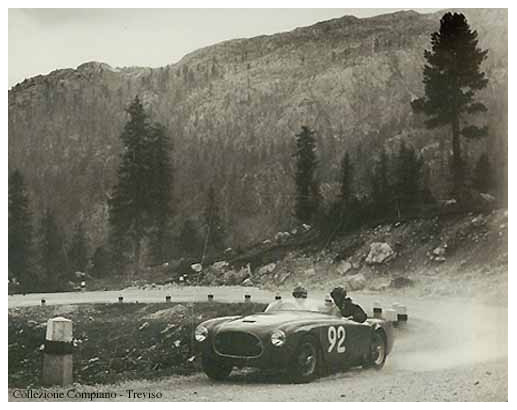
Paolo Marzotto won his first "Dolomites Cup" in Ferrari 225 S Vignale Spyder in 1952

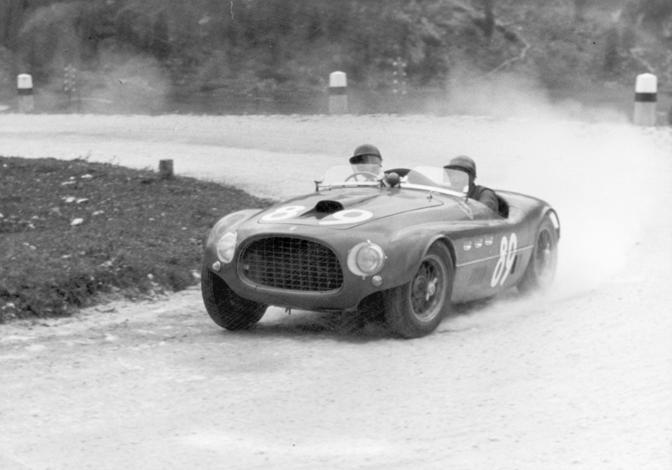
Ferrari 250 MM Vignale Spyder driven to victory by Paolo Marzotto in 1953

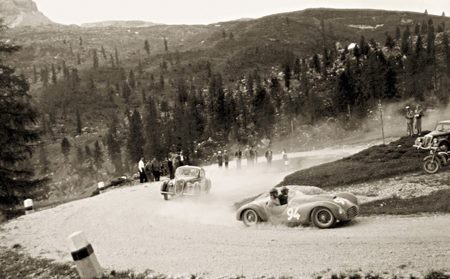
Maserati A6GCS driven to victory by Sergio Mantovani in 1954

1947 - 20 July / The Cup of the Dolomites

1. Salvatore Ammendola - Alfa Romeo 6C 2500 SS - 3h58m18s 76.492 km/h (47.529 mph)
2. Piero Dusio - Cisitalia 202 MM - 4h01m45s "
3. Alberto Gidoni - Fiat 1100 S Gidoni - 4h03m06s "

1948 - 11 July / II International Cup of the Dolomites

1. Giovanni Bracco - Maserati A6GCS - 3h40m47s - 82.560 km/h (51.300 mph)
2. Luigi Villoresi - Maserati A6GCS - 3h44m32s
3. Soave Besana - Ferrari 166 SC - 3h45m57s

1949 - 17 July / III International Cup of the Dolomites

1. Roberto Vallone - Ferrari 166 SC- 3h45m02s - 81.001 km/h (50.332 mph)
2. Franco Cornacchia - Ferrari 166 MM - 3h48m19s
3. Franco Rol - Alfa Romeo 6C 2500 Competizione - 3h48m20s

1950 - 16 July / IV International Cup of the Dolomites

1. Giannino Marzotto - Ferrari 166 MM - 3h34m31s - 84.972 km/h (52.799 mph)
2. Giovanni Bracco - Maserati A6GCS - 3h34m45s
3. Franco Cornacchia - Ferrari 195 S - 3h41m39s

1951 - 15 July / V Gold Cup of the Dolomites

1. Enrico Anselmi - Lancia Aurelia B20 - 3h45m07s -80.971 km/h (50.313 mph)
2. Umberto Castiglioni - Lancia Aurelia B20 - 3h47m30s
3. Giulio Cabianca - Osca MT4 1100 - 3h47m37s

1952 - 13 July / VI Gold Cup of the Dolomites

1. Paolo Marzotto - Ferrari 225 S - 3h22m25s - 84.528 km/h (52.523 mph)
2. Giannino Marzotto - Ferrari 340 America - 3h25m57s
3. Giulio Cabianca - Osca MT4 1100 - 3h33'49

1953 - 12 July / VII Gold Cup of the Dolomites

1. Paolo Marzotto - Ferrari 250 MM - 3h18m19s - 91.913 km/h (57.112 mph)
2. Piero Taruffi - Lancia D23 - 3h19m52s
3. Umberto Maglioli - Ferrari 735 S - 3h20m02s

1954 - 11 July / VIII Gold Cup of the Dolomites

1. Sergio Mantovani - Maserati A6GCS - 3h19m36s - 91.319 km (56.743 mph)
2. Giulio Cabianca - Osca MT4 1500 - 3h20m23s
3. Gerino Gerini - Ferrari 250 Monza - 3h20m30s

1955 - 10 July / IX Gold Cup of the Dolomites

1. Olivier Gendebien - Mercedes-Benz 300 SL - 3h23m01s - 89.779 km/h (55.786 mph)
2. Eugenio Castellotti - Ferrari 500 Mondial - 3h23m22s
3. Giulio Cabianca - Osca MT4 1500 - 3h27m02s

1956 - 8 July / X Gold Cup of the Dolomites

1. Giulio Cabianca - Osca MT4 1500 - 3h01m31s - 100.417 km/h (62.396 mph) (lap record)
2. Olivier Gendebien - Ferrari 860 Monza - 3h05m18s
3. Umberto Maglioli - Osca MT4 1500 - 3h09m47s

== Bibliography ==
1. Gianni Cancellieri; Cesare De Agostini, Powder and glory. The Gold Cup of the Dolomites (1947–1956), Giorgio Nada Editore, 2000. ISBN 88-7911-205-8.
2. Carlo Dolcini, The last golden cup of the Dolomites, Patron Editore, 2007. ISBN 8855529358
