= Giovanni Bracco =

Itanian racecar driver (1908–1968)

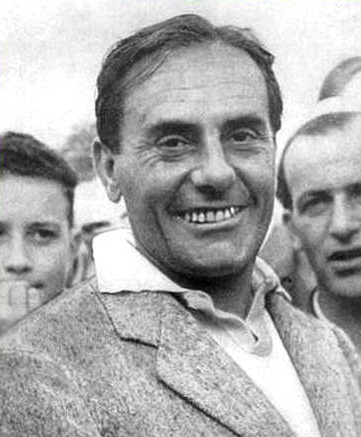

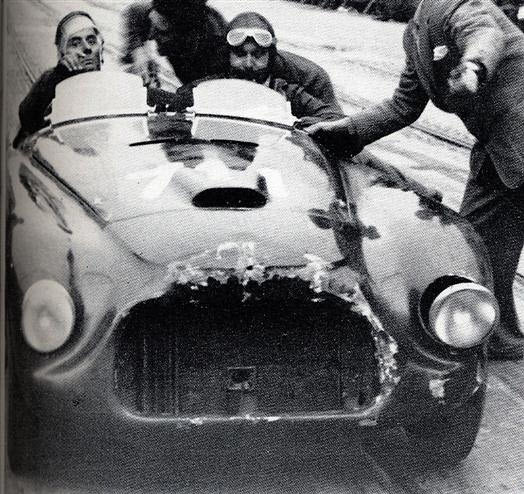
Bracco and Umberto Maglioli in Ferrari 166 s/n 0016M at Mille Miglia on 23 April 1950

Giovanni Bracco (6 June 1908 at Biella – 7 August 1968 at Biella) was an Italian racing car driver.

He lived in Biella, the hometown of other racing aces such as Umberto Maglioli, Mario Porrino and Lamberto Grolla. Before and after World War II he had been racing Lancia Aprilias. He had won the 1948 Italian Grand Prix (2-litre class) in a Maserati A6 GCS, before joining Ferrari for 1950–52, winning the 1952 Mille Miglia in a Ferrari 250 S. With his younger pupil, Umberto Maglioli, he came second in the 1951 Mille Miglia, driving a Lancia Aurelia B20. He raced a Maserati 200S in 1955. At the Modena Grand Prix, on 28 September 1947, he lost control of his Delage 3000, accidentally killing five spectators standing too close to the road.

== Formula One World Championship results ==
(key) (Races in bold indicate pole position; Races in italics indicate fastest lap)

Year	Entrant	Chassis	Engine	1	2	3	4	5	6	7	WDC	Points
1950	Scuderia Ferrari	Ferrari 125	Ferrari V12	GBR	MON	500	SUI	BEL	FRA	ITA; DNA	NC	0
