= Lancia Aprilia =

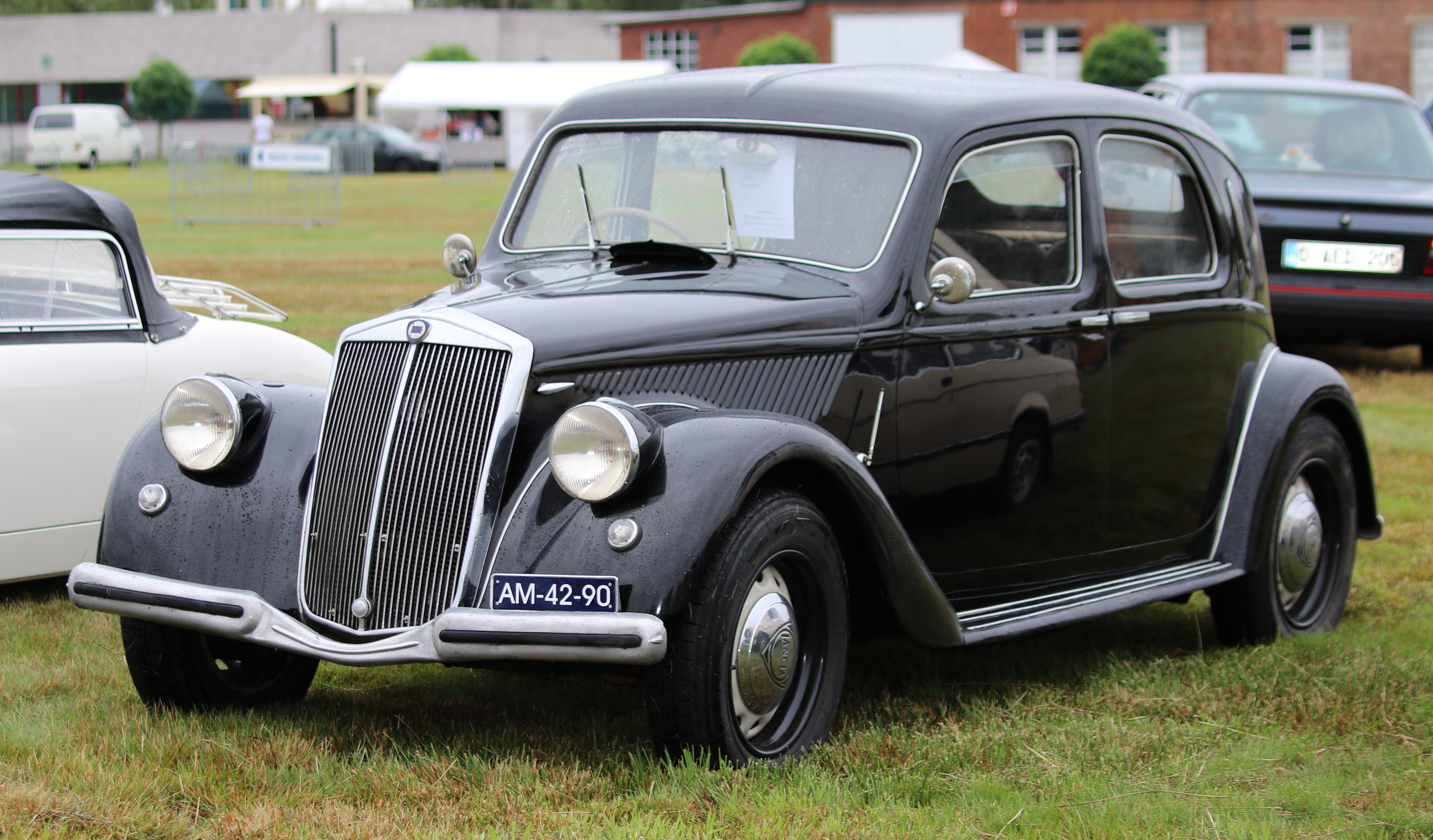

Overview
- Manufacturer: Lancia
- Also called: Lancia Ardennes
- Production: 1937–1949

Body and chassis
- Class: Large family car (D)
- Body style: 4-door saloon, 2-door cabriolet
- Layout: FR layout

Powertrain
- Engine: 1,352 cc V4; 1,486 cc V4

Dimensions
- Wheelbase: 2,750 mm (108 in)
- Length: 3,960 mm (155.9 in)
- Width: 1,470 mm (57.9 in)
- Curb weight: 900 kg (1,984 lb)

Chronology
- Successor: Lancia Aurelia

The Lancia Aprilia (1937–1949) is a family car manufactured by Lancia, one of the first designed using a wind tunnel in collaboration with Battista Farina and Polytechnic University of Turin, achieving a record low drag coefficient of 0.47. The berlinetta aerodinamica was first shown in 1936.

Production commenced in February 1937, the month in which the firm's founder died: this was the last of Vincenzo Lancia's designs, featuring four pillarless doors. The first series (mod. 238, 10,354 units, 1937–39) featured a 1,352 cc V4 motor providing 47 PS (35 kW). The second series (mod. 438, 9,728 units, 1939–49) had its engine capacity increased to 1,486 cc which provided 48 PS (35 kW). A Lusso model of this second series was also offered as well as a lungo (lengthened) version (706 made, 1946–49). A total of 20,082 cars and 7,554 additional chassis for coach built bodies were produced in Turin along with about 700 in France.

With the Aprilia Lancia followed their tradition of offering cars with the steering wheel on the right even in markets seen by other manufacturers as left hand drive markets. Outside the UK and Sweden customers increasingly picked the optional left hand drive versions, however.

Special designs include those by Ugo Zagato (1938), a Carrozzeria Touring convertible, the army's Torpedo militare (World War II), a Luigi Pagani-tuned barchetta bodied by boatbuilders Riva di Merate on a pre-war chassis (1946), a Bertone convertible (1947), one of Michelotti's first, while at Vignale (1949).

The last Aprilia left the factory on October 22, 1949, in its trunk, a farewell note was found:

Cara Aprilia, nel prendere commiato ti porgo un reverente saluto. Il tuo nome glorioso ha saputo imporsi nelle più grandi metropoli, merito di un Grande pioniere scomparso ma sempre vivo il suo nome in noi. Gli artefici di questo grande complesso augurano e aspettano che la sorella che sta per sorgere dia altra tanta gloria e maggior comprensione per il bene di tutti.

Dear Aprilia, as we bid you farewell, we offer you our respectful greetings. Your glorious name has made a name for itself in the greatest cities, thanks to a great pioneer who is no longer with us but whose name lives on in our hearts. The creators of this great complex hope and expect that your sister, who is about to be born, will bring even more glory and greater understanding for the good of all.

== French assembly ==
Lancia had opened their first plant outside Italy at Bonneuil on the south side of Paris in 1931, and the Aprilia was assembled here between 1937 and 1939. The French version was badged as the Lancia Ardennes, but apart from the name and slightly larger headlights (possibly to compensate for the dimming effects of French legislation requiring headlight bulbs to be yellow) the French Lancia Ardennes was indistinguishable from the Turin built Lancia Aprilia. The models assembled in France made it to the market ahead of the Italian cars, being sold from Autumn 1936, whereas the Italian cars were not sold till early 1937, after the worst of the winter was over. Despite being well regarded by enthusiasts, the Lancia Ardennes was overshadowed in the French market place by the pioneering and aggressively priced Citroën Traction. In the context of heightened nationalism and increasing political tension between the political classes in Italy and in France, only 1,620 Lancia Ardennes models had been produced before war put an end to its production.

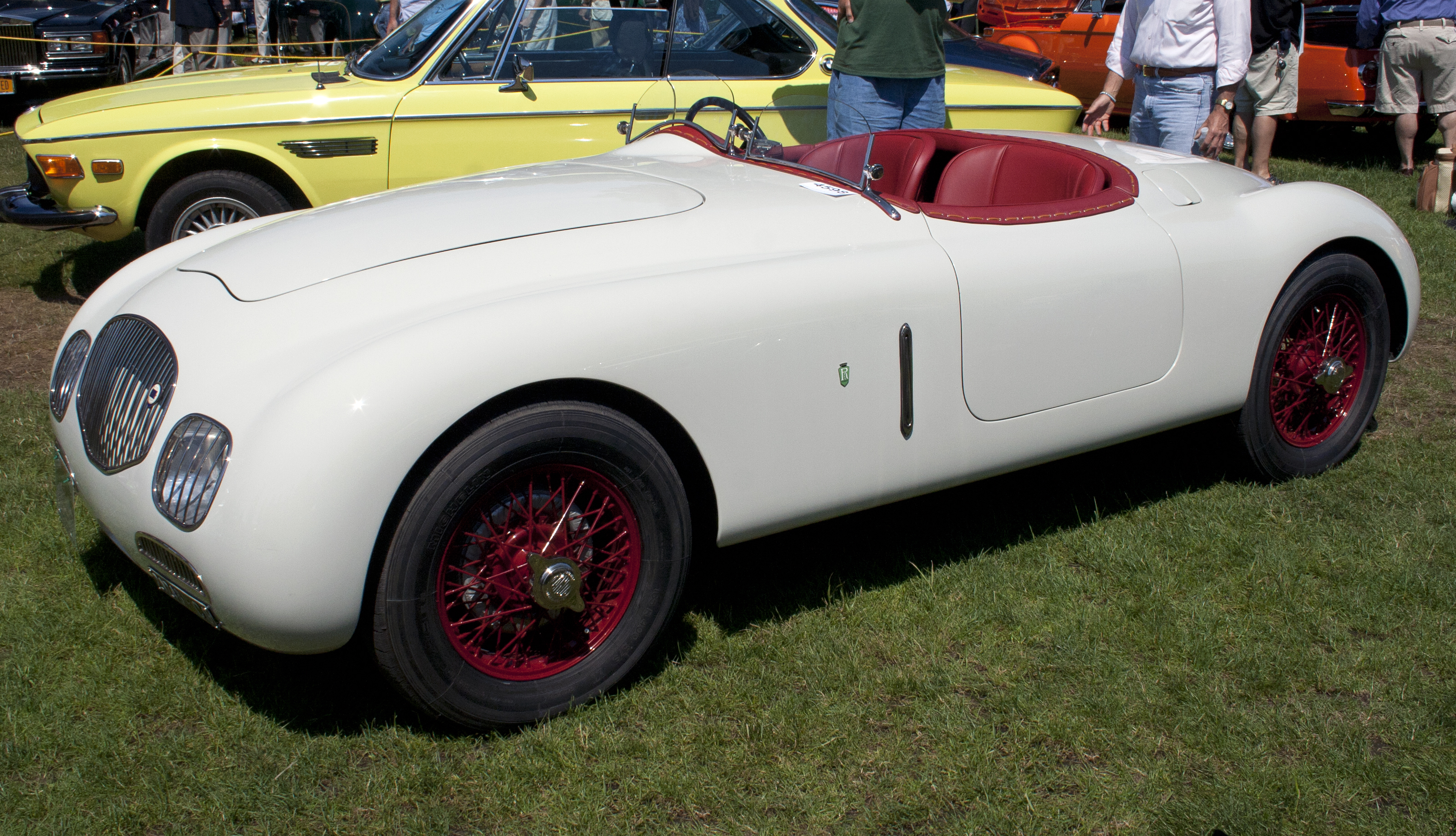
1946 Aprilia Corsa Sport by Riva/Pagani.

== In popular culture ==
The Lancia Aprilia is featured in Land of Black Gold, one of The Adventures of Tintin, in the story's car chase scene. Driven by Tintin with Captain Haddock and Snowy as passengers, they chased the villain Prof. Smith, alias Dr. Müller, who kidnapped Prince Abdullah and tried to run away in the desert.

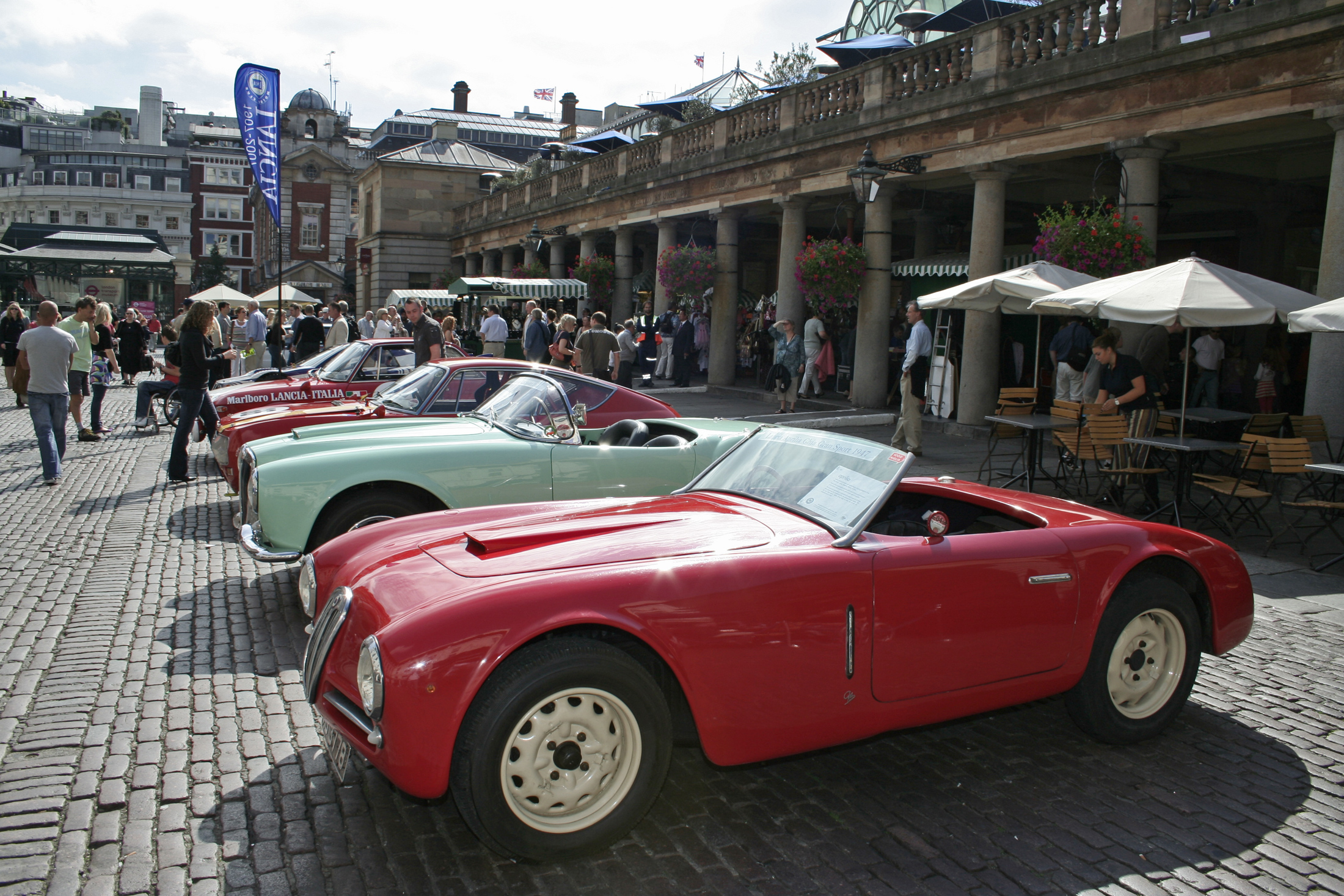
1947 Lancia Aprilia Gran Sport by Ghia.

== See also ==
- Lancia Augusta
