= 195 =

195 may refer to:

- 195 (number), a number
- 195 BC, a year
- AD 195

== Military ==
=== Canada ===
- 195th (City of Regina) Battalion, CEF, a Canadian Expeditionary Force unit

=== United Kingdom ===
- 195th (2/1st Scottish Rifles) Brigade, an infantry brigade of the British Army
- No. 195 Squadron RAF, an aircraft squadron of the Royal Air Force

=== United States ===
- 195th Fighter Squadron, an Arizona Air National Guard unit
- 195th Ohio Infantry Regiment, an infantry regiment of the Union Army
- VFA-195, a fighter squadron of the United States Navy

== Transportation ==
=== Aircraft ===
- Blériot 195, a 1929 French monoplane mail-carrier
- Cessna 195, a 1947–1954 American general aviation airplane

=== Automobiles ===
- Ferrari 195 S, a 1950 Italian sports racing car
- Ferrari 195 Inter, a 1950–1951 Italian grand tourer
- Jordan 195, a 1995 British Formula One car

=== Roads and routes ===
- List of highways numbered 195
  - Interstate 195 (disambiguation)

=== Watercraft ===
- German submarine U-195, a Type IXD1 transport U-boat of Nazi Germany

== Other uses ==
- 195 (New Jersey bus)
- 195 Eurykleia, a main belt asteroid
- 195 Broadway, an early skyscraper in the Financial District of Manhattan, New York City, New York, United States

== See also ==
- 195th (disambiguation)
