= Ferrari Inter =

A Ferrari Inter was one of a number of Ferrari car models built in the early 1950s. The name commemorated Scuderia Inter, a racing team which had achieved some success in 1948 with Ferrari's 166 S racing models. Generally, the Inter models were road-going gran turismo versions of the racing barchettas that the company focused on.

The following cars used the Inter name:

- 1949 166 Inter
- 1950 195 Inter
- 1951 212 Inter
