= 195th Regiment =

195th Regiment may refer to:

- 195th Infantry Regiment (United States)
- 195th Ohio Infantry Regiment, a Union Army regiment during the American Civil War

== See also ==
- 195th (disambiguation)
