= List of highways numbered 194 =

Route 194 or Highway 194 may refer to:

== Japan ==
- Japan National Route 194

== Philippines ==
- National Route 194 (Philippines)

== United Kingdom ==
- A194(M)
- A194 road
- B194 road

== United States ==
- Interstate 194
- Alabama State Route 194 (former)
- California State Route 194 (former)
- Colorado State Highway 194
- Connecticut Route 194
- Georgia State Route 194
- Illinois Route 194 (former)
- K-194 (Kansas highway)
- Kentucky Route 194
- Maine State Route 194
- Maryland Route 194
- M-194 (Michigan highway) (former)
- Minnesota State Highway 194
- New York State Route 194 (former)
- North Carolina Highway 194
- Ohio State Route 194 (former)
- Oregon Route 194
- Pennsylvania Route 194
- South Carolina Highway 194
- Tennessee State Route 194
- Texas State Highway 194
  - Texas State Highway Spur 194
  - Farm to Market Road 194 (Texas)
- Utah State Route 194
- Virginia State Route 194
- Washington State Route 194 (former)
- Wisconsin Highway 194
- Wyoming Highway 194

Territories

- Puerto Rico Highway 194

== Great Britain ==
- A194 road in Tyne and Wear, England

Preceded by 193	Lists of highways 194	Succeeded by 195
