= List of highways numbered 190 =

Route 190, or Highway 190, may refer to:

== Canada ==
- Manitoba Highway 190
- New Brunswick Route 190

== Ireland ==
- R190 regional road

== Japan ==
- Japan National Route 190

== United Kingdom ==
- A190 road

== United States ==
- Various spurs designated Interstate 190:
  - Interstate 190 (Illinois)
  - Interstate 190 (Massachusetts)
  - Interstate 190 (New York)
  - Interstate 190 (South Dakota)
- U.S. Route 190
- Arkansas Highway 190
- California State Route 190
- Connecticut Route 190
- Florida State Road 190
- Georgia State Route 190
- Hawaii Route 190
- Illinois Route 190 (former)
- K-190 (Kansas highway)
- Kentucky Route 190
- Maine State Route 190
- Maryland Route 190
- Massachusetts Route 190 (former)
- Minnesota State Highway 190 (former)
- Missouri Route 190
- New Mexico State Road 190
- New York State Route 190
- Ohio State Route 190
- Pennsylvania Route 190 (former)
- Tennessee State Route 190
- Texas State Highway 190
  - Texas State Highway Spur 190
  - Farm to Market Road 190 (Texas)
- Utah State Route 190
- Virginia State Route 190
- Wisconsin Highway 190
- Wyoming Highway 190

Territories

- Puerto Rico Highway 190

Preceded by 189	Lists of highways 190	Succeeded by 191
