= List of highways numbered 195 =

The following highways are numbered 195:

== Canada ==
- Quebec Route 195

== India ==
- State Highway 195 (Maharashtra)

== Mexico ==
- Mexican Federal Highway 195

== Japan ==
- Japan National Route 195

== United Kingdom ==
- B195 road
- A195 road

== United States ==
- Various Interstate 195s:
  - Interstate 195 (Florida)
  - Interstate 195 (Maine)
  - Interstate 195 (Maryland)
  - Interstate 195 (New Jersey)
  - Interstate 195 (Rhode Island-Massachusetts)
  - Interstate 195 (Virginia)
- U.S. Route 195
- Alabama State Route 195
- Arizona State Route 195
- Arkansas Highway 195
- California State Route 195
- Connecticut Route 195
- Georgia State Route 195
- Iowa Highway 195 (former)
- K-195 (Kansas highway)
- Kentucky Route 195
- Maine State Route 195
- Maryland Route 195
- M-195 (Michigan highway) (former)
- New Mexico State Road 195
- New York State Route 195 (former)
- North Carolina Highway 195
- Ohio State Route 195
- Rhode Island Route 195 (former)
- Tennessee State Route 195
- Texas State Highway 195
  - Farm to Market Road 195 (Texas)
- Utah State Route 195 (former)
- Virginia State Route 195

=== Territories ===
- Puerto Rico Highway 195

Preceded by 194	Lists of highways 195	Succeeded by 196
