= Route 192 =

Route 192 may refer to:

In bus transportation:

- London Buses route 192, England
- Greater Manchester bus route 192, England
- Former West Midlands bus routes 192 and 194, England

In road transportation:

- List of highways numbered 192
