= List of highways numbered 193 =

The following highways are numbered 193:

== Ireland ==
- R193 regional road

== Japan ==
- Japan National Route 193

== United Kingdom ==
- A193 road
- B193 road

== United States ==
- Interstate 193 (former)
- U.S. Route 193 (unbuilt)
- Alabama State Route 193
- Arkansas Highway 193
- California State Route 193
- Connecticut Route 193
- Florida State Road 193 (former)
- Georgia State Route 193
- Iowa Highway 193 (former)
- K-193 (Kansas highway)
- Kentucky Route 193
- Maine State Route 193
- Maryland Route 193
- Massachusetts Route 193
- M-193 (Michigan highway) (former)
- New Mexico State Road 193
- New York State Route 193
- Ohio State Route 193
- Pennsylvania Route 193 (former)
- South Carolina Highway 193
- Tennessee State Route 193
- Texas State Highway 193
  - Texas State Highway Loop 193
  - Farm to Market Road 193 (Texas)
- Utah State Route 193
- Virginia State Route 193
- Washington State Route 193
- West Virginia Route 193
- Wisconsin Highway 193
- Wyoming Highway 193

Territories

- Puerto Rico Highway 193

Preceded by 192	Lists of highways 193	Succeeded by 194
