= Washington State Route 193 =

State highway in Whitman County, Washington, US

State Route 193
- Wawawai Road
- SR 193 highlighted in red

Route information
- Maintained by WSDOT
- Length: 2.58 mi (4.15 km)
- Existed: 1964–present

Major junctions
- South end: SR 128 near Clarkston
- North end: Wawawai Road near Clarkston

Location
- Country: United States
- State: Washington
- Counties: Whitman

Highway system
- State highways in Washington; Interstate; US; State; Scenic; Pre-1964; 1964 renumbering; Former
← I-182	→ SR 194

State Route 193 (SR 193) is a 2.58-mile (4.15 km) long state highway that serves the Port of Wilma in Whitman County, located in the U.S. state of Washington. The highway parallels the Snake River from an intersection with SR 128 north of Clarkston to the Port of Wilma. The current road is a short segment of the former route that extended from U.S. Route 12 (US 12) in Clarkston to US 195 west of Colton that was added to the highway system in 1969 as Secondary State Highway 3G (SSH 3G) in 1969 and removed in 1992.

== Route description ==
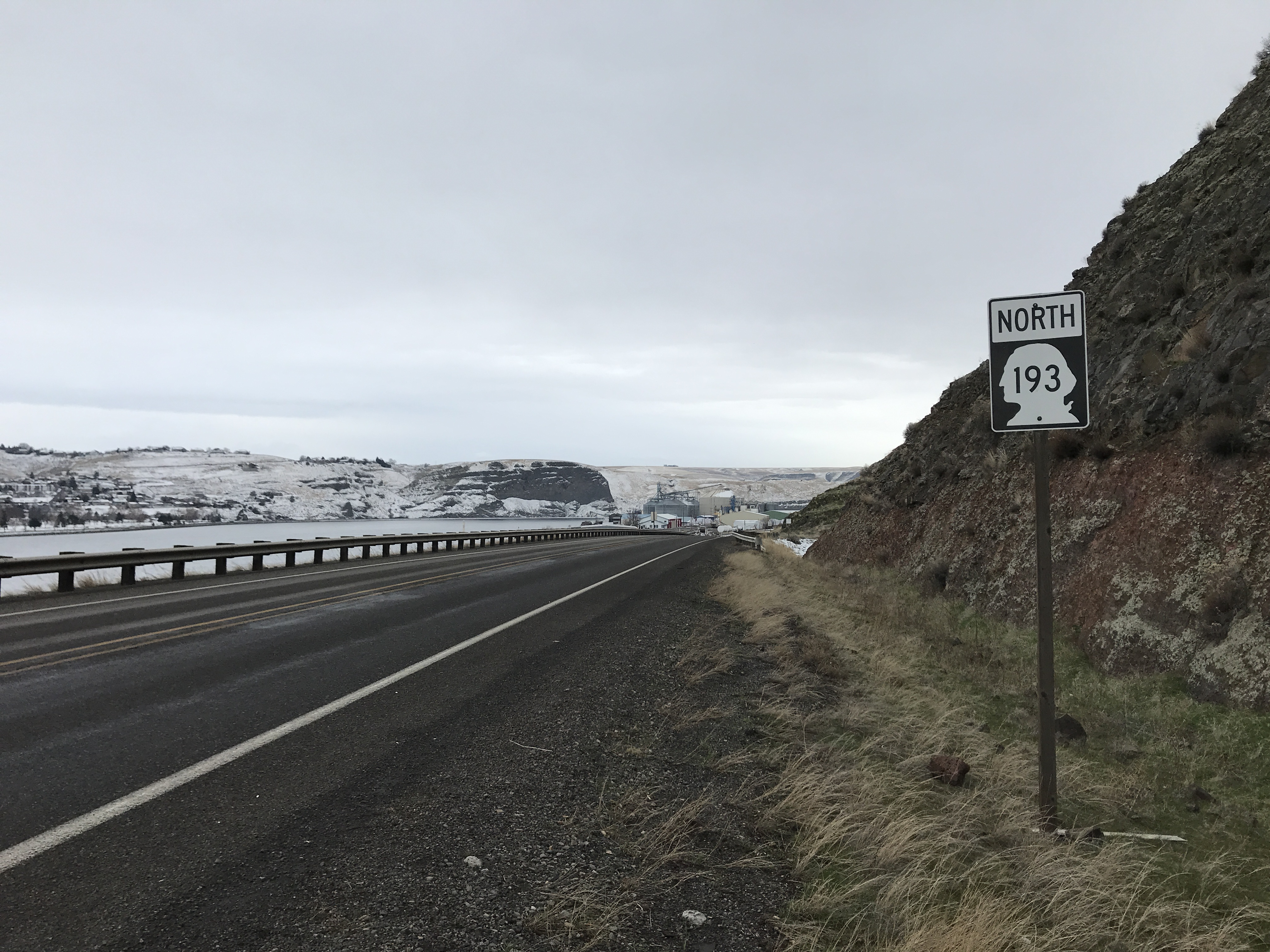
The eastern terminus of SR 193, facing westbound.

State Route 193 (SR 193) begins at an intersection with SR 128 north of the Red Wolf Crossing over the Snake River in Clarkston. SR 128 turns east towards Lewiston, Idaho and SR 193 travels west on the Wawawai Road parallel to the Snake River and the Great Northwest Railroad to the Port of Wilma, carrying a daily average of 1,600 vehicles in 2011. The highway ends at a private gravel road and the roadway continues downstream as the Wawawai Road to Wawawai County Park.

== History ==
The Wawawai area was a community for Chinese laborers working on nearby farms located on the Snake River, founded in 1875. The community was serviced by the Snake River Valley Railroad that connected Lewiston, Idaho to Washington state. The Wawawai Road was an unpaved dirt road by the 1960s, before the Port of Wilma was established and built. The highway from U.S. Route 410 (US 410) in Clarkston through Wawawai and to US 195 west of Colton was signed as Secondary State Highway 3G (SSH 3G) in 1969. SSH 3G became SR 193 during a highway renumbering and was signed in 1970.

Early plans to extend the highway to US 195 near Pullman in the 1970s were never acted on due to a lack of funds. The Red Wolf Crossing opened on October 19, 1979, providing a high-level crossing of the Snake River for SR 193 after the construction of the Lower Granite Dam. The highway was shortened to the current 2.58-mile (4.15 km) route in 1991 and the former route from US 410 (now US 12) in Clarkston to the Wawawai Road north of the Snake River became part of SR 128. Since 1991, no major revisions to the highway's route have occurred.

== Major intersections ==
The entire highway is in Whitman County.

Location	mi	km	Destinations	Notes
	0.00	0.00	SR 128 – Clarkston, Lewiston, ID	Southern terminus
	2.58	4.15	Wawawai Road	Northern terminus; continues as Wawawai Road
1.000 mi = 1.609 km; 1.000 km = 0.621 mi
