= List of highways numbered 191 =

The following highways are numbered 191:

== Canada ==
- New Brunswick Route 191
- Quebec Route 191

== Cuba ==
- Road to Peñalver (2–191)
- Road of Turiguanó (5-191)

== Japan ==
- Japan National Route 191

== Philippines ==
- N191 highway (Philippines)

== United Kingdom ==
- A191 road
- B191 road

== United States ==
- U.S. Route 191
- Alabama State Route 191
- Arkansas Highway 191
- California State Route 191
- Connecticut Route 191
- Florida State Road 191 (former)
- Georgia State Route 191
- Iowa Highway 191
- K-191 (Kansas highway)
- Kentucky Route 191
- Maine State Route 191
- Maryland Route 191
- M-191 (Michigan highway) (former)
- Montana Highway 191 (former)
- New York State Route 191
- North Carolina Highway 191
- Ohio State Route 191
- Pennsylvania Route 191
- South Carolina Highway 191
- Tennessee State Route 191
- Texas State Highway 191
  - Texas State Highway Spur 191
  - Farm to Market Road 191 (Texas)
- Utah State Route 191
- Vermont Route 191
- Virginia State Route 191
- Wisconsin Highway 191
- Wyoming Highway 191

Territories

- Forest Highway 191 (Puerto Rico)

Preceded by 190	Lists of highways 191	Succeeded by 192
