= List of highways numbered 196 =

The following highways are numbered 196:

== Ireland ==
- R196

== Japan ==
- Japan National Route 196

== United Kingdom ==
- A196 road
- B196 road

== United States ==
- Interstate 196
- Alabama State Route 196
- Arkansas Highway 196
- California State Route 196 (former)
- Colorado State Highway 196
- Connecticut Route 196
- Florida State Road 196
- Georgia State Route 196
- Iowa Highway 196
- K-196 (Kansas highway)
- Kentucky Route 196
- Maine State Route 196
- M-196 (Michigan highway) (former)
- New Mexico State Road 196
- New York State Route 196
- Ohio State Route 196
- Pennsylvania Route 196
- Tennessee State Route 196
- Texas State Highway 196 (former)
  - Texas State Highway Spur 196
  - Farm to Market Road 196 (Texas)
- Utah State Route 196
- Virginia State Route 196
- Wyoming Highway 196

Territories:

- Puerto Rico Highway 196

Preceded by 195	Lists of highways 196	Succeeded by 197
