= Barchetta =

Italian type of small boat

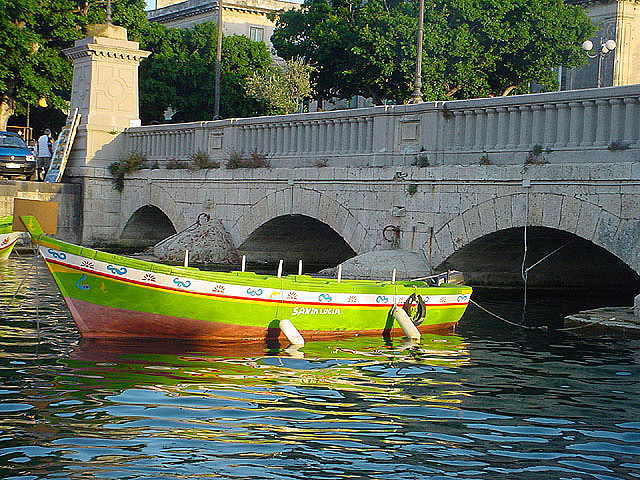
Barchetta near the Ponte Umbertino

Barchetta (Italian pronunciation: [barˈketta]) is an Italian word commonly translated into English as "little boat". The term originally referred to a small skiff used for recreational purposes. It is also applied to some items of clothing, as well as being used in automobile styling, where it describes a class of open-top, two-seat sports cars.

== Etymology ==
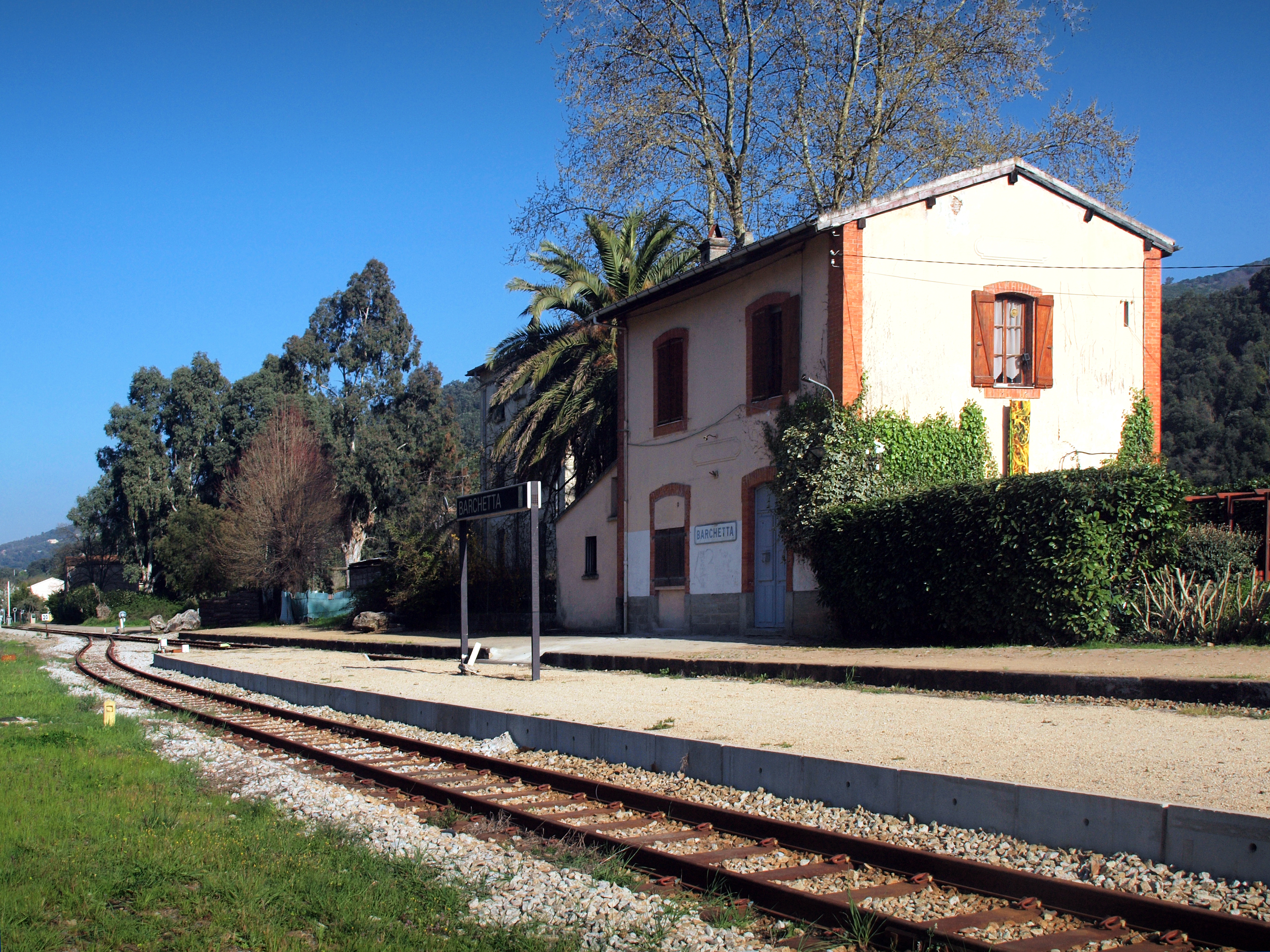
Barchetta Station, Volpajola

=== Italian ===
The root of barchetta is barca, the Italian word for "boat". In Italian "small boat" would be piccola barca.

The use of the diminutive suffix -etta, the feminine form of -etto, confers the sense of something small or tiny with a connotation of endearment or affection towards the object.

The plural form of barchetta is barchette.

=== French ===
In French the equivalent term is barquette. The root word barque, which in French refers to a boat with three or more masts, is combined with the diminutive suffix -ette. In common use, barquette may refer to a shallow container or tray. Its use when describing an automobile is similar to that of the Italian term.

== Clothing ==
A cappello a barchetta refers to a military side cap similar to a bustina. It may also refer to an outmoded three-cornered hat somewhat similar to a tricorne with a less pronounced brim.

A tasca a barchetta or "barchetta pocket" refers to a breast pocket in a men's suit jacket or blazer cut and trimmed in the curved shape of a boat.

== Automobiles ==
=== Description ===
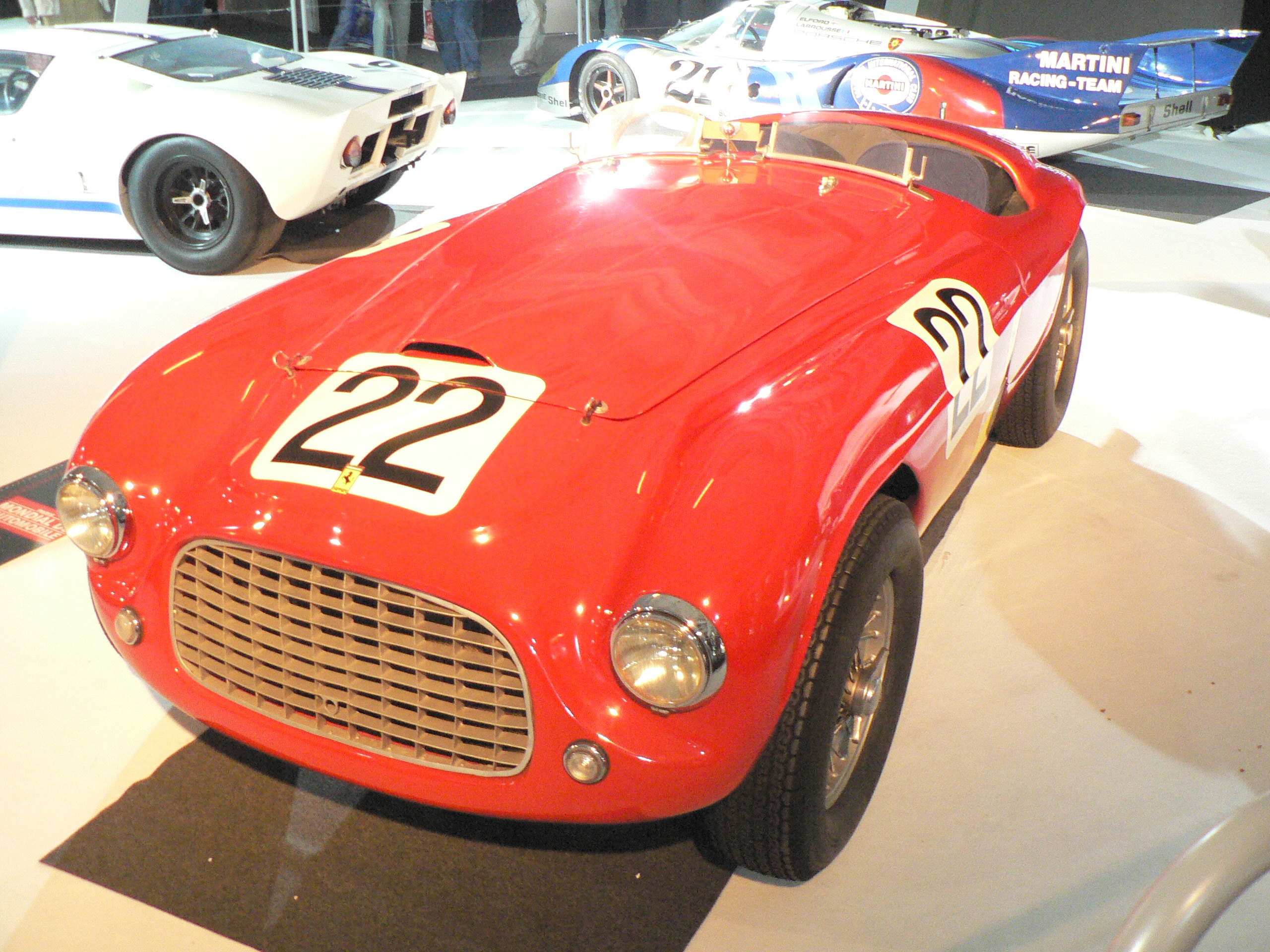
1949 Ferrari 166 MM barchetta

When applied to an automobile, barchetta describes a small car that is open-topped, without provision of a removable or foldable top for weather protection. Instead of a full windshield, the barchetta has a low-rise transparent wind deflector that may be a single full-width piece, be divided into two sections, or omitted entirely. With an emphasis on performance, unnecessary trim and equipment is kept to a minimum.

The barchetta has full-width enveloping bodywork, in contrast to an early spider corsa, which may have cycle or wing fenders. Later (non-corsa) spiders added more heavily padded seats, interior carpeting and a full windshield, items not found in the more spartan barchette. Some later cars still called barchette were more well appointed, following the trend of the later spiders and convertibles.

=== Origins and use ===
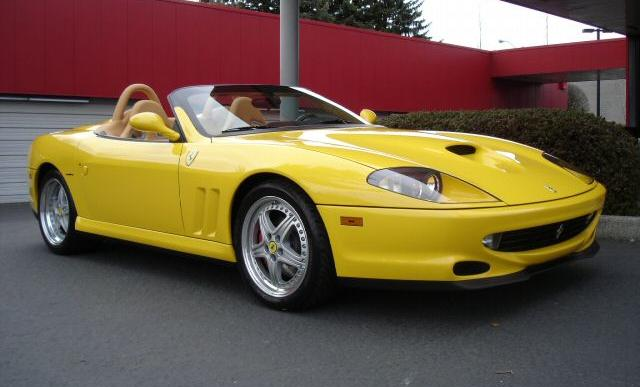
Ferrari 550 Barchetta Pininfarina

The first car to be called a barchetta was a Ferrari 166 MM shown at the 1948 Turin Auto Show. The car was designed by Federico Formenti at Carrozzeria Touring. Giovanni Canestrini, editor of the Italian sporting newspaper La Gazzetta dello Sport, applied the term to describe the new car's original bodystyle. The name barchetta has been associated with the open 166 MM model ever since.

Ferrari built other models also called barchetta, including versions of the Ferrari 212 Inter and the Ferrari 250 MM Vignale.

Other manufacturers began to use the name as well, such as the Maserati brothers' O.S.C.A. MT4 barchetta of 1948, the 1953 Moretti 750 barchetta, and the 1966 Abarth 1000 SP racing barchetta.

The label was also applied retroactively to cars that had been built before the launch of the Ferrari 166MM, such as the 1943 Stanguellini Ala d'Oro.

More contemporary barchette have included the 1991 track-oriented Maserati Barchetta, the Fiat Barchetta of 1995–2005, Ferrari's 2001 550 Barchetta Pininfarina built to mark Pininfarina's 70th anniversary, the 2003 Lamborghini Murciélago Barchetta Concept, that entered production under Roadster nameplate; the 2001 Aston Martin DB4 GT Zagato Barchetta recreation, the 2007 Bertone Barchetta Concept the 2018 Pagani Zonda HP Barchetta and the 2024 Morgan Midsummer.
