= List of highways numbered 197 =

The following highways are numbered 197:

== Canada ==
- Quebec Route 197

== Japan ==
- Japan National Route 197

== United Kingdom ==
- A197 road
- B197 road

== United States ==
- U.S. Route 197
- Alabama State Route 197
- Arkansas Highway 197
- California State Route 197
- Connecticut Route 197
- Florida State Road 197 (former)
- Georgia State Route 197
- Hawaii Route 197
- K-197 (Kansas highway)
- Kentucky Route 197
- Maine State Route 197
- Maryland Route 197
- Massachusetts Route 197
- Minnesota State Highway 197
- New Mexico State Road 197
- New York State Route 197
- North Carolina Highway 197
- Ohio State Route 197
- Tennessee State Route 197
- Texas State Highway 197 (former)
  - Texas State Highway Loop 197 (former)
  - Texas State Highway Spur 197
  - Farm to Market Road 197 (Texas)
- Utah State Route 197
- Virginia State Route 197
- Wyoming Highway 197

Preceded by 196	Lists of highways 197	Succeeded by 198
