= 195th =

195th may refer to:

- 195th (2/1st Scottish Rifles) Brigade, a Territorial Force division of the British Army during the First World War
- 195th (Airlanding) Field Ambulance, Royal Army Medical Corps unit of the British airborne forces during the Second World War
- 195th (City of Regina) Battalion, CEF, unit in the Canadian Expeditionary Force during the First World War
- 195th Fighter Squadron, unit of the Arizona Air National Guard 162d Fighter Wing located at Tucson Air National Guard Base, Arizona
- 195th Ohio Infantry (or 195th OVI), infantry regiment in the Union Army during the American Civil War
- 195th Street (Manhattan)
- Pennsylvania's 195th Representative District

== See also ==
- 195
- 195 (number)
- 195 AD
- 195 BC
