= Washington State Route 194 =

State highway in Whitman County, Washington, US

State Route 194

- SR 194 highlighted in red

Route information
- Auxiliary route of US 195
- Maintained by WSDOT
- Length: 21.01 mi (33.81 km)
- Existed: 1991–present
- Tourist routes: Palouse Scenic Byway

Major junctions
- West end: Almota Road in Almota
- East end: US 195 near Pullman

Location
- Country: United States
- State: Washington
- Counties: Whitman

Highway system
- State highways in Washington; Interstate; US; State; Scenic; Pre-1964; 1964 renumbering; Former
← SR 193	→ US 195

State Route 194 (SR 194) is a 21.01-mile (33.81 km) long state highway that serves the Lower Granite Dam in Whitman County, located in the U.S. state of Washington. The highway extends eastward from the Port of Almota on the Snake River to an intersection with U.S. Route 195 (US 195) west of Pullman. SR 194 was established in 1991, although the roadway has appeared on maps as early as 1933 and the Almota area being home to a ferry as early as 1893.

== Route description ==
State Route 194 (SR 194) begins at an intersection with Almota Docks Road, connecting to a grain elevator, and Lower Granite Road, connecting to the Lower Granite Dam. The highway travels north under a rail line owned by Great Northwest Railroad and climbs a hill before turning south in a hairpin turn and turning northeast along a ridge. The road turns southeast and follows Goose Creek through farmland, spanning it four times before intersecting the Wawawai-Pullman Road. SR 194 becomes the Wawawai Road and continues northeast to end at an intersection with U.S. Route 195 (US 195). The eastern terminus of the highway at US 195 is the busiest part of the roadway, being used by a daily average of 740 people in 2011.

== History ==
The Almota area was a port on the Snake River with a ferry and was home to Chinese laborers working on nearby farmland. The ferry Annie Faxon exploded traveling downstream from Almota to Riparia on August 14, 1893, killing eight people because of a faulty boiler. State Route 194 (SR 194) was added to the state highway system in 1991, but early portions of a road connecting Pullman to a ferry at Almota on the Snake River have appeared on maps since 1933 as a gravel or dirt path. The Port of Whitman County was established in 1958 and began developing facilities in Almota after the completion of the Lower Granite Dam in 1965. Shortly after the establishment of the Port of Almota, the roadway was reconstructed, beginning with an improved Wawawai-Pullman Road by 1963. SR 194 was established and written into law as a route from the Port of Almota to U.S. Route 195 (US 195) west of Pullman in 1991. Since 1991, no major revisions to the highway's route have occurred.

== Major intersections ==
The entire highway is in Whitman County.

Location	mi	km	Destinations	Notes
	0.00	0.00	Almota Road	Western terminus; continues as Almota Road
	21.01	33.81	US 195 – Spokane, Lewiston, ID	Eastern terminus; continues as Old Wawawai Road
1.000 mi = 1.609 km; 1.000 km = 0.621 mi
