= Carrozzeria Ala d'Oro =

- Industry: Automotive
- Founded: 1947
- Defunct: 1949
- Services: coachbuilding

Carrozzeria Ala d'Oro was a short-lived Italian manufacturer of automobile bodies, which became known after the end of the Second World War primarily for bodies for sports cars. The company was closely linked to the aircraft manufacturer Officine Meccaniche Reggiane (OMR).

== History ==
Carrozzeria Ala d'Oro was founded in 1947. It had its origins in the aircraft manufacturer Reggiane, founded in 1901, which had built successful combat aircraft before and during World War II. After Italy's defeat in 1943, Reggiane was banned from operating in the aviation sector by the victorious powers. In order to retain the expertise and skilled personnel from aircraft construction, Reggiane founded a company for the production of automobile bodies in 1947 on the initiative of the pilot and racing driver Franco Bertani, which was called Ala d'Oro (English: golden wing). The name was intended to allude to the company's origins in aircraft construction.

The Carrozzeria Ala d'Oro was housed in Reggiane's workshops in Reggio nell'Emilia. Bertani acted as owner. Numerous employees were taken on by Reggiane, among them the engineer Aurelio Lampredi and craftsmen who had special skills in the processing of aluminum sheets.

Ala d'Oro was only active for three years. At the end of the decade, the parent company Reggiane switched to building railway carriages. This area completely replaced aircraft production and was increasingly successful. In order to meet the personnel requirements, Reggiane gradually brought back the craftsmen from Ala d'Oro, so that Ala d'Oro had to stop building coachwork in 1949.

The name Carrozzeria Ala d'Oro has been used by a repair shop in Turin since 1973. There are no connections to Franco Bertani's company.

== Vehicles with Ala d'Oro bodies ==
=== Commercial vehicles ===
One of Ala d'Oro's main activities was the dismantling and conversion of military vehicles into civilian or commercial vehicles. This was a widespread business model in Italy in the immediate post-war period.

=== Sports cars ===
In addition to the (re)construction of commercial vehicles, Franco Bertani's company also built sports car bodies, although this only made up a small part of the production volume. Typical of the Ala d'Oro bodies were smooth car sides in the pontoon style and a sloping profile at the front and rear, reminiscent of an airplane wing. Ala d'Oro's bodies were considered aerodynamically advanced.

==== Stanguellini ====
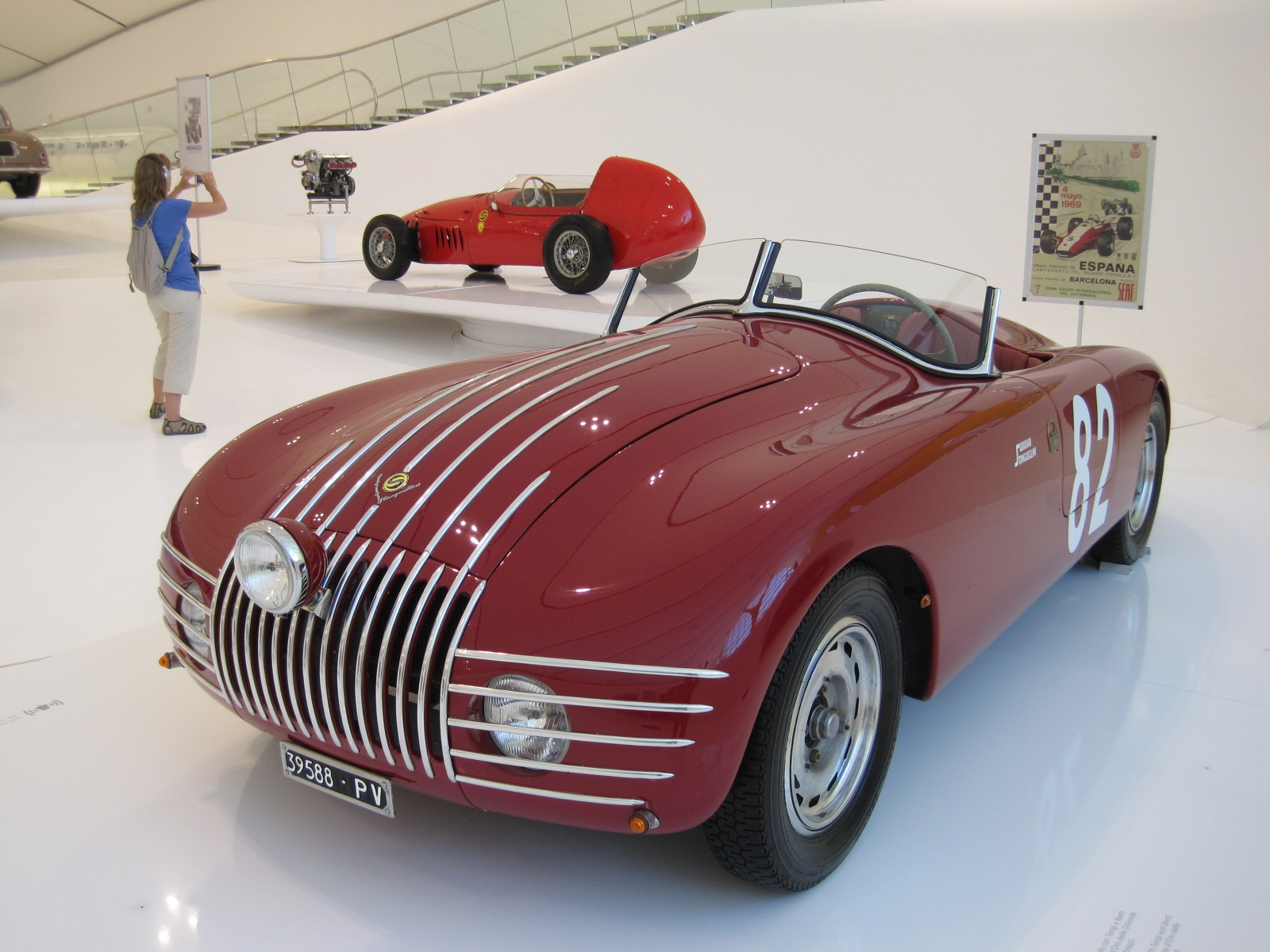
Stanguellini 1100 Sport Barchetta (1947)

Immediately after the start of operations, Franco Bertani made contact with the racing car manufacturer Stanguellini, for whose factory team he had competed in numerous races in the pre-war period. In 1947, Stanguellini launched the 1100 Sport, whose drivetrain and chassis technology was derived from the contemporary Fiat 1100. In the following years, the 1100 Sport models received bodies primarily from Bertone, Pininfarina and Motto, but at least two cars were also bodied by Ala d'Oro:

- A chassis received a Barchetta body with smooth flanks, vertical and horizontal chrome struts on the front section and a third headlight located in the middle of the car.
- The 1100 Sport Berlinetta has the same bodywork, but a fixed roof with a four-part rear window.

==== Maserati ====
In 1947, Ala d'Oro fitted one of the first chassis of Maserati's A6GCS series (chassis number 2003) with a closed Berlinetta body on a factory order. The body was designed as a hatchback coupé with smooth sides. The wide, fully covered B-pillar continued seamlessly into the rear fenders. The A-pillar was exceptionally steep; the windshield was divided in two by a central bar. The doors were small, as were the side windows. The headlights were set into the front mask.

Maserati's factory team took part in the Mille Miglia in May 1947 with this car and the drivers Luigi Villoresi and Guerino Bertocchi (starting number 222). The not yet fully developed car retired before the end of the race.

After this race, the chassis received a new, open body, commissioned by a private customer. The Ala d'Oro body was destroyed in 1949.

==== Ermini ====
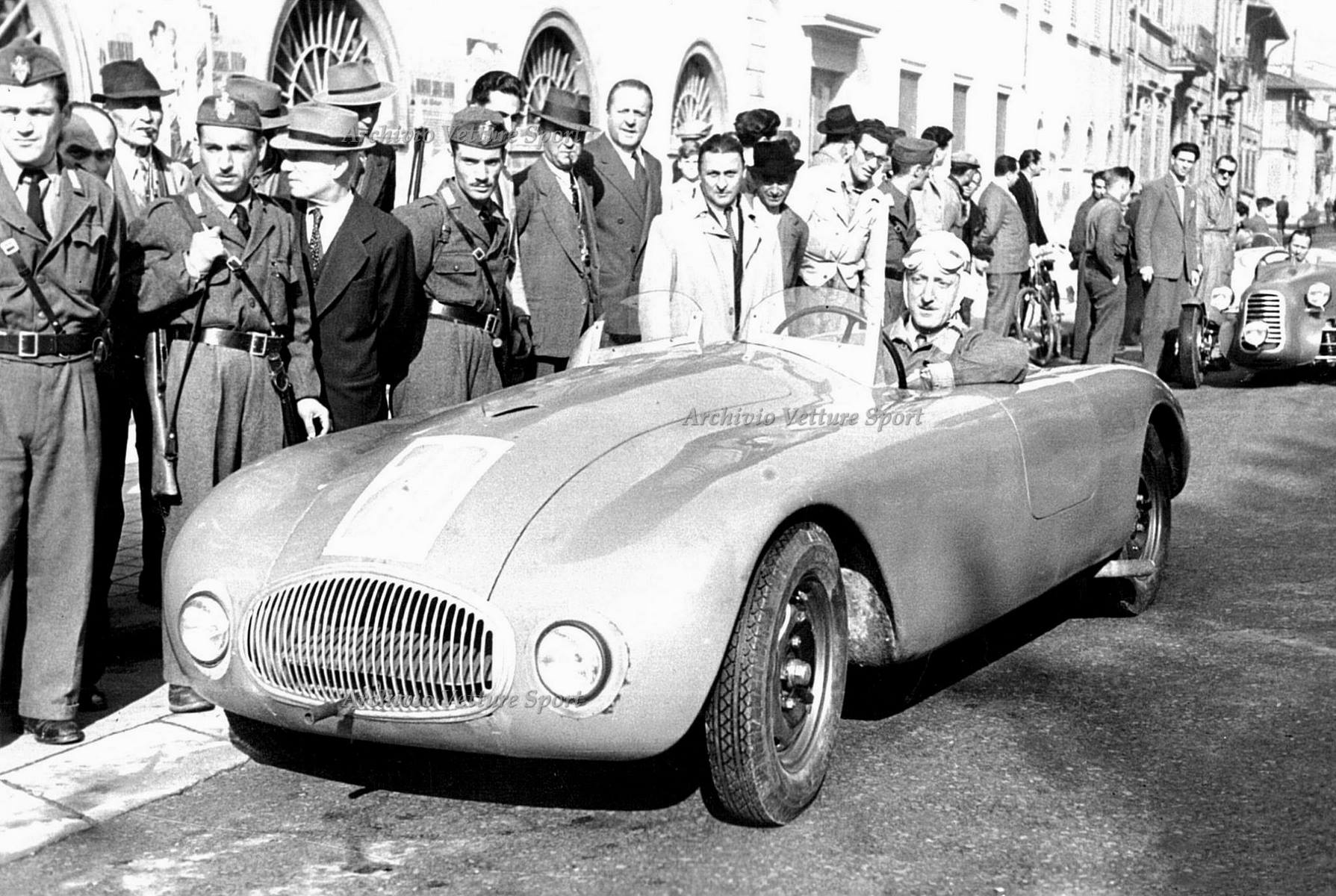
Ermini Fiat 1100 bodied by Ala d'Oro

In 1948, Ala d'Oro built a Barchetta for the Florentine racing car manufacturer Ermini, which was based on a Fiat 1100 chassis and had a Fiat engine reworked by Ermini. The car, with the chassis number 214184, had a flat pontoon-style body with a horizontal beltline and rounded front and rear sections. As was usual with Ala d'Oro, the headlights were set far down in the front mask. The cooling air opening was oval in shape and had a grille. Pasquale Ermini started with the car in the 1948 Mille Miglia. He did not finish; the car was badly damaged in an accident. Ermini sold the accident-damaged car to Camillo Rossi, who commissioned Carrozzeria Mariani to repair the body. Mariani designed a new front end with a square cooling air intake and a bulge above the rear wheels that interrupted the otherwise horizontal belt line. Rossi took part in the first edition of the Coppa della Toscana in 1949 with this car. The car exists today and still has the Mariani body.

==== Fiat ====
Ala d'Oro also built a racing car that was to be used by the factory under its own name. The car had a chassis from the Fiat 500 and a tuned engine from the Fiat 1100. However, it was not a sporting success. Ala d'Oro then sold the body design to other small racing car manufacturers such as Giannini, who partly prepared their cars with these bodies for use in the 750 cc class.

== Literature ==
- Alessandro Sannia: Enciclopedia dei carrozzieri italiani. Società Editrice Il Cammello, 2017, ISBN 978-88-96796-41-2.
