= Officine Ermini Firenze =

Italian sports car manufacturer

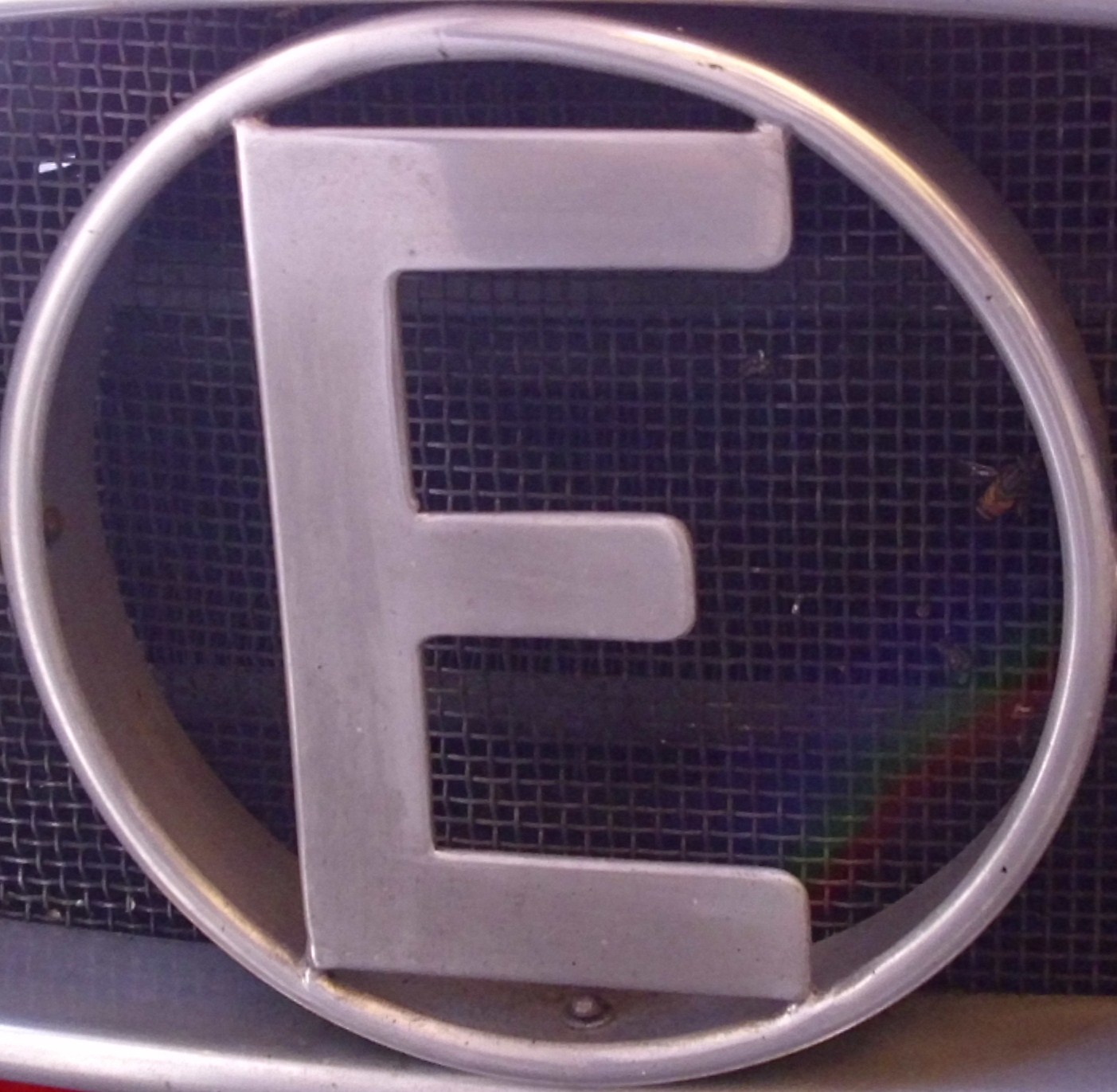

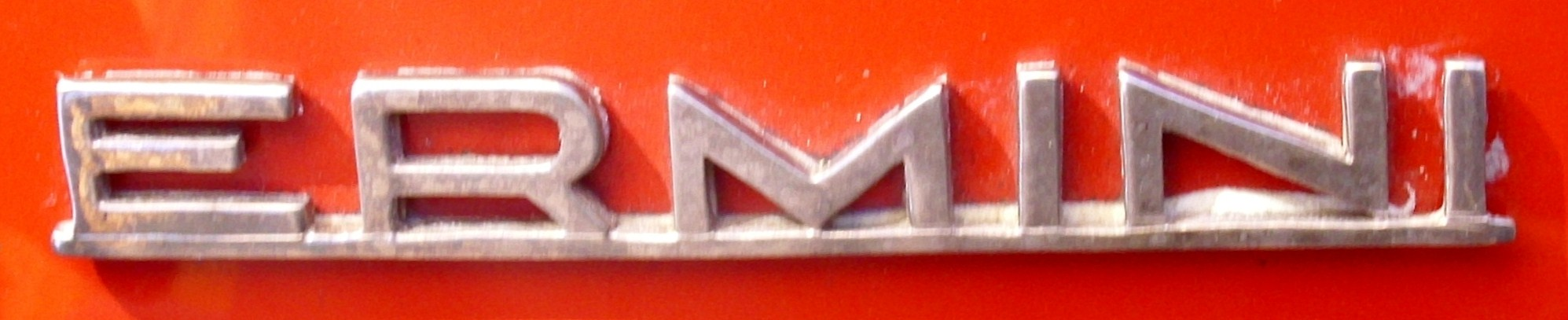
- Industry: Automotive
- Founded: 1932
- Founder: Pasquale Ermini
- Defunct: 1956
- Headquarters: Florence
- Website: http://www.erminiautomobili.it/

Officine Ermini Firenze was an Italian sports car manufacturer based in Florence.

== History ==
The company was founded by Pasquale Ermini in 1932, opening its first workshop in Via Campo D'Arrigo, Florence, preparing sports cars for local drivers.

In 1946, Pasquale Ermini developed his first car based on the Alfa Romeo 2500SS and with it, managed to win the title of Italian vice-champion in the Sport Maggiore category. Also in 1946 he designed and built his first twin-cam head, to be applied to the Fiat 1100 base.

In 1947 he founded the Scuderia TESS (Testa Emisfera Super Sport) with which he achieved seventh place overall at the Mille Miglia of the same year.

Due to the founder's health conditions, Ermini ceased production in 1956, but continued to provide assistance to its drivers until 1962, the year in which the last workshop in Viale Matteotti finally closed.

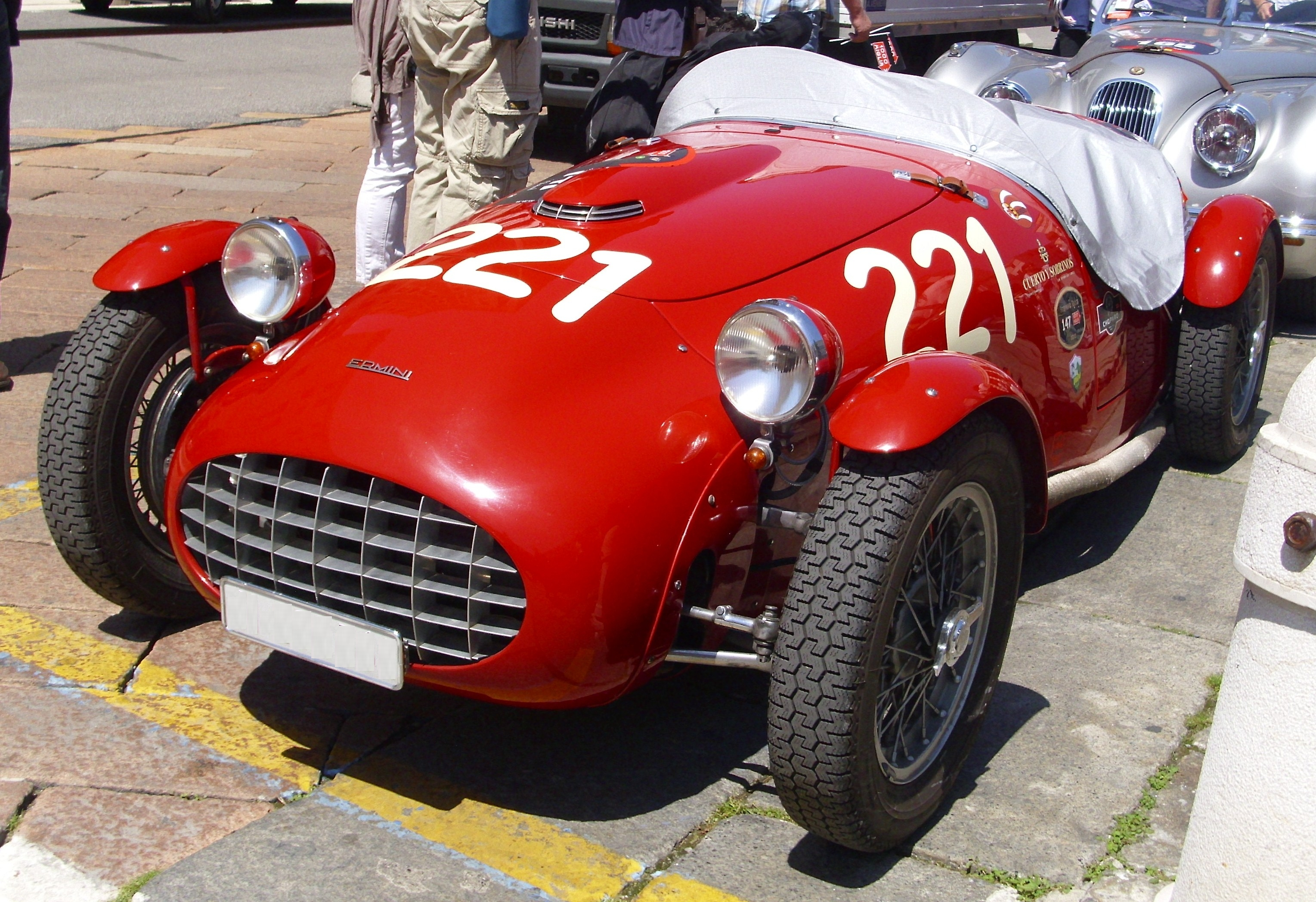
1951 Fiat Ermini Siluro 1100

== Vehicles ==
The first model had a tubular frame chassis. The drive was provided by a four-cylinder engine with DOHC valve control and two downdraft carburettors. A five-speed gearbox was used. The Gran Sport Coupé model was later presented at the Turin Motor Show. The drive was provided by a four-cylinder engine from Fiat, which had been enlarged to 1350 cc displacement. This engine produced 90 hp with DOHC valve control, dual ignition and Weber carburettor. The body was made by Pietro Frua. In 1956 the 1100 model, an open two-seater, followed.

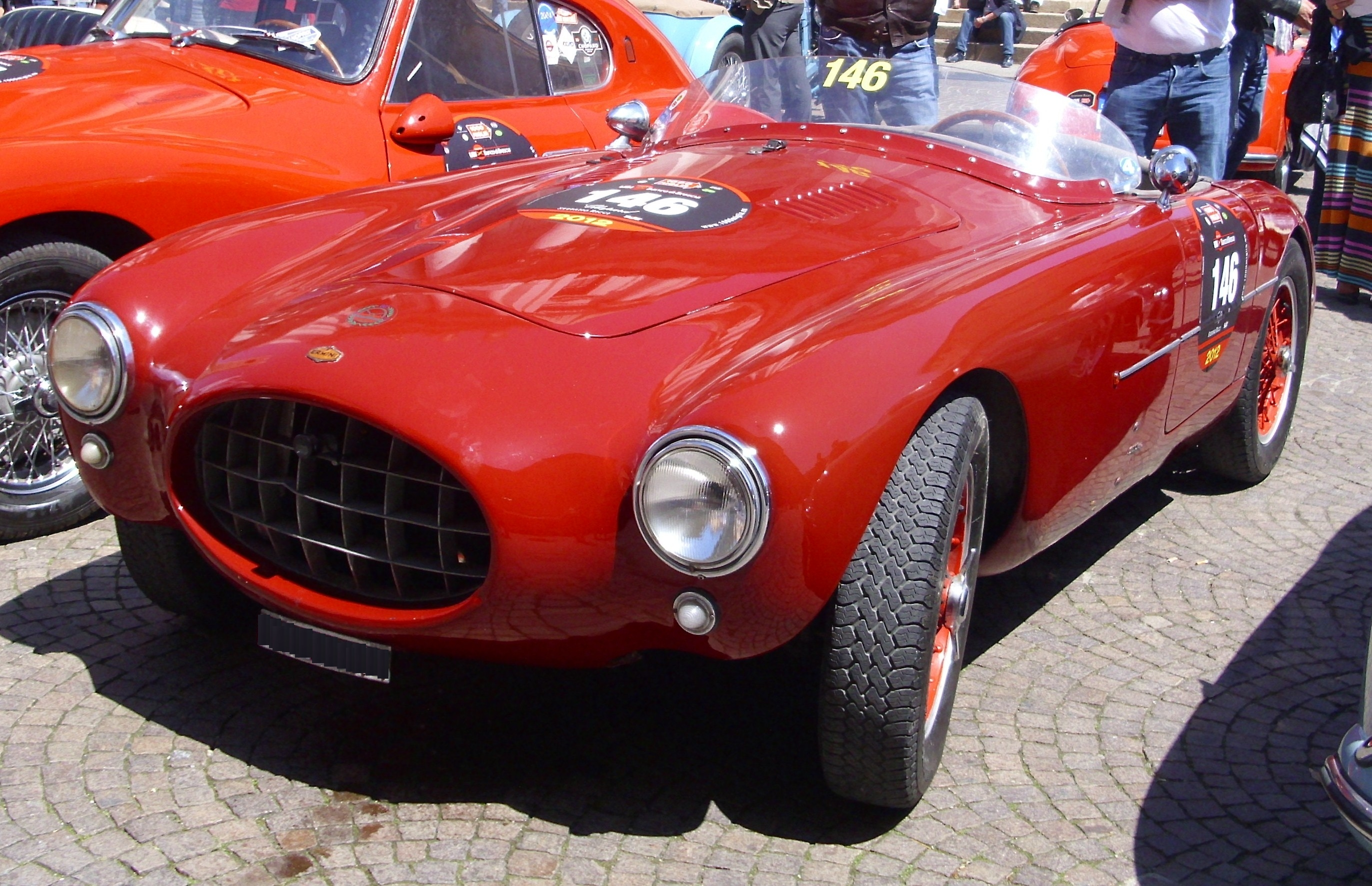
1952 Ermini 1100 Sport

== Production ==
Between 1946 and 1955, Ermini built nineteen cars plus a chassis:

- 1 Ermini-Alfa Romeo 2500cc (1947)
- 1 Ermini-Fiat Type Golden Wing 1100cc (1947)
- 2 Ermini-Fiat Grand Prix 1100cc (1948)
- 5 Ermini-Fiat Silver 1100cc (1949-1951)
- 1 Ermini-Fiat Berlinetta 1100cc (1950)
- 3 Ermini Sport International 1100cc (1951-1953)
- 1 Ermini Gran Turismo 1390cc (1953)
- 4 Ermini 357 Sport 1100cc (1954-1955)
- 1 Ermini 357 Sport 1500cc (1955)
- 1 Ermini chassis 1390cc (1955)

== Racing successes ==
Ermini won the 1950 National Sports Car Championship in the class up to 1100 cc displacement. Aldo Terigi finished fourth overall in the 1952 Targa Florio. Piero Scotti won his class at a Targa Florio.

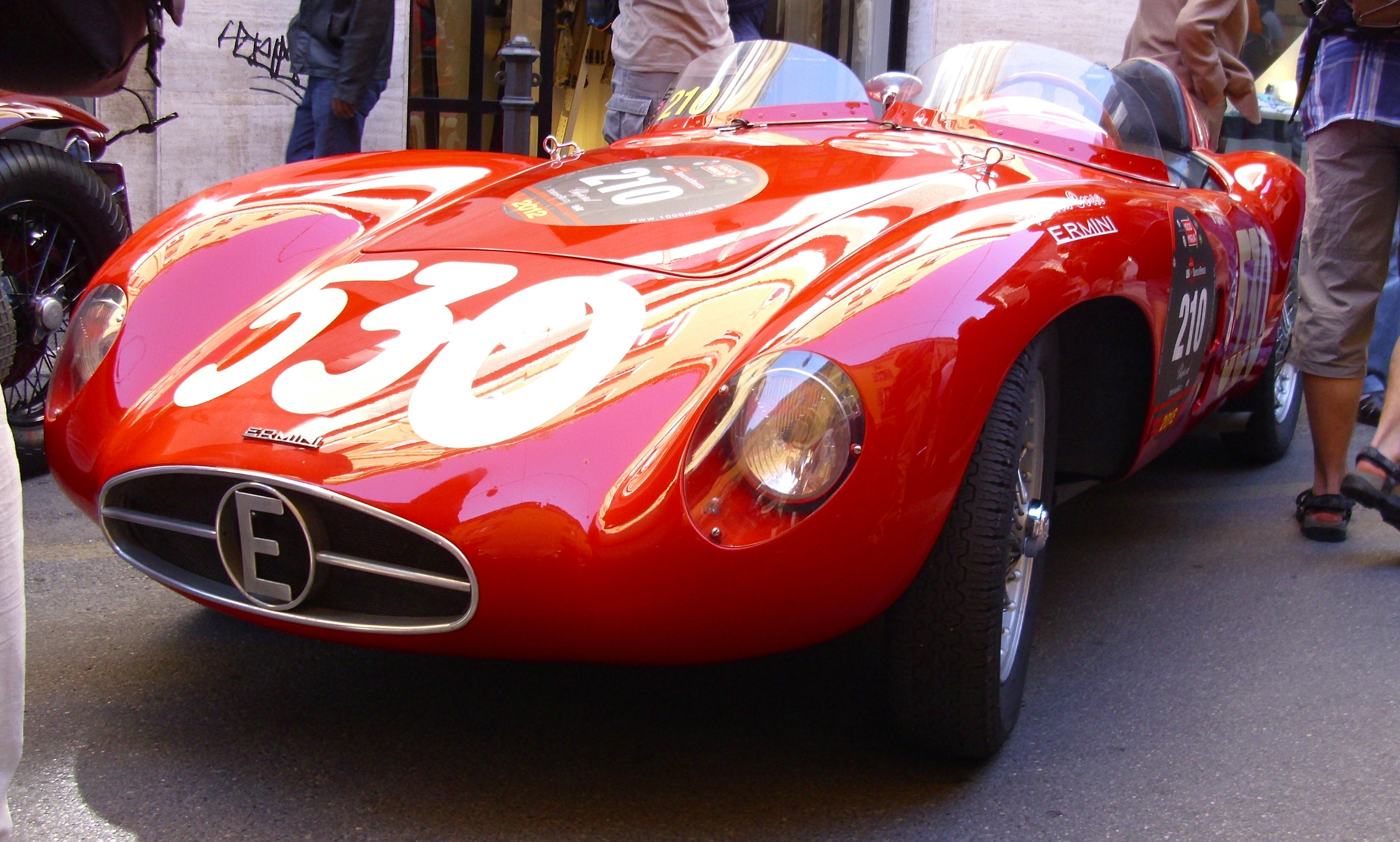
1955 Ermini Tipo 357

== The rebirth of the brand ==
The brand was reborn in 2007. In 2014 the Ermini Seiottosei was presented. The chassis was developed by Osella on the basis of its sports prototypes, with bodywork design by Giulio Cappellini and equipped with a 320-horsepower Renault engine, with an estimated production of 9 units.

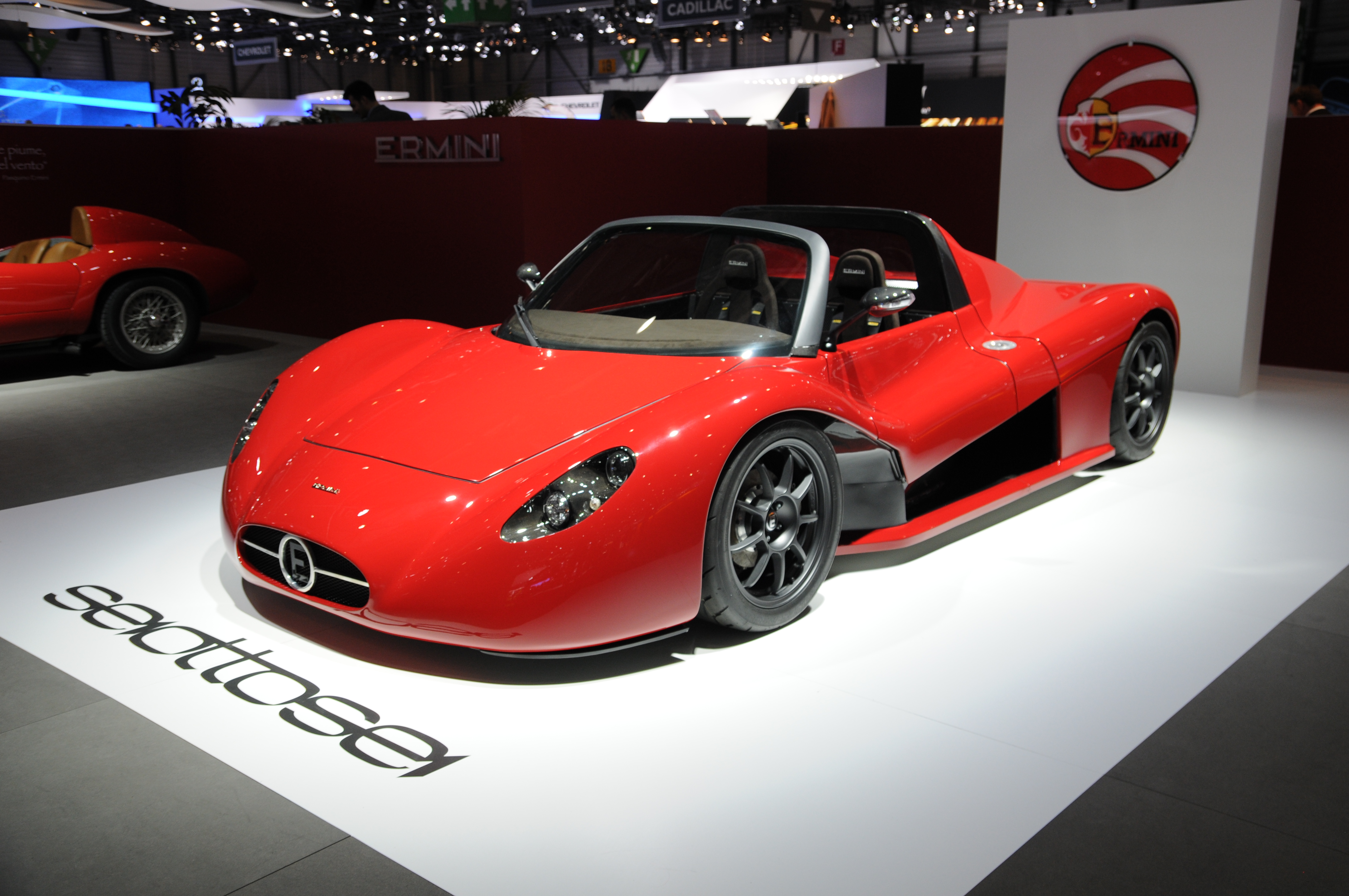
2014 Ermini Seiottosei
