= List of highways numbered 192 =

The following highways are numbered 192:

== Japan ==
- Japan National Route 192

== United Kingdom ==
- A192 road
- B192 road

== United States ==
- U.S. Route 192
- Alabama State Route 192
- California State Route 192
- Connecticut Route 192
- Georgia State Route 192
- Illinois Route 192
- Iowa Highway 192
- K-192 (Kansas highway)
- Kentucky Route 192
- Maine State Route 192
- Maryland Route 192
- Massachusetts Route 192
- New Mexico State Road 192
- New York State Route 192 (former)
- North Carolina Highway 192 (former)
- Ohio State Route 192 (former)
- Pennsylvania Route 192
- Tennessee State Route 192
- Texas State Highway 192 (former)
  - Texas State Highway Spur 192
  - Farm to Market Road 192 (Texas)
- Utah State Route 192 (former)
- Virginia State Route 192
- Wisconsin Highway 192 (former)
- Wyoming Highway 192

Territories

- Puerto Rico Highway 192

Preceded by 191	Lists of highways 192	Succeeded by 193
