= Ferrari 212 Inter =

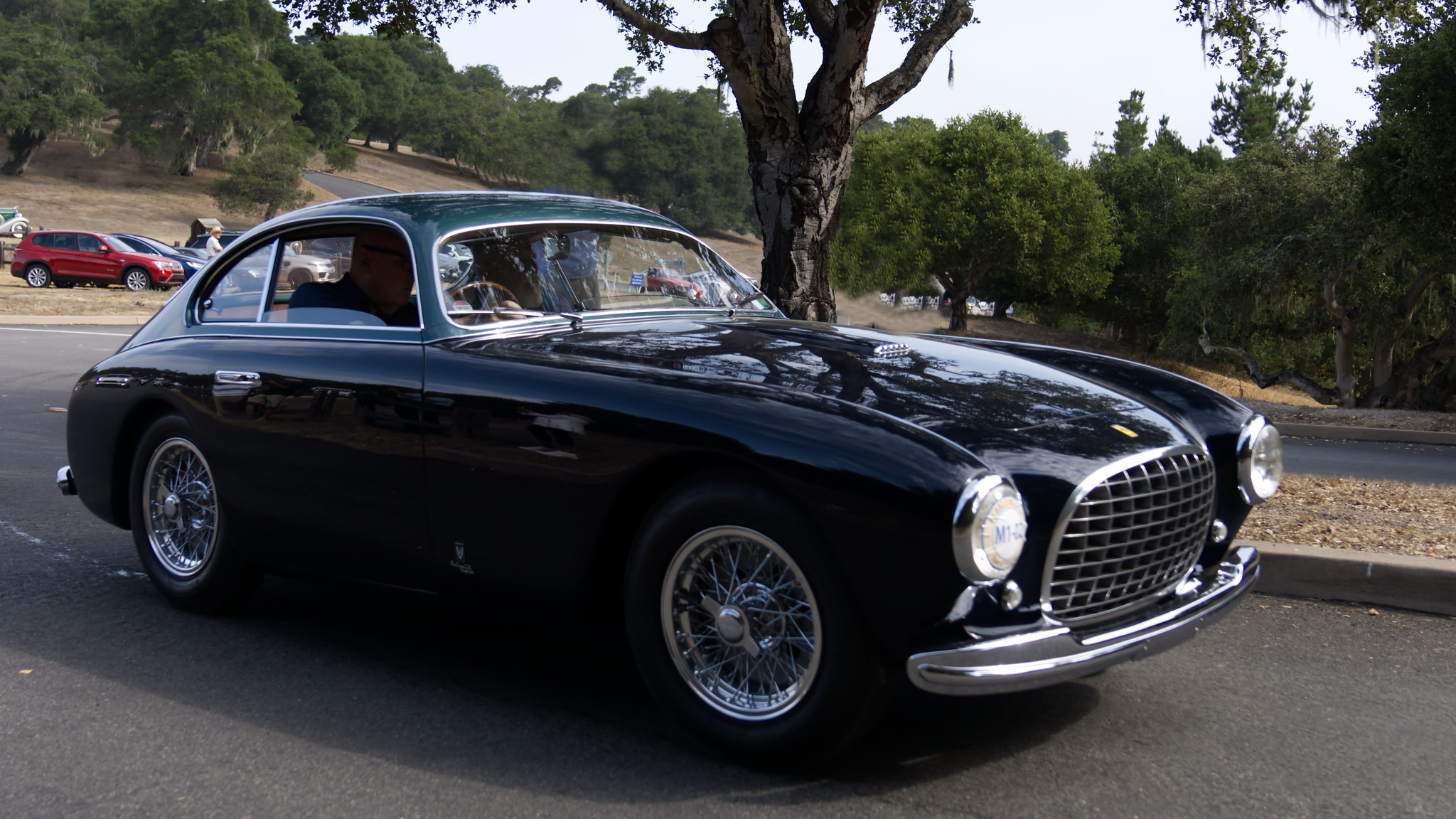
- Ferrari 212 Inter Vignale Coupé

Overview
- Manufacturer: Ferrari
- Also called: Ferrari 212 Europa
- Production: 1951–1952; 79 produced
- Designer: Vignale; Pinin Farina; Ghia; Touring

Body and chassis
- Class: Sports car
- Layout: FR layout

Powertrain
- Engine: 2.6 L (2562.51 cc) Colombo V12
- Transmission: 5-speed manual

Dimensions
- Wheelbase: 2,600 mm (102 in)
- Curb weight: 1,000 kg (2,205 lb) (coupé)

Chronology
- Predecessor: Ferrari 195 Inter
- Successor: Ferrari 250 Europa

See also the 212 Export sports racer

The Ferrari 212 Inter replaced Ferrari's successful 166 and 195 Inter grand tourers in 1951. Unveiled at the Brussels Motor Show that year, the 212 was an evolution of the 166 — a sports car for the road that could also win international races. In 1951, two 212 Inters, both Vignale coupés, driven by Taruffi/Chinetti and Ascari/Villoresi, scored 1–2 victory at Carrera Panamericana in Mexico.

The chassis was similar to the 125 with a suspension featuring double wishbones in front and live axle in back. Coachbuilders included Carrozzeria Touring, Ghia, Ghia-Aigle, Vignale, Stabilimenti Farina, and now Pinin Farina. The latter was an important move for the company, as Farina was already well-known and adding his styling skills would be a tremendous boost for Maranello. However, Pinin Farina was as prideful as Enzo Ferrari, and neither would go to the other to request business up to this point. A mutual meeting halfway between Maranello and Turin was the negotiated solution. The first Ferrari to be bodied by Pinin Farina was a 212 Inter Cabriolet, chassis no. 0177E.

The Inter's 2,600 mm (102.4 in) wheelbase was 4" longer than the 2,500 mm (98.4 in) Export's. The cars shared a larger, bored-out (68 mm) 2.6 L (2563 cc/156 in³) version of Ferrari's Colombo V12 engine. Output was 150 PS (110 kW; 148 hp) for the single Weber 36DCF carburetor Inter, 165 PS (121 kW; 163 hp) for the triple Weber Export. Improved cylinder heads raised power 5 PS (4 kW) in 1952.

The British magazine Autocar got hold of what they described as the first production model Ferrari 212 in 1950, which outperformed any car that they had previously tested. It recorded a top speed of over 116 mph (187 km/h) and acceleration times of 0 to 60 mph (97 km/h) of 10.5 seconds and 100 mph (161 km/h) in 22.5 seconds; the magazine however noted they had limited the engine to 6,500 rpm out of respect for the newness and low mileage of the car they were using, which suggested that even better performance would be available from a fully "run in" model. The test appears also to have been the Autocar team's first encounter with a five speed gear box.

== Body styles ==
The 212 Inter was produced in a number of different body styles depending on the coachbuilder. This includes:

- Vignale - 37 produced of all variants
  - Vignale Berlinetta - 5 produced
  - Vignale Cabriolet - 5 produced
  - Vignale Coupé - 26 produced
  - Vignale Spyder - 1 produced
- Pinin Farina - 17 produced of all variants
  - Pinin Farina Cabriolet - 2
  - Pinin Farina Coupé - 15
- Ghia - 15 produced of all variants
  - Ghia Cabriolet - 1 produced
  - Ghia Coupé - 10 produced
  - Ghia Coupé 2+2 - 4 produced
- Touring - 6 produced of all variants
  - Touring Barchetta - 1 produced
  - Touring Berlinetta - 5 produced
- Ghia-Aigle Coupé - 2 produced
- Stabilimenti Farina Berlinetta - 1 produced
- Abbott Cabriolet - 1 produced
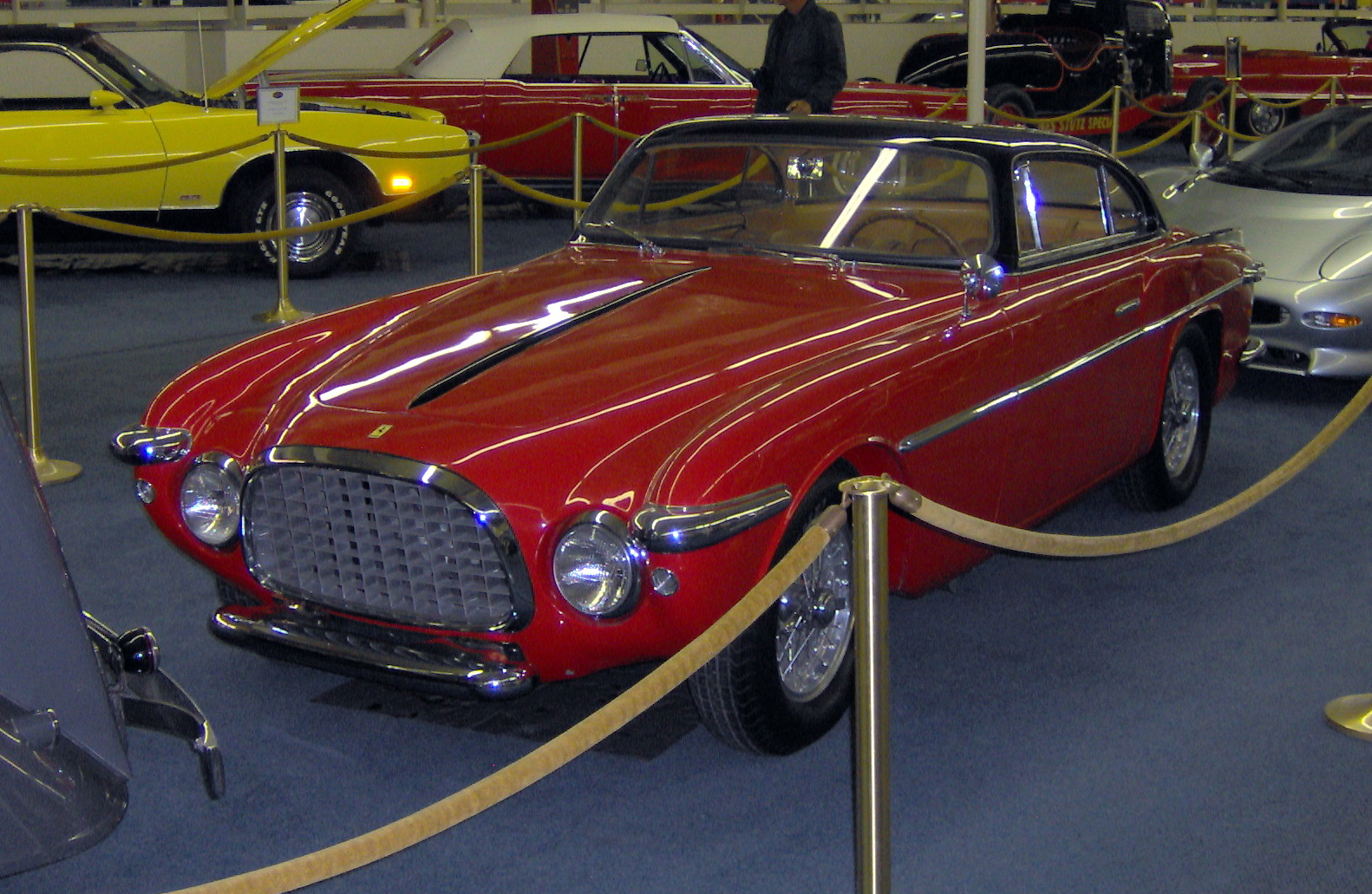
Vignale's 212 show car from 1952

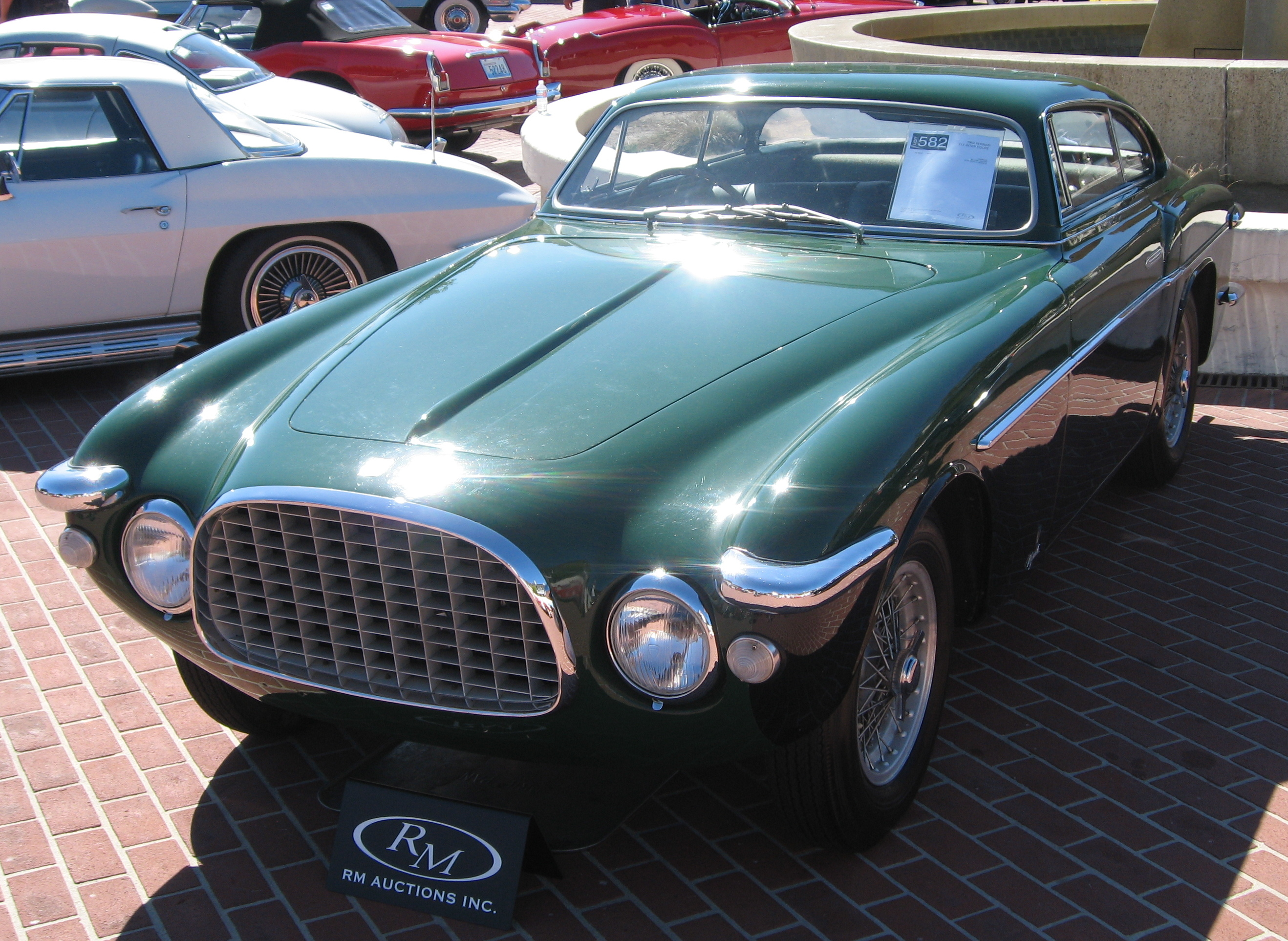
212 Vignale Coupe chassis no. 0257EU

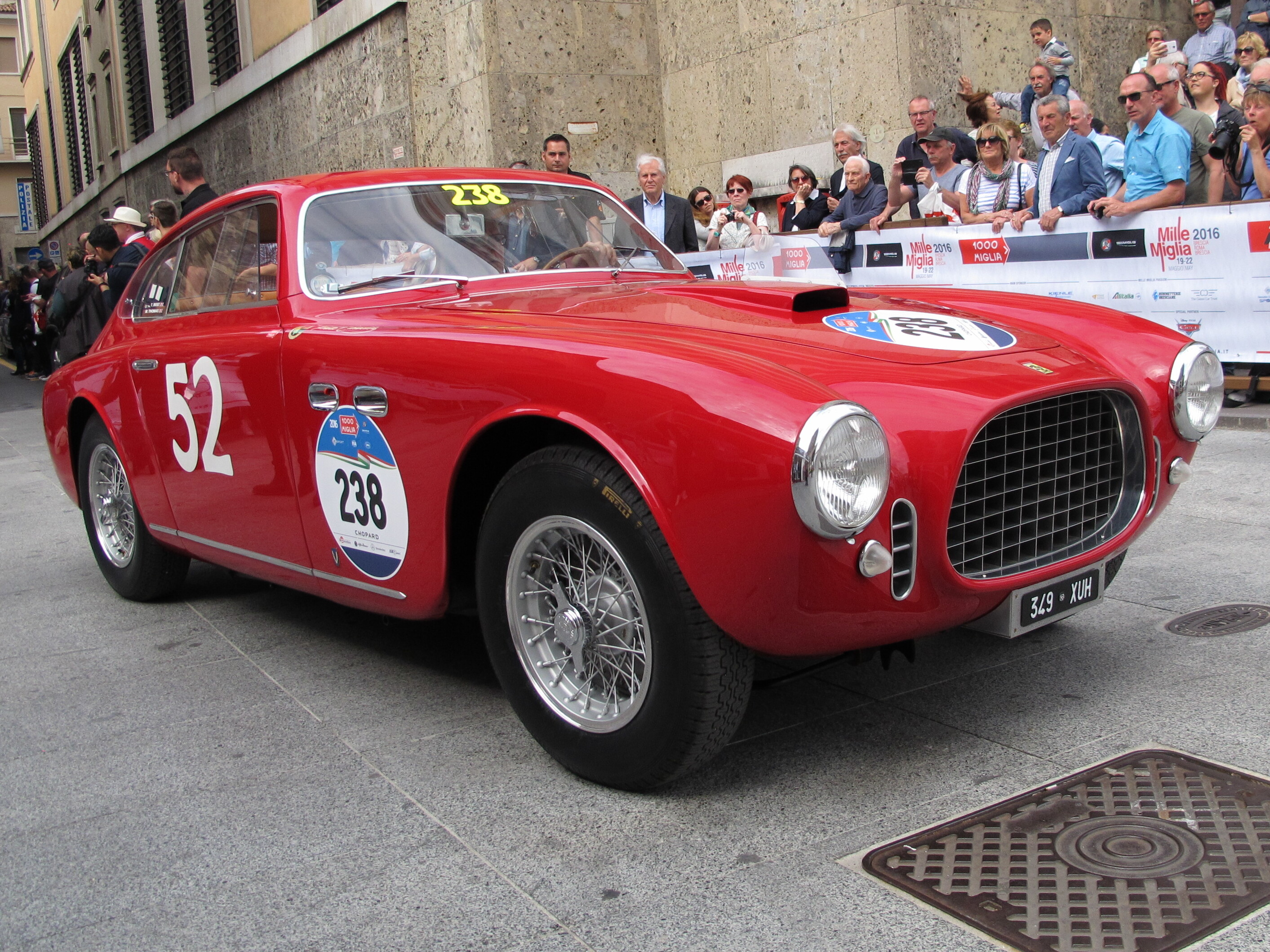
A 212 Inter Vignale at the Mille Miglia Storica

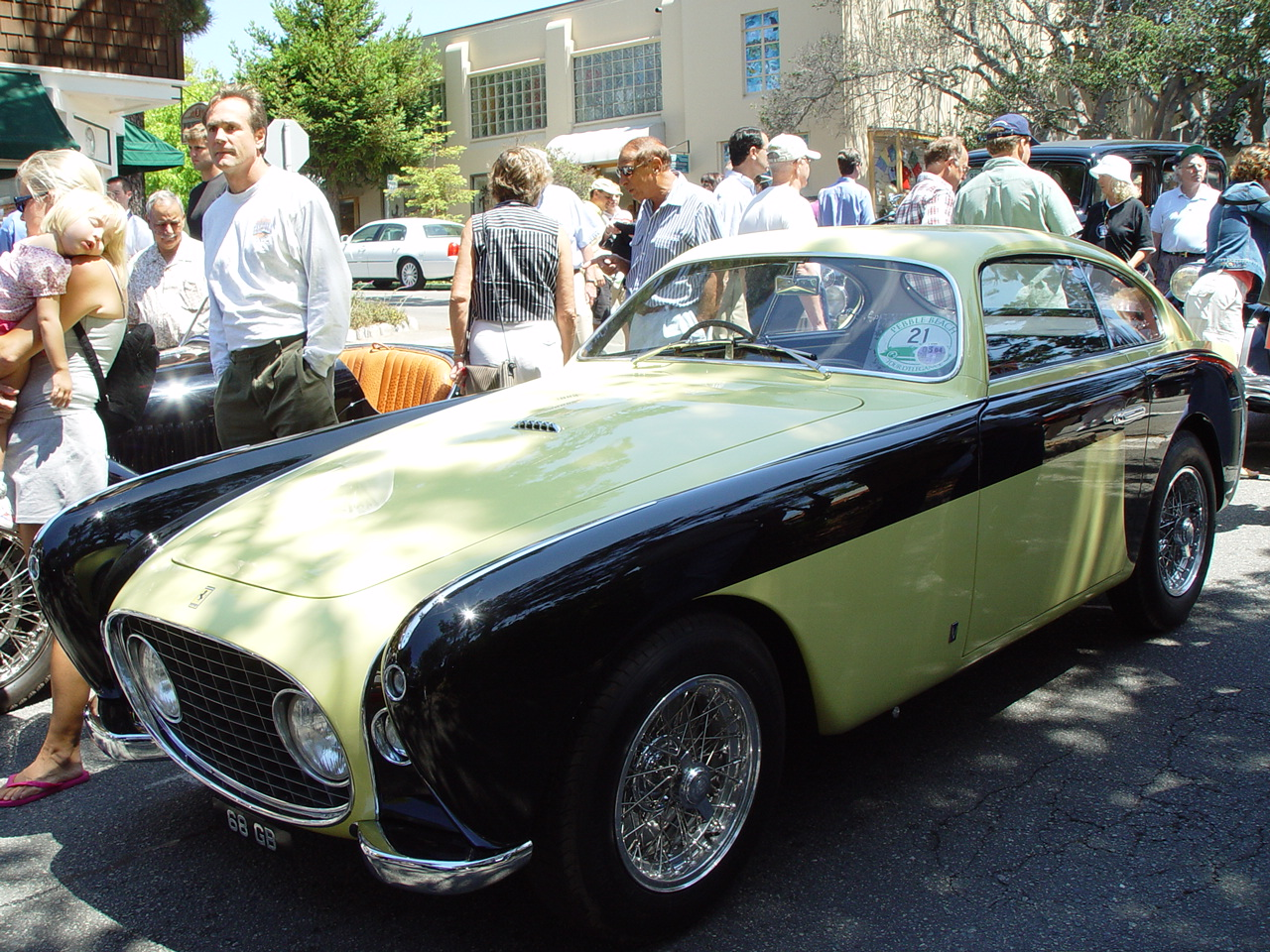
212 Inter Vignale nicknamed "Bumblebee"

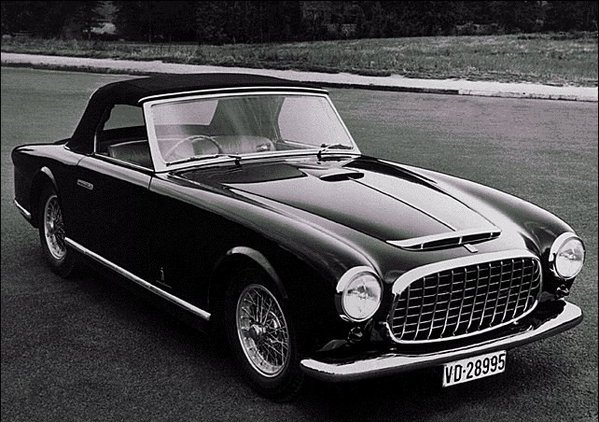
First Ferrari designed by Pinin Farina, 212 Inter Cabriolet

== 212/225 Inter ==
A single 212 Inter, chassis no. 0223EU, was fitted with the available 225 S or 2.7 L Colombo V12 engine, combined with a long wheelbase Europa type chassis, creating a unique model that would be properly referred to as a 225 Inter or 225 Europa. This 1952 one-off model was given a Giovanni Michelotti-penned coupé body built by Vignale.

Another 212 Inter, chassis number 0253EU, also received the 2.7 liter three-carburetor V12, and was bodied as the last Barchetta by Carrozzeria Touring in their Superleggera construction method. It was acquired by Ford Motor Company for Henry Ford II for study in the research leading to the development of Ford's competitor to the Corvette, the Thunderbird. The car is currently in the collection of the Petersen Automotive Museum in Los Angeles, CA.

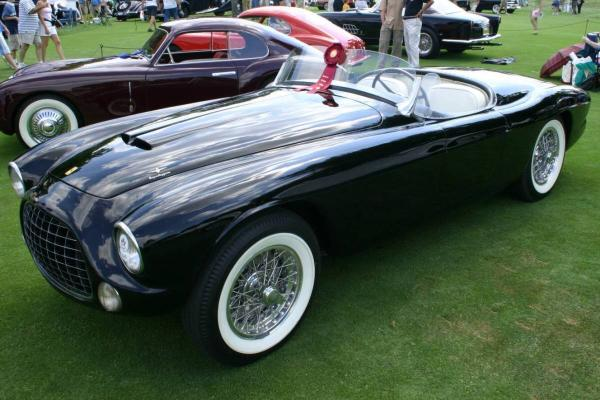
1952 Ferrari 212/225 Touring Barchetta

== Chassis numbers ==
Chassis numbers
Number	Coachbuilder	Style	Note	Paint
0107ES	Stabilimenti Farina	Berlinetta		Red
0111ES	Vignale	Coupé	First Ferrari bought by race driver Luigi Piotti	Red/White two-tone
0125EL	Vignale	Berlinetta (later rebodied to cabriolet)		Silver
0131E	Vignale	Coupé		Red
0135E	Vignale	Coupé	Sold in 2024 for an undisclosed amount	Red/Black two-tone
0137EL	Ghia-Aigle	Coupé		Black
0139E (switched numbers with 0269EU)	Vignale	Coupé	Traded in to Ferrari by Prince Bernhard for another 212 Inter which then had the chassis number switched with the new car to avoid paying import taxes.	Black
0141ET	Touring	Berlinetta		Red
0143E	Touring	Berlinetta		Blue
0145E	Ghia	Coupé	Alloy body. Sold in 2022 for $1,215,000.	Azzurro (Silver Blue)
0147E	Vignale	Coupé (later rebodied to California Spyder)		
0149E	Ghia	Coupé		
0153EL	Ghia	Coupé 2+2		
0155EL	Ghia	Coupé		Silver
0157EL	Vignale	Coupé		Black
0159E	Vignale	Cabriolet	Sold in 2022 for an undisclosed amount	Rosso Bordeaux (Wine red)
0161EL	Vignale	Coupé	Finished second after 0171EL in the 1951 Carrera Panamericana.	Blue/Silver two-tone livery
0163EL	Vignale	Coupé		
0165EL	Abbott	Cabriolet (later rebodied as Touring Barchetta)		Red
0167EL	Touring	Berlinetta		Red
0169EL	Ghia	Coupé		Red
0171EL	Vignale	Coupé	Won the 1951 Carrera Panamericana. Disappeared after.	
0173E	Vignale	Cabriolet		
0175E	Vignale	Coupé		Black/Green two-tone
0177E	Pinin Farina	Cabriolet		
0179EL	Vignale	Berlinetta		
0185EL	Ghia	Coupé		
0187EL	Vignale	Coupé		
0189EL	Ghia	Coupé		
0191EL (switched numbers with 0233EU)	Ghia	Cabriolet		Blue
0193EL	Ghia	Coupé		Blue/Grey two-tone
0195EL	Ghia-Aigle	Coupé		
0197EL	Vignale	Coupé	Sold in 2009 for $804,500.	Pale Yellow/Black two-tone
0199EL	Ghia	Coupé		
0201EL	Ghia	Coupé		
0203EL	Vignale	Berlinetta		
0205EL	Ghia	Coupé (later rebodied as 340 America)		Dark Blue
0207EL	Vignale	Cabriolet		Red
0211EL	Vignale	Berlinetta		Blue/Grey two-tone
0213EL	Ghia	Coupé		
0215EL	Touring	Berlinetta		
0217EL	Vignale	Coupé		
0219EL	Vignale	Coupé		White/Grey two-tone
0221EL	Vignale	Coupé		White/Grey two-tone
0223EU	Vignale	Coupé	One off 212/225 model.	Red/Silver two-tone
0225EL	Ghia	Coupé		
0227EL	Vignale	Cabriolet		
0229EL	Pinin Farina	Coupé		Dark Blue/White two-tone
0233EU (switched numbers with 0191EL)	Ghia	Coupé	Previously owned by Juan Perón, numbers switched with an already existing body to avoid import taxes. Sold in 2018 for $1,187,500.	Yellow/Black two-tone
0235EU	Pinin Farina	Cabriolet		Silver Blue
0237EU	Vignale	Coupé		Red
0239EU (switched numbers with 0352MM)	Vignale	Coupé	Damaged in a crash. Switched chassis numbers with a Ferrari 250 MM to avoid paying import tax and import permits to Mexico.	
0241EU	Touring	Berlinetta		
0243EU	Vignale	Berlinetta		
0245EL	Pinin Farina	Coupé		
0247EL	Pinin Farina	Coupé	Disassembled for parts.	
0249EL	Pinin Farina	Coupé (later rebodied as 250 MM)		
0251EU	Vignale	Coupé (later rebodied as Touring Barchetta)		
0253EU	Touring	Barchetta		Black
0255EU	Vignale	Cabriolet		Black
0257EU	Vignale	Coupé		
0259EU	Pinin Farina	Coupé (later rebodied as Touring Barchetta)		Red
0261EU	Pinin Farina	Coupé		
0263EU	Pinin Farina	Coupé		Silver Blue/Dark Blue two-tone
0265EU	Pinin Farina	Coupé		Black/White two-tone
0267EU	Vignale	Coupé		Black/Green two-tone
0269EU (switched numbers with 0139E, and then again with 0387GT)	Pinin Farina	Coupé	Switched numbers with another 212 to avoid paying import taxes. Later traded in for a 250 Europa GT where it again switched chassis numbers (from 0139E to 0387GT) to avoid paying taxes.	Black
0271EU	Vignale	Coupé		
0273EU	Vignale	Spyder		
0275EU	Pinin Farina	Coupé		Red
0277EU	Pinin Farina	Coupé		Silver Blue
0279EU	Pinin Farina	Coupé		Pale Blue
0281EU	Pinin Farina	Coupé		
0283EU	Pinin Farina	Coupé		
0285EU	Vignale	Coupé		
0287EU	Vignale	Coupé		
0289EU	Vignale	Coupé		Red
0291EU	Pinin Farina	Coupé		
