= Interstate 190 =

Interstate 190 may refer to the following Interstate Highways in the United States related to Interstate 90:

- Interstate 190 (Illinois), a spur into Chicago's O'Hare International Airport
- Interstate 190 (Massachusetts), a spur from Worcester to Leominster
- Interstate 190 (New York), a spur into Buffalo and Niagara Falls
- Interstate 190 (South Dakota), a spur into downtown Rapid City
