= Utah State Route 195 =

Utah State Route 195 may refer to:

- Utah State Route 195 (1947–2007), a former state highway in northwestern Salt Lake County, Utah, United States
- Utah State Route 195 (1935-1947), a former state highway in northwestern Davis and southwestern Weber counties, Utah, United States
