= Ferrari 166 Inter =

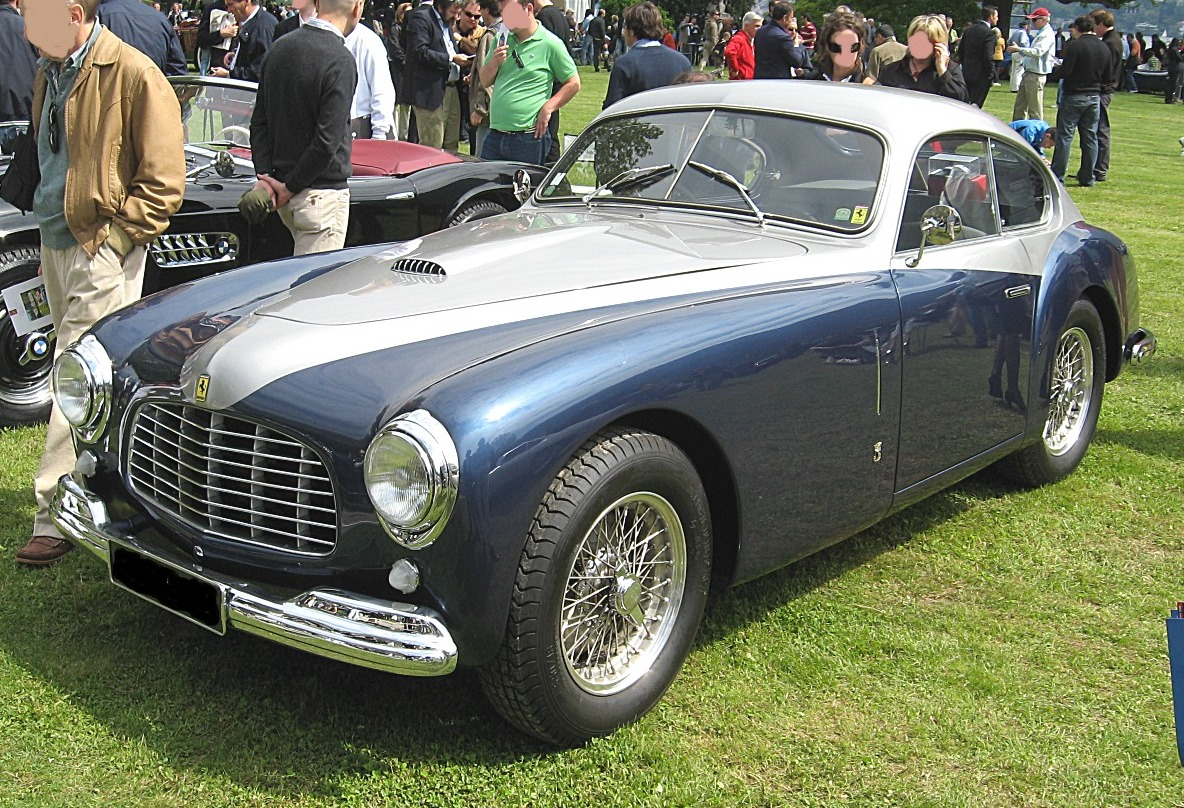
- Ferrari 166 Inter Coupé by Stabilimenti Farina

Overview
- Manufacturer: Ferrari
- Production: 1948–1950; 38 produced
- Designer: Touring; Stabilimenti Farina; Vignale

Body and chassis
- Class: Grand tourer
- Body style: Coupé; Barchetta
- Layout: FR layout

Powertrain
- Engine: 2.0 L (1995.02 cc) Colombo V12
- Transmission: 5-speed manual

Dimensions
- Wheelbase: 2,420–2,620 mm (95.3–103.1 in)
- Length: 3,950 mm (155.5 in)
- Width: 1,410 mm (55.5 in)
- Height: 1,390 mm (54.7 in)
- Curb weight: 900 kg (1,984 lb) (coupé)

Chronology
- Successor: Ferrari 195 Inter

The Ferrari 166 Inter was Ferrari's first true grand tourer. An evolution of the 125 S and 166 S racing cars, it was a sports car for the street with coachbuilt bodies. The Inter name commemorated the victories claimed in 166 S models by Scuderia Inter. 38 units of the 166 Inter were built from 1948 through 1950. Note that both the 166 S and 166 F2 were also called "166 Inter" in the days that they were actively raced by the Scuderia of the same name.

The 166 Inter shared its Aurelio Lampredi-designed tube frame, double wishbone/live axle suspension, and 2,420 mm (95.3 in) wheelbase with the 125 S and 166 S. It was replaced by the 2.3 L 195 Inter in 1950.

The first Ferrari GT car debuted at the Paris Motor Show on October 6, 1949. It was a coupé designed by Carrozzeria Touring of Milan, who had previously created a number of similar Ferrari and Alfa Romeo models. Customer sales soon started, with 166 Inter models becoming the first Ferraris to be purchased for the road rather than the race track. As was typical at the time, a bare chassis was delivered to the coachbuilder of the customer's choice. The majority used Touring, opting for a coupé or barchetta style. Carrozzeria Ghia produced a one-off coupé designed by Felice Mario Boano. Others were built by Stabilimenti Farina, who penned coupés and cabriolets. Bertone bodied one cabriolet. Vignale also joined in with seven bodyworks, presaging their designs of the coming decade, foreshadowed those companies' later involvement with Ferrari.

The 2.0 L Gioacchino Colombo-designed V12 engine from the 166 S remained, as did its chassis, though the wheelbase would eventually grow from 2,420 mm (95.3 in) to 2,500 mm (98.4 in) and even 2,620 mm (103.1 in). Output was 90 PS (66 kW) at 5600 rpm, with one carburetor, and a top speed of 150 km/h (93 mph).

== Gallery ==
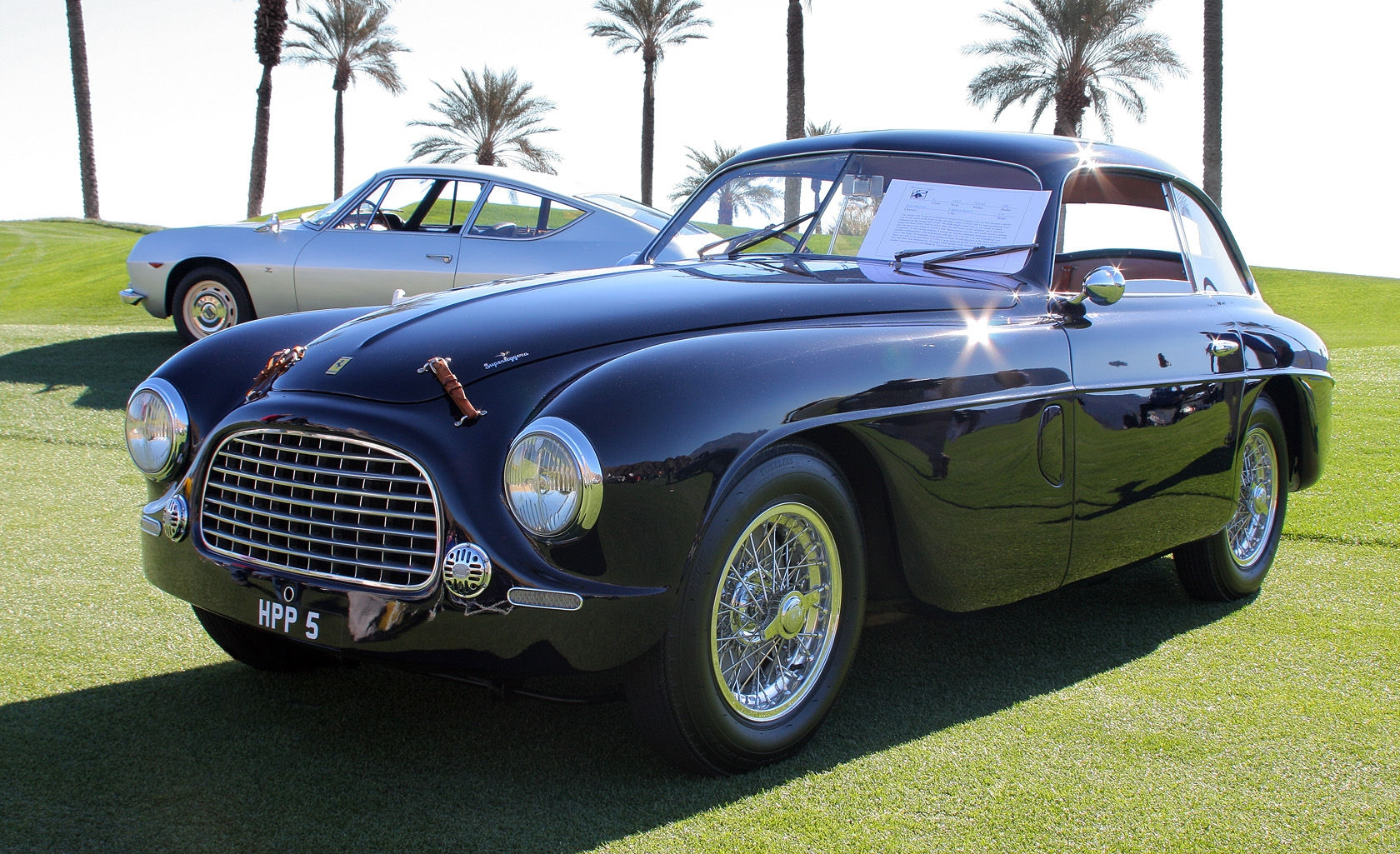
Ferrari 166 Inter Coupe by Touring

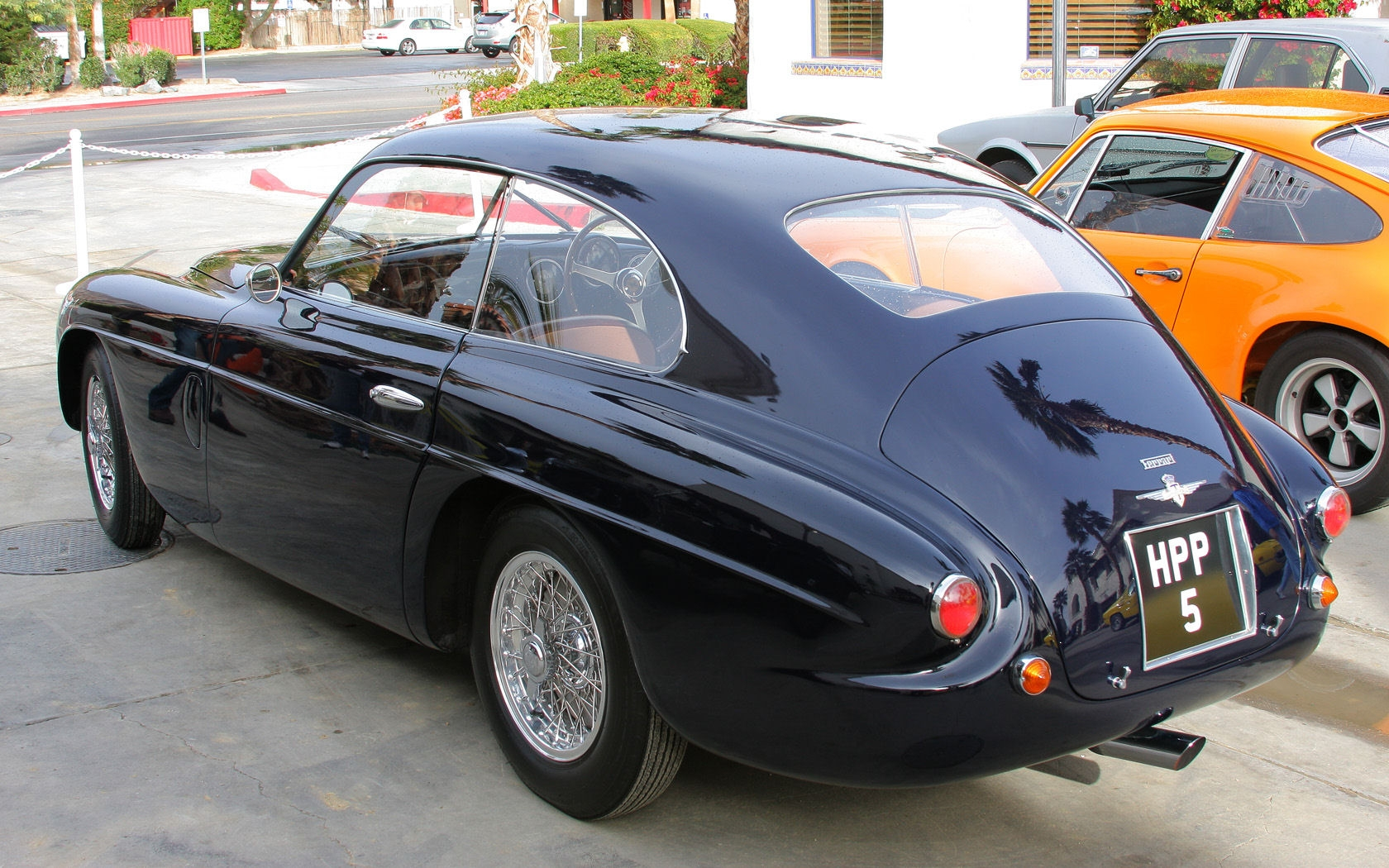
Ferrari 166 Inter Coupe by Touring (rear)

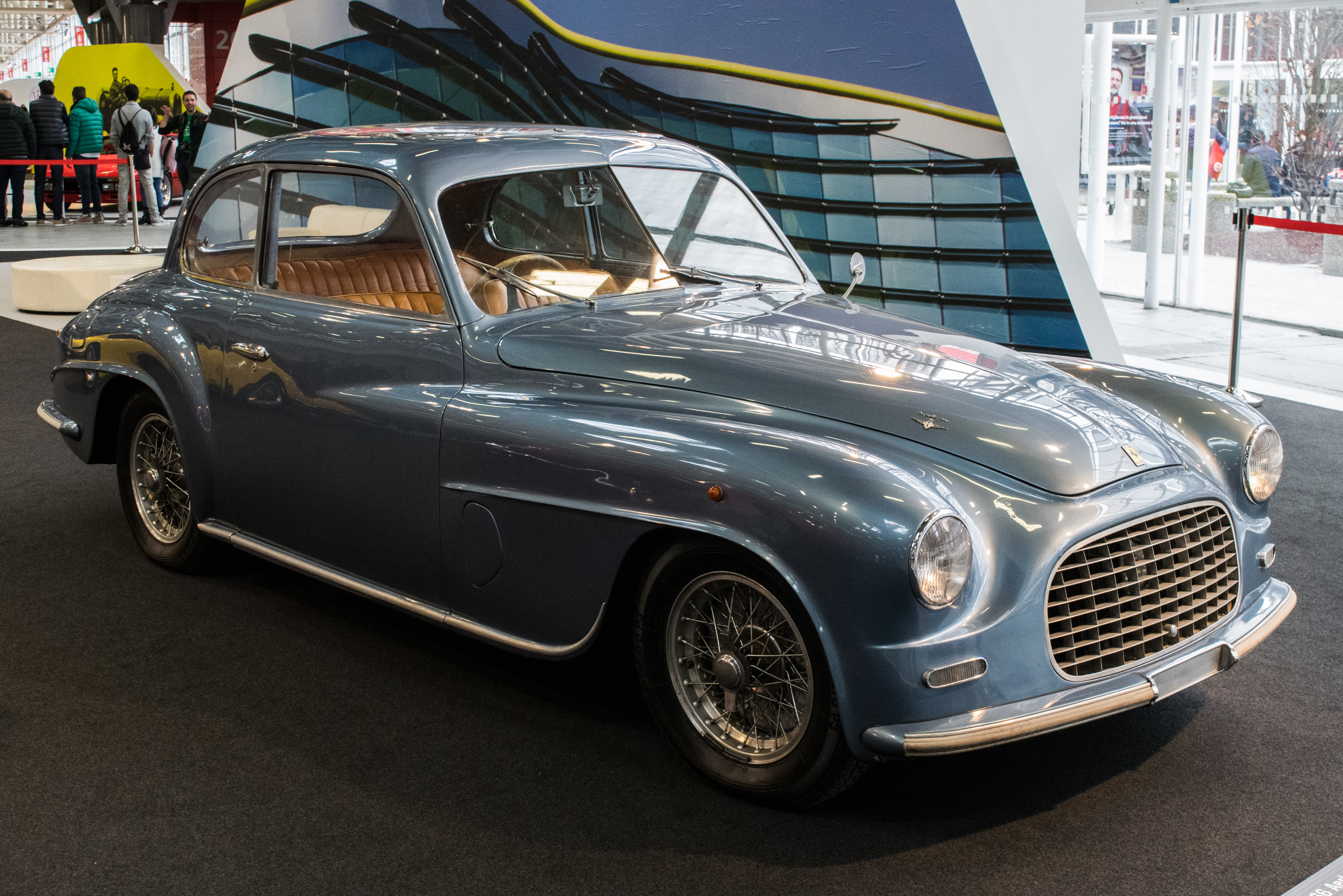
Ferrari 166 Inter Coupe by Touring

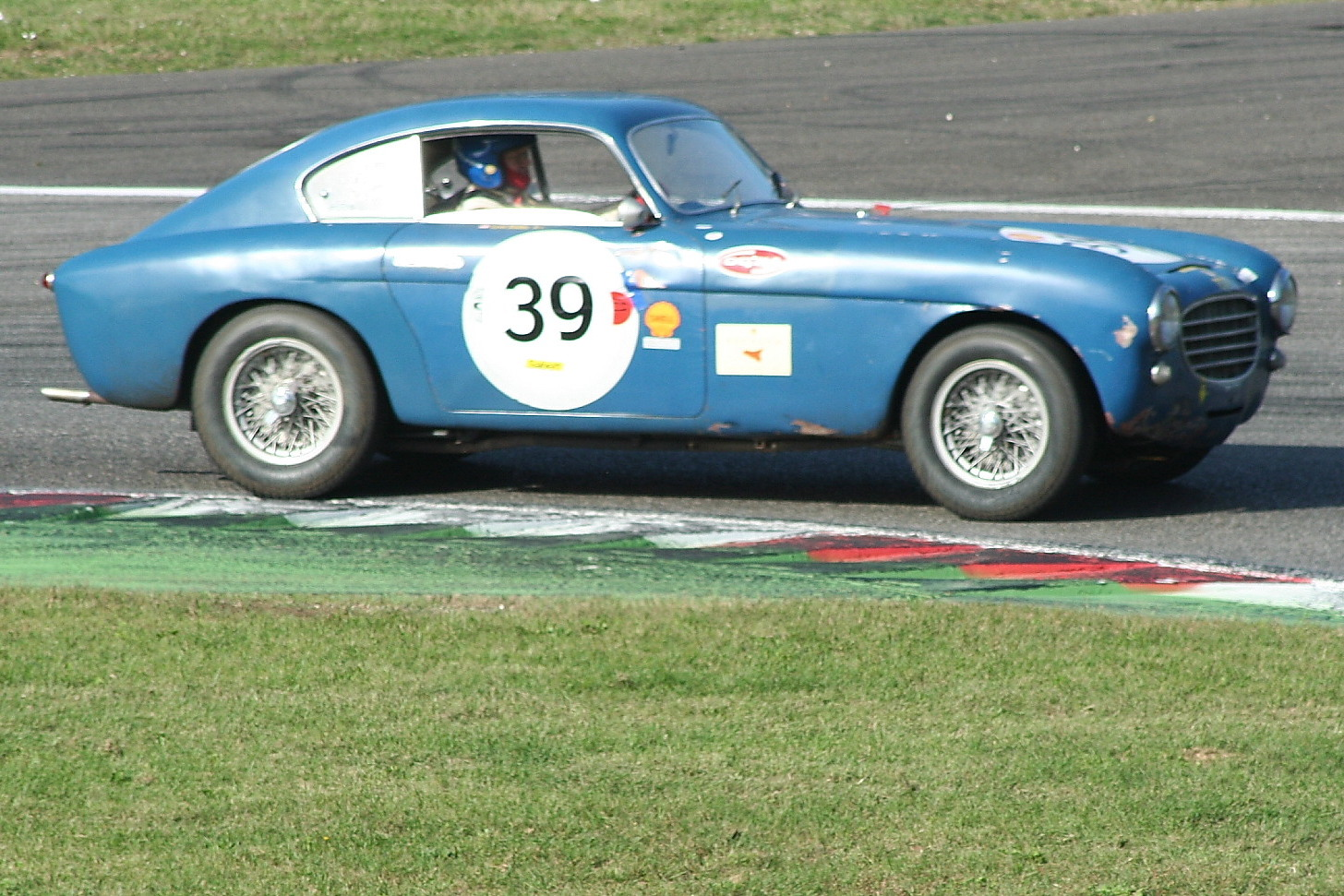
Ferrari 166 Inter Coupe by Vignale

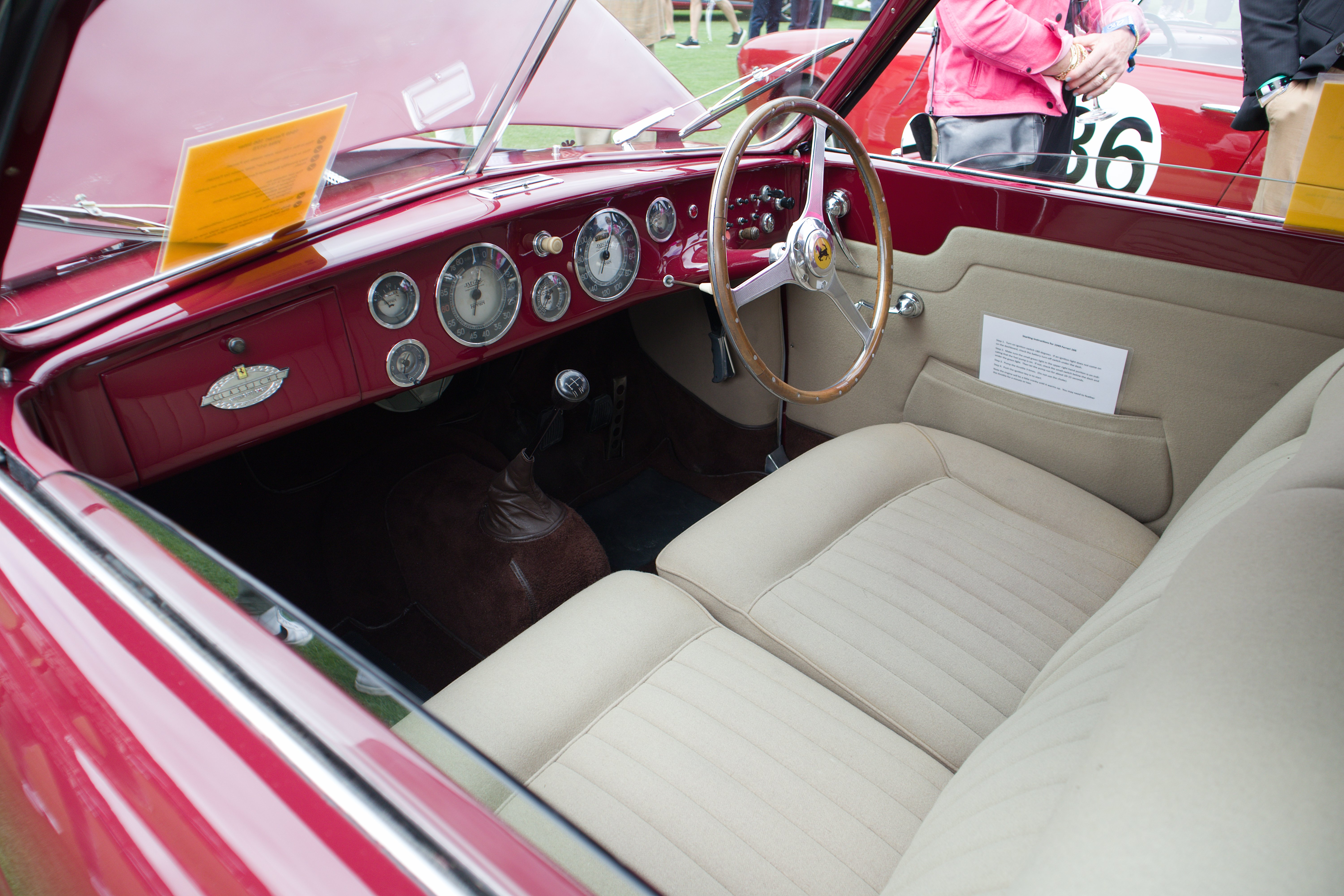
Ferrari 166 Inter Touring interior
