= Ohio State Route 194 =

State Route 194

Route information
- Maintained by ODOT

Location
- Country: United States
- State: Ohio

Highway system
- Ohio State Highway System; Interstate; US; State; Scenic
| ← SR 193 | → SR 195 |

In Ohio, State Route 194 may refer to:

- Ohio State Route 194 (1923), now part of SR 500
- Ohio State Route 194 (1920s-1960s), now part of SR 103
