= Interstate 195 =

Interstate 195 (I-195) is the designation for the following six existing Interstate Highways in the United States, all of which are related to I-95:

- Interstate 195 (Maine), a spur in Saco
- Interstate 195 (Maryland), a spur to BWI Airport
- Interstate 195 (New Jersey), a spur to the Jersey Shore
- Interstate 195 (Rhode Island–Massachusetts), a spur to Cape Cod
- Interstate 195 (Virginia), a spur in Richmond
- Interstate 195 (Florida), a spur in Miami

Other

- Interstate 195 (District of Columbia), a future designation for the north–south portion of I-395 from the Southeast–Southwest Freeway to New York Avenue
- Interstate 195 (Delaware), a proposed portion of I-95 in Delaware, while under construction
