= Port of Whitman County =

Port authority in Washington, United States

The Port of Whitman County is a port authority in Whitman County in the U.S. state of Washington. It operates Port of Wilma on the Snake River near the Idaho state line (46°25′20″N 117°06′00″W), where it owned a grain elevator as of 1996. The port authority was created by voters in 1958.

== Tenants ==
Schweitzer Engineering Laboratories manufacturing has been located at the Port's Pullman Industrial Park in Pullman, Washington since 1988.
