= Ferrari 195 Inter =

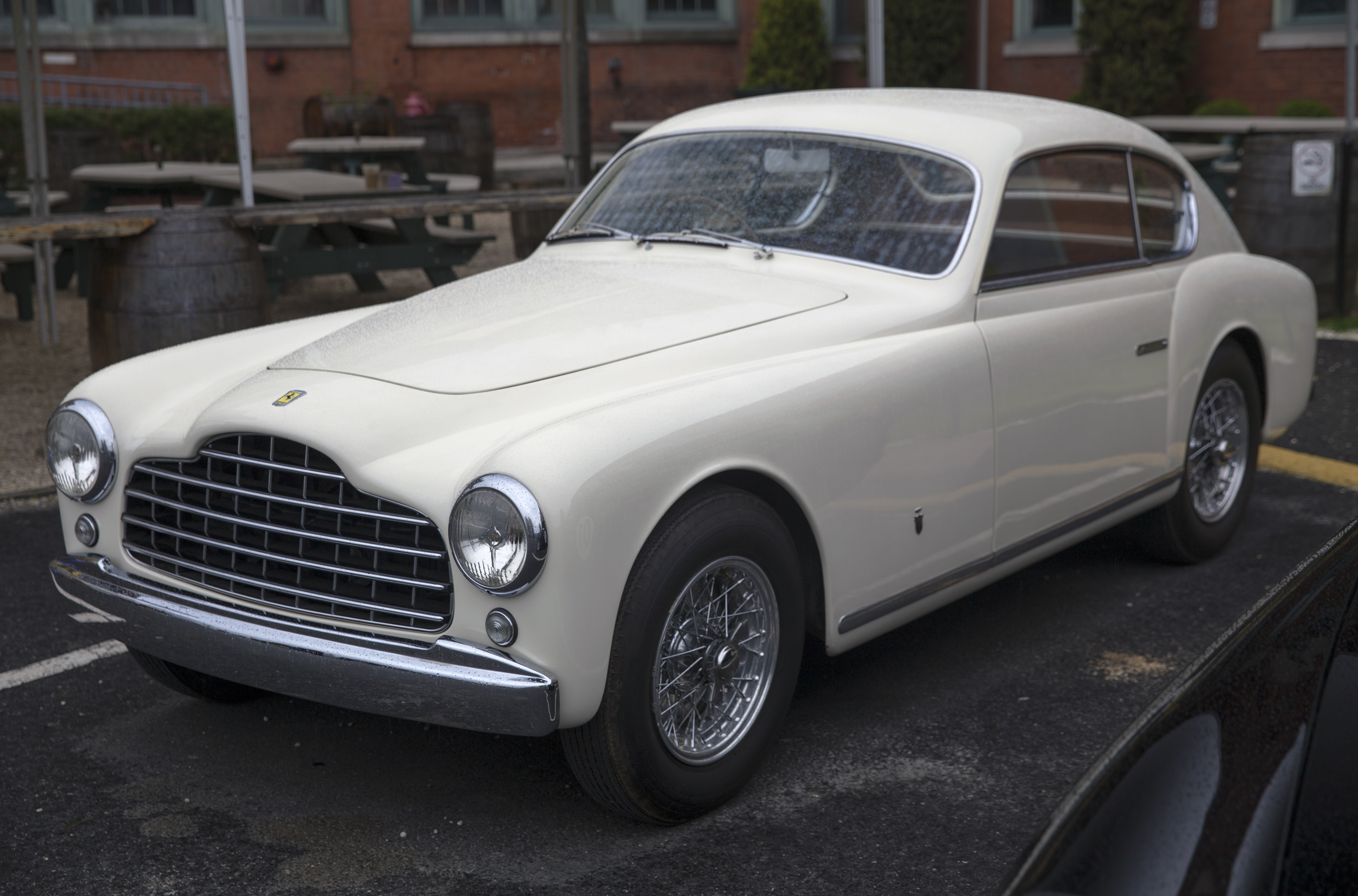
- Ferrari 195 Inter by Ghia

Overview
- Manufacturer: Ferrari
- Production: 1950–1951; 27 produced
- Designer: Vignale; Ghia; Touring; Motto

Body and chassis
- Class: Grand tourer
- Layout: FR layout

Powertrain
- Engine: 2.3 L (2341.02 cc) Colombo V12
- Transmission: 5-speed manual

Dimensions
- Wheelbase: 2,500 mm (98 in)
- Curb weight: 950 kg (2,094 lb) (coupé)

Chronology
- Predecessor: Ferrari 166 Inter
- Successor: Ferrari 212 Inter

See also the 195 S sports racer

The Ferrari 195 Inter is a sports car produced by Ferrari between 1950 and 1951, as a grand tourer (GT) version of the Ferrari 195 S racer.

Introduced at the 1950 Paris Motor Show, it was similar to the 166 Inter shown a year earlier and was aimed at the same affluent clientele. 27 were built in less than a year, receiving the odd-numbered chassis numbers. Out of the 27 cars, 12 were bodied by Carrozzeria Vignale, 11 by Carrozzeria Ghia, 3 by Carrozzeria Touring and 1 by Motto.

The more-potent (but otherwise similar) Ferrari 212 Inter was introduced at the 1951 Paris Motor Show and replaced the 195 Inter.

Like the last of the 166 Inters, the wheelbase was stretched by 80 mm (3.1 in) to 2,500 mm (98.4 in), but the larger 2.3 L (2341 cc/142 in³) version of the Colombo V12 was the true differentiator. The engine increase was accomplished by pushing the bore from 60 to 65 mm, retaining the 58.8 mm stroke. A single Weber 36DCF carburettor was normally fitted, for a total output of 130 PS (96 kW; 128 hp) though some used triple carbs.

== Chassis Numbers ==
Chassis No.	Body manufacturer	Paint color	Note
0081 S	Touring	Dark Blue	Sold in 2017 for €900,000
0083 S	Vignale		Raced in the Coppa Intereuropa race
0085 S	Touring	Red	
0087 S	Ghia	Light Green	
0089 S	Ghia	Red/Black two-tone	
0091 S	Vignale		
0093 S	Ghia		
0095 S	Vignale		
0097 S	Vignale		
0099 S	Vignale		
0101 S	Ghia	White	
0103 S	Vignale	White/Blue two-tone	
0105 S	Ghia	Black	
0109 S	Ghia	Blue	
0113 S	Ghia	Red	Sold in 2018 for €590,000
0115 S	Vignale	Dark Green	
0117 S	Motto	Light Yellow	Raced in several events
0119 S	Vignale	Silver/Dark Green two-tone	
0121 S	Ghia		
0123 S	Touring		
0127 E	Vignale		
0129 S	Ghia	Avorio Antico (white)	
0133 S	Ghia		
0151 S	Vignale		
0181 EL	Vignale		
0183 EL	Ghia		Re-engined and rebodied in the style of a Ferrari 166 MM
0209 EL	Vignale		

== Gallery ==
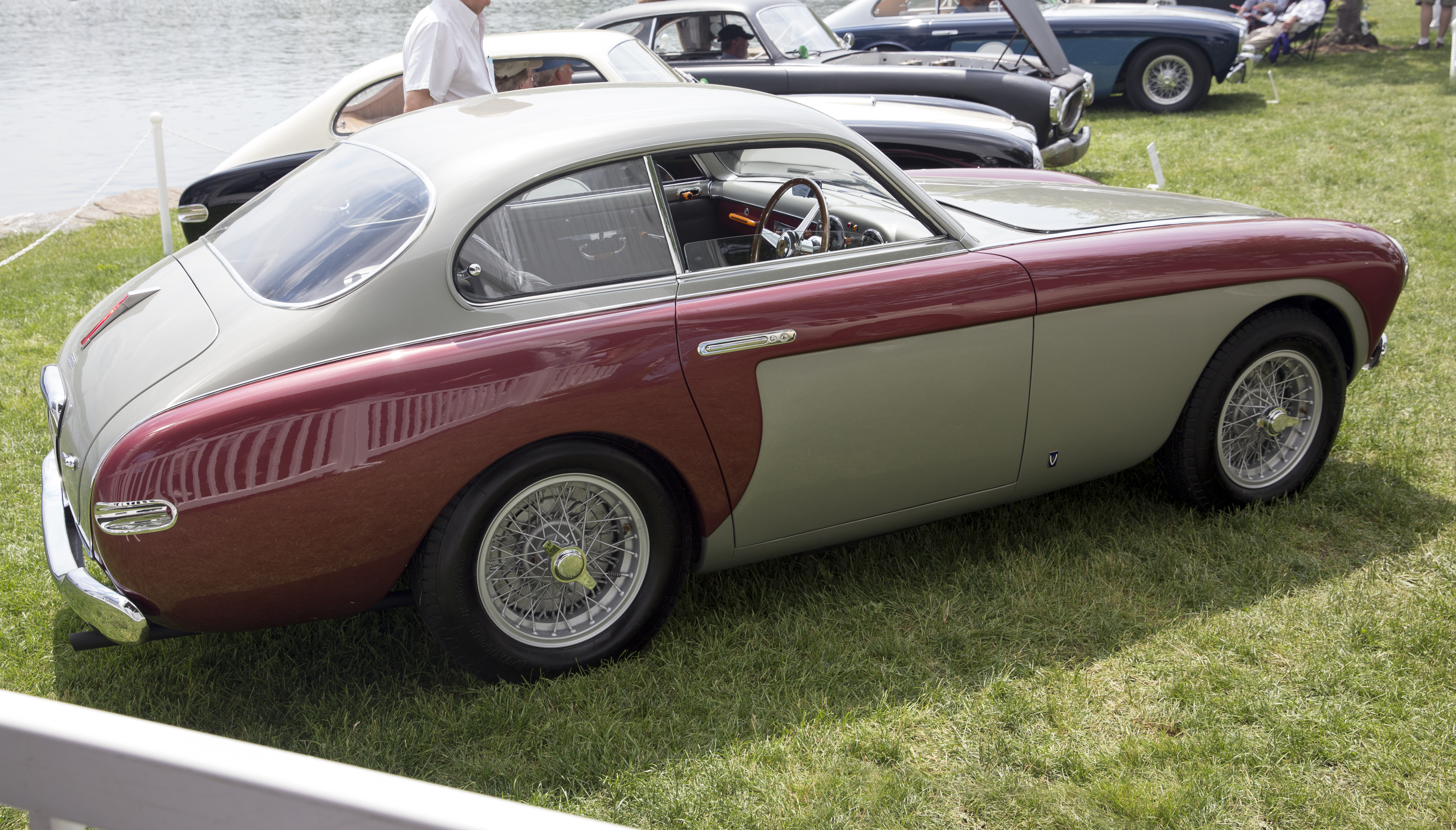
1950 Ferrari 195 Inter Vignale Competizione Coupé

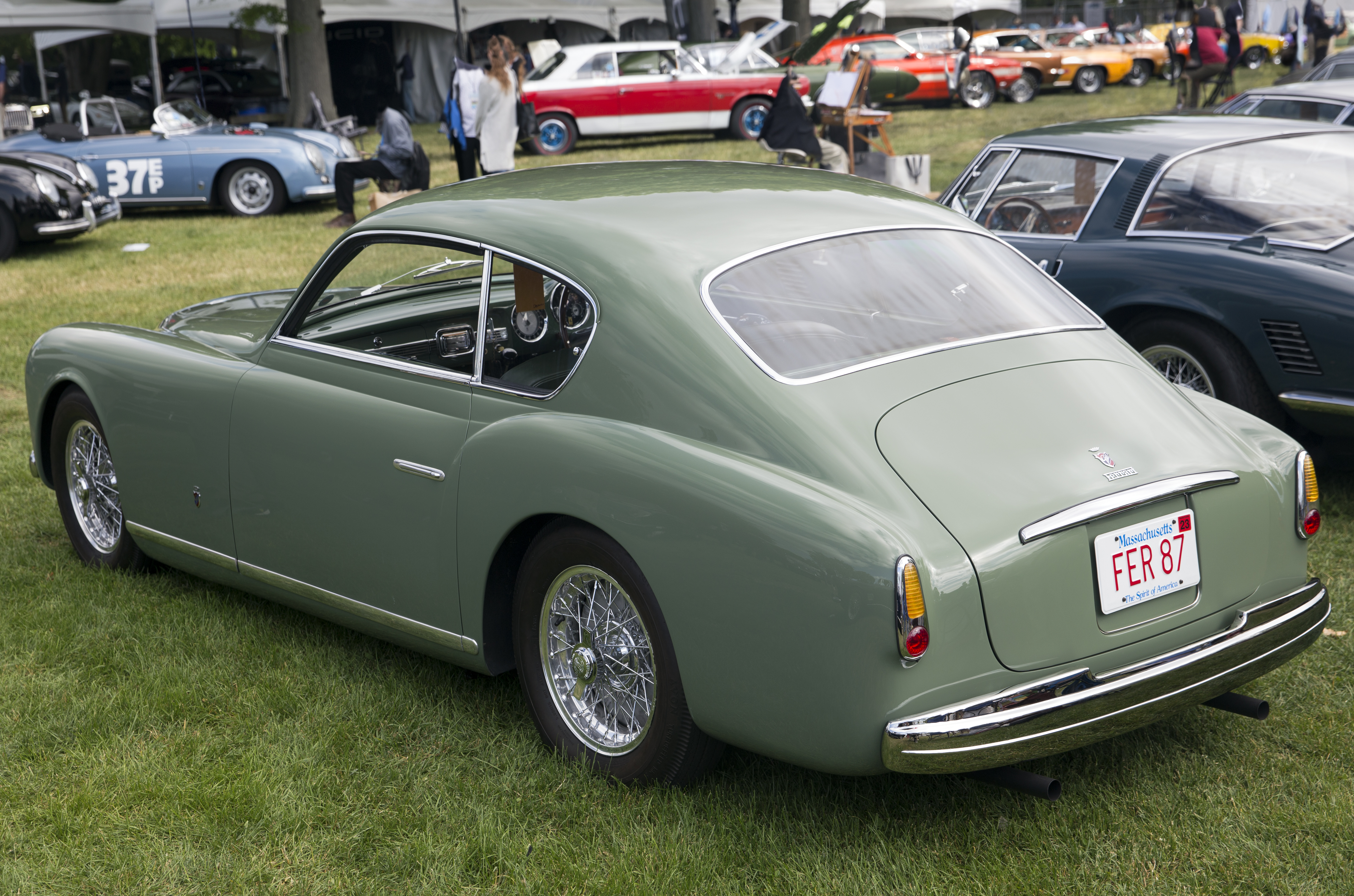
1950 Ferrari 195 Inter Ghia Coupé; rear view
