= 195th Ohio Infantry Regiment =

- Active: March 14, 1865, to December 18, 1865
- Country: United States
- Allegiance: Union
- Branch: Infantry

The 195th Ohio Infantry Regiment, sometimes 195th Ohio Volunteer Infantry (or 195th OVI) was an infantry regiment in the Union Army during the American Civil War.

== Service ==
The 195th Ohio Infantry was organized at Camp Chase in Columbus, Ohio, and mustered in March 14 through March 20, 1865, for one year service under the command of Colonel Henry Blackstone Banning.

The regiment left Ohio for Harpers Ferry, West Virginia, March 22–25; then to Winchester, Virginia, and was assigned to Brooks' Provisional Division, Army of the Shenandoah. Ordered to Alexandria, Virginia, April 28 and served provost duty there until December.

The 195th Ohio Infantry mustered out of service December 18, 1865, at Alexandria, Virginia.

== Casualties ==
The regiment lost a total of 32 enlisted men during service, all due to disease.

== Commanders ==
- Colonel Henry Blackstone Banning

== Notable members ==
- Colonel Henry Blackstone Banning - U.S. Representative from Ohio, 1873-1879
- Lt. Colonel Marcellus J.W. Holter - Brevet Brigadier General, USV

== See also ==
- List of Ohio Civil War units
- Ohio in the Civil War
