= Modena Grand Prix =

Non-championship motor race in Modena, Italy

- Aerautodromo di Modena
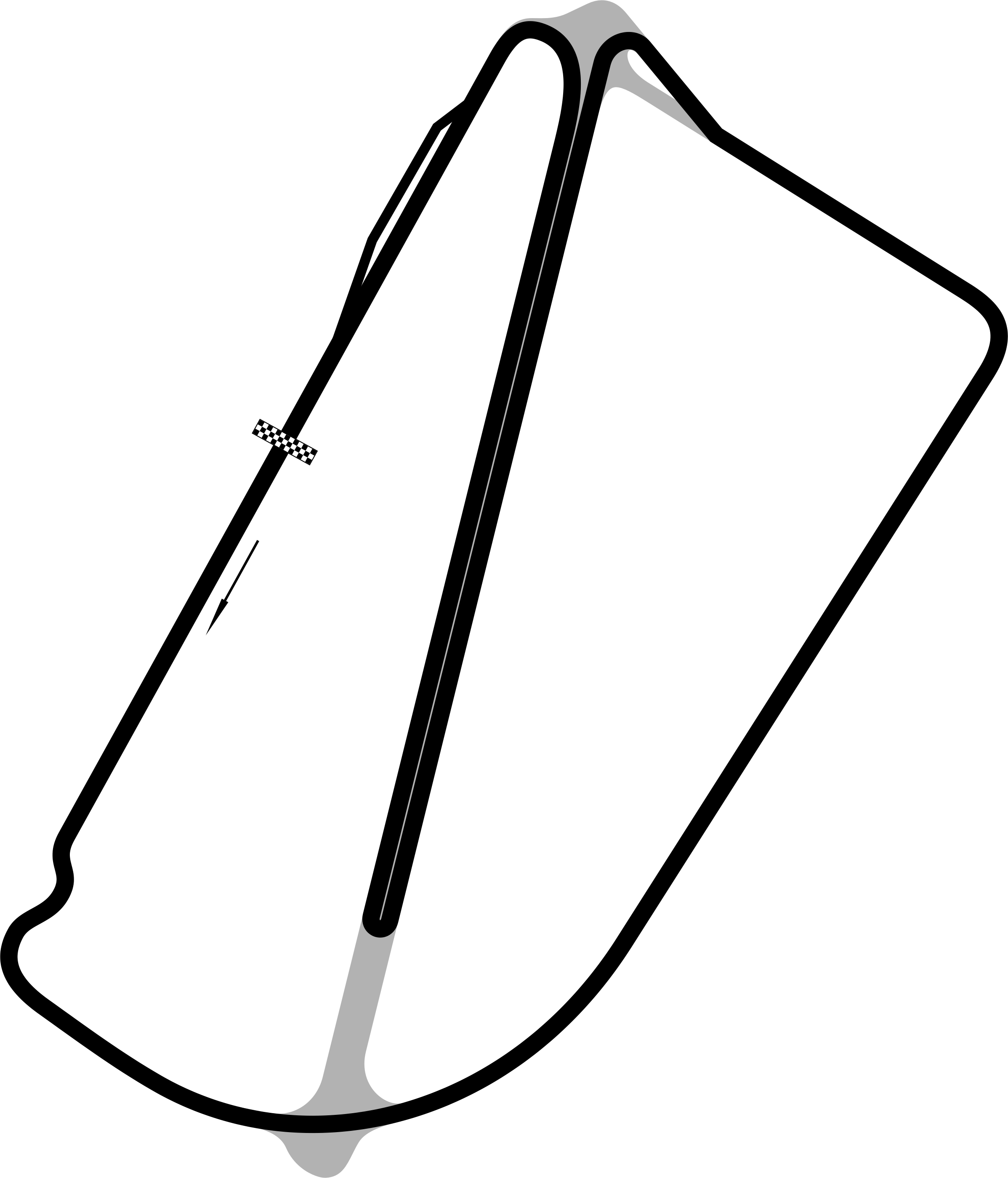

Race information
- Number of times held: 16
- First held: 1927
- Last held: 1961
- Most wins (drivers): (Italy) Tazio Nuvolari (Italy) Alberto Ascari (3 wins)
- Most wins (constructors): (Italy) / (Italy) Maserati (7 wins)

The Modena Grand Prix, initially called Circuito di Modena, was a motor race held at Aerautodromo di Modena in Emilia-Romagna, Italy.

== History ==
The first two editions of the Modena Grand Prix took place on a 12 km-long road track around the area where the autodrome would be eventually built. Enzo Ferrari won on both occasions. The race was then discontinued until 1938, when it took place on a shorter permutation of the circuit known as Circuito del Parco or Anello dei Viali. Tazio Nuvolari won three times. In 1947, following a serious accident that resulted in the death of five spectators, the race track was the subject of a significant number of upgrades, and the Modena Grand Prix was re-introduced in 1950. The last race was held on 3 September 1961 and was won by Stirling Moss in a Lotus 18/21.

== Winners of the Modena Grand Prix ==
Year	Title	Driver	Car	Class	Report
1927	I Circuito di Modena	(Italy) Enzo Ferrari / Giulio Ramponi	Alfa Romeo 6C 1500 SS	Formula Libre	Report
1928	II Circuito di Modena	(Italy) Enzo Ferrari / Eugenio Siena	Alfa Romeo 6C 1500 SS Compressor	Formula Libre	Report
1934	III Circuito di Modena	(Italy) Tazio Nuvolari	Maserati 6C 34	Grand Prix	Report
1934	III Circuito di Modena Junior	(Italy) Raffaele Cecchini	MG K3	Voiturette (1100 cc)	Report
1935	IV Circuito di Modena	(Italy) Tazio Nuvolari	Alfa Romeo 8C	Grand Prix	Report
1935	IV Circuito di Modena Junior	(Italy) Ippolito Berrone	Maserati 4CM-1500	Voiturette	Report
1936	V Circuito di Modena	(Italy) Tazio Nuvolari	Alfa Romeo 12C-36	Grand Prix	Report
1936	V Circuito di Modena Junior	(Italy) Carlo Felice Trossi	Maserati 6CM	Voiturette	Report
1938	VI Circuito di Modena	(Italy) Franco Cortese	Maserati 6CM	Voiturette	Report
1946	VII Circuito di Modena	(Italy) Franco Cortese	Lancia Astura Spider	Sport	Report
1947	VIII Circuito di Modena	(Italy) Alberto Ascari	Maserati A6	Sport	Report
1950	I Gran Premio di Modena	(Italy) Alberto Ascari	Ferrari 166 F2/50	Formula 2	Report
1951	II Gran Premio di Modena	(Italy) Alberto Ascari	Ferrari 500 F2	Formula 2	Report
1952	III Gran Premio di Modena	(Italy) Luigi Villoresi	Ferrari 500 F2	Formula 2	Report
1953	IV Gran Premio di Modena	(Argentina) Juan Manuel Fangio	Maserati A6GCM/53	Formula 2	Report
1957	V Gran Premio di Modena	(France) Jean Behra	Maserati 250F	Formula 1	Report
1960	VI Gran Premio di Modena	(Sweden) Joakim Bonnier	Porsche 718/2	Formula 2	Report
1961	VII Gran Premio di Modena	(United Kingdom) Stirling Moss	Lotus 18/21	Formula 1	Report

== Lap records ==
The fastest official race lap records at the Aerautodromo di Modena are listed as:

Category	Time	Driver	Vehicle	Event
Airfield Circuit (1950–1975): 2.366 km (1.470 mi)
Formula Two	0:59.000	Jo Bonnier (Note: Both drivers took the same lap time independently.); Wolfgang von Trips	Porsche 718/2; Ferrari Dino 156P	1960 Modena Grand Prix
Formula One	0:59.200	Stirling Moss	Lotus 18/21	1961 Modena Grand Prix
Sports car racing	1:01.900	Odoardo Govoni	Maserati Tipo 60	1960 Coppa d'Oro di Modena
Full Circuit (1950–1953): 3.800 km (2.361 mi)
Formula Two	1:53.200	Alberto Ascari	Ferrari 500 F2	1951 Modena Grand Prix
Sports car racing	2:06.000	Sergio Sighinolfi	Stanguellini S1100	1950 Modena Grand Prix Sports Car Race
