= 1950 Modena Grand Prix =

Race details
- Date: 7 May 1950
- Official name: I Gran Premio di Modena
- Location: Aerautodromo di Modena, Modena, Italy
- Course: Permanent racing facility
- Course length: 3.8 km (2.4 mi)
- Distance: 80 laps, 304 km (189 mi)
- Weather: Rain

Pole position
Driver	(Italy) Alberto Ascari	Ferrari
- Time: 1:57.5

Fastest lap
Driver	(Italy) Alberto Ascari	Ferrari
- Time: 1:58.2

Podium
First	(Italy) Alberto Ascari	Ferrari
Second	(Italy) Mario Tadini	Private
Third	(Italy) Piero Carini	OSCA

The 1950 Modena Grand Prix was a Formula Two motor race held on 7 May 1950 to inaugurate the Aerautodromo di Modena, Italy. Raced in front of 50,000 spectators, the 304 km race was won by Italian driver Alberto Ascari in a Ferrari 166 F2/50. Ascari also set the fastest lap and started from pole position.

== History ==
After the severe accident at the 8th Circuito Automobilistico di Modena on 28 September 1947, when Giovanni Bracco's Delage 3000 crashed into the crowd at 130 km/h, killing 5 spectators and injuring 19, street racing in the city was brought to an end. It was then decided to build a modern racetrack, similar to the Indianapolis Motor Speedway (where spectators could watch the entire race), to serve the hometown automakers Ferrari, Maserati, and Stanguellini.

Construction of the track, which would also serve as an airport (later inaugurated on 12 December), began on 28 March 1949. On 7 May, the aerodrome was officially inaugurated by the Minister of the Merchant Navy, Alberto Simonini, alongside other civil, military, and religious authorities.

== Race ==
The public was eager to see the duel between Juan Manuel Fangio and Ascari. Ascari was driving a new Ferrari 166 F2/50 featuring a De Dion tube rear suspension and a rounded nose, while the Argentine was equipped with an older model.

The Grand Prix started at 15:50 under the rain. Dorino Serafini made the best start, taking the lead, but was quickly overtaken by Ascari, followed by Fangio in third. A few laps later, El Chueco regained second position, but on lap 19 he was forced to retire due to an engine connecting rod failure. Ascari won the race at an average speed of 108.875 km/h, followed by Mario Tadini two laps down. Piero Carini in an OSCA finished third, after a long battle with Sergio Sighinolfi's Stanguellini (who later retired on lap 29).

== Classification ==
Pos	No.	Driver	Entrant	Car	Laps	Time/Retired
1	14	(Italy) Alberto Ascari	Scuderia Ferrari	Ferrari 166 F2/50	80	2:47:31.4
2	20	(Italy) Mario Tadini	Private	Ferrari 166 F2	78	+2 laps
3		(Italy) Piero Carini	Automobili OSCA	OSCA MT4	76	+4 laps
4		(Italy) Nello Pagani	Scuderia Achille Varzi	Simca-Gordini T15	74	+6 laps
5		(Italy) Pietro Palmieri	Private	Maserati A6GCS	72	+8 laps
6		(Italy) Vittorio Casalegno	Private	Cisitalia D46-Fiat	70	+10 laps
7		(Italy) Angelo Mijorini	Private	Cisitalia D46-Fiat	68	+12 laps
Ret		(Italy) Sergio Sighinolfi	Automobili Stanguellini	Stanguellini-Fiat	29	Retired
Ret	18	(Italy) Dorino Serafini	Scuderia Ferrari	Ferrari 166 F2	24	Cylinder head
Ret	16	(Argentina) Juan Manuel Fangio	Automovil Club Argentina	Ferrari 166 F2	17	Engine
Ret		(Italy) Clemente Biondetti	Private	Ferrari 166 SC	12	Gearbox
Ret		(Argentina) Roberto Mieres	Scuderia Achille Varzi	Simca-Gordini T15	11	Suspension
Ret		(Italy) Ernesto Bianchi	Private	Cisitalia D46-Fiat	6	Accident

== See also ==
- Aerautodromo di Modena
- Modena Grand Prix
