= Caraceni =

Caraceni may refer to

- Caraceni (company), Italian tailoring house
- Caraceni (tribe), Italic Samnite tribe
- Augusto Caraceni, former Italian racing driver
