= 1952 Modena Grand Prix =

Race details
- Date: 14 September 1952
- Official name: III Gran Premio di Modena
- Location: Aerautodromo di Modena, Modena, Italy
- Course: Permanent racing facility
- Course length: 2.306 km (1.433 mi)
- Distance: 100 laps, 230.620 km (143.301 mi)

Pole position
Driver	(Italy) Alberto Ascari	Ferrari
- Time: 1:04.4

Fastest lap
Drivers	(Italy) Alberto Ascari	Ferrari
	(Argentina) José Froilán González	Maserati
- Time: 1:05.0

Podium
First	(Italy) Luigi Villoresi	Ferrari
Second	(Argentina) José Froilán González	Maserati
Third	(Italy) Sergio Sighinolfi; (Italy) Alberto Ascari	Ferrari

The 3rd Gran Premio di Modena was a Formula Two motor race held on 14 September 1952 at the Aerautodromo di Modena, Italy. The race was run over 100 laps of the circuit, and was won by Italian driver Luigi Villoresi in a Ferrari 500 in a near dead-heat with José Froilán González in a Maserati A6GCM. Villoresi and Gonzalez shared fastest lap. Sergio Sighinolfi and Alberto Ascari shared third place in a Ferrari 500. Ascari had started from pole but retired with mechanical problems, and took over Sighinolfi's car.

== Classification ==
Pos	No.	Driver	Entrant	Constructor	Time/Retired	Grid
1	4	(Italy) Luigi Villoresi	Scuderia Ferrari	Ferrari 500	1:51:21.0, 123.99 km/h	2
2	14	(Argentina) José Froilán González	Officine Alfieri Maserati	Maserati A6GCM	+0.0s	4
3	8	(Italy) Sergio Sighinolfi (Italy) Alberto Ascari	Scuderia Ferrari	Ferrari 500	+28.6s	6
4	6	(Italy) Giuseppe Farina	Scuderia Ferrari	Ferrari 500	+1:38.8	3
5	10	(Switzerland) Rudi Fischer	Ecurie Espadon	Ferrari 500	+3 laps	10
6	30	(France) Élie Bayol	Élie Bayol	O.S.C.A. Tipo 20	+4 laps	8
7	18	(Uruguay) Eitel Cantoni	Escuderia Bandeirantes	Maserati A6GCM	+6 laps	12
8	34	(Italy) Piero Carini	HW Motors Ltd	HWM-Alta	+8 laps	9
9	12	(Germany) Hans Stuck	Ecurie Espadon	Ferrari 212	+10 laps	14
NC	26	(Belgium) Johnny Claes	Vicomtesse de Walckiers	Simca Gordini Type 15	+11 laps	16
Ret	28	(United Kingdom) Roy Salvadori	Leslie Hawthorn	Cooper T20-Bristol	66 laps, accident	15
Ret	20	(Brazil) Chico Landi	Escuderia Bandeirantes	Maserati A6GCM	44 laps	11
Ret	32	(United Kingdom) Lance Macklin	HW Motors Ltd	HWM-Alta	41 laps, transmission	13
Ret	22	(France) Robert Manzon	Equipe Gordini	Gordini Type 16	37 laps, ignition	5
Ret	2	(Italy) Alberto Ascari	Scuderia Ferrari	Ferrari 500	18 laps, oil system	1
Ret	24	(France) Jean Behra	Equipe Gordini	Gordini Type 16	9 laps, differential	7
DNS	16	(Italy) Felice Bonetto	Officine Alfieri Maserati	Maserati A6GCM	core plug	-
DNA	28	(United Kingdom) Mike Hawthorn	Leslie Hawthorn	Cooper T20-Bristol	practice crash, car raced by Salvadori	-

Previous race: 1952 Baule Grand Prix	Formula One non-championship races 1952 season	Next race: 1952 Circuit de Cadours
Previous race: 1951 Modena Grand Prix	Modena Grand Prix	Next race: 1953 Modena Grand Prix
