= Felice Maria Ferdinando Storelli =

Italian painter (1778 – 1854)

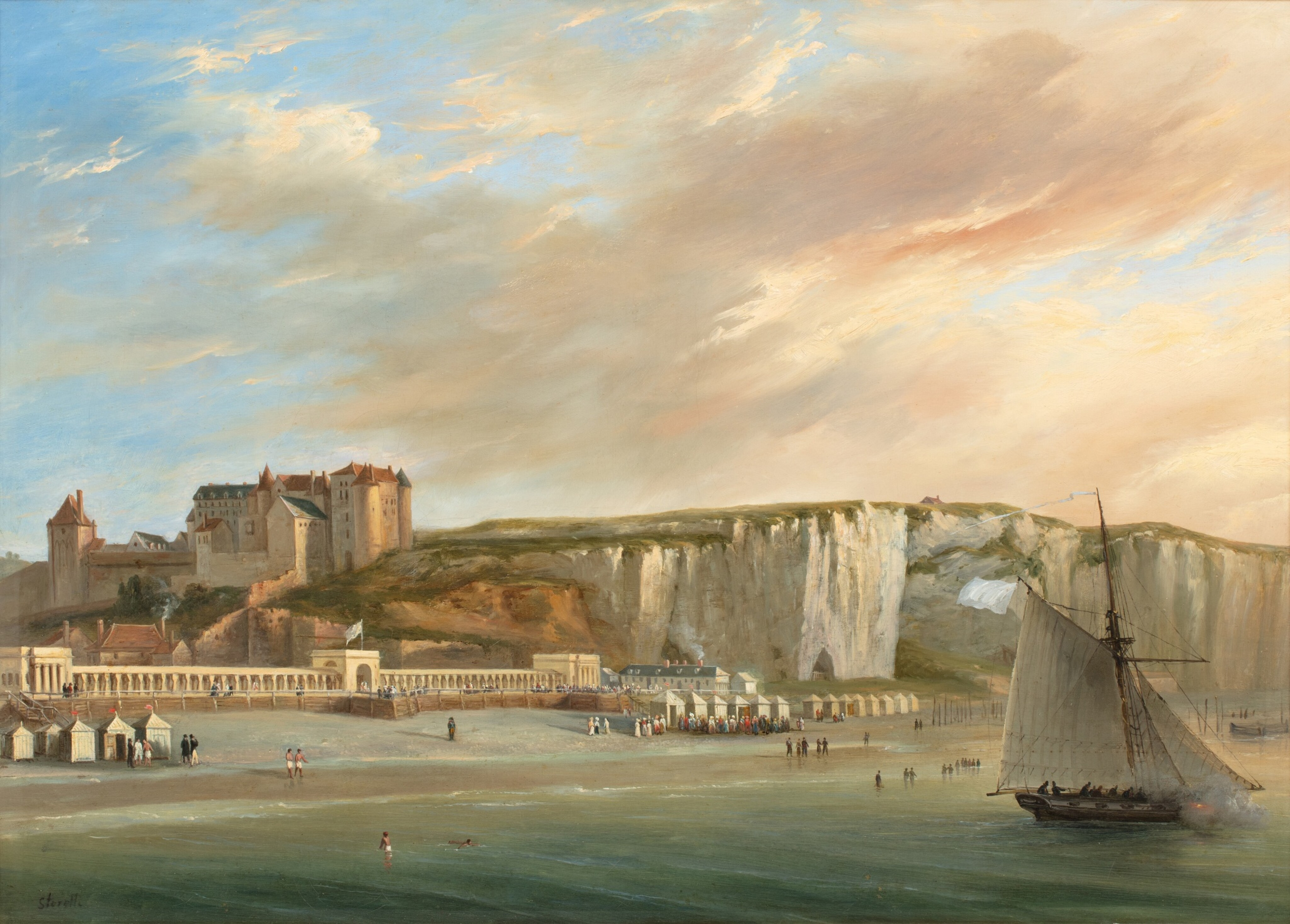

Felice Maria Ferdinando Storelli (1778 – 1854) was an Italian painter. He painted mainly vedute and landscapes.

== Biography ==
He was born in Turin. He apparently trained with the engraver and water color artist Pietro Palmieri. In 1800, he then moved to Paris, where by 1816 he found patronage with Marie Carolina de Berry. He was awarded a first class medal in the Paris Salon del 1825. In 1827, he was awarded the Legion of Honor. He painted a number of historical episodes, including battles, for the castello di Agliè and Palazzo Reale di Torino. His son was also a painter.
