= 1953 Modena Grand Prix =

Race details
- Date: 20 September 1953
- Official name: IV Gran Premio di Modena
- Location: Aerautodromo di Modena, Modena, Italy
- Course: Permanent racing facility
- Course length: 2.361 km (1.467 mi)
- Distance: 100 laps, 236.13 km (146.72 mi)

Pole position
Driver	(Argentina) Juan Manuel Fangio	Maserati
- Time: 1:06.2

Fastest lap
Driver	(Argentina) Juan Manuel Fangio	Maserati
- Time: 1:05.4

Podium
First	(Argentina) Juan Manuel Fangio	Maserati
Second	(Argentina) Onofre Marimón	Maserati
Third	(Switzerland) Emmanuel de Graffenried	Maserati

The 4th Gran Premio di Modena was a Formula Two motor race held on 20 September 1953 at the Aerautodromo di Modena, Italy. The race was run over 100 laps of the circuit, and was won by Argentinian driver Juan Manuel Fangio in a Maserati A6GCM. Fangio also qualified on pole and set fastest lap. His teammates Onofre Marimón and Emmanuel de Graffenried finished second and third.

The race meeting was marred by the death of Charles de Tornaco who rolled his Ferrari 500 during pre-race practice.

== Classification ==
Pos	No.	Driver	Entrant	Constructor	Time/Retired	Grid
1	24	(Argentina) Juan Manuel Fangio	Officine Alfieri Maserati	Maserati A6GCM	1:52:08.9, 123.32 km/h	1
2	26	(Argentina) Onofre Marimón	Officine Alfieri Maserati	Maserati A6GCM	+39.1s	2
3	28	(Switzerland) Emmanuel de Graffenried	Officine Alfieri Maserati	Maserati A6GCM	+2 laps	3
4	20	(France) Maurice Trintignant	Equipe Gordini	Gordini Type 16	+4 laps	6
NC	32	(Monaco) Louis Chiron	Louis Chiron	O.S.C.A. Tipo 20	+12 laps	10
NC	18	(United States) Harry Schell	Equipe Gordini	Gordini Type 16	+13 laps, engine	11
NC	30	(Italy) Felice Bonetto	Officine Alfieri Maserati	Maserati A6GCM	+23 laps, differential	4
NC	34	(Italy) Emilio Giletti	Emilio Giletti	Maserati A6GCM	+32 laps, valve	8
NC	2	(Belgium) Johnny Claes	Ecurie Belge	Connaught Type A-Lea Francis	+34 laps	13
NC	6	(United Kingdom) Kenneth McAlpine	Connaught Engineering	Connaught Type A-Lea Francis	+37 laps	9
Ret.	4	(United Kingdom) John Coombs (United Kingdom) Roy Salvadori	Connaught Engineering	Connaught Type A-Lea Francis	35 laps	7
Ret.	8	(United Kingdom) Roy Salvadori	Connaught Engineering	Connaught Type A-Lea Francis	10 laps, engine	5
Ret.	22	(France) Jean Behra	Equipe Gordini	Gordini Type 16	1 lap, piston	12
DNS	16	(Belgium) Charles de Tornaco	Ecurie Francorchamps	Ferrari 500	Fatal accident in practice	-
DNA	10		Scuderia Ferrari	Ferrari 500	Withdrawn, boycotted race	-
DNA	12		Scuderia Ferrari	Ferrari 500	Withdrawn, boycotted race	-
DNA	14		Scuderia Ferrari	Ferrari 500	Withdrawn, boycotted race	-

Previous race: 1953 London Trophy	Formula One non-championship races 1953 season	Next race: 1953 Madgwick Cup
Previous race: 1952 Modena Grand Prix	Modena Grand Prix	Next race: 1957 Modena Grand Prix
