= Franco Meloni =

Italian racing driver

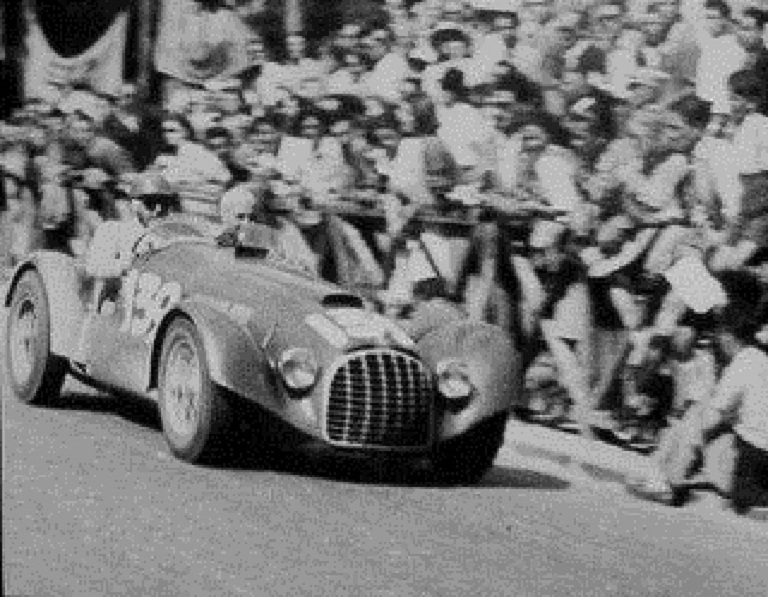
Franco Meloni, co-driving a Ferrari in 1949 along with Robert Vallone

Franco Meloni is a former Italian racing driver. He entered eight races between 1949 and 1954, of which he drove five in a Ferrari.

== Complete results ==
Year	Date	Race	Car	Teammate	Result
1949	June 29	Giro dell'Umbria	Ferrari 166 SC	Roberto Vallone	1st
1949	July 17	Coppa d'Oro delle Dolomiti	Ferrari 166 SC	Roberto Vallone	1st
1950	April 23	Mille Miglia	Maserati A6GCS	Pietro Palmieri	47th
1951	April 29	Mille Miglia	Ferrari 166 Inter	Augusto Caraceni	DNS
1951	April 29	Mille Miglia	Lancia Aurelia	Roberto Vallone	25th
1952	May 4	Mille Miglia	Ferrari 225 Export	Augusto Caraceni	DNF
1954	April 4	Giro di Sicilia	Fiat 1100/103 TV	"R. Mancini"	17th
1954	July 25	10 Hours of Messina	Ferrari 250 MM	Vittorio Colocci	2nd (1st in class)
