= Augusto Caraceni =

Italian racing driver

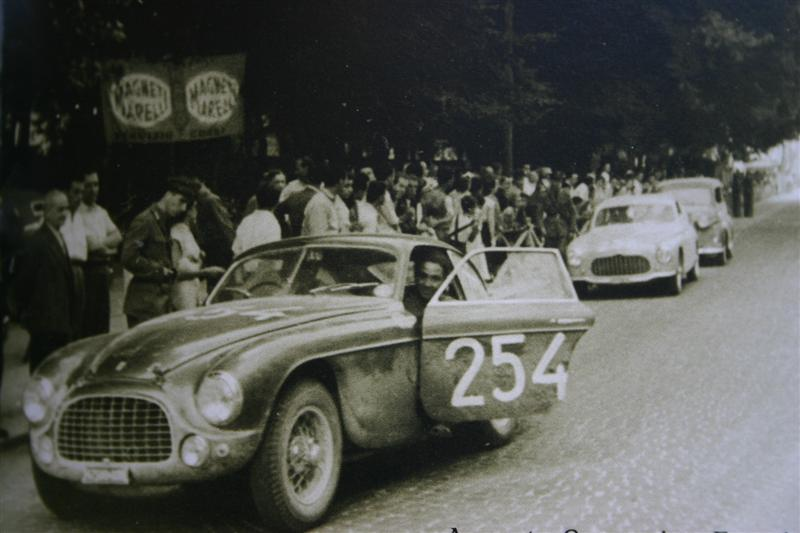
Caraceni with his 1951 Ferrari 212 Export Touring Berlinetta in 1951

Dr. Augusto Caraceni is a former Italian racing driver. He entered four races between 1951 and 1958. Caraceni was the son of Domenico Caraceni, founder of Caraceni, a Rome-based tailor whose clientele included Humphrey Bogart and Aristotle Onassis. He was named after his uncle, Augusto Caraceni, who opened the Paris branch of the Caraceni tailors.

== Results ==
Year	Date	Race	Car	Teammate	Result
1951	April 29	Mille Miglia	Ferrari 166 Inter	Franco Meloni	DNS
1952	May 4	Mille Miglia	Ferrari 225 S	Franco Meloni	DNF
1953	May 31	Coppa della Toscana	Lancia	Paolo Fontana	23rd
1958	September 7	Coppa Inter-Europa	Ferrari 250 GT	none	-
