= 1957 Modena Grand Prix =

- Non-championship race in the 1957 Formula One season
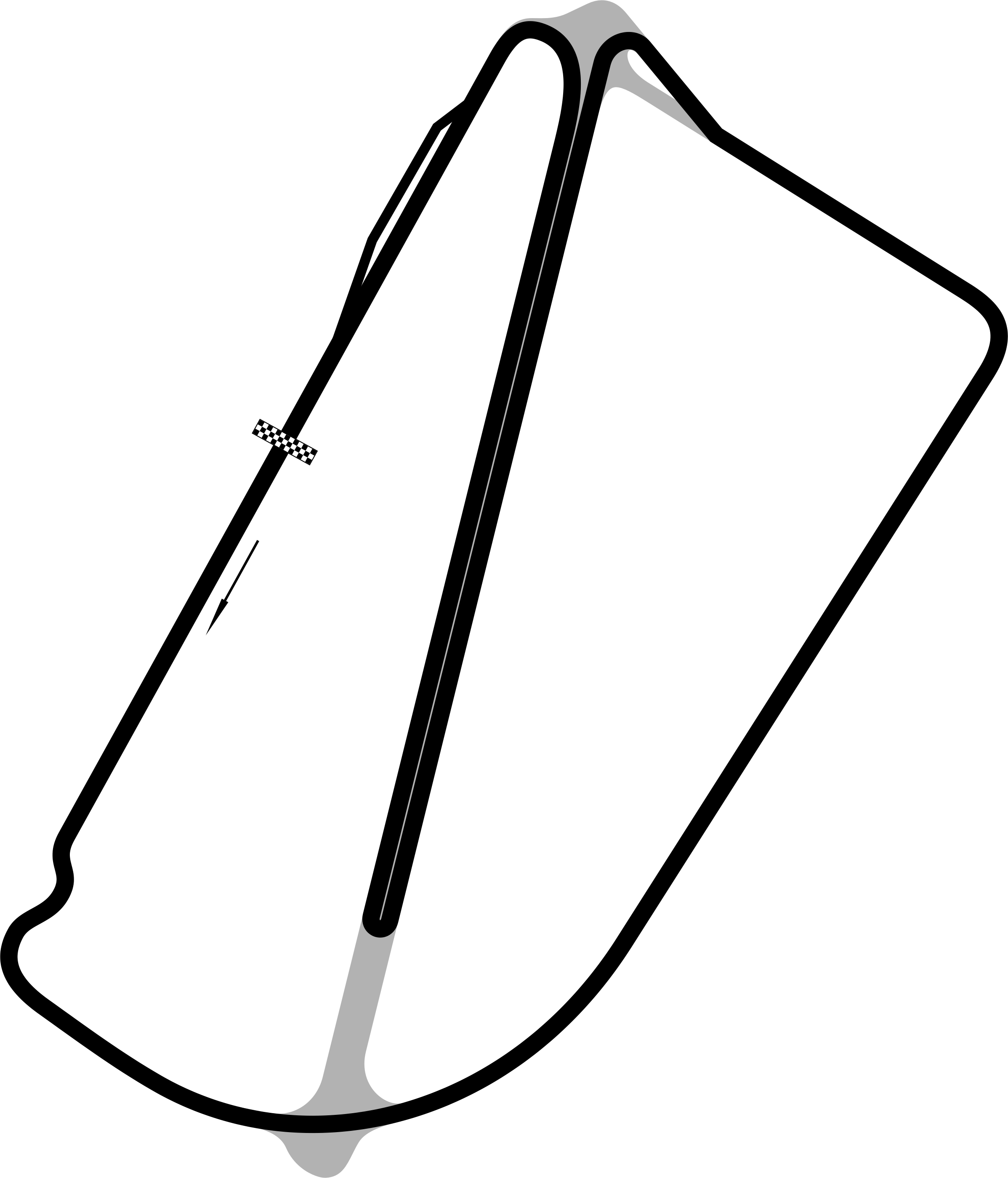

Race details
- Date: 22 September 1957
- Official name: V Gran Premio di Modena
- Location: Aerautodromo di Modena, Modena, Italy
- Course: Permanent racing facility
- Course length: 2.37 km (1.47 miles)
- Distance: Aggregate of 2 x 40 lap heats = 80 laps, 189.60 km (117.60 miles)

Pole position
Driver	(France) Jean Behra	Maserati

Fastest lap
Drivers	(Italy) Luigi Musso	Ferrari
	(France) Jean Behra	Maserati
- Time: 1:02.2

Podium
First	(France) Jean Behra	Maserati
Second	(Italy) Luigi Musso	Ferrari
Third	(United States) Harry Schell	Maserati

The 5th Modena Grand Prix was a motor race, run to Formula One rules, held on 22 September 1957 at Aerautodromo di Modena, Modena, Italy. The race was run over two 40 lap heats of the circuit, taking the aggregate of the results, and was won by French driver Jean Behra in a Maserati 250F.

This race, and the 1961 race, were the only two Modena Grands Prix run under Formula One rules.

== Results ==
Pos	No.	Driver	Entrant	Constructor	Time/Retired
1	4	(France) Jean Behra	Officine Alfieri Maserati	Maserati 250F	1h 24m 47.9s, 130.51 km/h
2	26	(Italy) Luigi Musso	Scuderia Ferrari	Ferrari Dino 156 F2	1h 25m 28.2s (+40.3s)
3	6	(United States) Harry Schell	Officine Alfieri Maserati	Maserati 250F	1h 25m 56.8s (+1m 8.9s)
4	28	(United Kingdom) Peter Collins	Scuderia Ferrari	Ferrari Dino 156 F2	1h 26m 5.8s (+1m 17.9s)
5	8	(Italy) Giorgio Scarlatti	Officine Alfieri Maserati	Maserati 250F	78 laps
6	20	(United Kingdom) Horace Gould	Horace Gould	Maserati 250F	75 laps
7	22	(United Kingdom) Bruce Halford	Bruce Halford	Maserati 250F	71 laps
Ret.	12	(Sweden) Jo Bonnier	Owen Racing Organisation	BRM P25	26 laps (heat 2) - universal joint
Ret.	10	(United Kingdom) Ron Flockhart	Owen Racing Organisation	BRM P25	22 laps (heat 2) - fuel pump drive
Ret.	30	(United Kingdom) Colin Davis	Horace Gould	Maserati 250F	7 laps (heat 1) - engine
DNA	2	(Argentina) Juan Manuel Fangio	Officine Alfieri Maserati	Maserati 250F	
DNA	14	(United Kingdom) Roy Salvadori	Cooper Car Company	Cooper T43-Climax	
DNA	16	(Sweden) Jo Bonnier	Scuderia Centro Sud	Maserati 250F	Drove car number 12
DNA	18	(United States) Masten Gregory	Scuderia Centro Sud	Maserati 250F	
DNA	2	(United Kingdom) Charles Houghton	Charles Houghton	Maserati 250F	

Previous race: 1957 BRDC International Trophy	Formula One non-championship races 1957 season	Next race: 1957 Moroccan Grand Prix
Previous race: 1953 Modena Grand Prix	Modena Grand Prix	Next race: 1961 Modena Grand Prix
