= 1961 Modena Grand Prix =

- Non-championship race in the 1961 Formula One season
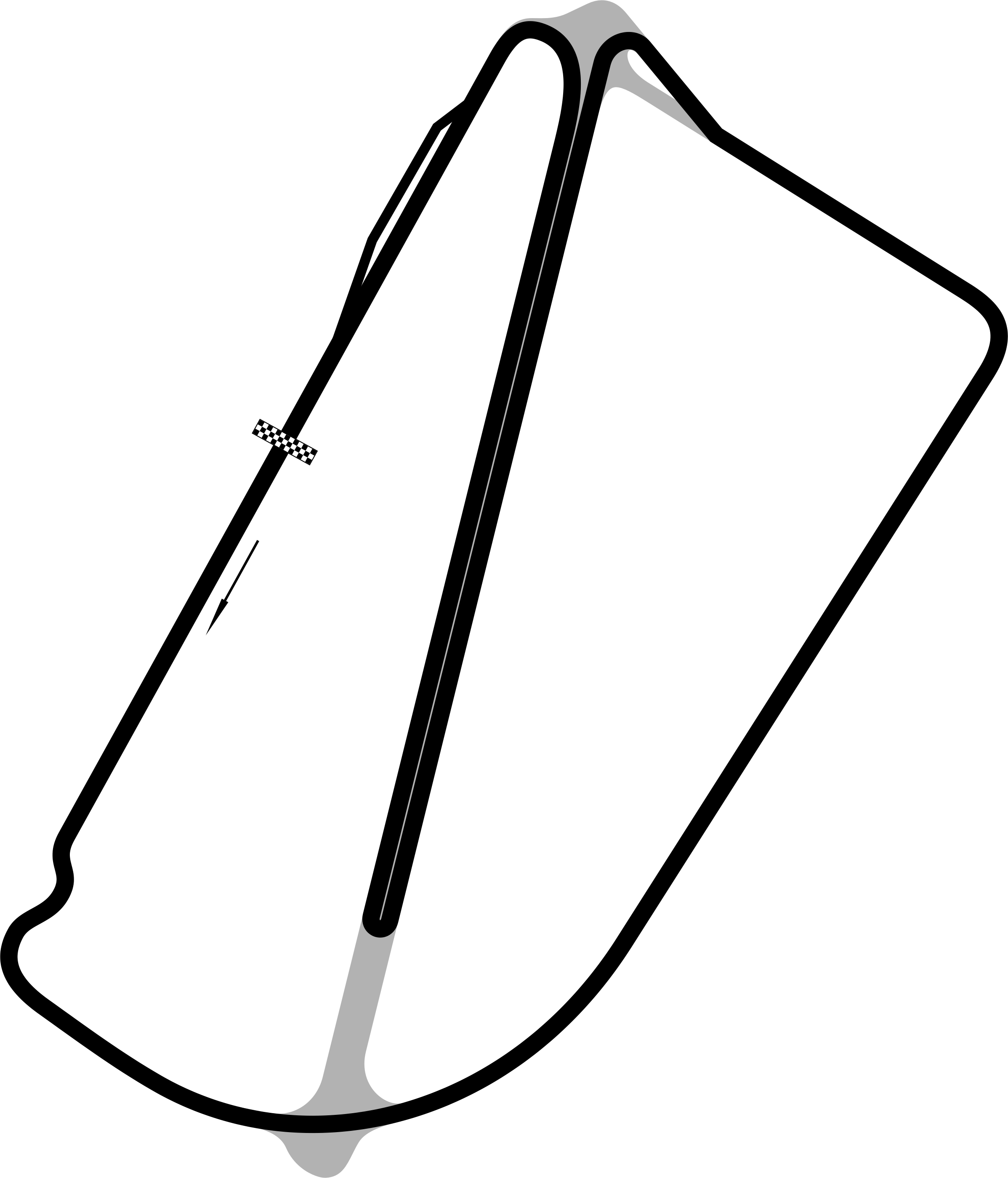

Race details
- Date: 3 September 1961
- Official name: VII Gran Premio di Modena
- Location: Modena Autodrome, Modena
- Course: Permanent racing facility
- Course length: 2.366 km (1.4702 miles)
- Distance: 100 laps, 236.61 km (147.02 miles)

Pole position
Driver	(United Kingdom) Stirling Moss	Lotus-Climax
- Time: 0:58.6

Fastest lap
Driver	(United Kingdom) Stirling Moss	Lotus-Climax
- Time: 0:59.2

Podium
First	(United Kingdom) Stirling Moss	Lotus-Climax
Second	(Sweden) Jo Bonnier	Porsche
Third	(United States) Dan Gurney	Porsche

The 7th Modena Grand Prix was a non-championship motor race, run for cars complying with Formula One rules, held on 3 September 1961 at Modena Autodrome, Italy. The race was run over 100 laps of the circuit, and was dominated by British driver Stirling Moss in a Lotus 18/21.

The qualifying system for this event was very unusual in that despite over 30 entrants, the starting grid was restricted to only 14 cars. Furthermore, the fastest three Italian drivers in practice would be guaranteed to start the race, regardless of how many other drivers were faster. This resulted in Innes Ireland failing to qualify despite being 13th fastest, and faster than Giorgio Scarlatti who did qualify.

Moss took pole position, fastest lap and the win, finishing a few seconds ahead of the Porsche pairing of Jo Bonnier and Dan Gurney. Gurney led at the start, but Moss passed him on lap 11 and stayed in front.

== Qualifying ==
Pos	No.	Driver	Constructor	Time	Gap
1	26	(United Kingdom) Stirling Moss	Lotus-Climax	0:58.6	-
2	10	(Sweden) Jo Bonnier	Porsche	0:59.0	+ 0.4
3	12	(United States) Dan Gurney	Porsche	0:59.0	+ 0.4
4	62	(United Kingdom) Graham Hill	BRM-Climax	0:59.3	+ 0.7
5	46	(United Kingdom) Roy Salvadori	Cooper-Climax	0:59.4	+ 0.8
6	14	(United Kingdom) Jim Clark	Lotus-Climax	0:59.6	+ 1.0
7	32	(United States) Masten Gregory	Lotus-Climax	0:59.7	+ 1.1
8	4	(Italy) Lorenzo Bandini	Cooper-Maserati	0:59.8	+ 1.2
9	44	(United Kingdom) John Surtees	Cooper-Climax	0:59.8	+ 1.2
10	36	(Australia) Jack Brabham	Cooper-Climax	0:59.8	+ 1.2
11	64	(United Kingdom) Tony Brooks	BRM-Climax	1:00.0	+ 1.4
12	30	(United Kingdom) Henry Taylor	Lotus-Climax	1:00.1	+ 1.5
13	16	(United Kingdom) Innes Ireland	Lotus-Climax	1:00.2	+ 1.6
14	42	(Italy) Roberto Bussinello	De Tomaso-Alfa Romeo	1:00.4	+ 1.8
15	24	(Germany) Wolfgang Seidel	Lotus-Climax	1:00.4	+ 1.8
16	50	(France) Maurice Trintignant	Cooper-Maserati	1:00.6	+ 2.0
17	66	(Belgium) Mauro Bianchi	Emeryson-Maserati	1:01.2	+ 2.6
18	34	(Netherlands) Carel Godin de Beaufort	Porsche	1:01.2	+ 2.6
19	18	(Italy) Giorgio Scarlatti	Lotus-Maserati	1:01.6	+ 3.0
20	48	(United Kingdom) Tim Parnell	Lotus-Climax	1:01.7	+ 3.1
21	52	(Italy) Nino Vaccarella	De Tomaso-Alfa Romeo	1:02.0	+ 3.4
22	28	(Italy) Menato Boffa	Cooper-Climax	1:02.1	+ 3.5
23	56	(Italy) Roberto Lippi	De Tomaso-O.S.C.A	1:02.9	+ 4.3
24	18	(Italy) Gaetano Starrabba	Lotus-Maserati	1:03.0	+ 4.4
25	20	(Italy) Renato Pirocchi	Cooper-Maserati	1:03.3	+ 4.7
26	22	(Italy) Gastone Zanarotti	De Tomaso-O.S.C.A	1:03.3	+ 4.7
27	8	(United Kingdom) Jackie Lewis	Cooper-Climax	1:05.8	+ 7.2
28	60	(Switzerland) "Wal Ever"	Cooper-O.S.C.A.	1:06.4	+ 7.8

== Results ==
Pos	No.	Driver	Entrant	Constructor	Laps	Time/Retired	Grid
1	26	(United Kingdom) Stirling Moss	Rob Walker Racing Team	Lotus-Climax	100	1.40:08.1	1
2	10	(Sweden) Jo Bonnier	Porsche System Engineering	Porsche	100	+ 7.0 s	2
3	12	(United States) Dan Gurney	Porsche System Engineering	Porsche	100	+ 7.3 s	3
4	14	(United Kingdom) Jim Clark	Team Lotus	Lotus-Climax	99		6
5	36	(Australia) Jack Brabham	Jack Brabham	Cooper-Climax	99		10
6	64	(United Kingdom) Tony Brooks	Owen Racing Organisation	BRM-Climax	99		11
7	62	(United Kingdom) Graham Hill	Owen Racing Organisation	BRM-Climax	99		4
Ret	4	(Italy) Lorenzo Bandini	Scuderia Centro Sud	Cooper-Maserati	92	Con-rod	8
Ret	42	(Italy) Roberto Bussinello	Isobele de Tomaso	De Tomaso-Alfa Romeo	75	Oil pressure	13
Ret	46	(United Kingdom) Roy Salvadori	Yeoman Credit Racing Team	Cooper-Climax	74	Engine	5
NC	32	(United States) Masten Gregory	UDT Laystall Racing Team	Lotus-Climax	71		7
Ret	30	(United Kingdom) Henry Taylor	UDT Laystall Racing Team	Lotus-Climax	42	Cylinder head gasket	12
Ret	44	(United Kingdom) John Surtees	Yeoman Credit Racing Team	Cooper-Climax	25	Engine	9
Ret	18	(Italy) Giorgio Scarlatti	Gaetano Starrabba	Lotus-Maserati	4	Engine	14
DNQ	16	(United Kingdom) Innes Ireland	Team Lotus	Lotus-Climax			-
DNQ	24	(Germany) Wolfgang Seidel	Scuderia Colonia	Lotus-Climax			-
DNQ	50	(France) Maurice Trintignant	Scuderia Serenissima	Cooper-Maserati			-
DNQ	66	(Belgium) Mauro Bianchi	Equipe Nationale Belge	Emeryson-Maserati			-
DNQ	34	(Netherlands) Carel Godin de Beaufort	Ecurie Maarsbergen	Porsche			-
DNQ	48	(United Kingdom) Tim Parnell	Tim Parnell	Lotus-Climax			-
DNQ	52	(Italy) Nino Vaccarella	Scuderia Serenissima	De Tomaso-Alfa Romeo			-
DNQ	28	(Italy) Menato Boffa	Menato Boffa	Cooper-Climax			-
DNQ	56	(Italy) Roberto Lippi	Scuderia Settecolli	De Tomaso-O.S.C.A			-
DNQ	18	(Italy) Gaetano Starrabba	Gaetano Starrabba	Lotus-Maserati			-
DNQ	20	(Italy) Renato Pirocchi	Pescara Racing Club	Cooper-Maserati			-
DNQ	22	(Italy) Gastone Zanarotti	Isobele de Tomaso	De Tomaso-O.S.C.A			-
DNQ	8	(United Kingdom) Jackie Lewis	H & L Motors	Cooper-Climax			-
DNQ	60	(Switzerland) "Wal Ever"	"Wal Ever"	Cooper-O.S.C.A.			-
WD	2	(Belgium) André Pilette	Equipe Nationale Belge	Emeryson-Maserati			-
WD	38	(United Kingdom) John Campbell-Jones	John Campbell-Jones	Cooper-Climax		Driver injured	-
WD	40	(United Kingdom) Ian Burgess	Camoradi International	Lotus-Climax		Car not ready	-
WD	54	(United Kingdom) Brian Naylor	JBW Cars	JBW-Climax			-
WD	58	(Italy) Ernesto Prinoth	Scuderia Dolomiti	Lotus-Climax		Car not ready	-

- Scarlatti and Starrabba used the same car.
- Scuderia Centro Sud entered a Cooper-Maserati, given #6, but withdrew the entry.

== Bibliography ==
- "The Grand Prix Who's Who", Steve Small, 1995.
- "The Formula One Record Book", John Thompson, 1974.

== See also ==
- 1957 Modena Grand Prix

Previous race: 1961 Danish Grand Prix	Formula One non-championship races 1961 season	Next race: 1961 Flugplatzrennen
Previous race: 1960 Modena Grand Prix	Modena Grand Prix	Next race: —
