= Ferrari 212 F2 =

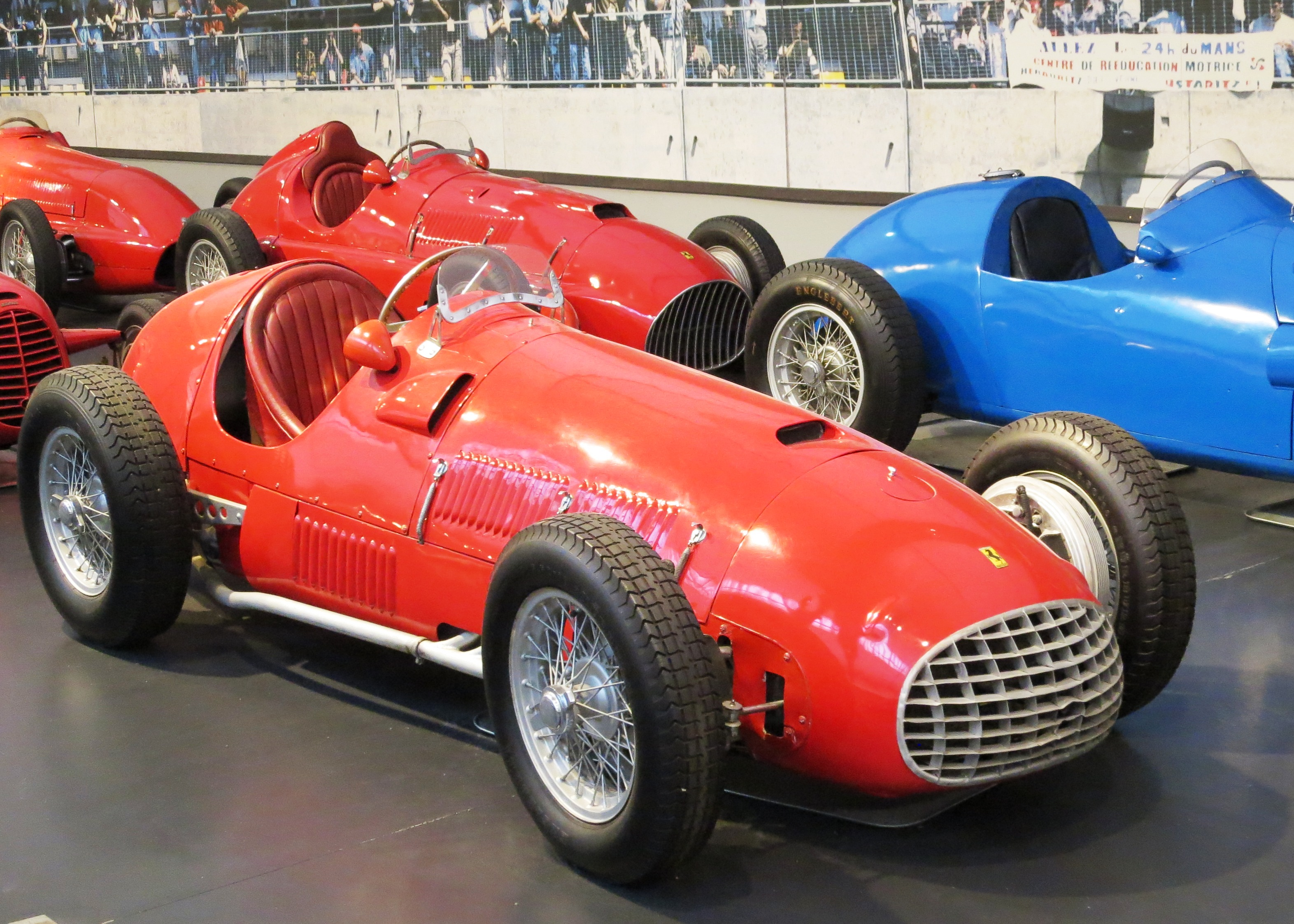
Ferrari 212 F2

The Ferrari 212 F2 was an open-wheel Formula 2 race car, designed, developed, built, and entered by Italian racing team Scuderia Ferrari, in 1951.

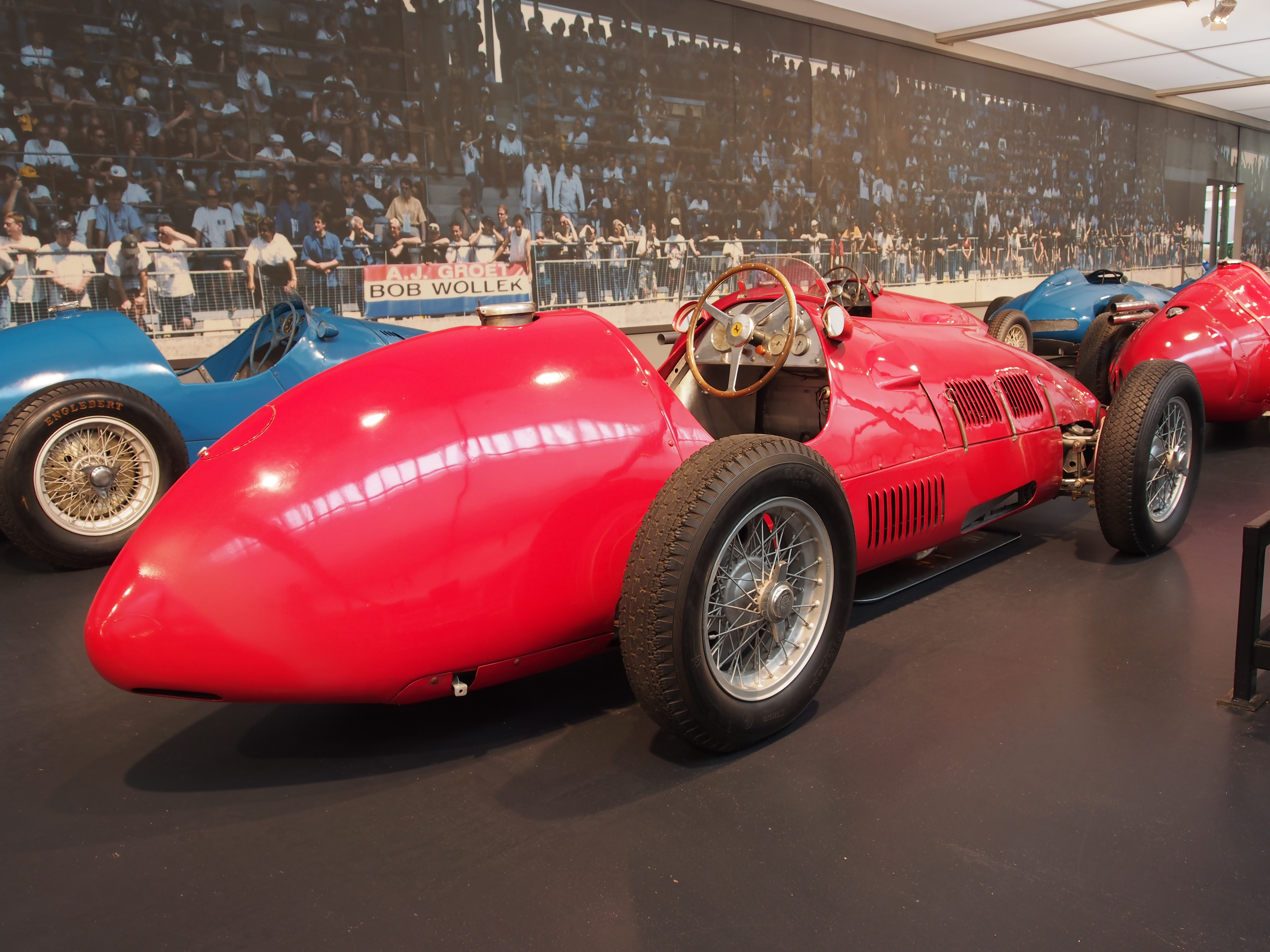
Ferrari 212 F2 rear-view

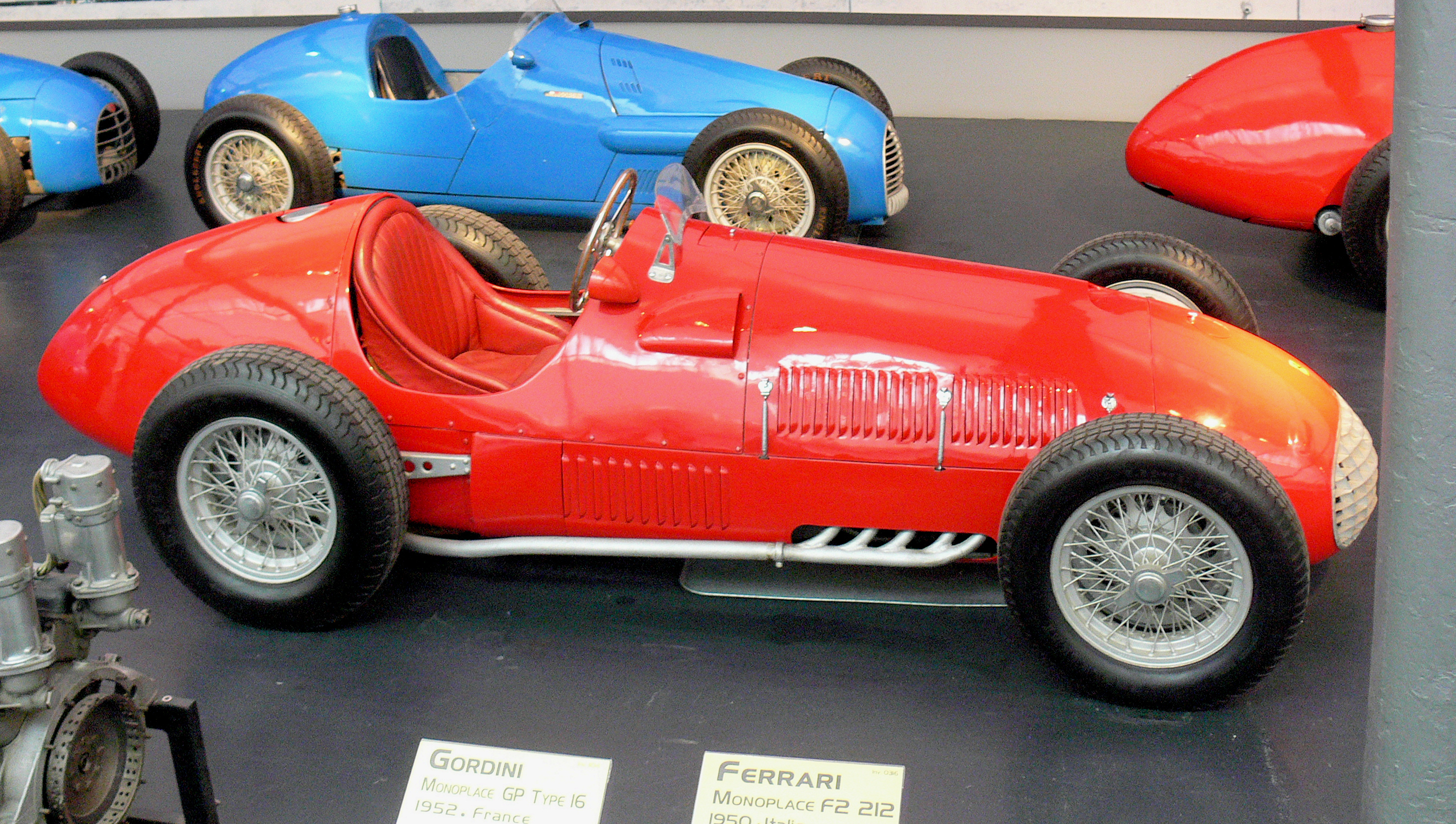
Ferrari 212 F2 side view

== Development ==
The Ferrari 212 F2 was a simplified Ferrari 166 and Ferrari's first Formula Two racing car before the Ferrari 500. The V12 engine was built into the space frame of the Ferrari 125. The supercharged version was raced in the 1949 Argentine Formula Libre.

In 1950, the car was revised. Aurelio Lampredi revised the engine, and the car got a longer wheelbase and improved mechanics. [1]

== Racing history ==
The works cars dominated Formula Two racing for the 1950 season. In 1951, as the Scuderia turned its attention to the new Formula One race cars, the 275 F1, 340 F1, and 375 F1 models, the cars were sold to privateers. Above all, the Swiss Ecurie Espadon used them under the designation 212 F1 for drivers such as Rudolf Fischer and Rudolf Schoeller in the Drivers' World Championship.
