= Anna Maria Peduzzi =

Italian racecar driver

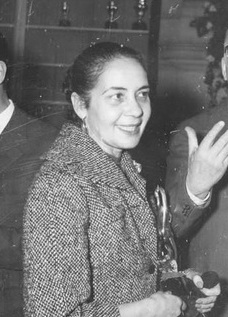
Peduzzi in 1956

Anna Maria Peduzzi (12 July 1912 – 23 August 1979) was an Italian racecar driver. She raced from the 1930s to the 1950s, mostly in her native Italy. She is the first driver on record to have raced for Scuderia Ferrari. During her career, she also raced for Alfa Romeo, Stanguellini and Fiat.

== Biography ==
Peduzzi was born in Olgiate Comasco, a small town close to Milan. In 1934 she married race car test driver Franco Comotti from Bergamo. In 1933 she bought an Alfa Romeo 6C 1500 Gran Sport Testa fissa which she raced alone and occasionally with her husband, such as when they drove for Ferrari in the 1934 Mille Miglia, winning the 1.5 litre class and finishing 13rd overall.

As ardent anti-fascists, Peduzzi and Comotti ended up having troubles with Benito Mussolini. The couple relocated to Paris in 1936 where they made their home until the end of World War II in 1945. During this period she suffered from polio.

Following the end of the War, Peduzzi reprised her racing career. From 1952 to 1956 she raced Stanguellini 750 cc race cars. From 1956 to 1959, she mainly raced a 2-litre Ferrari 500 TR, initially teaming-up with Belgian driver Gilberte Thiroin.
