= Maserati A6GCM =

Single seater racing car

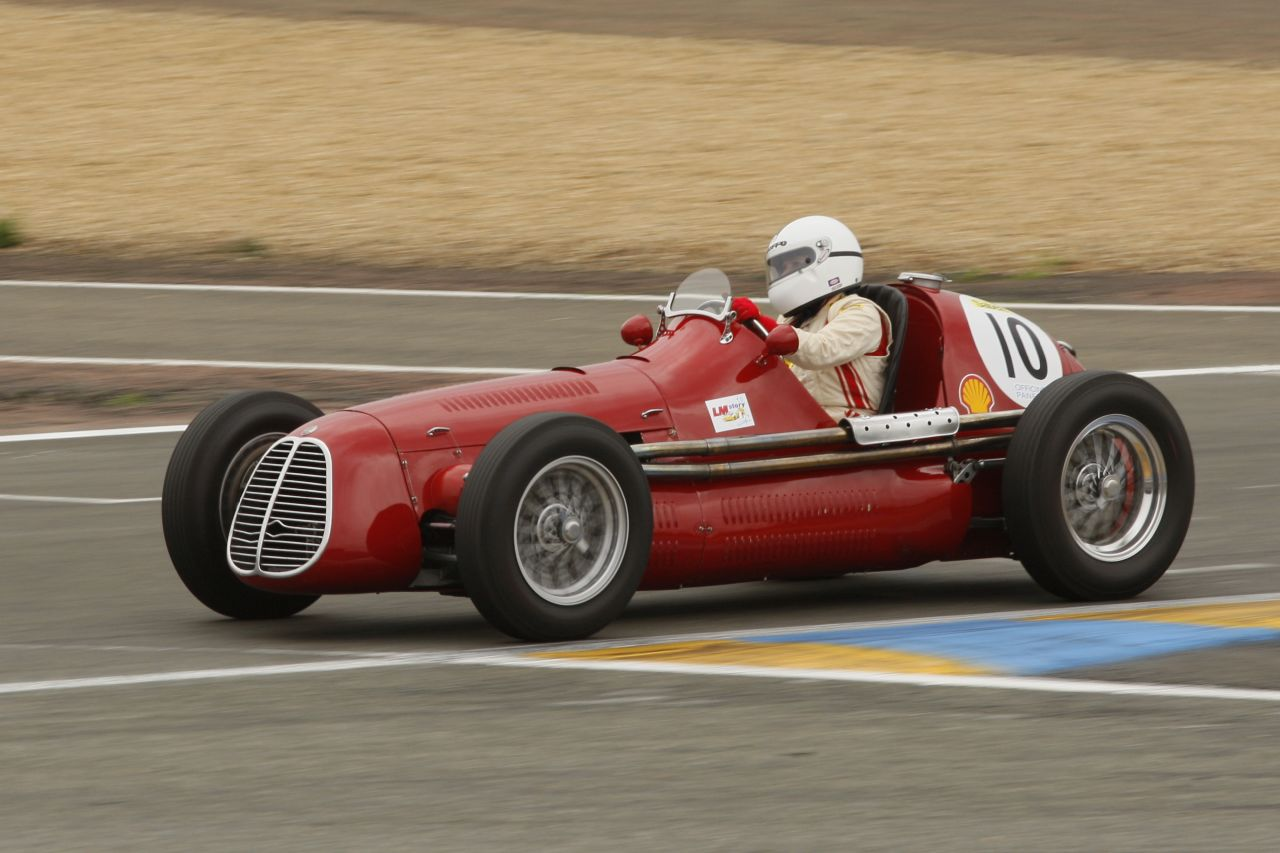
- Production: 1951-1953
- Predecessor: Maserati 4CLT; Maserati 8CLT
- Successor: Maserati 250F

Technical specifications
- Suspension (front): Coil springs combined with Houdaille shock absorbers
- Suspension (rear): Cantilevered leaf springs combined with Houdaille shock absorbers
- Engine: Maserati 2.0 L inline-6-cylinder two-liter engine with DOHC and 12 valves, 3 two-barrel (twin choke) Weber carburetors
- Transmission: Maserati 4-speed manual
- Weight: 550–570 kg (1,210–1,260 lb)

Competition history

The Maserati A6GCM is a single seater racing car from the Italian manufacturer Maserati. Developed for Formula Two, 12 cars were built between 1951 and 1953.

== Introduction ==
The A6GCM belongs to the A6 family of Maserati vehicles which comprised many models from street cars to racing cars. The name of the car is derived as follows:

A6 : the name of the series : A for Alfieri (Maserati), 6 for 6 cylinders

G : Ghisa, the engine block was in cast iron

C : Corsa, for Racing

M : Monoposto, for single seater.

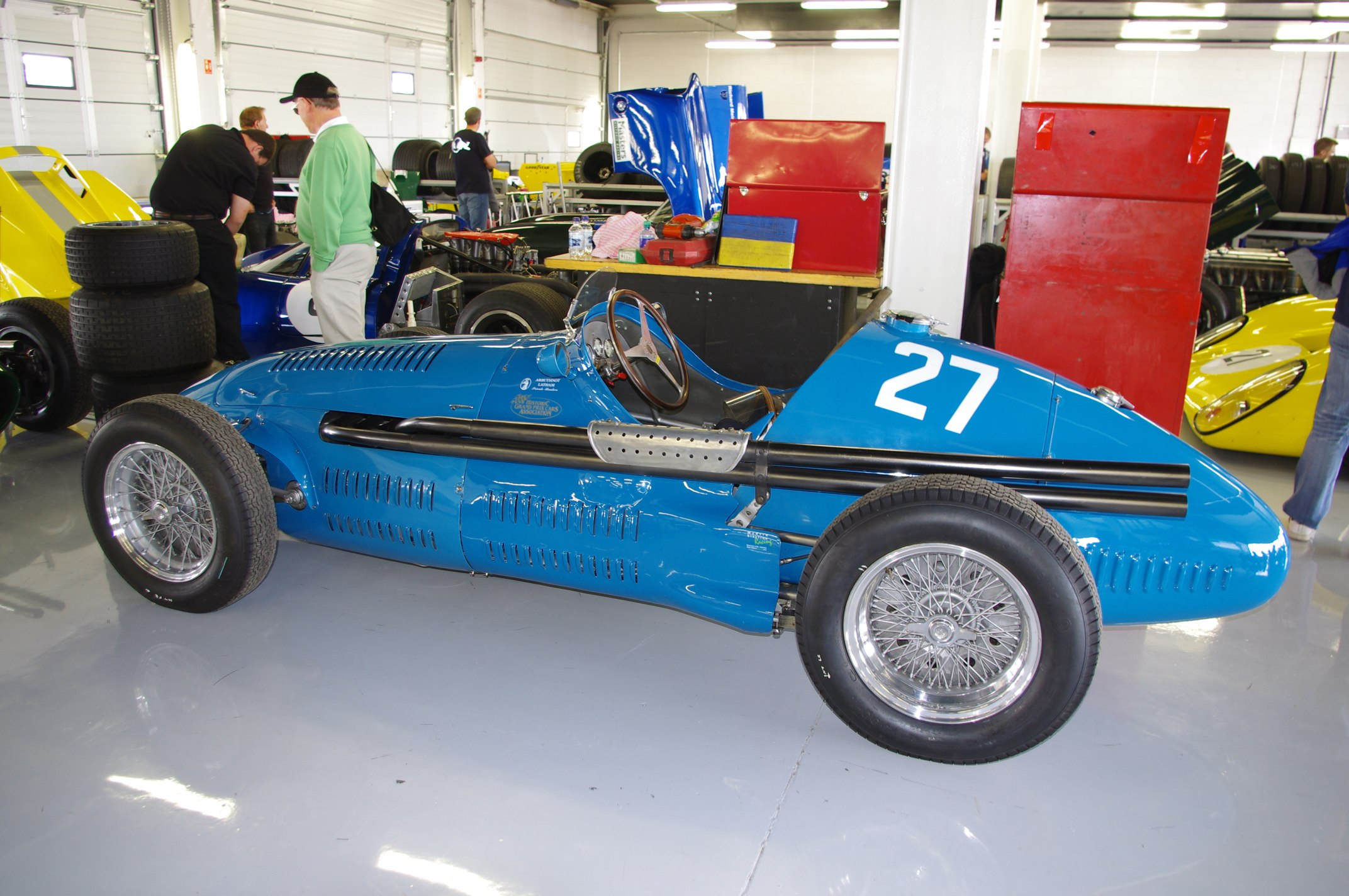
Maserati A6GCM at Silverstone Classic 2011

The Tipo6 CS (Corsa Sportivo: barchetta) has been spotted as a good contender even in front of single seaters in Formula 2, despite its small engine. Thus Maserati decided to develop a specific model that would meet the new FIA racing rules.

== Design ==
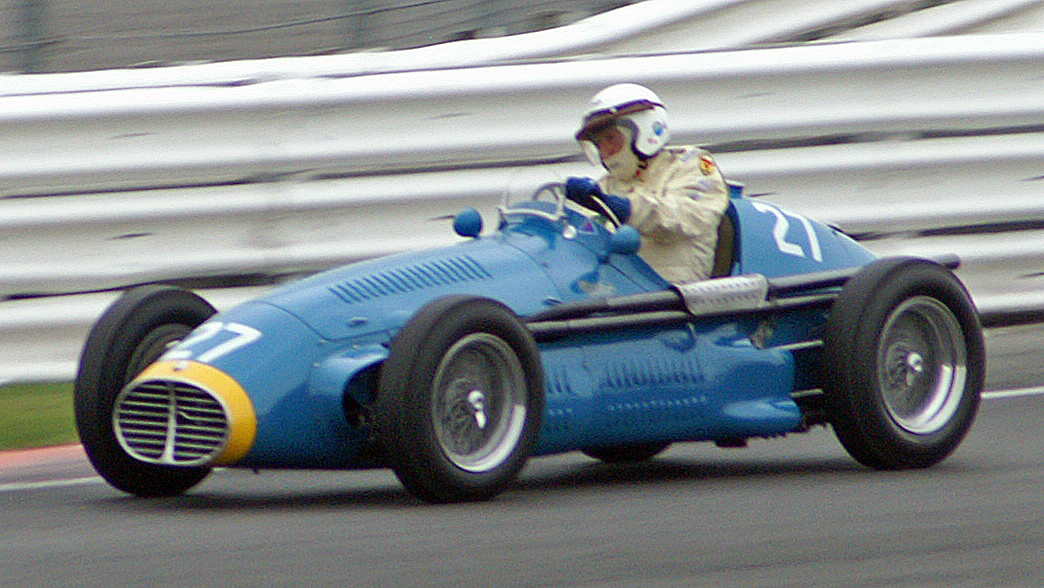
1953 Maserati A6GCM

The inline 6-cylinder two-liter engine with DOHC and 12 valves, 3 two-barrel (twin choke) Weber carburetors delivered 160 hp (120 kW) to 197 hp (147 kW). It was developed by Alberto Massimino and Vittorio Bellentani.

- Initially with a 1,987 cc (121.3 cu in) capacity (72.6 mm × 80 mm (2.86 in × 3.15 in), with a compression ratio of 13.5 :1) delivering 160 hp (120 kW), in 1951 and 1952
- Then 1,988 cc (121.3 cu in) capacity (75 mm × 75 mm (2.95 in × 2.95 in), with a compression ratio of 13.5 :1, with twin ignition) delivering 180 hp (130 kW), in late 1952
- And finally with a 1,970 cc (120 cu in) capacity 76.2 mm × 72 mm (3.00 in × 2.83 in), with a compression ratio of 12 :1, with twin ignition) delivering 197 hp (147 kW), in 1953.

The engine was mated to a 4-speed gearbox. The frame was developed by Medardo Fantuzzi. The car was bodied in aluminum and weighed 550–570 kg (1,210–1,260 lb), depending on the engine installed. The rigid rear axle employed cantilevered leaf springs combined with Houdaille shock absorbers; in front, coil springs are used also combined with Houdaille shock absorbers. The brakes are hydraulic driven drums. The initial wheelbase was 2,280 mm (90 in); this was extended to 2,310 mm (91 in) in the later version. The front track was initially 1,278 mm (50.3 in) and was reduced to 1,200 mm (47 in) as the car received larger wheels in its later version. The rear track received the same treatment going from 1,225 mm (48.2 in) to 1,160 mm (46 in). The spoked wheels were initially 4 in × 15 in (100 mm × 380 mm), replaced by 5 in × 16 in (127.000 mm × 406.400 mm), in 1953.

== Evolution ==
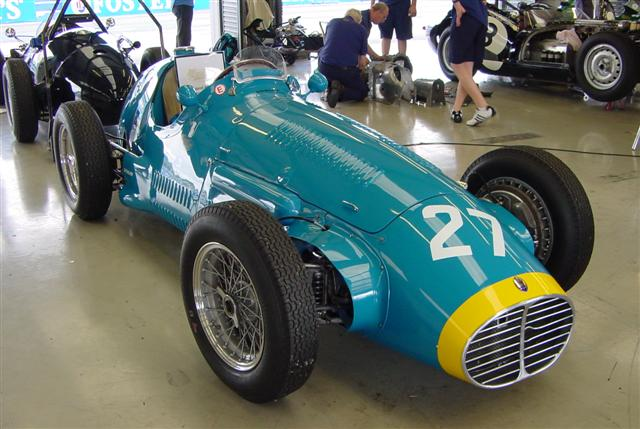
Maserati A6GCM "interim" or A6SSG wearing the Siam racing colors, those of Prince Bira

The 1953 version was the work of Gioacchino Colombo who modified the car significantly: now with a nearly 200 hp (150 kW) engine, new suspension and improved brakes. The body was also reworked and made narrower and the car received an oval front grille. This version is known as the "interim" A6GCM or A6SSG.

The A6GCM foreshadowed the next model: the 250F. In fact several of the later A6GCMs, produced in late 1952 and 1953, were converted to 250Fs in 1954.

== Results ==
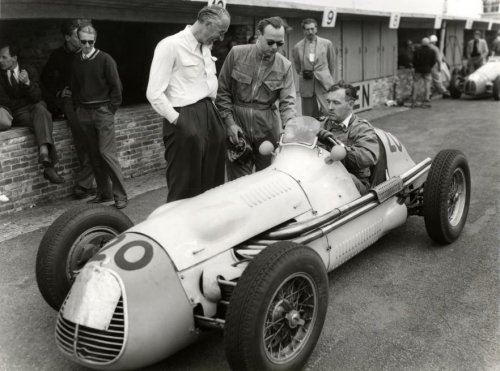
A6GCM of Jan Flinterman at the 1952 Dutch Grand Prix

The same model raced in Formula One races and in Formula Two, in races which counted for the World Championship as well as in non-championship events, as it was often the case in the early 1950s.

The A6GCM achieved 151 race starts, 81 race finishes, 23 podiums, and 6 Grand Prix victories, demonstrating a strong track record with the support of skilled drivers.

Note: when Maserati competed in its home town, Modena, in 1953, it managed to finish in the top three positions.

=== Podium finishes ===
Class	Date	Race	Driver	Position	Team
World Championship F2	9/1952	23rd Gran Premio d´Italia	José Froilán González	2	Officine Alfieri Maserati
World Championship F2	1/1953	1st Gran Premio de la Rep. Argentina	José Froilán González	3	Officine Alfieri Maserati
World Championship F2	6/1953	4th Grote Prijs van Nederland	Felice Bonetto	3	Officine Alfieri Maserati
World Championship F2	6/1953	15th Grand Prix de Belgique	Onofre Marimón	3	Officine Alfieri Maserati
World Championship F2	7/1953	11th Grand Prix de l´ACF	Juan Manuel Fangio	2	Officine Alfieri Maserati
World Championship F2	7/1953	11th Grand Prix de l´ACF	José Froilán González	3	Officine Alfieri Maserati
World Championship F2	7/1953	6 RAC British Grand Prix	Juan Manuel Fangio	2	Officine Alfieri Maserati
World Championship F2	8/1953	16th Grosser Preis von Deutschland	Juan Manuel Fangio	2	Officine Alfieri Maserati
World Championship F2	9/1953	24th Gran Premio d´Italia	Juan Manuel Fangio	1	Officine Alfieri Maserati
Non-championship F2	9/1952	3rd Gran Premio di Modena	José Froilán González	2	Officine Alfieri Maserati
Non-championship F2	3/1953	3rd Gran Premio di Siracusa	Emmanuel de Graffenried	1	Enrico Platé
Non-championship F2	4/1953	5th Lavant Cup Goodwood	Emmanuel de Graffenried	1	Privateer
Non-championship F2	5/1953	6th Gran Premio di Napoli	Juan Manuel Fangio	2	Officine Alfieri Maserati
Non-championship F2	5/1953	6th Gran Premio di Napoli	José Froilán González	3	Officine Alfieri Maserati
Non-championship F2	5/1953	17th Internationales ADAC Eifelrennen	Emmanuel de Graffenried	1	Privateer
Non-championship F2	9/1953	4th Gran Premio di Modena	Juan Manuel Fangio	1	Officine Alfieri Maserati
Non-championship F2	9/1953	4th Gran Premio di Modena	Onofre Marimón	2	Officine Alfieri Maserati
Non-championship F2	9/1953	4th Gran Premio di Modena	Emmanuel de Graffenried	3	Officine Alfieri Maserati
(Non-championship) F2	6/1954	24th Grand Prix des Frontiéres	Prince Bira	1	Privateer
Non-championship F1	1/1954	11th Gran Premio Ciudad de Buenos Aires	Roberto Miéres	2	Privateer
Non-championship F1	4/1954	15th Grand Prix Automobile de Pau	Roberto Miéres	3	Officine Alfieri Maserati
Non-championship F1	6/1954	13th Gran Premio di Roma	Harry Schell	2	Privateer
Non-championship F1	8/1954	23rd Circuito di Pescara	Harry Schell	3	Privateer

== Technical information ==
A6GCM	1951/1952	Late 1952	1953
engine	6-cylinder inline engine, crankcase made of light alloy		
displacement	1,987 cc (121.3 cu in)	1,988 cc (121.3 cu in)	1,970 cc (120 cu in)
bore × stroke	72.6mm × 80mm	75mm × 75mm	76.2mm × 72mm
compression ratio	13.5:1		12:1
Power at 1/min	160 hp (120 kW) at 6500 rpm	180 hp (130 kW) at 7300 rpm	197 hp (147 kW) at 8000 rpm
valve control	two overhead camshaftn / 2 valves per cylinder		
Carburettor	3 × Weber 38DOC03		
Fuel	Mixture of 85% methyl alcohol, 10% acetone and 5% pure benzene		
cooling	Water, with centrifugal pump and cooler		
transmission	4-speed, 1 reverse gear, multi-plate dry clutch		
brakes	drum brake front and rear		
Shock absorber	Houdaille lever shock absorbers front and rear		
Front suspension	Independent suspension, coil springs		
rear suspension	Rigid axle, leaf springs		
body and frame	Tubular steel frame		
Wheelbase	2280mm		2310mm
Track width front / rear	1278mm / 1200mm		1225mm / 1160mm
curb weight (without driver)	760 kg		750 kg
tank capacity	160 l		200 l
top speed	250-280 km/h		
