= Pietro Palmieri =

Italian racing driver

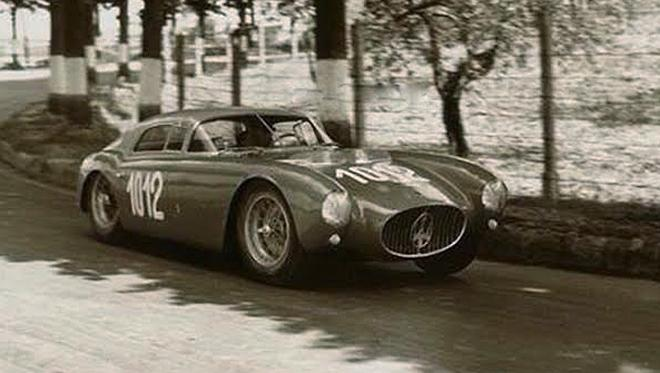
Pietro Palmieri in Maserati at Giro Automobilistico dell'Umbria on 6 June 1954. He ended in 7th place.

Pietro Palmieri (c.1925–1964) was an Italian racing driver. He entered 20 races (18 started), in Fiats, Maseratis, Ferraris and Alfa Romeos. Among his best results were one victory and one second-place finish. After resigning from racing, he was active in horse breeding. Pietro died in a car crash in Rome on 5 March 1964 at the age of 39.

He is not to be confused with Pietro Giacomo Palmieri (1737-1804), a painter and printmaker.

== Complete results ==
Year	Date	Race	Entrant	Car	Teammate(s)	Result
1949	September 25	Giro delle Calabria	-	Fiat 1100	Mario Raffaelli	9th
1950	April 23	Mille Miglia	-	Maserati A6GCS	Franco Meloni	47th
1950	May 7	I Formula Two Gran Premio di Modena	Pietro Palmieri	Maserati A6GCS	none	5th
1951	April 1	Giro di Sicilia	-	Ermini	"Vallecchi"	5th
1951	April 29	Mille Miglia	-	Fiat Ermini Berlinetta	Gianfranco Pieratelli	DNF
1951	August 5	Giro delle Calabria	-	Ferrari 212 Export	"Valecchi"	2nd
1951	August 12	Circuito di Senigallia	-	Ferrari 212 Export	-	4th
1952	May 4	Mille Miglia	-	Fiat 1400	Sandro Sebasti	79th
1952	July 13	Coppa d' Oro delle Dolomiti	-	Alfa Romeo 1900	-	DNF
1952	August 16	12 Hours of Pescara	-	Alfa Romeo	Francesco Matrullo	DNF
1953	April 12	Giro di Sicilia	-	Alfa Romeo 1900 TI	"F. Pianta"	5th
1953	April 26	Mille Miglia	-	Alfa Romeo 1900 TI	Giorgio Pianta	DNF
1953	May 14	Targa Florio	Pietro Palmieri	Ferrari 250 MM	none	DNF
1953	June 14	1953 24 Hours of Le Mans	Alfa Romeo SpA	Alfa Romeo 6C 3000 CM	Antonio Stagnoli	DNS
1953	June 21	Circuito do Porto	-	Ferrari 250 MM	-	DNF
1953	June 28	Giro dell'Umbria	-	Alfa Romeo 1900 TI	"Casavecchia"	7th
1953	June 29	Monza Grand Prix	-	Ferrari 250 MM	-	DNF
1953	August 2	Giro delle Calabria	-	Lancia Aurelia	Mario Maggio	1st
1954	May 2	Mille Miglia	-	Maserati A6GCS/53 Coupe	-	DNS
1954	June 6	Giro dell'Umbria	-	Maserati A6GCS/53 Coupe	-	7th
