= Ferrari 166 F2 =

Racing car

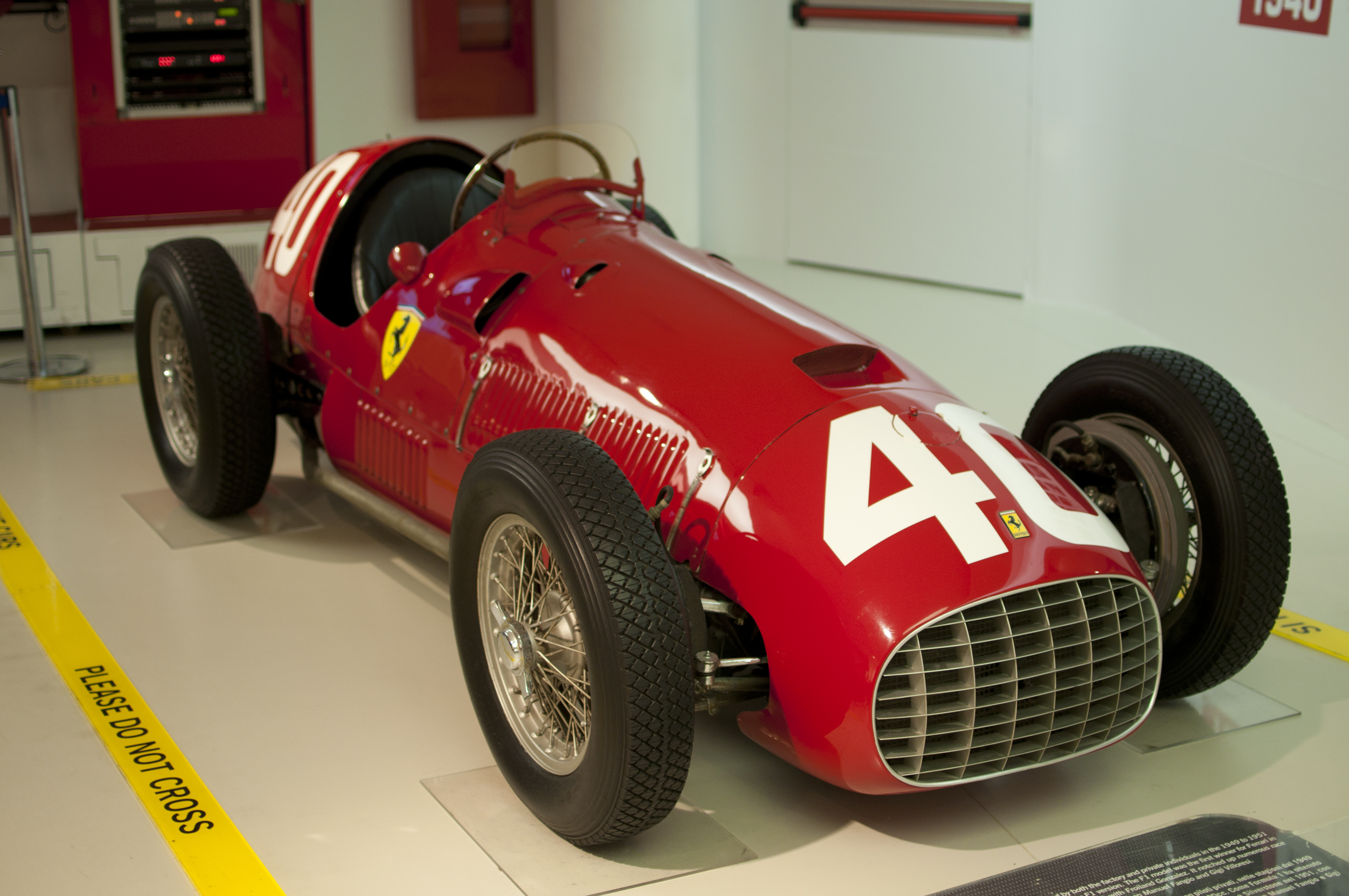
- Category: Formula Two
- Constructor: Ferrari
- Designers: Enzo Ferrari, Gioacchino Colombo, Valerio Colotti
- Production: 1948
- Predecessor: Ferrari 125 F1
- Successor: Ferrari 212 F2

Technical specifications
- Suspension (front): Independent suspension with deformable quadrilaterals and levers
- Suspension (rear): De Dion tube with transverse lever
- Length: 3,600 mm (141.7 in)
- Width: 1,400 mm (55.1 in)
- Height: 1,050 mm (41.3 in)
- Wheelbase: 2,160 mm (85.0 in)
- Engine: Ferrari Colombo 1,995 cc (121.7 cu in) V12
- Weight: 680 kg (1,499.1 lb)
- Tyres: Dunlop; Pirelli

Competition history
- Notable entrants: Scuderia Ferrari
- Debut: 1948 Italian Grand Prix

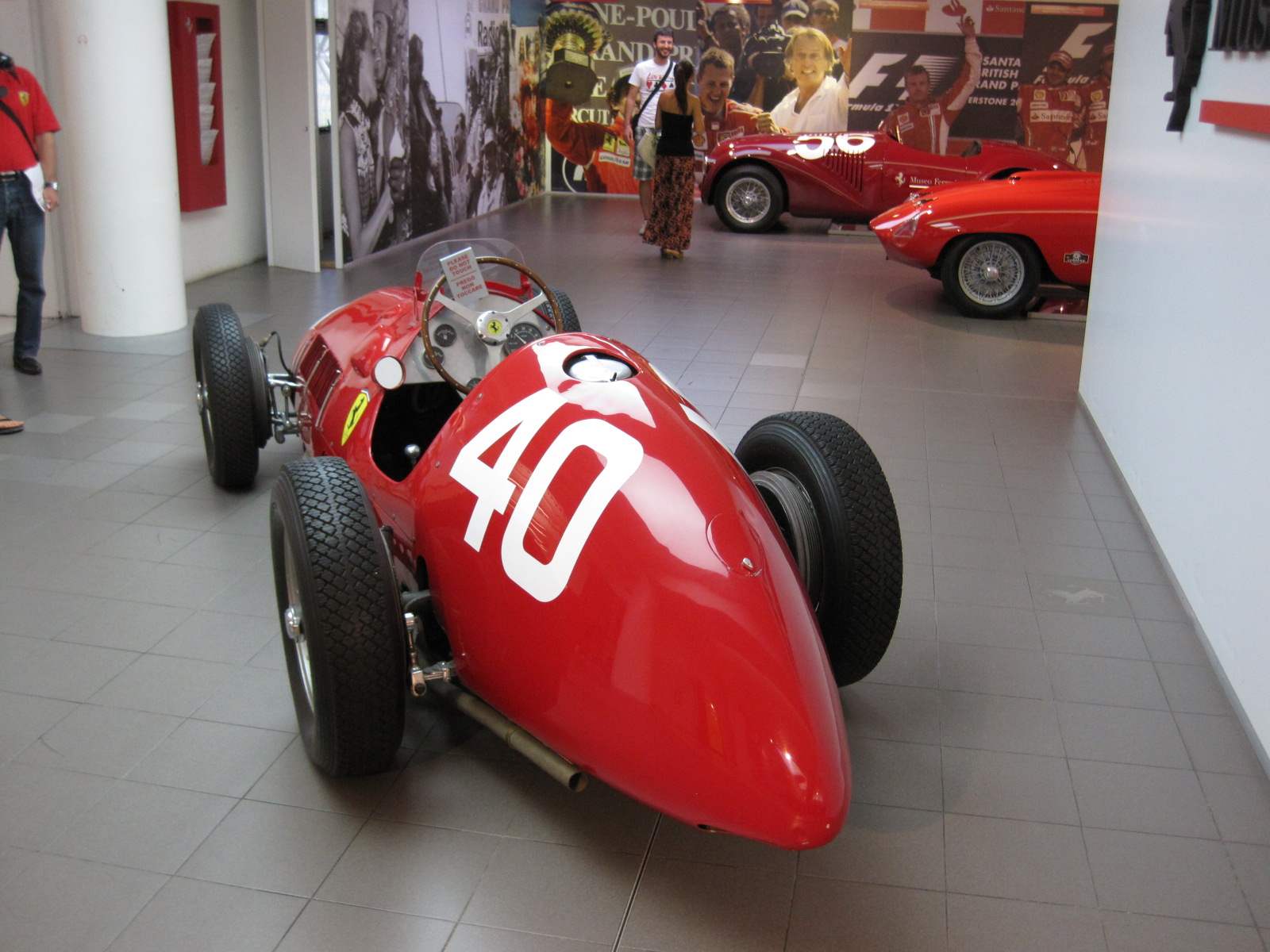
Ferrari 166 F2 rear

The Ferrari 166 F2 is an open-wheel formula racing single-seater car, designed, developed and built by Italian manufacturer and team Scuderia Ferrari, for Formula 2 racing, in 1948. This is the car in which Argentinian driver, and eventual five-time Formula One world champion, Juan Manuel Fangio, became known in Europe.

== History ==
Inspired by the Ferrari 125 F1, the 166 F2 uses its improved and lowered chassis with a longer wheelbase which improves stability in turns. The front wheels are independent and the rear is fitted with a rigid axle, replaced in 1950 by a de Dion axle.

The Ferrari 166 F2 was the first of a long series of cars comprising the 166 families. After the 166 F2, Ferrari introduced the 166 S, 166 Inter, and 166 MM.

The Ferrari 166 F2 made its racing debut at the Florence Grand Prix on September 26, 1948, won by French driver Raymond Sommer, nicknamed the Boar of the Ardennes.

== Design ==
The Ferrari 166 F2 was designed around the Ferrari 2-litre V12 engine which already fitted the 166 "civilian GT" versions with covered wheels, but whose power had been increased to 150 hp thanks to the adoption of three Weber 32DCF carburetors instead of one on the sports versions.

The Ferrari 166 F2, whose name derives mainly from its destination to participate in Formula 2 competitions, was the car that made the Argentinian driver Juan Manuel Fangio famous in Europe. The model he drove never sported Ferrari red but a blue/yellow livery in the colors of the Argentinian Automobile Club.

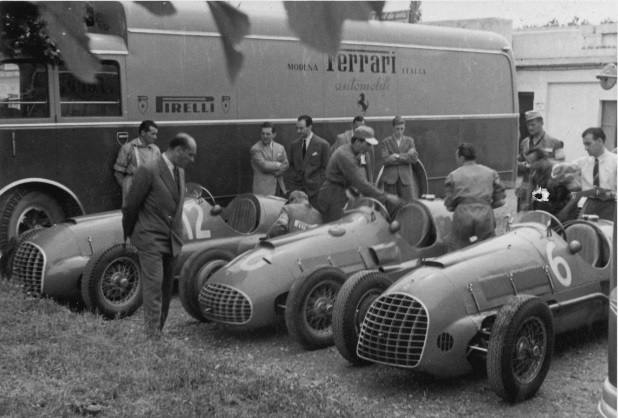
A 166 F2 at Monza on 28 May 1950

The 166 F2 has constantly evolved and will become more and more competitive until it uncompromisingly dominates the races of the time. With this car, Scuderia Ferrari won many victories: 6 out of 13 races in 1949, and 13 out of 18 races in 1950 and 1951 with drivers Ascari, Villoresi, and Fangio in particular.

In 1950, the Ferrari 166 F2 bearing the number 10 finished first in the Grand Prix du Cinquantenaire on the Parc Barbieux circuit in Roubaix, France. Driver Raymond Sommer finished the 101 laps in 2 hours 20 minutes 21 seconds and 1 hundredth.

== Version 166 FL ==
In 1949, Ferrari launched the 166 FL version (for Formula Libre), also known as the 166 C America. This model was an evolution of the basic Italian version only intended for competitions on the South American continent in formula libre. The power of its engine reached 260 hp at 7000 rpm. This car dominated the Argentinian Temporadas for several seasons despite fierce competition from Alfa Romeo, Maserati, and other Mercedes-Benz.

The 166 FL in Argentine yellow and blue colors was built in 1949 for winter racing in Argentina. The 166 FL was the queen of the winters of 1950 and 1951 and Gonzalez led it to victory at the Buenos Aires GP in 1951. In 1953, three victories would be won by Villoresi and Ascari at the wheel of a Ferrari 166 FL.

== Technical specifications ==
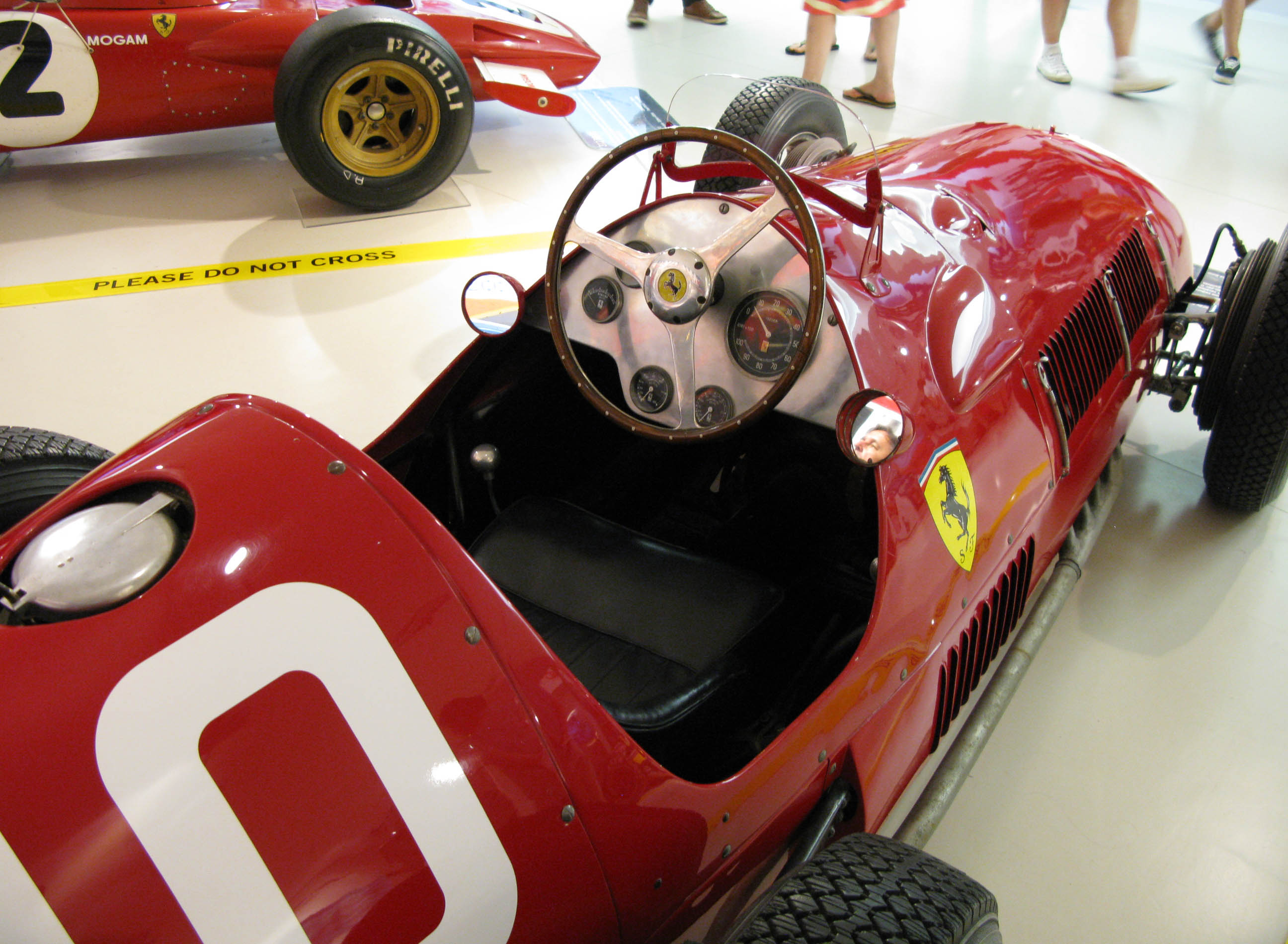
Cockpit

=== Engine ===
- Name: Ferrari Tipo 166 F2 (166 FL)
- Layout: Ferrari 12-cylinder V
- Displacement : 1,995.02 cc (121.744 cu in)
- Bore/stroke: 60 mm (2.4 in) × 58.8 mm (2.31 in)
- Timing: 2-valves per cylinder
- Fuel supply: 3 double-barrel Weber 32 DCF carburettors (1 double-barrel Weber 40 carburettor plus Roots turbocharger)
- Power: 160 hp at 7000 rpm - 310 hp at 7000 rpm with Roots turbocharger

Maximum speed: 7,000 rpm

=== Transmission ===
- Longitudinal gearbox
- Number of gears: 5 gears and reverse
- Max speed: 240 km/h (150 mph)

=== Frame ===
- Tubular single-seater with steel lattice spars and crossmembers
- Wheelbase: 2,160 mm (85 in)
- Front track: 1,278 mm (50.3 in)
- Rear track: 1,250 mm (49 in)
- Weight: 560 kg (1,230 lb)
- Tank: 150 L (40 US gal)

=== Suspensions ===
- Independent front suspension with deformable quadrilaterals and levers
- De Dion type rear axle with transverse lever

=== Wheels ===
- 16-inch rims
- Official single-seater tyres: Pirelli
- Private single-seater tires: Pirelli
