= Autodromo di Modena =

Italian race track

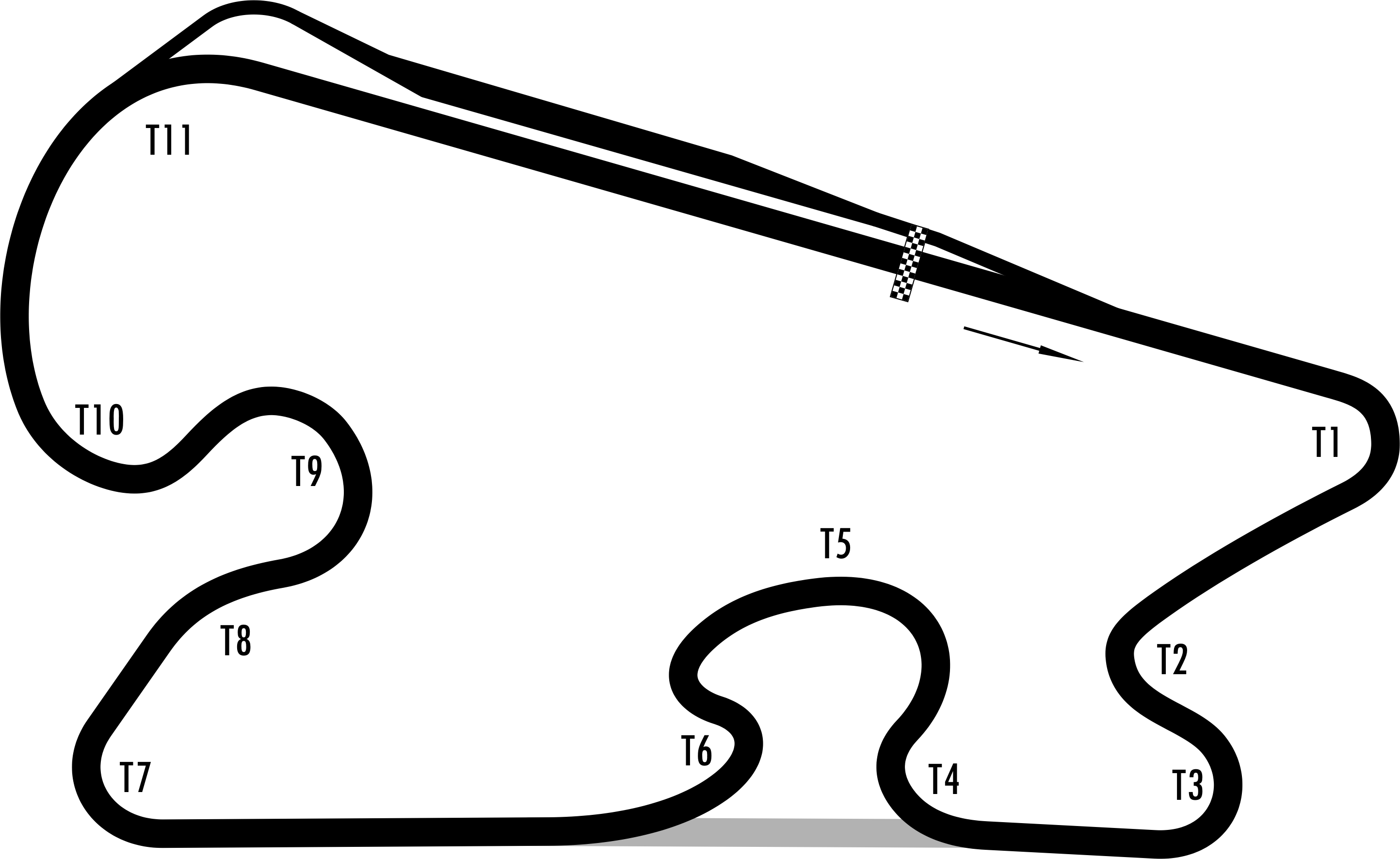
- Full Circuit (2011–present)
- Location: Marzaglia, Province of Modena, Italy
- Coordinates: 44°37′59.34″N 10°48′51.26″E
- Operator: Autodromo di Modena Srl
- Opened: 2011; 15 years ago
- Website: https://www.autodromodimodena.it/

Full Circuit (2011–present)
- Length: 2.068 km (1.285 mi)
- Turns: 11

Autodromo di Modena is a 2.068 km (1.285 mi) racing circuit located in the hamlet of Marzaglia, in the Province of Modena. Built in 2011, the track received FMI and ACI homologation.

== History ==
After Aerautodromo di Modena was dismantled in the 1960s, the Emilian city found itself without a racetrack. Soon after, attempts to build a new one began.

At the beginning of the 2000s, a project was started for the construction of a new circuit near Marzaglia, Province of Modena. In December 2007, plans for the construction of a track of roughly 1600m in length with ample pit spaces was revealed. This circuit's inauguration was planned for 2011. The track was then lengthened to 2007 meters, creating tensions between the Regional Environmental Protection Agency and the urban planners of Modena, but it was later greenlit for completion.

In 2022, the municipality of Modena approved a lengthening of the circuit, which consists in the addition of a 1-kilometer-long straight, which would increase track length to 4.150 km (2.579 mi).

Today, the track is used for a wide range of events, from car and bike manufacturers tests to historic rallies and safe driving courses.

== The Circuit ==
The track, which is 2.068 km (1.285 mi) long, has various elevation changes and alternates a straight of 400 m (1,300 ft) with eleven corners. If needed, the straights can become two by skipping turn 5 and linking turn 4 with turn 6. In 2014, a variation was added in the last corner, with a tighter radius.
