= Caraceni (company) =

Italian tailoring house

Domenico Caraceni

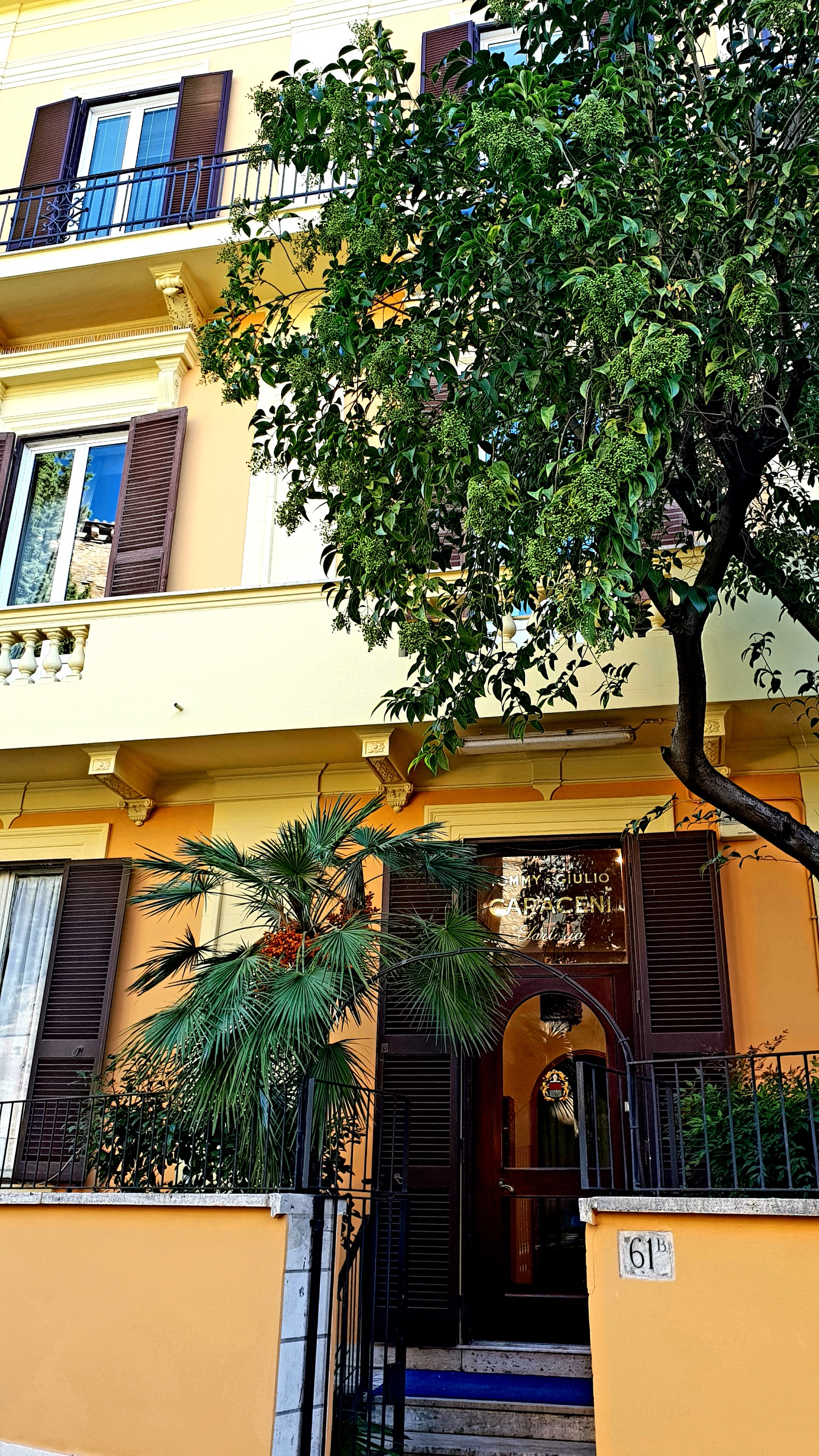
- Caraceni in Rome
- Founded: Rome, Italy 1913
- Founder: Domenico Caraceni
- Headquarters: Italy
- Products: Men's tailoring, Classic Italian suits

Caraceni is an Italian tailoring house founded in Rome in 1913 by Domenico Caraceni.

Originating from an Abruzzese tailoring family, the name Caraceni refers to a group of independent ateliers founded by family members or trained associates of the original house: A. Caraceni, Tommy e Giulio Caraceni, Ferdinando Caraceni (now defunct), and Sartoria Domenico Caraceni.

== History ==
The Caraceni tailoring dynasty traces its origins to Ortona a Mare (Province of Chieti), in the Abruzzo region of Italy, where Tommaso Caraceni operated a family tailoring shop in the early 20th century. Tommaso had 13 children, many of whom worked in his tailoring shop. Among them were Domenico, Augusto, and Galliano Caraceni, who learned the craft under their father's guidance before establishing their own ateliers in Rome, Paris, Milan, and Naples.

=== Domenico Caraceni (1913–1980s) ===
Domenico Caraceni (1880–1940), began working in his father's workshop and developed an early interest in tailoring techniques, particularly those of British origin. As a teenager, he disassembled English garments (especially suits from Henry Poole of Savile Row) to study their construction. After an early career in Rome with established tailors like Ottolenghi and Sartoria Comandona, Domenico opened his own atelier in 1913, though it was interrupted by military service during World War I. In 1926, he relocated his main workshop to Via Boncompagni 21 in Rome, then called upon his brothers Augusto and Galliano to expand the business in Milan and Paris, respectively.

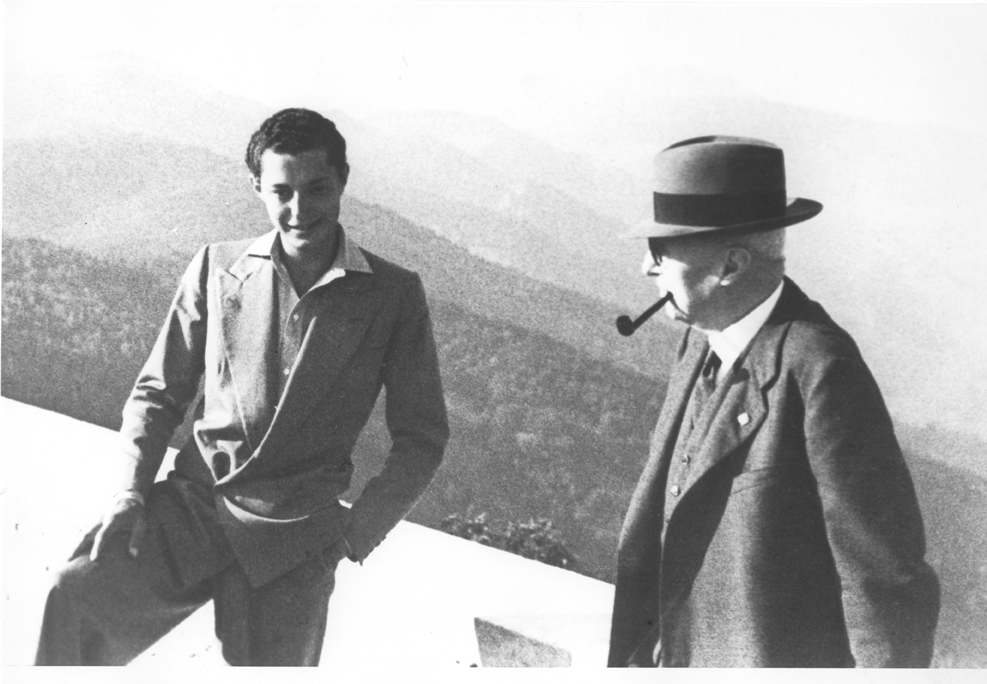
Gianni Agnelli (left) in a Domenico Caraceni suit. Picture from 1936.

Domenico combined Abruzzese and British techniques to develop a lighter and more fluid tailoring style. In 1933, he outlined his methods in a book titled Orientamenti nuovi nella tecnica e nell’arte del sarto. His house became known for dressing notable clients including King George V, Edward VIII, the young Gianni Agnelli, and Josephine Baker.

Following Domenico's death in 1940, his brother Galliano took over the original atelier on Via Boncompagni and managed it until his own passing in the 1980s.

=== A. Caraceni (1935–present) ===
In 1935, Augusto Caraceni (1893–1972) opened a tailoring atelier under his own name at 92 Avenue d'Iéna in Paris. Housed in a large three-story building, the workshop offered full in-house production and quickly attracted high-profile clients, including Josephine Baker and Charles Boyer. The Paris operation was forced to close in 1939 due to the outbreak of World War II and Augusto's status as an Italian national in enemy territory. During the German occupation of Italy, his son Mario narrowly escaped execution in 1943 after being mistaken for a British spy due to the presence of British tailoring labels (Burberry and Lock & Co.) in his garments.

In April 1946, Augusto opened a new workshop in Milan, located at Via Fatebenefratelli 16. Initially reserved for Italian nobility, it gradually expanded its clientele to include international figures in the 1950s and 1960s. In 1972, Mario Caraceni succeeded him at the head of the atelier, and chose to retain the name "A. Caraceni" in honor of his father. Considered a highly skilled cutter and tailor, Mario continued to develop the house's reputation. He received several awards over his career, including the St. Omobono Prize, the Gold Medal of the Milanese Tailors' Guild, and the National Academy of Tailors' Grand Prize for lifetime achievement.

This atelier has remained in continuous operation and direct family hands. Upon Mario's retirement in 1998, leadership passed to his daughter Rita Maria Caraceni and her husband Carlo Andreacchio. Their children Massimiliano and Valentina Andreacchio Caraceni, joined the business in 2004. The workshop preserves family-based techniques and produces fully hand-made bespoke garments. As of 2011, the atelier employs around 40 people and produces approximately 700 bespoke garments per year.

=== Tommy e Giulio Caraceni (1963–present) ===
Galliano Caraceni, the youngest of the three Caraceni brothers, initially opened a tailoring branch in Naples, but the regional differences in style between the local Neapolitan school and the Caraceni method rooted in Abruzzese traditions limited its success. He eventually returned to Rome, where he managed the main Caraceni atelier on Via Boncompagni, continuing the business after Domenico's death in 1940, while his brother Augusto settled in Milan.

Unlike his brothers, Galliano focused primarily on the business and management side rather than cutting or sewing. He supervised workshops and oversaw client relations while leaving the tailoring itself to trained cutters and artisans. During the 1950s, he served as Vice President of the Associazione Artistica Habilitamento and built a clientele that included both aristocratic and celebrity patrons such as Tyrone Power, Gary Cooper, and Maria Felix.

Tommy and Giulio Caraceni, the sons of Galliano, studied under the guidance of their father with master tailors in Paris, Genoa, and London, working with houses such as Henry Poole, Kilgour, and Petitta. In 1963, they left Via Boncompagni to establish their own tailoring house on Via Campania in Rome, reportedly due to internal family disagreements. Throughout their careers, Tommy and Giulio have dressed notable figures including Gianni Agnelli and Luca di Montezemolo. As of 2011, the atelier continues to operate with the support of Carlo Tonini (head cutter) and Guido Sinigaglia (Tommy's son-in-law), and remains committed to traditional bespoke methods, resisting the broader industry shift toward ready-to-wear and made-to-measure.

=== Ferdinando Caraceni (1967–2014) ===
Ferdinando Caraceni (1923–2004) was born in Ortona a Mare, the same town as Domenico, Augusto, and Galliano Caraceni. Despite the shared surname and birthplace, he was not related to the Caraceni tailoring family. He began his training in 1936 under Alessandro Cavaliere, one of the few remaining tailors in the town after the original Caraceni brothers had relocated. At age 16 he went to work with Domenico Caraceni, then refined his tailoring skills with Augusto Caraceni as a textile cutter, continuing to work beside him for 29 years.

In 1967, Ferdinando established his own tailoring house on Via San Marco in Milan, offering bespoke suits under the name Ferdinando Caraceni. In the 1980s, his daughter Nicoletta Caraceni joined the atelier and later took over the business upon his death in 2004, until her own retirement in 2024. Over the years, clients have included Yves Saint Laurent, Diego Della Valle, the Aga Khan, and members of the Benetton family.

=== Sartoria Domenico Caraceni (1998-present) ===
A fourth atelier, Sartoria Domenico Caraceni, was established in 1998 by Gianni Campagna, a former apprentice of Domenico Caraceni, who acquired the brand name. Located on Via Corso Venezia in Milan, it expanded the original bespoke offer to include ready-to-wear garments and perfume. The workshop took a less traditional direction and operates independently of the original Caraceni family.

== Notable clients ==
The various Caraceni "sartorias" have made suits for various celebrities over the years, including Tyrone Power, Humphrey Bogart, Gary Cooper, Cary Grant, Yves Saint Laurent, Gianni Agnelli, Diego Granese, Sophia Loren and fashion designer Valentino Garavani. The Caraceni label is also famous for dressing generations of The Kings of Greece and Italy, The Prince of Wales, Prince Rainier of Monaco, Italian Prime Minister Silvio Berlusconi and Aristotle Onassis.

== See also ==
- Italian fashion
- Made in Italy
