= Sergio Sighinolfi =

Italian racing driver

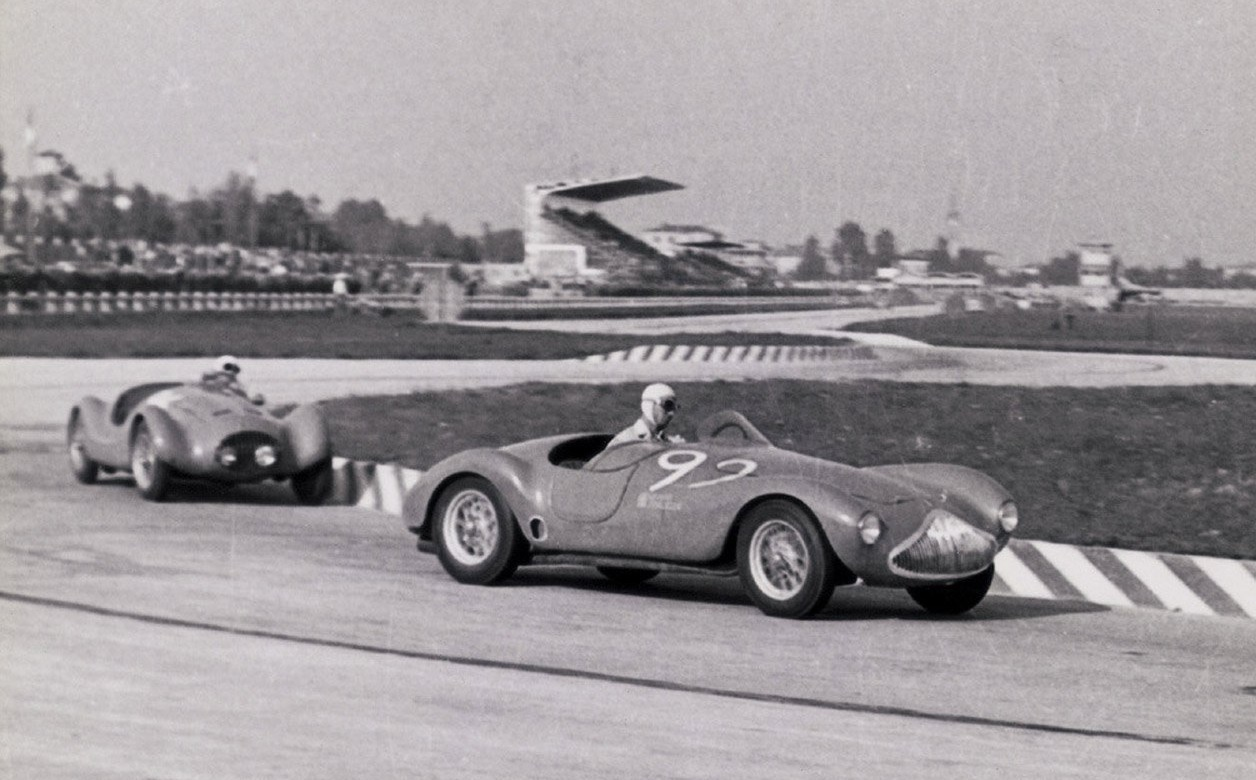

Sergio Sighinolfi (April 25, 1925 in Modena – September 7, 1956 in San Venanzio) was an Italian racing driver. He entered a Formula One race in 1952 as reserve driver for Scuderia Ferrari. But as all the Ferrari drivers started the race, Sighinolfi could not. He never participated in Formula One again. He did however enter 37 sports car races between 1948 and 1955, his best results being two victories, three second-place finishes and two third-place finishes. He died at the age of 31 the day after crashing into a truck, driving a Ferrari prototype, in San Venanzio, between Modena and Maranello.

== List of results ==
Year	Date	Race	Entrant	Car	Teammate(s)	Result
1948	August 15	Circuito di Pescara		Stanguellini S1100		13th
1949	March 20	Targa Florio		Ferrari 166SC	Roberto Vallone	DNF
1949	April 24	Mille Miglia		Ferrari 166SC	Roberto Vallone	DNF
1949	May 8	Reggio Emilia (S1.1)		Stanguellini S1100		3rd
1949	August 15	Circuito di Pescara		Stanguellini S1100		DNF
1949	August 21	Circuito di Senigallia (S750)		Stanguellini S1100		5th
1949	August 21	Circuito di Senigallia (S1.1)		Stanguellini S1100		DNF
1949	September 4	Circuito di Trieste		Stanguellini S1100		
1949	October 30	Madrid Grand Prix		Stanguellini S1100		DNF
1950	April 2	Targa Florio		Ferrari 166MM	Vittorio Marzotto	DNF
1950	April 23	Mille Miglia		Stanguellini S1100	A.Gambiani	DNF
1950	May 6	Modena (S1.1)		Stanguellini S1100		2nd
1950	June 11	Rome Grand Prix		Stanguellini		4th
1950	July 16	Coppa d' Oro delle Dolomiti		Stanguellini S1100		4th
1950	August 20	Autodromo di Pergusa		Stanguellini S1100		DNF
1950	October 8	Modena (S750)		Stanguellini S750		DNF
1950	October 8	Modena (S1.1)		Stanguellini S1100		1st
1951	March 10	Coppa d’Oro di Sicilia (S1.1)		Stanguellini S1100		1st
1951	April 1	Giro di Sicilia		Stanguellini S1100	Pippo Bertazzoni	3rd
1951	April 29	Mille Miglia		Stanguellini S1100	Pippo Bertazzoni	DNF
1951	May 6	Modena (S750)	Salvatore Casella	Stanguellini S750	Salvatore Casella	
1951	May 6	Modena (S1.1)		Stanguellini S1100		2nd
1951	June 3	Coppa della Toscana		Stanguellini S1100	Pippo Bertazzoni	
1951	August 12	Circuito di Senigallia (S1.1)		Stanguellini S1100		DNF
1952	March 16	Syracuse Grand Prix	Scuderia Marzotto	Ferrari 166C	Vittorio Marzotto; Piero Carini	DNF
1952	March 19	Coppa d'Oro di Sicilia	Scuderia Guastella	Ferrari 212 Export	none	DNF
1952	May 4	Mille Miglia	Scuderia Marzotto	Ferrari 166MM	Pippo Bertazzoni	DNF
1952	July 13	Coppa d' Oro delle Dolomiti		Ferrari 166MM		17th
1952	August 16	12 Hours of Pescara		Ferrari 166MM	Emilio Giletti	6th
1953	April 26	Mille Miglia	Anna Maria Peduzzi	Stanguellini S750	Anna Maria Peduzzi; Franco Goldoni	DNS
1953	May 14	Targa Florio		Nardi Danese		DNS
1953	July 19	Circuito Montenero (S1.1)		Stanguellini S1100		DNF
1953	August 9	Circuito di Senigallia (S1.1)		Stanguellini S1100		4th
1953	August 15	12 Hours of Pescara		Ermini	"Cerrato"	
1953	September 6	Circuito di Sassari		Osca MT4		4th
1954	August 8	Circuito di Senigallia (S2.0)	Scuderia Ferrari	Ferrari 500 Mondial	none	2nd
1955	May 1	Mille Miglia	Scuderia Ferrari	Ferrari 750 Monza		6th
1955	October 16	Targa Florio	Scuderia Ferrari	Ferrari 750 Monza	Umberto Maglioli	DNF
