= Aerautodromo di Modena =

Automotive race track in Modena, Italy

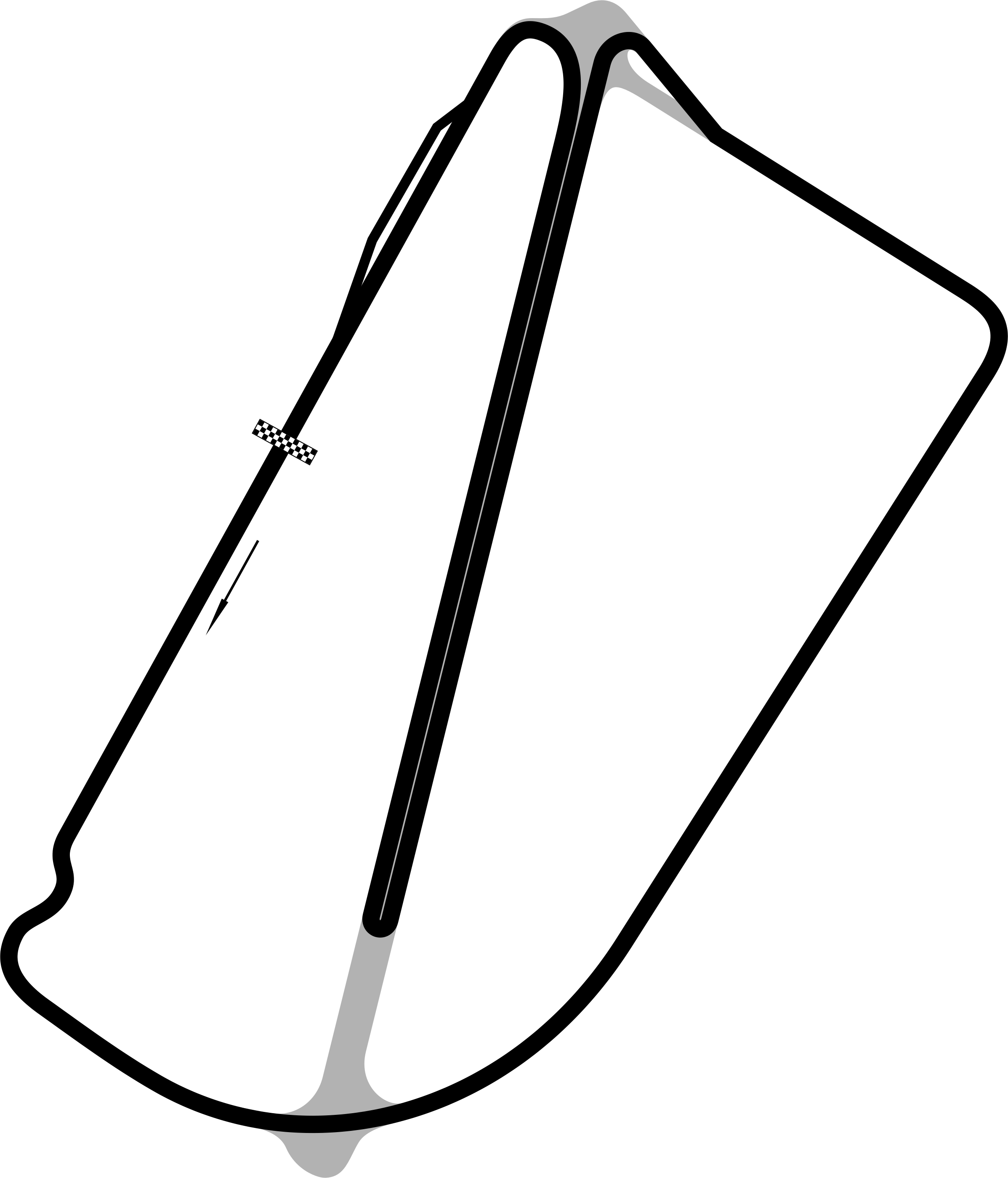
- Full Circuit (1950–1953)
- Location: Modena, Italy
- Coordinates: 44°39′1″N 10°54′21″E
- Broke ground: 1949
- Opened: 7 May 1950; 76 years ago
- Closed: 1975
- Major events: Modena Grand Prix (1950–1953, 1957, 1960–1961)

Airfield Circuit (1950–1975)
- Length: 2.366 km (1.470 mi)
- Turns: 8
- Race lap record: 0:59.000 ( (Sweden) Jo Bonnier/ (West Germany) Wolfgang von Trips, Porsche 718/2/Ferrari Dino 156P, 1960, F2)

Full Circuit (1950–1953)
- Length: 3.800 km (2.361 mi)
- Turns: 9
- Race lap record: 1:53.200 ( (Italy) Alberto Ascari, Ferrari 500 F2, 1951, F2)

Aerautodromo di Modena was a race track on the edge of Modena in Italy. The track had a length of 2.366 km (1.470 mi). It was opened in 1950 and the circuit was crossed by an airstrip of about 1.600 km (0.994 mi) in length which was used by the local flying club.

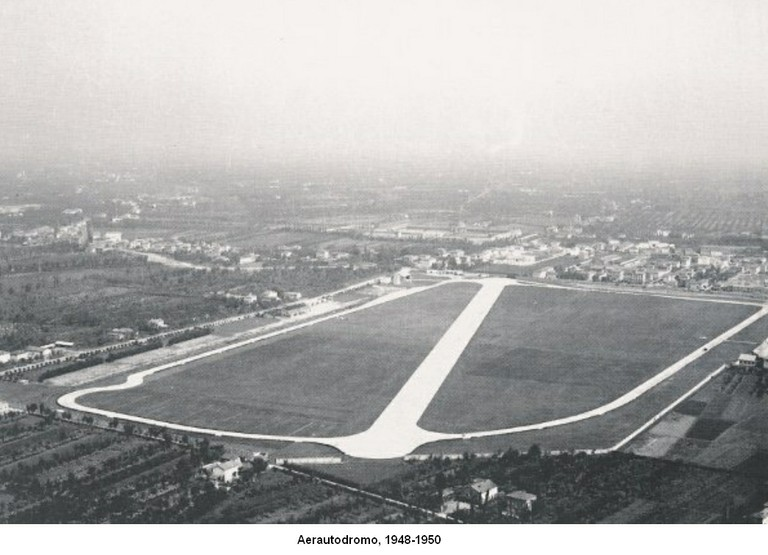
Aerautodromo di Modena between 1948 and 1950

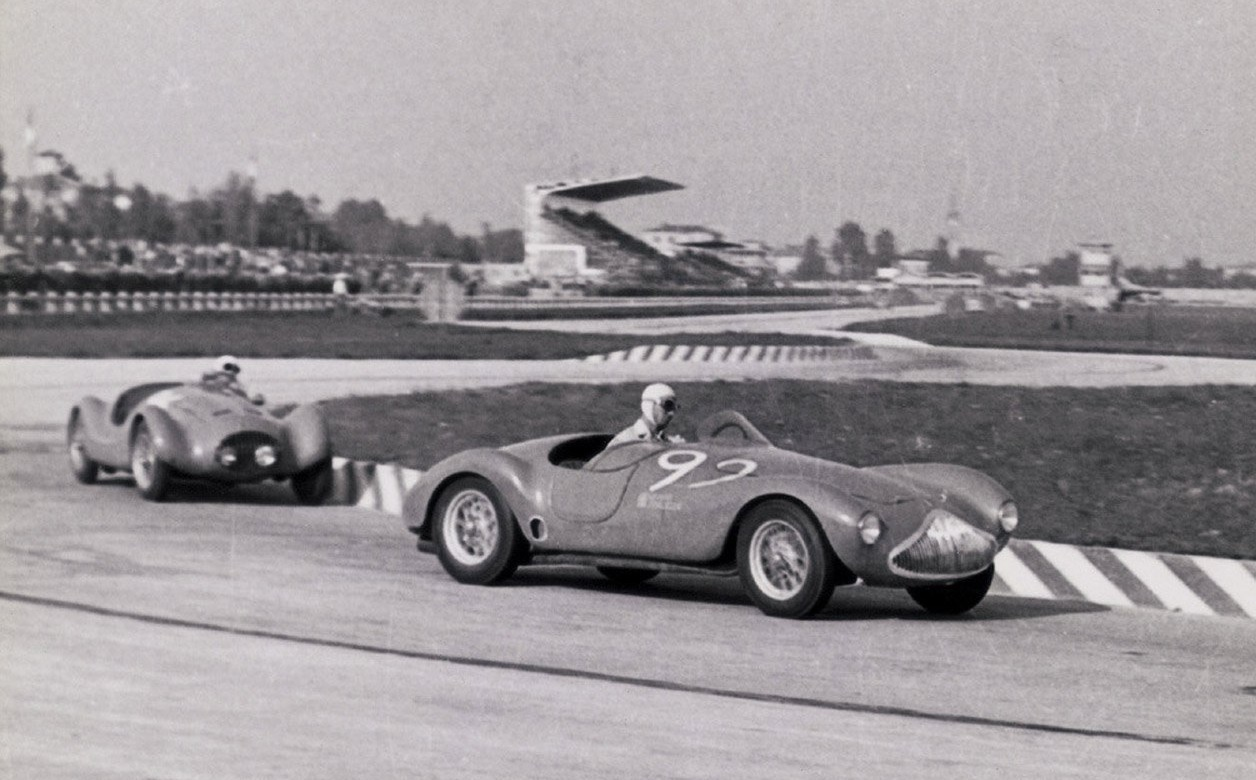
1950 Modena Grand Prix: Daniele Bonetti (Osca) leading Sergio Ghinolfi (Stanguellini)

The track hosted nine editions of the Modena Grand Prix for Formula One and Formula Two racing cars, the last one in 1961. The circuit continued to host other racing events (sports cars, grand touring, Formula Junior, motorcycles) until 1975.

In the 1960s and 1970s the track also served as a test track for Ferrari and Maserati during the morning or afternoon (but not both) on weekdays. At other times of day it was used by residents of the adjacent military camp for driver training while maintaining its original function of airport for private flights. Ferrari driver Mike Parkes, an accomplished pilot, used to fly in regularly from England on his own craft. Despite the expansion of nearby Modena, which involved a proliferation of apartment blocks and electricity pylons, the airstrip continued to be a favoured venue for a number of local aerobatics enthusiasts until 1974.

In the early 1970s, Enzo Ferrari, aided and abetted by Maserati and Automobili Stanguellini, demanded an upgrade from the Modena Town Council and Automobile Club d'Italia, the reasoning being that the race track lacked basic safety requirements and was inadequate to test modern racing cars. The proposal was initially discussed with interest, but eventually stalled due to lack of political will. Frustrated by the lack of progress in the negotiations, Ferrari then proceeded to buy the land adjacent to his factory and build the Fiorano Circuit, a 2.997 km (1.862 mi) long track still in use these days to test Ferrari racing and road cars. In 1972 Automobile Club d'Italia decided to invest in the nearby semi-permanent Imola circuit, effectively ending Modena's prospects of holding a modern Formula One race.

The circuit was subsequently demolished, and the site redeveloped as a public park to honour Enzo Ferrari in 1991.

In 2011 a new Modena Autodrome opened in the Marzaglia area close to Via Aemilia. The track is 2.007 km (1.247 mi) long and is mostly used for local competitions.
