= Zagato (surname) =

Zagato is an Italian surname. Notable people with the surname include:

- Elio Zagato (1921 – 2009), Italian automobile designer
- Ugo Zagato (1890– 1968), Italian automobile designer

== See also ==
- Zagato
