= 1953 10 Hours of Messina =

← Previous race	Next race →
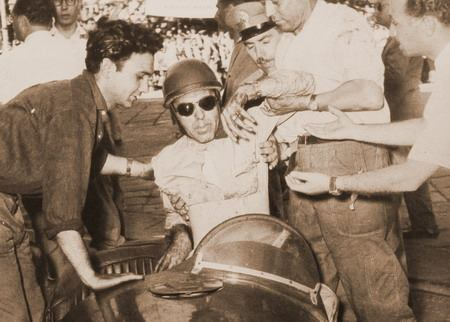
- The Messinese Mario Piccolo is extracted from his car exhausted after the arrival.

Race details
- Date: 26 July 1953
- Official name: 10 Hours of Messina
- Location: Messina, Italy
- Course length: 1102,043 km

Podium
First	(Italy) Eugenio Castellotti (Italy) Giulio Musitelli	Ferrari 212 MM
Second	(Italy) Franco Cornacchia (Italy) Giovanni Bracco	Ferrari 212 MM
Third	(Italy) Antonio Pucci (Italy) Giuseppe de Sarzana	Lancia Aurelia GT

The second 10 Hours of Messina was a sports car race, held on 26 July 1953 in the street circuit of Messina, Italy.

== Final standings ==
- Started: 39
- Classified: 23

#	Drivers	Team	Laps
1.	(Italy) Eugenio Castellotti (Italy) Giulio Musitelli	Ferrari 250 MM	144
2.	(Italy) Franco Cornacchia (Italy) Giovanni Bracco	Ferrari 250 MM	140
3.	(Italy) Antonio Pucci (Italy) Giuseppe de Sarzana	Lancia Aurelia GT 2500	138
4.	(Italy) Luigi Piotti (Italy) Guido Moroni	Ferrari 212 MM	136
5.	(Italy) Guglielmo Pinzero (Italy) Pasquale Placido	Ferrari 250 MM	136
6.	(Italy) Enzo Pinzero (Italy) Gerino Gerini	Ferrari 250 MM	134
7.	(Italy) Paolo Gravina (Italy) Lorenzo Delpino	Fiat 8V	134
8.	(Italy) Bruno Sterzi (Italy) Franco Cortese	Ferrari 166 MM Vignale Spider s/n 0278M	133
9.	(Italy) Pietro Laureati (Italy) Amato	Alfa Romeo 1900 TI	132
10.	(Italy) Simontacchi (Italy) Luigi Bosisio	Fiat 8V	132
11.	(Italy) Soldani (Italy) Angeli	Alfa Romeo 2000	127
12.	(Italy) Scaletta (Italy) Fancelli	Alfa Romeo 1900 TI	124
13.	(Italy) Salvatore de Cordova (Italy) F. de Cordova	Alfa Romeo 1900 TI	121
14.	(Italy) Sannino (Italy) Giuseppe Ruggero	Alfa Romeo 1900 TI	116
15.	(Italy) Alessandro Zafferri (Italy) Mario Della Favera	Alfa Romeo 1900 TI	115
16.	(Italy) Colocci (Italy) Mariucci	Lancia Aurelia 2000	115
17.	(Italy) Consiglio (Italy) Claudio Faranda	Lancia Aurelia 2000	113
18.	(Italy) Mario Piccolo (Italy) Gugliotta Nardi	Danese 750	112
19.	(Italy) Miceli (Italy) Giamporcaro	Alfa Romeo 1900TI	108
20.	(Italy) Faranda (Italy) Savarese	BMW 750	98
21.	(Italy) Sebasti (Italy) Scarlatti	Alfa Romeo 1900	94
not finish	(Italy) Giuseppe Rossi	Stanguellini S1100	DNF
other starters	(Italy) Luigi Bordonaro (Italy) Fondi	Lancia G.T. 2500	

== See also ==
- Messina Grand Prix (auto race that replaced it)
