= 1954 10 Hours of Messina =

| ← Previous race | Next race → |
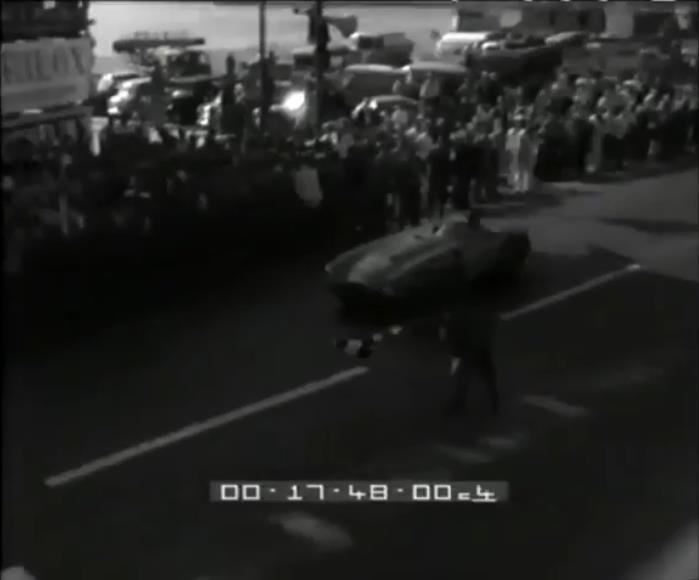
- The arrive of the winner Sgorbati

Race details
- Date: 25 July 1954
- Official name: 10 Hours of Messina
- Location: Messina, Italy
- Distance: 144 laps, 1096.870 km

Fastest lap
| Driver | (Italy) Luigi Musso | Maserati A6GCS |
- Time: 3:56 on lap (127.500 km/h)

Podium
| First | (Italy) Roberto Sgorbati (Italy) Giuseppe Sgorbati | Osca 2000 |

The 3rd 10 Hours of Messina was a sports car race, held on 25 July 1954 in the street circuit of Messina, Italy.

== Final standings ==
- Started: 39
- Classified: 23

| # | Drivers | Team |
|---|---|---|
| 1. | (Italy) Roberto Sgorbati (Italy) Giuseppe Sgorbati | Osca 2000S |
| 2. | (Italy) Vittorio Colocci (Italy) Franco Meloni | Ferrari 3.0 |
| 3. | (Italy) Elio Zagato (Italy) Simontacchi | Fiat 8V |
| 4. | (Italy) Piero Carini (Italy) Pietro Laureati | Alfa Romeo 2000 Super Sport |
| 5. | (Italy) Cerri (Italy) Chiappini | Lancia Aurelia GT 2500 |
| 6. | (Italy) Giulio Musitelli (Italy) Franco Cortese | Ferrari 500 Mondial |
| 7. | (Italy) Bartolomeo Donato (Italy) Donato | Maserati A6GCS 2075 |
| 8. | (Italy) Gaetano Starrabba (Italy) Giacona | Lancia Aurelia GT 2500 |
| 9. | (Italy) Salvatore La Pira (Italy) Vito Sabbia | Lancia Aurelia GT 2500 |
| 10. | (Italy) Bernardini (Italy) Matteucci | Alfa Romeo 1900 TI |
| 11. | (Italy) Mario Piazza (Italy) Bianca Maria Piazza | Ferrari 500 Mondial |
| 12. | (Italy) Micelli (Italy) Perrone | Alfa Romeo 1900 TI |
| 13. | (Italy) Guido Perrella (Italy) Giuseppe Ruggero | Lancia 2000 |
| 14. | (Italy) Alfonso Vella (Italy) F. de Cordova | Jaguar |
| 15. | (Italy) Russo (Italy) Gianfranco Fabbri | Lancia 2000 |
| 16. | (Italy) Corrado Salvati (Italy) Martino | Alfa Romeo 1900 TI |
| 17. | (Italy) Velis (Italy) Giacone | Fiat 1400 |
| 18. | (Italy) Luigi Musso (Italy) Giuseppe Musso | Maserati A6GCS 2078 |
| DNF | (Italy) Umberto Maglioli (Italy) Piotti | Ferrari 250 Monza |
| DNF | (Italy) Franco Cornacchia (Italy) Gerino Gerini | Ferrari 250 Monza |

== See also ==
- Messina Grand Prix (auto race that replaced it)
