= 1952 10 Hours of Messina =

Next race →

Race details
- Date: 24 August 1952
- Official name: 10 Hours of Messina
- Location: Messina, Italy
- Course length: 982.8 km

Pole position
Driver	(Italy) Carlo Gazzabini (Italy) Sergio Ferraguti	Ferrari 2.6
- Time: 111.500 km/h

Podium
First	(Italy) Clemente Biondetti (Italy) Franco Cornacchia	Ferrari 212 MM

The 1st 10 Hours of Messina was a sports car race, held on 24 August 1952 in the street circuit of Messina, Italy.

== Final standings ==
- Started: 39
- Classified: 23

#	Drivers	Team	Average
1	(Italy) Clemente Biondetti (Italy) Franco Cornacchia	Ferrari 212 MM	98.28 km/h
2	(Italy) Carlo Gazzabini (Italy) Sergio Ferraguti	Ferrari 212 Export	97.47 km/h
3	(Italy) Gianfranco Moroni (Italy) "W"	Ferrari 2.6	93.9 km/h
4	(Italy) Garufi (Italy) Ubbiali	Aurelia B21	km/h
5	(Italy) Bianca Maria Piazza (Italy) Mario Piazza	Ferrari	km/h
5	(Italy) Becucci (Italy) ?	Alfa Romeo 1.9	km/h

== See also ==
- Messina Grand Prix (auto race that replaced it)
