= 1955 10 Hours of Messina =

← Previous race	Next race →
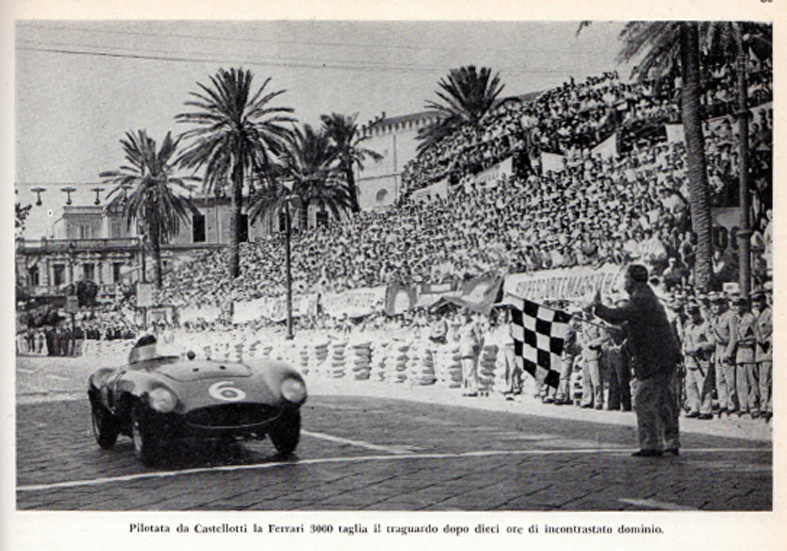
- The Ferrari 3000m driven by Eugenio Castellottim cross the finish line after 10 hours of unchallenged domination.

Race details
- Date: 24 July 1955
- Official name: 10 Hours of Messina
- Location: Messina, Italy
- Distance: 157 laps, 1202,300 km

Fastest lap
Driver	(Italy) Roberto Mieres	Maserati 300S
- Time: 3:26 on lap (133.671 km/h)

Podium
First	(France) Maurice Trintignant (Italy) Eugenio Castellotti	Ferrari 750 Monza
Second	(Venezuela) Joao dos Santos (Argentina) Oscar Cabalén	Ferrari 500 Mondial
Third	(Italy) M. Teresa de Filippis (Italy) Giulio Musitelli	Maserati A6GCS

The 4th 10 Hours of Messina was a sports car race, held on 25 July 1955 in the street circuit of Messina, Italy.

== Final standings ==
- Started: 23
- Classified: 6

#	Drivers	Team	Average speed	Cause of retirement
1.	(France) Maurice Trintignant (Italy) Eugenio Castellotti	Ferrari 750 Monza	120.210 km/h	
2.	(Venezuela) Joao Rezende dos Santos (Argentina) Oscar Cabalén	Ferrari 500 Mondial		
3.	(Italy) Maria Teresa de Filippis (Italy) Giulio Musitelli	Maserati A6GCS		
4.	(Argentina) Roberto Mieres (Italy) Franco Bordoni	Maserati 300S		
5.	(Italy) Guido Mancini (Italy) Gastone Crepaldi	Ferrari 500 Mondial		
6.	(Italy) Franco Cornacchia (Italy) Giuseppe Rossi	Ferrari 500 Mondial		
not classified	xxx	Fiat 8V		
not classified	xxx	Lancia Aurelia		
DNF	(United Kingdom) Dan Margulies (United Kingdom) Graham Hill	Jaguar C-type XKC038		Split fuel tank
DNF	(Italy) Umberto Maglioli (Belgium) Olivier Gendebien	Ferrari 750 Monza		Gearbox
DNF	(Italy) Luigi Musso (Italy) Cesare Perdisa	Maserati 300S		
DNF	(Italy) Gino Munaron	Ferrari 500 Mondial		Control fork in transaxle
other starters	(Italy) Michelangelo Leonardi	Ferrari 166 MM/53		

== See also ==
- Messina Grand Prix (auto race that replaced it)
