= Maurice Trintignant =

French racing driver (1917–2005)

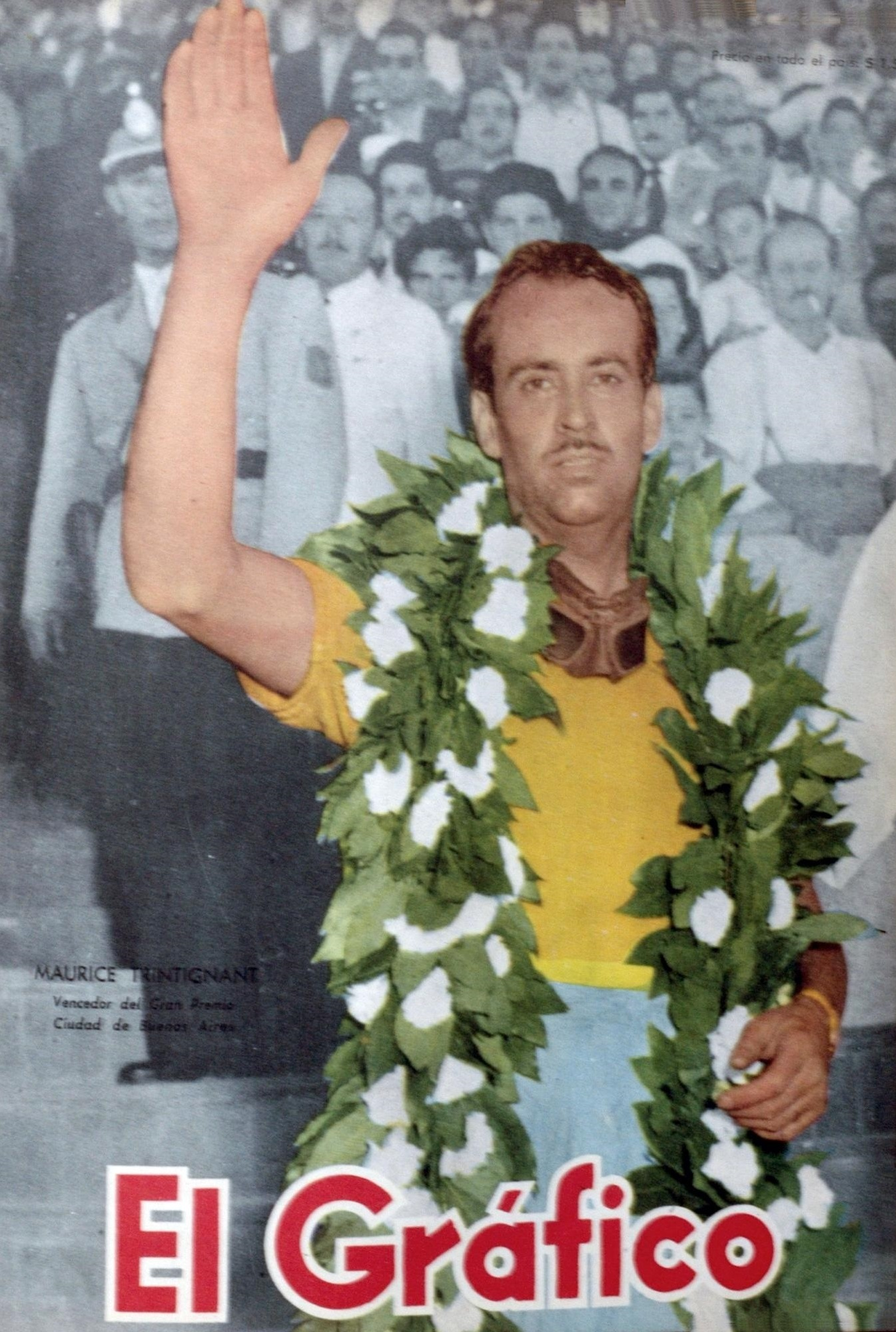
- Trintignant at the 1954 Buenos Aires Grand Prix
- Born: Maurice Bienvenu Jean Paul Trintignant; 30 October 1917; Sainte-Cécile-les-Vignes, Vaucluse, France
- Died: 13 February 2005 (aged 87); Nîmes, Gard, France
- Relatives: Jean-Louis Trintignant (nephew)

Formula One World Championship career
- Nationality: (France) French
- Active years: 1950–1964
- Team(s): Gordini, Rosier, Ferrari, Vanwall, Bugatti, Walker, Centro Sud, BRM, Aston Martin, Serenissima, Parnell, privateer BRM
- Entries: 86 (81 starts) (Note: Trintignant was initially credited with starting the 1951 Italian Grand Prix, as he was secretly replaced by Jean Behra. Gordini team principal Amédée Gordini did not inform the race organisers about the switch as it would have increased the team's starting fee. Some sources still credit Trintignant with the start.)
- Championships: 0
- Wins: 2
- Podiums: 10 (Note: Including both second and third place at the 1955 Argentine Grand Prix.)
- Career points: 72 1/3
- Pole positions: 0
- Fastest laps: 1
- First entry: 1950 Monaco Grand Prix
- First win: 1955 Monaco Grand Prix
- Last win: 1958 Monaco Grand Prix
- Last entry: 1964 Italian Grand Prix

24 Hours of Le Mans career
- Years: 1950–1962, 1964–1965
- Teams: Gordini, Rosier, Ferrari, Aston Martin, Porsche, Serenissima, Maserati, Ford
- Best finish: 1st (1954)
- Class wins: 2 (1953, 1954)

Maurice Bienvenu Jean Paul Trintignant (French pronunciation: [mɔʁis bjɛ̃v(ə)ny ʒɑ̃ pɔl tʁɛ̃tiɲɑ̃]; 30 October 1917 – 13 February 2005) was a French racing driver and winemaker, who competed in Formula One from 1950 to 1964. Trintignant won two Formula One Grands Prix across 15 seasons. In endurance racing, Trintignant won the 24 Hours of Le Mans in 1954 with Ferrari.

Trintignant competed in Formula One in 11 different makes of car (a record), winning two Grands Prix across 15 seasons. He finished fourth in the 1954 and 1955 World Drivers' Championships with Ferrari. He entered 15 editions of the 24 Hours of Le Mans from 1950 to 1965, winning in 1954 alongside José Froilán González, driving the Ferrari 375 Plus, and finished runner-up in 1959.

After retiring from motor racing, Trintignant moved into the winemaking trade, owning a vineyard in Languedoc-Roussillon, where he named his vintage Le Petoulet. (Note: In French, Le Petoulet means "The Rat-Droppings Man", a popular nickname given to Trintignant by Jean-Pierre Wimille.) Trintignant's nephew, Jean-Louis, was a highly successful actor in post-World War II France.

== Racing career ==
Trintignant began racing in 1938, and won the 1939 Grand Prix des Frontières, but his career was interrupted by the Second World War, during which his own Bugatti was stored in a barn. When he rebuilt it for an event of 1945, the Coupé de la Liberation, he overlooked a clogged fuel filter, which caused him to drop out of the race. It transpired that the filter was plugged with rat droppings, earning him the unenviable nickname, from another celebrated racer, Jean-Pierre Wimille, of Le Petoulet, "the rat-droppings man".

In 1948, Trintignant suffered a very serious accident during a support race for the Swiss Grand Prix. He was thrown in the air, and landed in the middle of the race track. His heart stopped beating for one minute and 15 seconds at the hospital, and he was pronounced dead. However, he survived, and woke up after a week-long coma. He kept a very peculiar looking abdomen scar, as the surgeon stitching a large wound did it at a very irregular pace while his heart had stopped beating. For six months, he suffered from amnesia and a loss of motor skills, but he eventually made a near complete recovery. The corner at which he crashed was later named after him. His wife offered him a stuffed teddy bear during his recovery, and as a superstition, Trintignant kept it in his pocket while he was racing for the rest of his career. He returned to racing in 1949 and won a Formula Two race at the Circuit des Remparts that year.

By 1950, Le Petoulet was successful enough to be offered a works drive for the Gordini team, in the newly formed Formula One World Championship racing series. He competed in Formula One every year until his retirement after the 1964 season. During this long career, Trintignant scored two victories, both at the Monaco Grand Prix, in 1955 and 1958. Unusually for Monaco, both victories came from relatively far down the field, as Trintignant started those races from ninth and fifth respectively. 1954 and 1955 were his best Championship years and he finished fourth in the Drivers' Championship in both.

Trintignant won the 1954 24 Hours of Le Mans with José Froilán González in a Ferrari 375 Plus, despite a seven minutes pitstop with one and a half hour to go, due to a faulty ignition wiring caused by the torrential rain.

Known for his conservative and reliable driving style, Trintignant drove a huge variety of cars, for many different teams: both works and privateer. Unusually, at the 1955 Argentine Grand Prix Trintignant shared both second and third places, a product of the Scuderia Ferrari policy of passing cars to their top drivers, should their original car break down. In 1956, he drove the Bugatti Type 251 in the French Grand Prix, becoming the last driver to represent the famed marque at a Grand Prix race. Even in his final season, driving his own BRM P57, he scored points, taking fifth place at the 1964 German Grand Prix on the intimidating Nürburgring. Between 1959 and 1966, Trintignant held the record for most World Championship Grand Prix starts. Following his retirement from racing, Maurice Trintignant returned to a quiet life as a wine-grower (naming his vintage Le Petoulet), near the town of Vergèze, in the Languedoc-Roussillon wine growing region.

Trintignant competed in the 2000 Historic Grand Prix of Monaco, reunited with the Cooper T45 he had driven to victory there in 1958.

Trintignant died, aged 87, in 2005.

=== Major career wins ===
- Rheinland-Pfalz Preis – 1950
- Mont Ventoux Hill Climb – 1949, 1960, 1964
- Buenos Aires Grand Prix – 1954, 1960
- Swedish Grand Prix – 1956
- RAC Tourist Trophy – 1954
- Circuit des Nations – 1950
- Moroccan Grand Prix – 1956
- Grand Prix Avignon – 1947
- Albi Grand Prix – 1951
- Grand Prix de Caen – 1952, 1954
- Grand Prix de Cadours – 1952, 1953
- Pau Grand Prix – 1958, 1959 (F2), 1962 (F1)
- Grand Prix de Rouen-les-Essarts – 1954
- Grand Prix de Roubaix – 1952
- Grand Prix des Frontières – 1938, 1939, 1953
- 2 Hours of Dakar – 1956
- 12 Hours of Hyères – 1954
- 10 Hours of Messina – 1955
- Monaco Grand Prix – 1955, 1958
- 24 Hours of Le Mans – 1953, 1954

== Racing record ==
=== Complete Formula One World Championship results ===
(key) (Races in bold indicate pole position) (Races in italics indicate fastest lap)

Year	Entrant	Chassis	Engine	1	2	3	4	5	6	7	8	9	10	11	WDC	Pts
1950	Équipe Gordini	Simca-Gordini T15	Gordini 15C 1.5 L4s	GBR	MON; Ret	500	SUI	BEL	FRA	ITA; Ret					NC	0
1951	Équipe Gordini	Simca-Gordini T15	Gordini 15C 1.5 L4s	SUI; DNA	500	BEL	FRA; Ret	GBR	GER; Ret	ITA; DNS	ESP; Ret				NC	0
1952	Écurie Rosier	Ferrari 166 F2	Ferrari 166 2.0 V12	SUI; DNS	500	BEL									16th	2
1952	Équipe Gordini	Simca-Gordini T15	Gordini 1500 1.5 L4				FRA; 5								16th	2
1952	Équipe Gordini	Gordini T16	Gordini 20 2.0 L6					GBR; Ret	GER; Ret	NED; 6	ITA; Ret				16th	2
1953	Équipe Gordini	Gordini T16	Gordini 20 2.0 L6	ARG; 7*	500	NED; 6	BEL; 5	FRA; Ret	GBR; Ret	GER; Ret	SUI; Ret	ITA; 5			12th	4
1954	Écurie Rosier	Ferrari 625	Ferrari 625 2.5 L4	ARG; 4	500										4th	17
1954	Scuderia Ferrari	Ferrari 625	Ferrari 625 2.5 L4			BEL; 2	FRA; Ret	GBR; 5	GER; 3	SUI; Ret	ITA; 5				4th	17
1954	Scuderia Ferrari	Ferrari 553	Ferrari 554 2.5 L4									ESP; Ret			4th	17
1955	Scuderia Ferrari	Ferrari 625	Ferrari 555 2.5 L4	ARG; 2+3†	MON; 1	500			GBR; Ret						4th	11 1/3
1955	Scuderia Ferrari	Ferrari 555	Ferrari 555 2.5 L4				BEL; 6	NED; Ret		ITA; 8					4th	11 1/3
1956	Vandervell Products Ltd	Vanwall VW 2	Vanwall 254 2.5 L4	ARG	MON; Ret	500	BEL; Ret		GBR; Ret	GER	ITA; Ret				NC	0
1956	Automobiles Bugatti	Bugatti T251	Bugatti 2.5 L8					FRA; Ret							NC	0
1957	Scuderia Ferrari	Ferrari 801	Ferrari DS50 2.5 V8	ARG	MON; 5	500	FRA; Ret	GBR; 4‡	GER	PES	ITA				13th	5
1958	R.R.C. Walker Racing Team	Cooper T45	Climax FPF 2.0 L4	ARG	MON; 1	NED; 9	500				GER; 3		ITA; Ret	MOR; Ret	7th	12
1958	Scuderia Centro Sud	Maserati 250F	Maserati 250F1 2.5 L6					BEL; 7							7th	12
1958	Owen Racing Organisation	BRM P25	BRM P25 2.5 L4						FRA; Ret						7th	12
1958	R.R.C. Walker Racing Team	Cooper T43	Climax FPF 2.0 L4							GBR; 8		POR; 8			7th	12
1959	R.R.C. Walker Racing Team	Cooper T51	Climax FPF 2.5 L4	MON; 3	500	NED; 8	FRA; 11	GBR; 5	GER; 4	POR; 4	ITA; 9	USA; 2			5th	19
1960	R.R.C. Walker Racing Team	Cooper T51	Climax FPF 2.5 L4	ARG; 3											NC	0
1960	Scuderia Centro Sud	Cooper T51	Maserati 250S 2.5 L4		MON; Ret	500	NED; Ret	BEL	FRA; Ret				USA; 15		NC	0
1960	David Brown Corporation	Aston Martin DBR5	Aston Martin RB6 2.5 L6							GBR; 11	POR	ITA			NC	0
1961	Scuderia Serenissima	Cooper T51	Maserati Tipo 6 1.5 L4	MON; 7	NED	BEL; Ret	FRA; 13	GBR	GER; Ret	ITA; 9	USA				NC	0
1962	R.R.C. Walker Racing Team	Lotus 24	Climax FWMV 1.5 V8	NED; WD	MON; Ret	BEL; 8	FRA; 7	GBR; WD	GER; Ret	ITA; Ret	USA; Ret	RSA			NC	0
1963	Reg Parnell Racing	Lola Mk4A	Climax FWMV 1.5 V8	MON; Ret	BEL	NED									NC	0
1963	Reg Parnell Racing	Lotus 24	Climax FWMV 1.5 V8				FRA; 8	GBR	GER						NC	0
1963	Scuderia Centro Sud	BRM P57	BRM P56 1.5 V8							ITA; 9	USA	MEX	RSA		NC	0
1964	Maurice Trintignant	BRM P57	BRM P56 1.5 V8	MON; Ret	NED	BEL	FRA; 11	GBR; DNQ	GER; 5	AUT; DNA	ITA; Ret	USA	MEX		16th	2

* Indicates shared drive with Harry Schell
† Indicates shared drives with José Froilán González and Giuseppe Farina (2nd place) & Giuseppe Farina and Umberto Maglioli (3rd place)
‡ Indicates shared drive with Peter Collins

=== Complete 24 Hours of Le Mans results ===
Year	Team	Co-Drivers	Car	Class	Laps	Pos.	Class Pos.
1950	(France) Automobiles Gordini	(France) Robert Manzon	Gordini T15S Coupé	S 3.0	34	DNF (Water radiator)	
1951	(France) Équipe Gordini	(France) Jean Behra	Gordini T15S	S 1.5	49	DNF (Ignition)	
1952	(France) Écurie Rosier	(France) Louis Rosier	Ferrari 340 America Spyder	S 5.0		DNF (Clutch)	
1953	(France) Automobiles Gordini	(United States) Harry Schell	Gordini T26S	S 3.0	293	6th	**1st**
1954	(Italy) Scuderia Ferrari	(Argentina) José Froilán González	Ferrari 375 Plus	S 5.0	302	**1st**	**1st**
1955	(Italy) Scuderia Ferrari	(United States) Harry Schell	Ferrari 735 LM	S 5.0	107	DNF (Clutch)	
1956	(Italy) Scuderia Ferrari	(Belgium) Olivier Gendebien	Ferrari 625 LM Touring	S 3.0	293	**3rd**	**2nd**
1957	(Italy) Scuderia Ferrari	(Belgium) Olivier Gendebien	Ferrari 250 TR	S 5.0	109	DNF (Piston)	
1958	(United Kingdom) David Brown Racing Dept.	(United Kingdom) Tony Brooks	Aston Martin DBR1/300	S 3.0	173	DNF (Gearbox)	
1959	(United Kingdom) David Brown Racing Dept.	(Belgium) Paul Frère	Aston Martin DBR1/300	S 3.0	322	**2nd**	**2nd**
1960	(West Germany) Porsche KG	(West Germany) Hans Herrmann	Porsche 718 RS 60	S 2.0	57	DNF (Piston)	
1961	(Italy) Scuderia Serenissima	(Italy) Carlo Maria Abate	Ferrari 250 GT SWB	GT 3.0	162	DNF (Transmission)	
1962	Maserati France	(Belgium) Lucien Bianchi	Maserati Tipo 151/1	E +3.0	152	DNF (Suspension)	
1964	Maserati France	(France) André Simon	Maserati Tipo 151/3	P 5.0	99	DNF (Electrical)	
1965	Ford France S.A.	(France) Guy Ligier	Ford GT40 Roadster	P 5.0	11	DNF (Gearbox)	

=== Complete 12 Hours of Sebring results ===
Year	Team	Co-Drivers	Car	Class	Laps	Pos.	Class Pos.
1957	(Italy) Ferrari Factory	(United Kingdom) Peter Collins	Ferrari 315 S	S5.0	187	6th	5th

=== Complete British Saloon Car Championship results ===
(key) (Races in bold indicate pole position; races in italics indicate fastest lap.)

Year	Team	Car	Class	1	2	3	4	5	6	7	8	Pos.	Pts	Class
1962	Ford Motor Company	Ford Zodiac Mk 3	C	SNE	GOO	AIN	SIL ?	CRY	AIN	BRH	OUL	22nd	6	**3rd**

== Trivia ==
- He was awarded the Légion d’Honneur in 1960
- Was the mayor of Vergèze between 1958 and 1964.
- Was married to Louise on 10 December 1938
- Took over his father's vineyard
- On 10 October 2010 a bronze statue of a Bugatti Type 51 was unveiled in Sainte-Cécile-les-Vignes in his honour

== Notes ==
Sporting positions
Preceded by Tony Rolt; Duncan Hamilton	Winner of the 24 Hours of Le Mans; 1954; With: José Froilán González	Succeeded by Mike Hawthorn; Ivor Bueb
Records
Preceded by Stirling Moss; 67 entries, 66 starts (1951–1961)	Most Grand Prix entries 84 entries, 82 starts (1950–1964); 68th at the 1961 French GP	Succeeded by Jack Brabham; 128 entries, 126 starts 85th at the 1966 Monaco GP
