= 1956 10 Hours of Messina =

← Previous race	Next race →
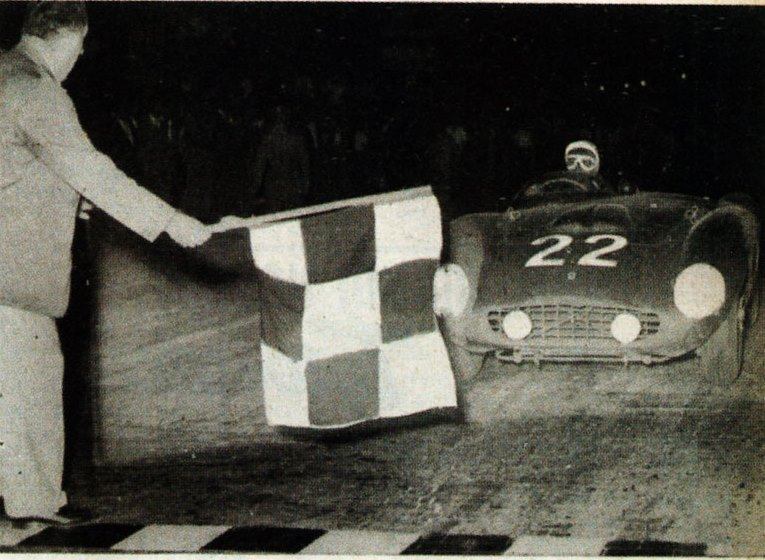
- The race director Renzo Castagneto flies the chess flag to the winner Phil Hill on Ferrari.

Race details
- Date: 26 August 1956
- Official name: 10 Hours of Messina
- Location: Messina, Italy
- Distance: 157 laps, 584,221 km

Fastest lap
Driver	(United States) Phil Hill	Ferrari 500TR
- Time: 3:15 on lap (123.690 km/h)

Podium
First	(United States) Phil Hill	Ferrari 500TR
Second	(Portugal) António Borges Barreto	Ferrari
Third	(Italy) Franco Bordoni	Maserati 300S

The 4th 10 Hours of Messina was a sports car race, held on 26 August 1956 in the street circuit of Messina, Italy.

In this edition Automobile Club d'Italia to avoid the cancellation he decided to reduce the race to only 5 hours starting at 20 and arriving at 1 in the night, moreover, the route has been reduced by about a kilometer to free the transit for the Regina Margherita hospital.

== Final standings ==
- Started: 24
- Classified: 11

#	Drivers	Team	Average speed	Cause of retirement
1.	(United States) Phil Hill	Ferrari 500 TR	116.844 km/h	
2.	(Italy) Franco Bordoni	Maserati 300S		
3.	(Portugal) António Borges Barreto	Ferrari		
4.	(Italy) Franco Cortese	Ferrari 500 TR		
5.	(Italy) Canova	Ferrari		
6.	(Brazil) Chico Landi (Italy) Gerino Gerini	Maserati 200S		
7.	(Italy) Alotta (Italy) Alfonso Vella	Maserati 200S		
8.	(Italy) Aurelio Garavaglia	Maserati 150S		
9.	(United Kingdom) Bob Hicks (Sweden) Jo Bonnier	Lotus Eleven		
10.	(Italy) Mario Ricci	Gordini 3.0		
11.	(Italy) Mario Piccolo	Giaur 750		
not classified	(Switzerland) Benoit Musy	Maserati		Last lap too long
DNF	(Sweden) Jo Bonnier	Alfa Romeo 6CM 3000		Accident
DNF	(Italy) Gerino Gerini	?		
DNF	(Germany) Hans Herrmann	Porsche		
DNF	(Italy) Piero Carini	Ferrari 500 TR		
DNF	(Italy) Munaron	?		
DNF	(United States) Herbert Mackay-Fraser	Ferrari 750 Monza		
DNF	(Italy) Gaetano Starrabba	Ferrari 500 TR		

== See also ==
- Messina Grand Prix (auto race that replaced it)
