= 10 Hours of Messina =

- The street circuit of Messina
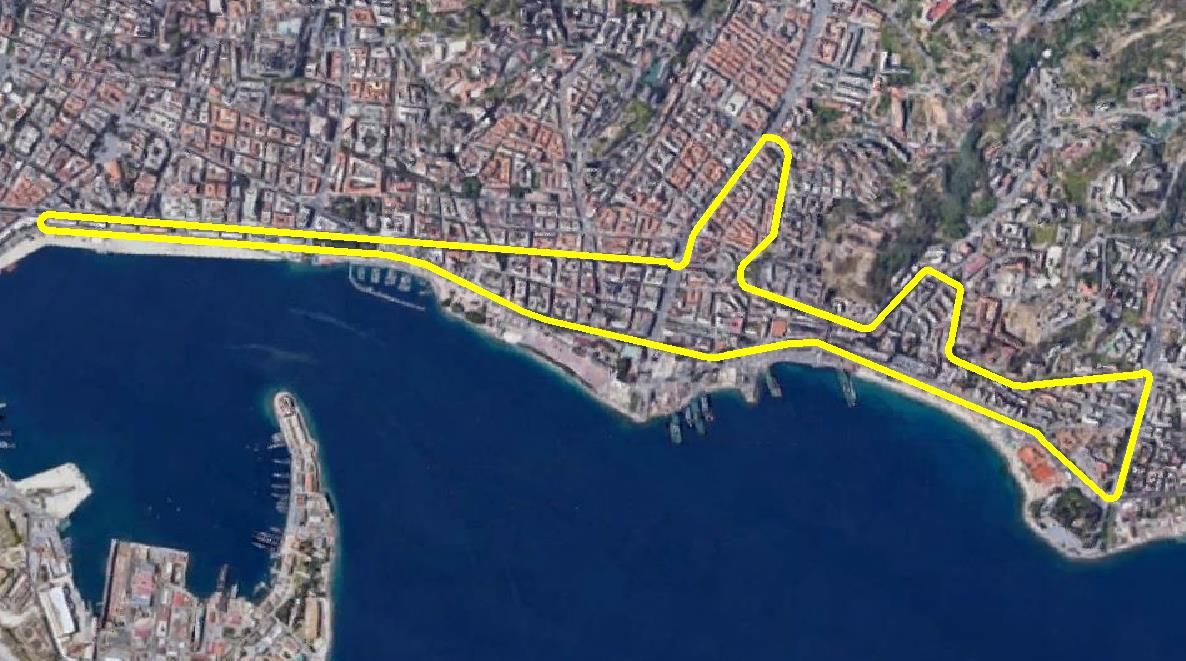

Race information
- Number of times held: 6
- First held: 1952
- Last held: 1958
- Most wins (drivers): (Italy) Eugenio Castellotti (2)
- Most wins (constructors): (Italy) Ferrari (4)
- Circuit length: 7.650 km

The 10 Hours of Messina (Italian: 10 ore di Messina or 10 ore notturna messinese) was a sports car race, organized by the Automobile Club d'Italia, held for the first time on 24 August 1952 in the street circuit of Messina, Italy. From 1959 it was replaced by Messina Grand Prix.

== Editions ==
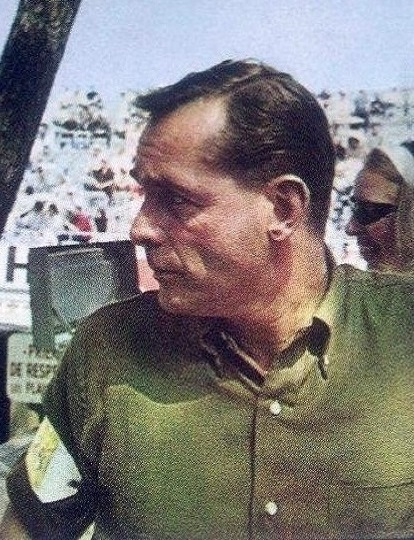
The American 1961 Formula One world champion Phil Hill won the race in 1956 driving a Ferrari.

Year	Laps	Total distance	Length of a lap	Winners	Team	Notes
1952		982.800 km		(Italy) Clemente Biondetti (Italy) Franco Cornacchia	Ferrari 212 MM	
1953	144 laps	1102.043 km	7.6531 km	(Italy) Eugenio Castellotti (Italy) Giulio Musitelli	Ferrari 250 MM	
1954	144 laps	1096.870 km	7.716 km	(Italy) Roberto Sgorbati (Italy) Giuseppe Sgorbati	Osca 2000S	
1955	157 laps	1202.300 km	7.650 km	(France) Maurice Trintignant (Italy) Eugenio Castellotti	Ferrari 750 Monza	
1956	87 laps	584.221 km	6.700 km	(United States) Phil Hill	Ferrari 500 TR	(Note: This edition was of 5 hours and not 10.)
1957	not held					
1958	230 laps	1382.028 km	6.020 km	(United Kingdom) Christian Heins (West Germany) Paul-Ernst Strähle	Porsche 550 RS	(Note: The race was run on a different circuit, the Ganzirri Lake circuit.)

== See also ==
- Messina Grand Prix (auto race that replaced it)
