= Ugo Zagato =

Italian automobile designer (1890–1968)

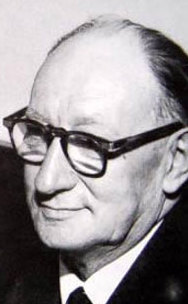
- Born: 25 June 1890; Gavello, Kingdom of Italy
- Died: 31 October 1968 (aged 78); Gavello, Italy
- Occupation: Automobile designer
- Known for: Founder of Zagato

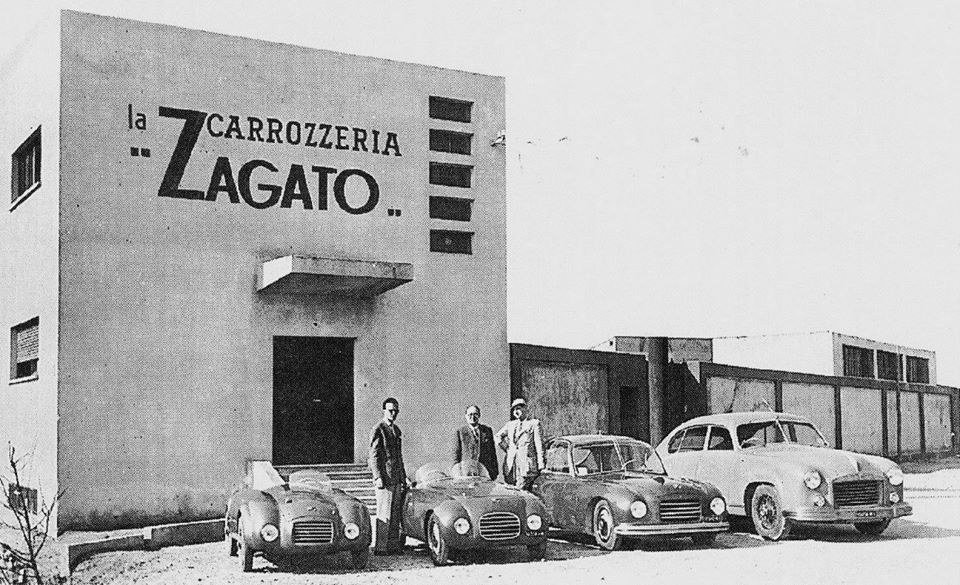
Ugo and Elio Zagato pictured with Fiat and Isotta Fraschini automobiles (1947/8)

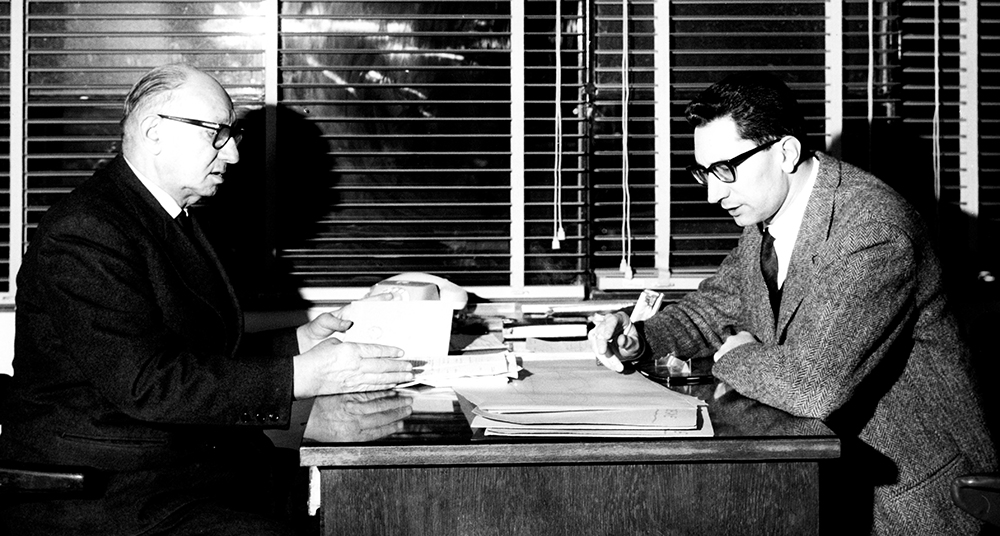
Ugo and his son Gianni in the 1960s

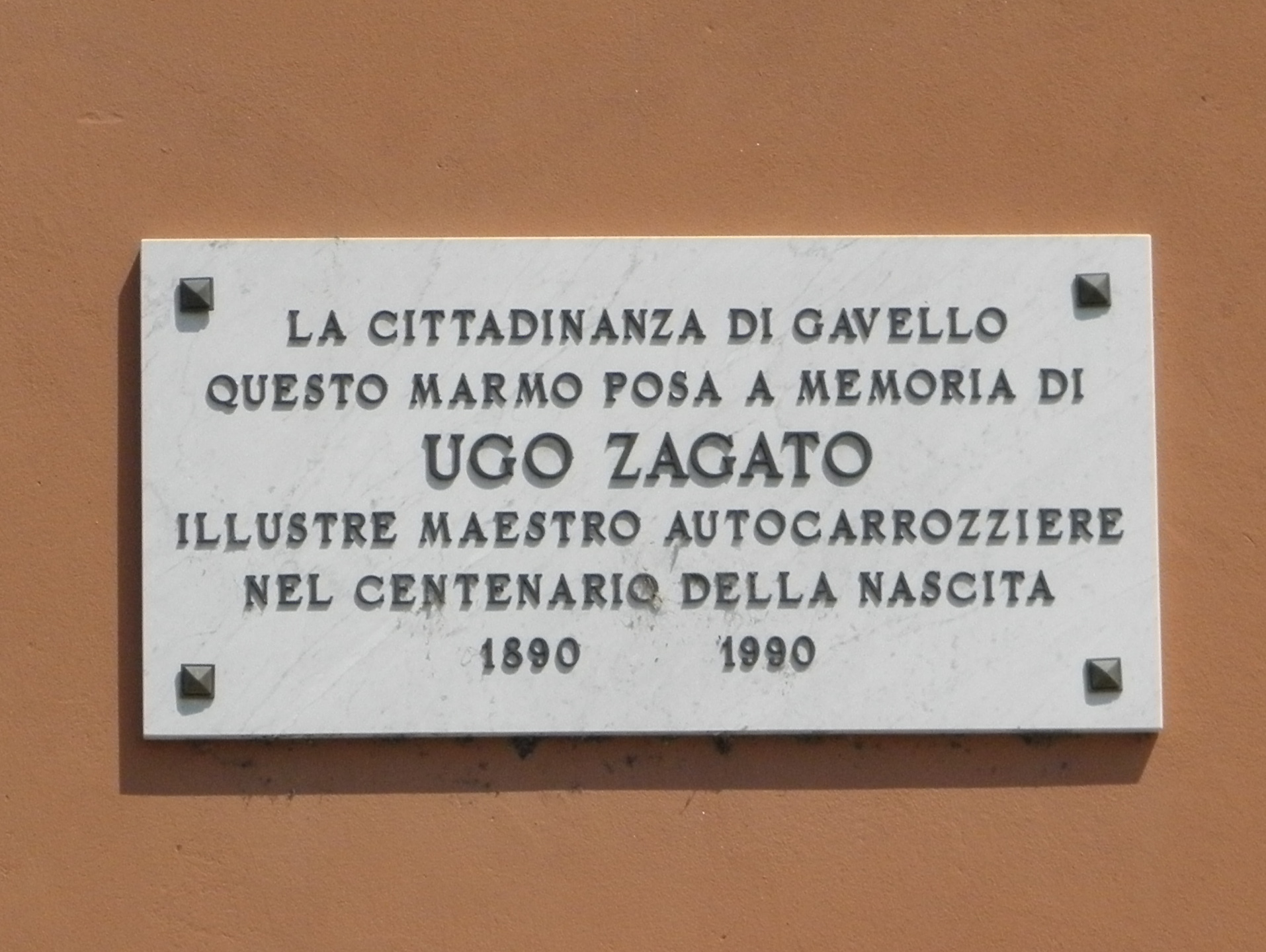
Palazzo Grimani, Ugo Zagato plaque (Gavello)

Ugo Zagato (25 June 1890, in Gavello – 31 October 1968) was an Italian automobile designer, known for establishing and running the Zagato coachbuilder, famous for its lightweight designs.

He had five brothers and lost his father (1905), forcing him to emigrate to Germany and metalworks employment in Köln (1905). He returned to serve in the military (1909) and joined car coachbuilder Carrozzeria Varesina in Varese, while studying at the Santa Maria design school. During World War I, he moved to Turin and joined the Pomilio aircraft manufacturer, learning lightweight body construction (1915–1919). He established Carrozzeria Ugo Zagato & Co., a workshop in Milan (1919), where he built close ties with Alfa Romeo. His workshop was destroyed and rebuilt as La Zagato outside Milan after World War II, joined in 1946 by his sons Elio Zagato (1921–2009), and Gianni Zagato (1929–2020). Ugo's sons continued operations after his death in 1968.

== Awards ==
- Compasso d'Oro 1960 for the Fiat-Abarth 1000 Zagato
