= Elio Zagato =

Italian automobile designer

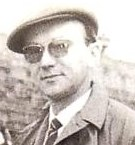
- Died: 14 September 2009

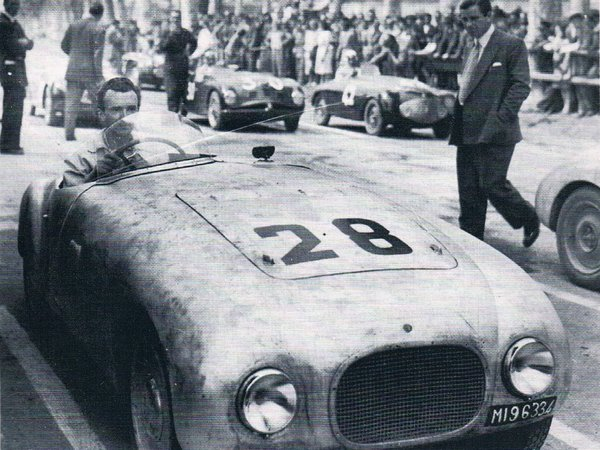
Zagato behind the wheel of a Fiat 750 Sport Zagato (1947)

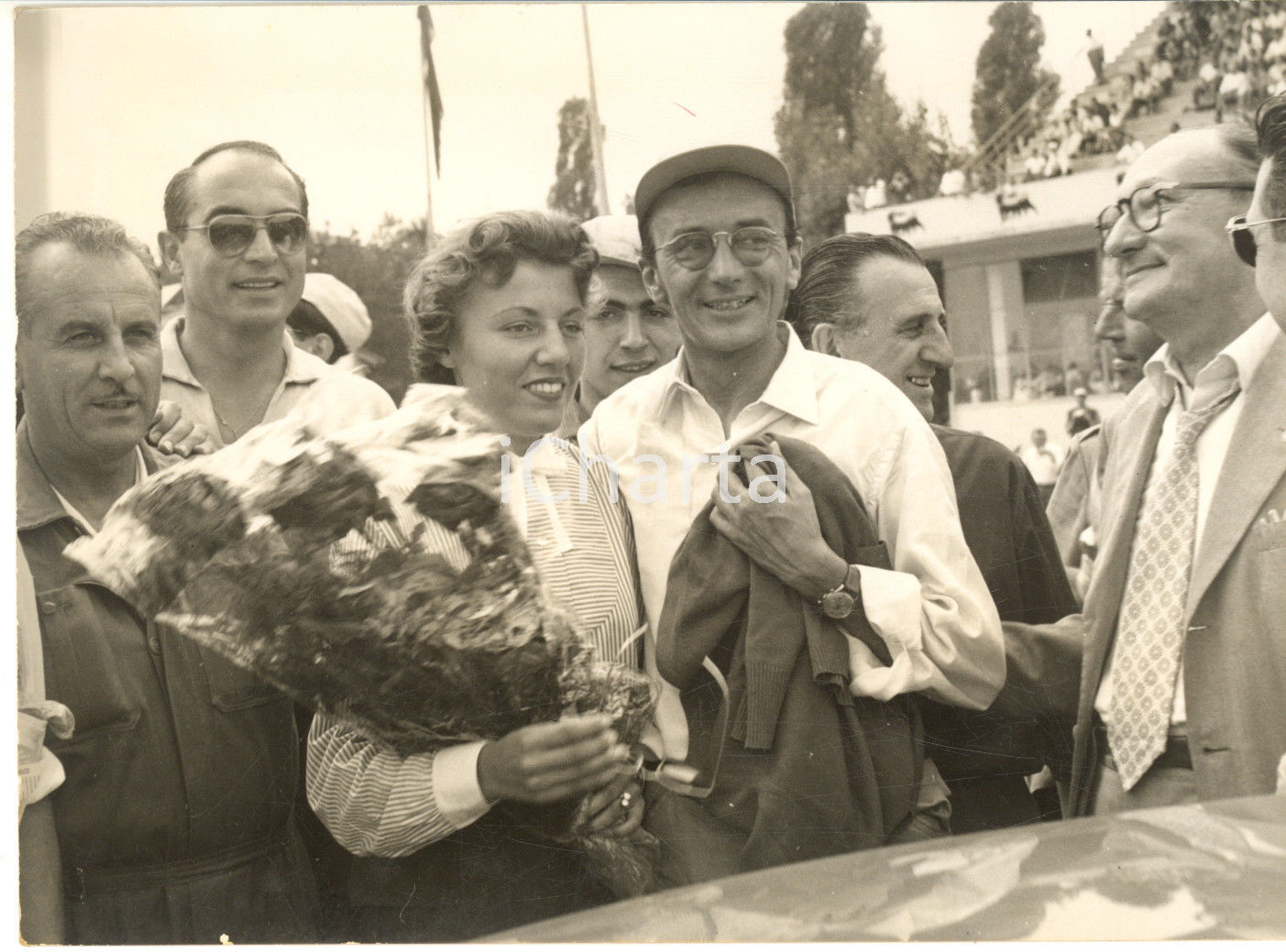
Zagato after winning the Coppa Intereuropa in 1954. His father Ugo is to the right.

Elio Zagato (27 February 1921 – 14 September 2009) was an Italian automobile designer.

Like his younger brother Gianni Zagato (1929–2020), Elio Zagato was passionate about coachbuilding and joined his father Ugo Zagato's design firm Zagato in Milan. Upon Ugo's death in 1968, Elio took over the company's management.

Zagato also raced cars and was one of the founders of Scuderia Ambrosiana in Milan. He won the Targa Florio in 1959, the Coppa Inter-Europa in 1954, the Dolomites Gold Cup Race and the Berlin Avus Cup in 1955 as well as five GT series.

Elio's son, Andrea Zagato, took charge of the family business in 2019, jointly with his wife Marella Rivolta-Zagato, daughter to Piero Rivolta of the carmaker Iso Automoveicoli S.p.A.

Zagato's autobiography Storie di corse e non solo (Racing stories and more) was published in 2002.
