= Ferrari 212 Export =

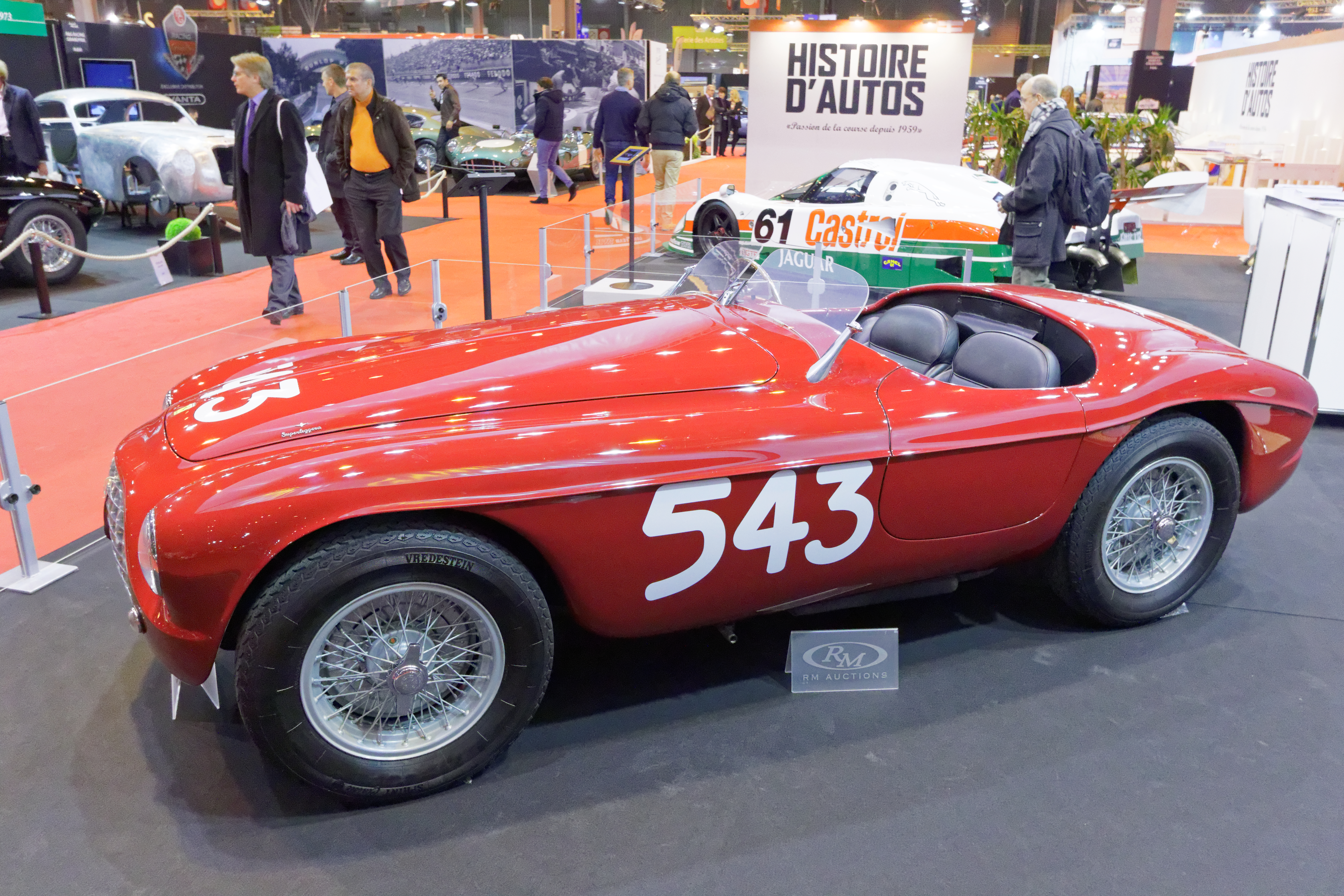
- Ferrari 212 Export Touring Barchetta

Overview
- Manufacturer: Ferrari
- Production: 1951–1952; 27 produced
- Designer: Touring; Giovanni Michelotti at Vignale

Body and chassis
- Class: Sports car
- Body style: Berlinetta; Barchetta; Spyder
- Layout: Front mid-engine, rear-wheel-drive

Powertrain
- Engine: 2.6 L (2562.51 cc) Colombo V12
- Power output: 150/165 PS
- Transmission: 5-speed manual

Dimensions
- Wheelbase: 2,250 mm (88.6 in)
- Curb weight: 850 kg (1,874 lb) (dry, berlinetta)

Chronology
- Predecessor: Ferrari 195 S
- Successor: Ferrari 225 S

See also the 212 Inter grand tourer

The Ferrari 212 Export was a sports racing car produced by Ferrari in 1951–1952. The 212 Exports won Tour de France automobile, Giro di Sicilia, Coppa della Toscana, 10 Hours of Messina and other motor races throughout its career. It was meant to be a sports car available for oversea markets.

== Development ==
The Ferrari 212 Export was an evolution over the preceding 195 S in terms of engine capacity and new chassis. The 212 Export was a race model produced alongside a road-going version, the 212 Inter. The "Export" name first appeared on the 166 Export Vignale Spyder s/n 0072E, from the 166 MM range, and was adopted for the racing 212-series instead of the usual "Sport" moniker. Twenty-seven 212 Exports were built, most of them used in competition.

=== Bodywork ===
Most bodies of the 212 Export range came from the Ferrari's chosen coachbuilder, Carrozzeria Touring. Classic Touring Barchetta shape graced a total of eight cars, while another four received a closed berlinetta body style. One particular Touring Barchetta s/n 0102E was re-bodied by Carrozzeria Autodromo between 1953 and 1954, when it was acquired by Fox Studios in Hollywood, California, used in the 1955 movie The Racers with Kirk Douglas and Bella Darvi, directed by Henry Hathaway. It was later raced in the 1954 Mille Miglia to gather footage for another movie, the 1961 The Green Helmet with Sid James and Bill Travers.

Carrozzeria Vignale created ten competition bodies in total. Three open-top spiders and seven closed Berlinetta to a Giovanni Michelotti design. Carrozzeria Motto bodied only a handful of Ferraris, including two examples of the 212 Export. One spyder s/n 0094E and one berlinetta s/n 0074E were created to a Rocco Motto design. The spyder featured triple headlights and was owned by an Italian racing driver Piero Scotti before ending up in Argentina. There was a single Paolo Fontana creation in the form of a spyder, s/n 0086E. The body was an open style described as a "carretto siciliano" or "Sicilian cart" with cycle-fenders. Scuderia Marzotto ordered a bare chassis from Ferrari and commissioned the coachwork to Carrozzeria Fontana from Padova. After the Giro di Sicilia, the first body was soon converted by Vignale into a regular spyder of their style. This, in turn, was re-bodied as a three-door station wagon by Fontana to serve as a support car in Carrera Panamericana. Before the 1952 Giro di Sicilia, 0086E received yet another spyder body, this time also by Fontana, with regular fenders but very narrow and unswept flanks.

=== Notable examples ===
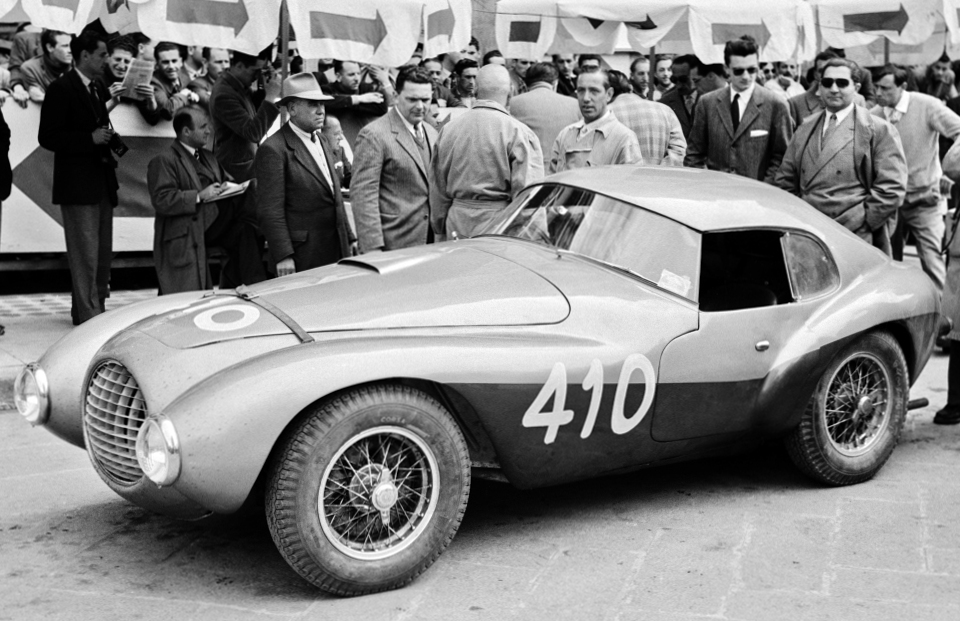
Ferrari 166 MM/212 Export "l'Uovo". Created from a crashed 166 MM chassis with a new 212 Export-sourced engine and re-bodied by Fontana.

Some earlier cars from the 166 MM range were converted into the 212 specifications. One such example, s/n 024MB, was recreated after a serious accident in which the car was split into two parts. In 1950, the recreated chassis received new bodywork designed by Franco Reggiani for Count Giannino Marzotto, executed by Carrozzeria Fontana and a year later, a new 2.6-litre engine from 212 Export s/n 0084E. Due to the unusual shape of the car, it was called "l'Uovo", which means "the egg". Because it raced with the 212-spec engine, its competition history and victories are counted towards the 212 Exports.

Not all 212 Exports were race cars. Vignale created further two convertibles as a strictly road-going car. The first s/n 0106E, was owned by Count Sanseverino. The second s/n 0110E was ordered by Jorge da Cunha d'Almeida Araujo, the Portuguese Ambassador in France. One of the competition bodied spyders, s/n 0076E, presented as the Turin Motor Show car, was possibly at one time owned by Roberto Rossellini and has never raced. S/n 0098E was created as a Vignale Coupé and later re-bodied as an open-top spyder with additional headrest. This example also never saw racing.

Some examples were further converted to 225-specification by upgrading to a 2.7 L engine. Cars with chassis numbers 0104E, 0112E and 0158ED were some of them.

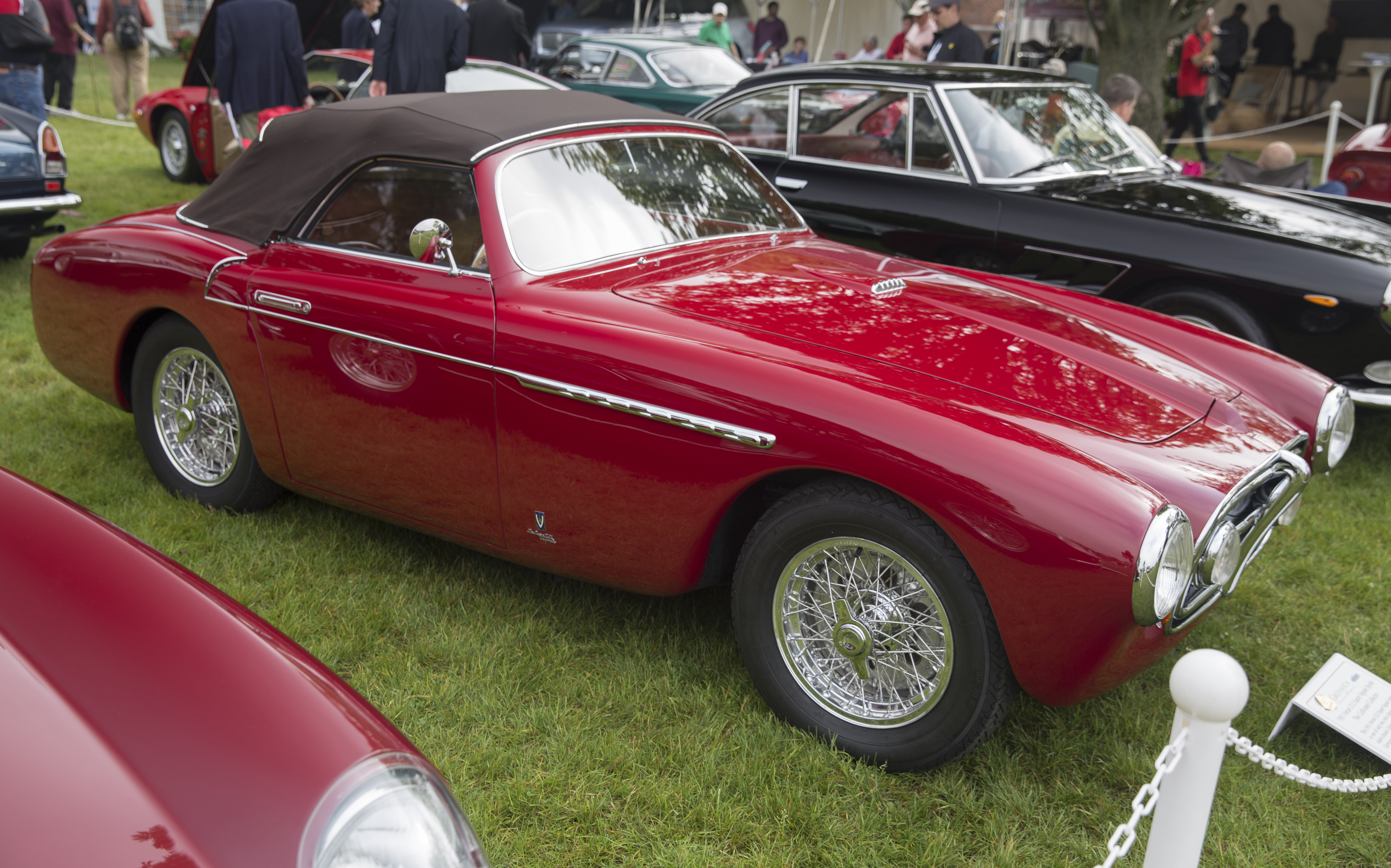
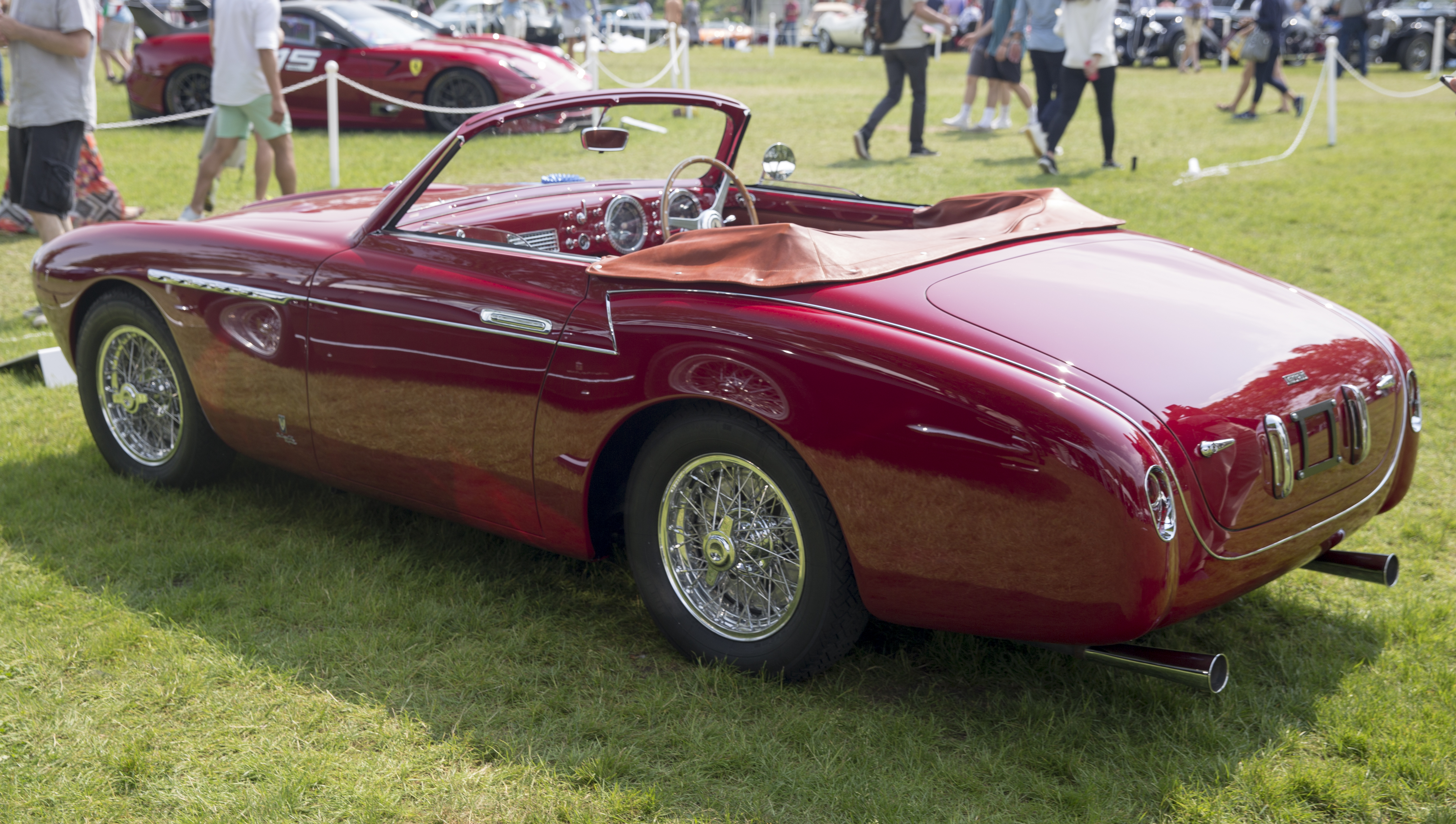
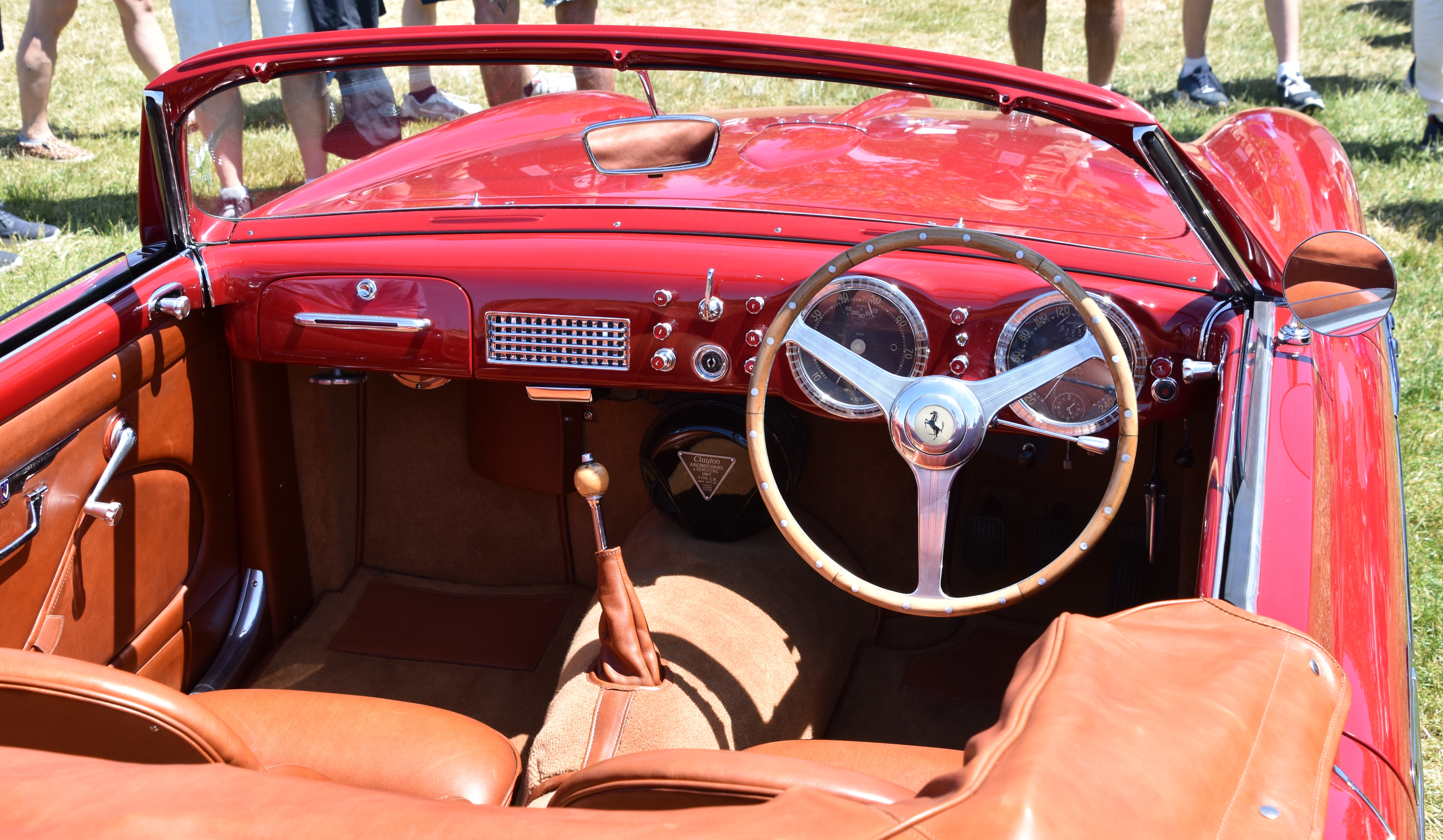
Ferrari 212 Export Vignale Cabriolet

=== 212 MM ===
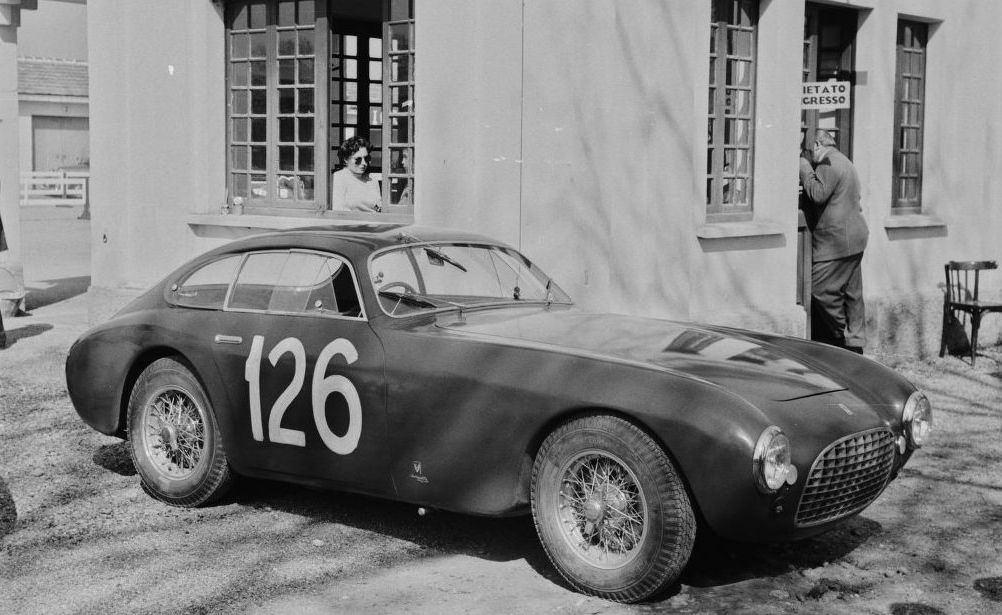
Ferrari 212 MM Vignale Berlinetta

The 1951 Ferrari 212 MM was the first example of the series, that was later renamed as 212 Export. S/n 0070M was bodied as a berlinetta by Vignale and owned by Franco Cornacchia of Scuderia Guastalla. It was the only Export to be named "Mille Miglia" by the factory and the only to sport an "M" in its chassis number suffix. The biggest difference over the succeeding examples of the series was the carburettors setup, made up of a triple four-barrel Webers. In April 1952, just before the Mille Miglia race, the car received an updated new bodywork, still in Vignale Berlinetta form, with a recessed grille and had portholes in fenders installed before Le Mans. The 212 MM was raced throughout 1955 up until the fatal accident of Giovanni Brinci during Mille Miglia. In 1995 it was offered for US$349,000 and is since owned by a former Microsoft president, Jon Shirley.

== Specifications ==
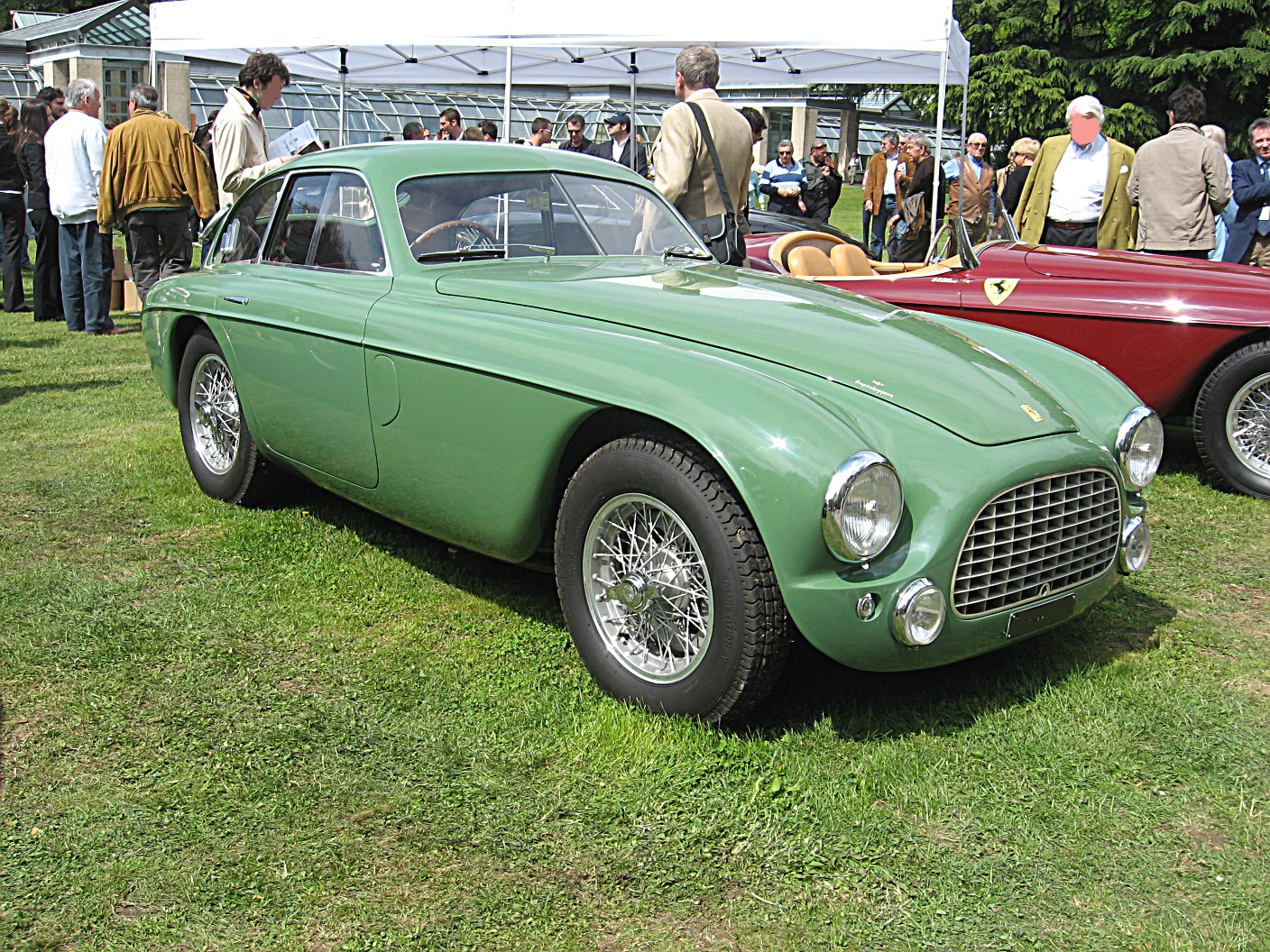
Ferrari 212 Export Touring Berlinetta

=== Engine and transmission ===
The Ferrari 212 Export was powered by the SOHC, 2-valve per cylinder, Colombo V12 engine with increased capacity compared to the preceding model. Now the internal measurements were 68 by 58.8 mm (2.7 by 2.3 in) of bore and stroke. The total displacement was 2,562.51 cc (2.6 L; 156.4 cu in). With 8.4:1 compression ratio, maximum power output ranged from 150 PS (110 kW; 148 hp) at 6500 up to 165 PS (121 kW; 163 hp) at 7000 rpm, depending on the carburettors setup. Fuel was fed to the engine by three Weber 32DCF carburettors or alternatively three Weber 36DCF setup. The exception was the 212 MM with triple quad-barrel Webers and some early examples with only a single carburettor. The ignition system was made of a single spark plug per cylinder served by two coils. Engine lubrication was by a wet sump arrangement. Transmission was a 5-speed and non-synchronised.

=== Chassis and suspension ===
The chassis of the 212 Export was a new construction, still utilising steel tubes, elliptical in section. Later models could be equipped with a Gilco-designed Tuboscocca trellis frame, constructed out of smaller diameter tubes for increased rigidity. The wheelbase was the same as on the 195 S model, measuring 2,250 mm (88.6 in).

The front suspension setup was independent with double wishbones and transverse leaf springs. Front shock absorbers were hydraulic of a Houdaille type. At the rear was a live axle with semi-elliptic springs and Houdaille hydraulic shock absorbers. Brakes were of a hydraulic drum type, all-round. The fuel tank had a capacity of 120 litres.

== Racing ==
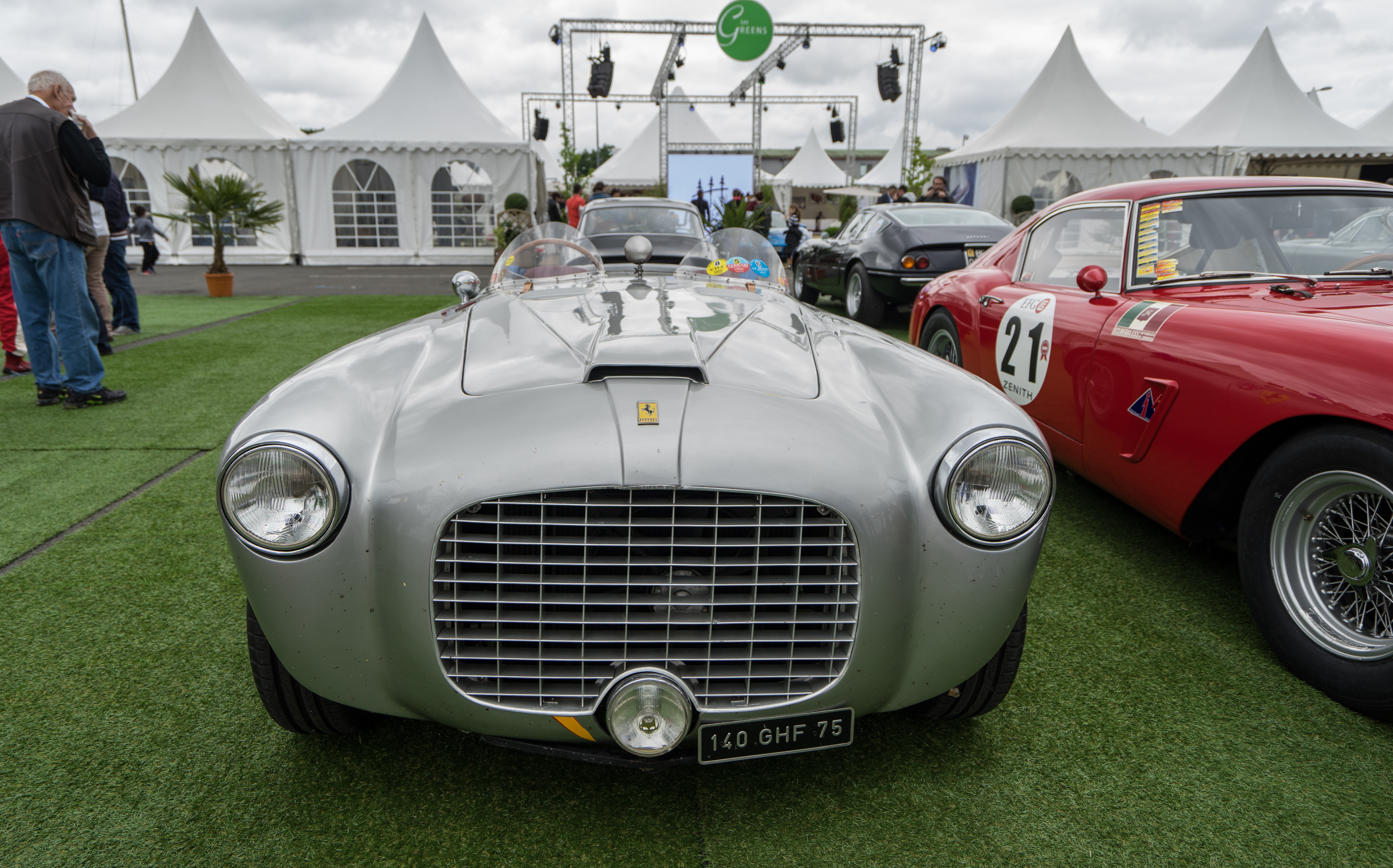
Motto Spyder with triple headlights

The first outing and also the first success came at the 1951 Giro di Sicilia race. Three 212 Exports were entered, and one of them won. Vittorio Marzotto and Paolo Fontana won the race in a Fontana Spyder s/n 0086E, entered by Scuderia Marzotto. The second victory was achieved by the 212 MM entered in the Coppa Inter-Europa, in the +1.5 class. Luigi Villoresi won the race and set a fastest lap. His average speed was 153,870 km/h. For the Mille Miglia race of the same year four 212 Exports were entered. Only two managed to finish the race. Giannino Marzotto and Marco Crosara led the first half of the race with their 166/212 Export Fontana Berlinetta before retiring with a flat tyre. The 212 MM was 17th overall, driven by Franco Cornacchia and Guido Mariani of Scuderia Guastella. Motto-bodied spyder, s/n 0094E, was third overall and second in the +2.0 class. Drivers were Piero Scotti and A. Ruspaggiari.

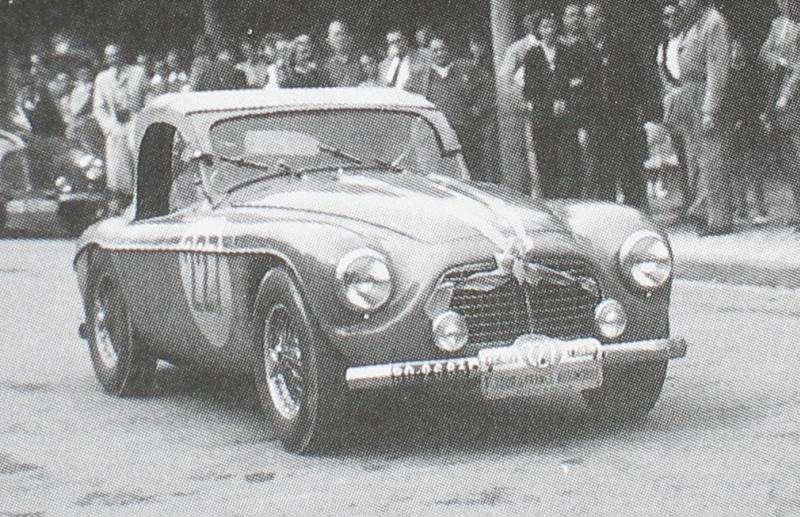
Pierre "Pagnibon" Boncompagni won the 1951 Tour de France automobile in 212 Export Touring Barchetta

III. Coppa della Toscana, held in 1951, was won by the 212 Export, s/n 024MB that was converted from the destroyed 166 MM and re-bodied by Carrozzeria Fontana. Giannino Marzotto and Marco Crosara drove their berlinetta with Scuderia Marzotto. Piero Scotti finished the race in third place in his Motto Spyder. Franco Cornacchia and Del Carlo also finished the race in the 212 MM. Cornacchia later entered the Coppa d'Oro delle Dolomiti, but he did not finish the race. Scuderia Marzotto fielded a single 212 Export Vignale Spyder for the Circuito do Porto and managed to finish second overall, behind much more powerful 340 America, with Vittorio Marzotto behind the wheel.

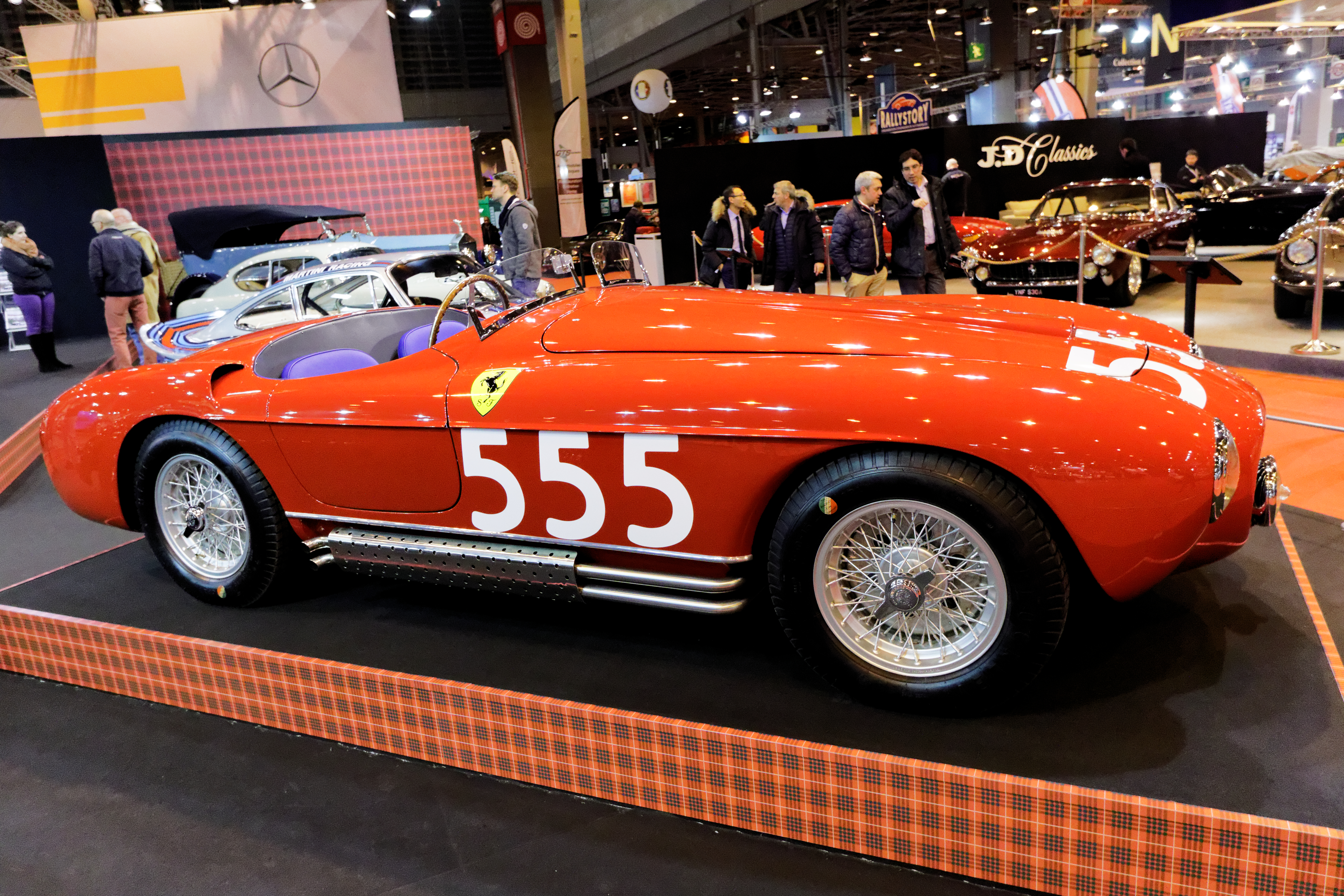
Autodromo Spyder that starred in "The Racers" movie

For the 1951 24 Hours of Le Mans three 212 Exports were fielded, all privately entered. The best result was by a Vignale Berlinetta s/n 096E, driven by Norbert Jean Mahé and Jacques Péron. They finished ninth overall and fourth in S+3.0 class. Charles Moran Jr. with Franco Cornacchia scored 16th place in their Touring Barchetta s/n 0100E, renumbered to 0067S. The race was not devoid of tragic moments when Touring Barchetta s/n 0078E of Jean Larivière and André Guelfi spun out of Tertre Rouge and instantly killed Larivière on his fifth lap of the race. Next victory came at the Vila Real circuit in Portugal. Giovanni Bracco won the race setting the fastest lap time in his Vignale Spyder. Later the same year at the Giro delle Calabria, Pietro Palmieri and Vallecchi scored a second place and won their S+1.1 class. It was the first race of the Touring Barchetta destined to be a film star. Umberto Marzotto also won the XII. Trieste-Opicina hillclimb

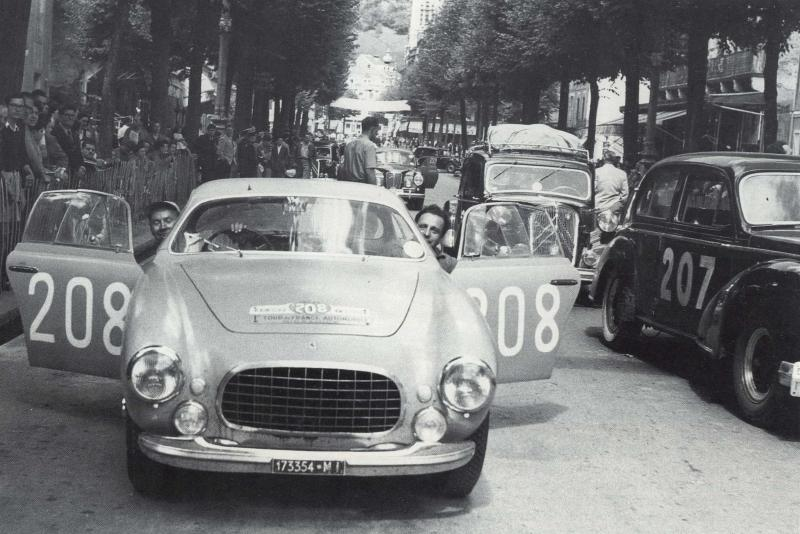
Jacques Péron drove this Ferrari 212 Export Vignale Coupé to a 2nd place at 1951 Tour de France

In 1951, four Exports were entered in the Targa Florio race. Scuderia Marzotto fielded two cars, and one of them, s/n 0086E, still bodied as a Vignale Spyder, driven by Franco Cornacchia, came second overall, also setting the fastest lap time. None of the remaining three cars finished the race. The most important victory for the 212 Export came at the 1951 Tour de France automobile race. It was the first instalment of this French marathon. Three Exports were fielded, and all three finished the gruelling twelve-day race. Not only that, they scored 1-2-3 victory. The overall winners were Pierre "Pagnibon" Boncompagni and Alfred Barraquet with their Touring Barchetta s/n 0078E, covered with a soft-top. Second place went to Jacques Péron and R. Bertramnier in Vignale Berlinetts s/n 0096E. Finally Elio Checcacci with Harry Schell scored the third place, driving a one-off Motto Berlinetta s/n 0074E.

The first major race of the 1952 season for the 212 Export was the Mille Miglia. Four Exports were ented, but only one managed to finish the race. Franco Cornacchia, aided by Tinarelli and driving the 212 MM, ended up in 20th place. At the Coppa della Toscana, later the same year, the 212 MM did not win the race but won its GT class with Cornacchia and Del Carlo. For the 1952 24 Hours of Le Mans, the 212 MM was privately entered by an American Charles Moran Jr., who teamed up with Cornacchia for the race. Their car retired after 12 hours with electrical problems. For the Targa Florio two Exports were entered. The Touring Barchetta of Luigi Bordonaro was the only one to finish the race, in 10th place and third in class. His car drove with an upgraded rear axle from 340 America. For the 1952 12 Hours of Pescara Franco Cornacchia teamed up with a Mille Miglia veteran Clemente Biondetti. Their 212 MM managed to finish the endurance race on a second place. A couple of days later Cornacchia won the Trullo d'Oro, also known as the 2 Hours of Pescara.

Another endurance race in the 1952 season was the 10 Hours of Messina. Cornacchia again paired with Biondetti in the 212 MM, whilst Carlo Gazzabini and Ferraguti drove the Motto Berlinetta. Cornachia and Biondetti won the race and the other Export was second overall. The 1952 Gran Premio di Pergusa was won by Luigi Bordonaro who also achieved a fastest lap time in the Touring Barchetta. He contested many minor races throughout 1952–1955, with multiple victories, before passing the car to Edouard Margairaz. The 212 MM again contested the Coppa Inter-Europa, this time driven by Franco Cornacchia. He scored a second place and a fastest lap. The last major race of the 1952 season was the Carrera Panamericana. One American team fielded their 212 Export for this grueling Mexican marathon. Phil Hill and Arnold Stubbs drove their Vignale Berlinetta, s/n 0092E to a sixth place overall. Hans-Karl von Tscharner raced his Touring Barchetta s/n 0134E over numerous Hillclimb events between 1952 and 1956, scoring ten victories, including five in class.

== Collectability ==
The Ferrari 212 Exports are highly sought-after collector's cars. Many have racing pedigree and company's reputation from the success of its race cars. There were many different body styles and coachbuilders. Many collectors are searching for an early V12-engines Touring Barchetta that was purposely built for racing. An early Ferrari's ownership allows for participation in historic rallies and races. Auction prices of 212 Exports have risen in recent years. The 212 Export Motto Spyder was estimated CHF2.8-3.8 million in 2008. One of only two Export Cabriolets was sold above its estimate on auction by Gooding & Company for US$1.87 million in 2011. Bonhams auctioned a Touring Berlinetta s/n 0088E, for US$3.19 million in 2014. The penultimate Export, a Touring Barchetta s/n 0158ED, was sold by RM Sotheby's for €6.72 million in 2015.

== Gallery ==
Ferrari 212 Export Vignale Coupé s/n 0092E

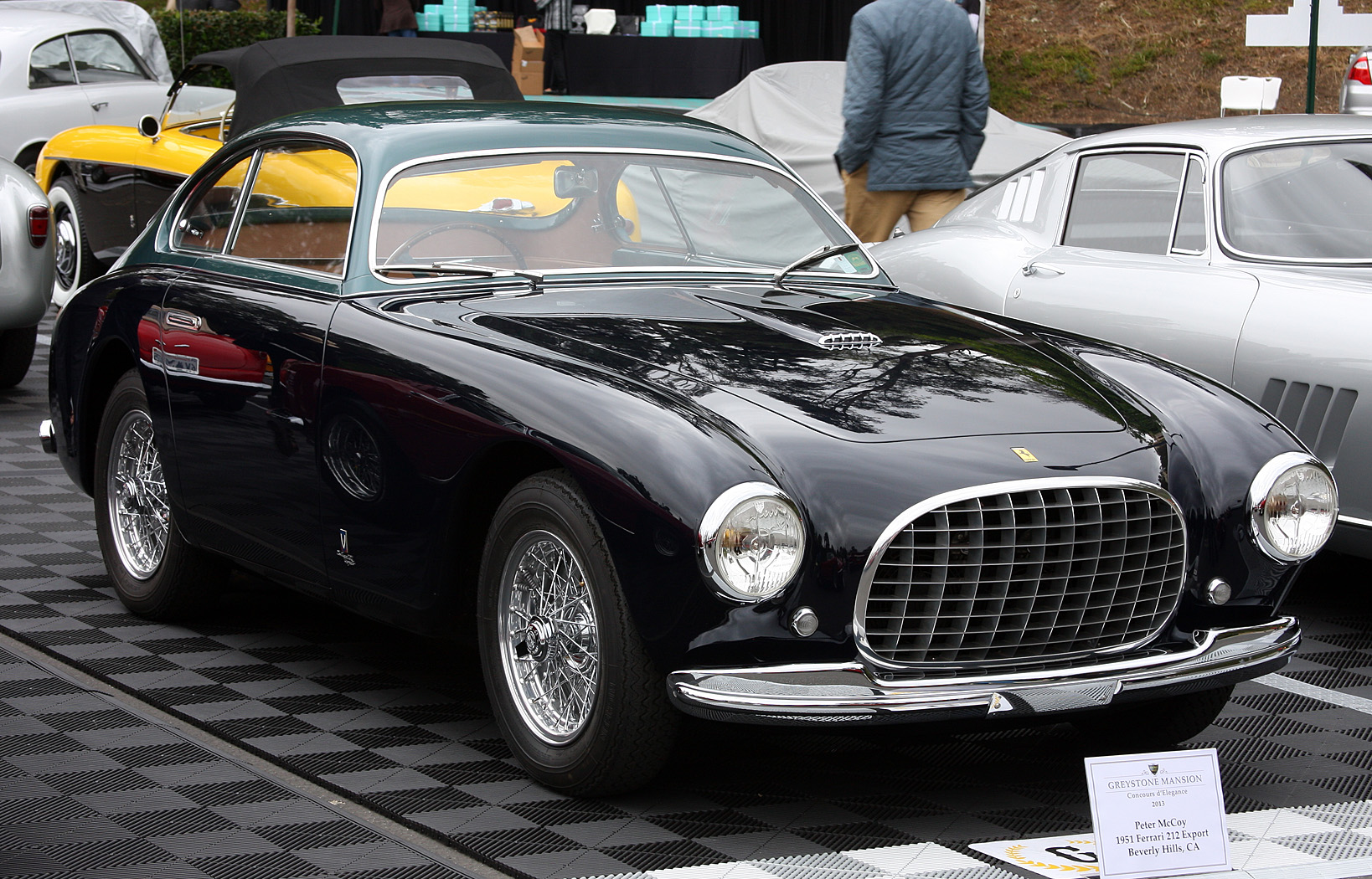

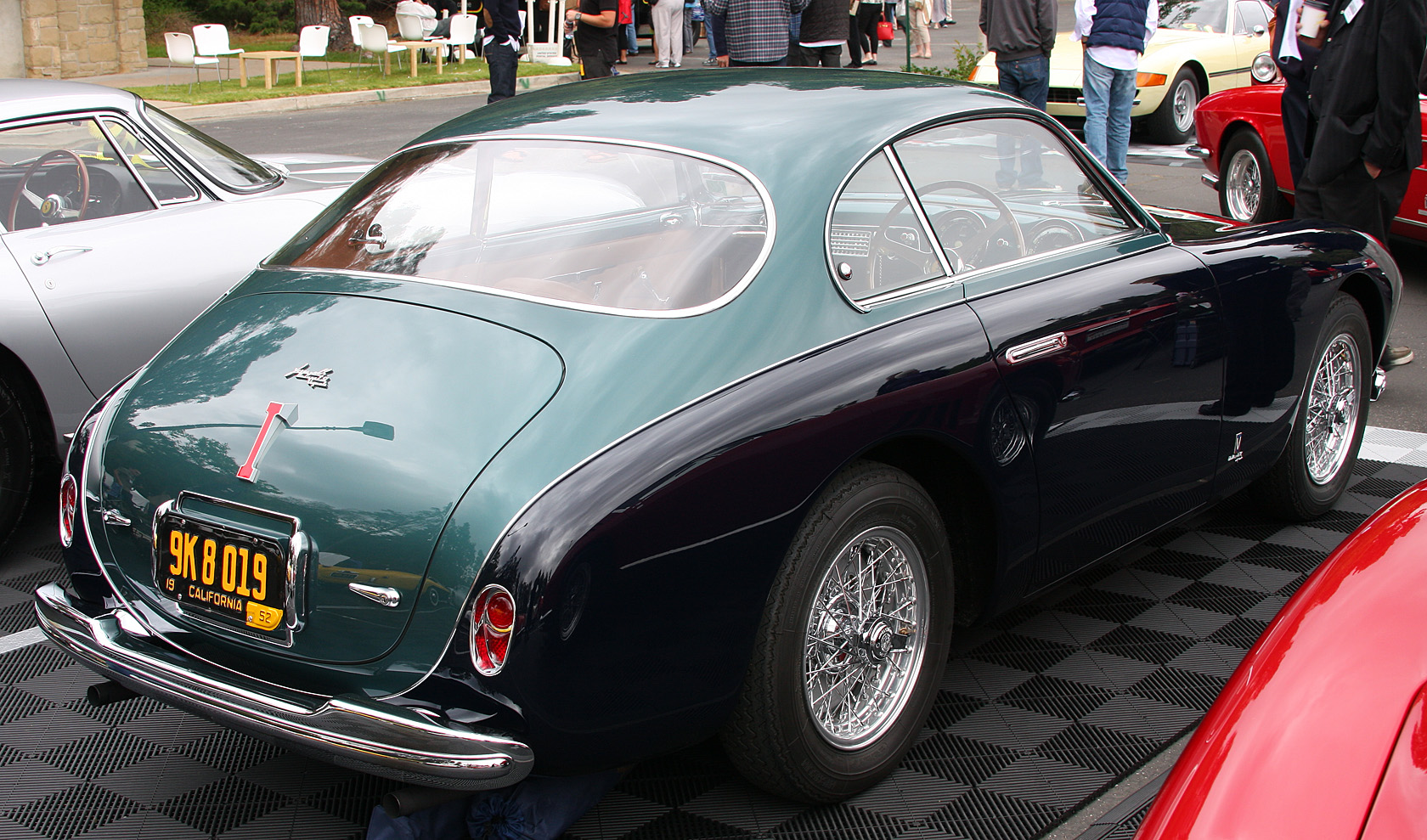

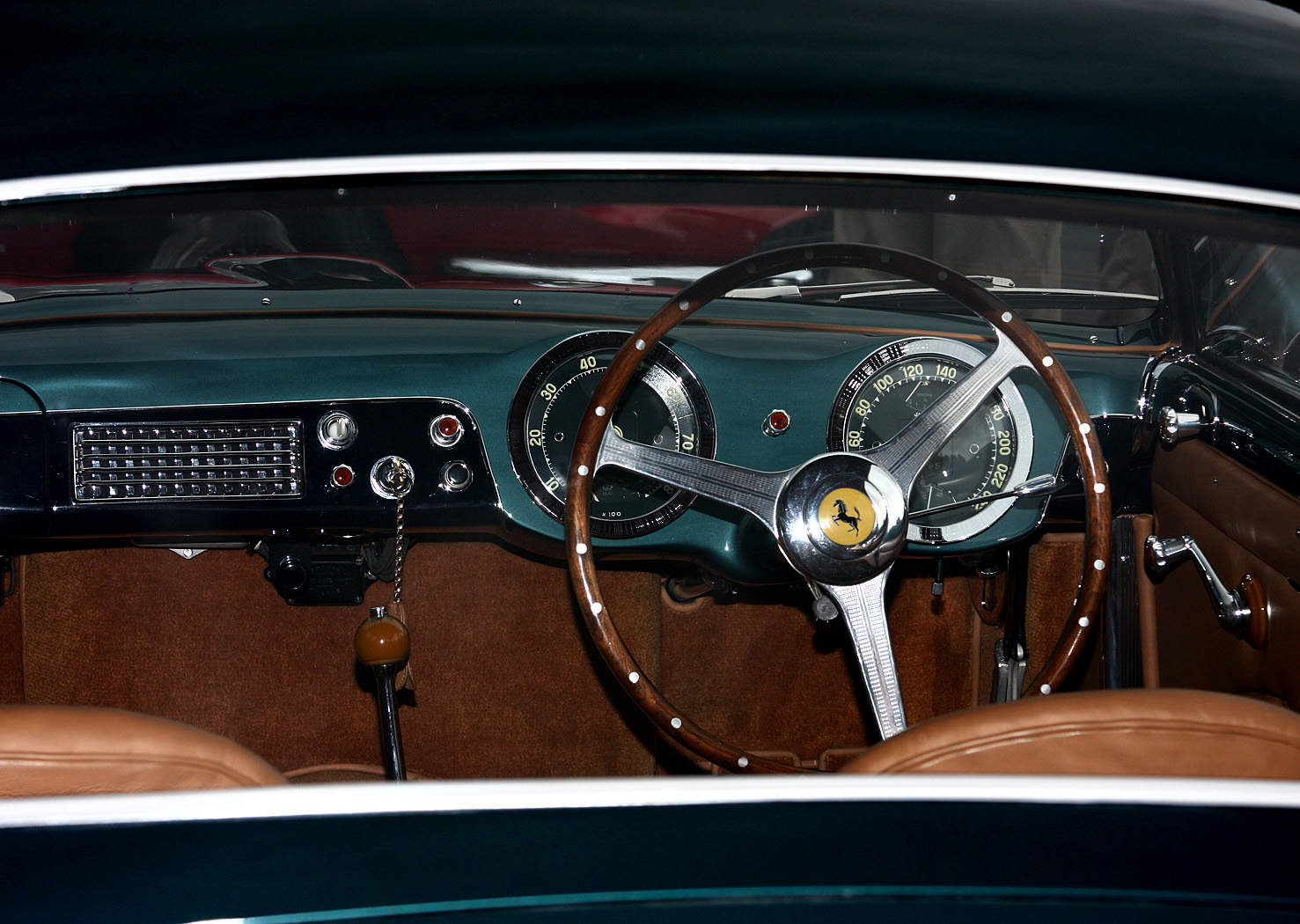

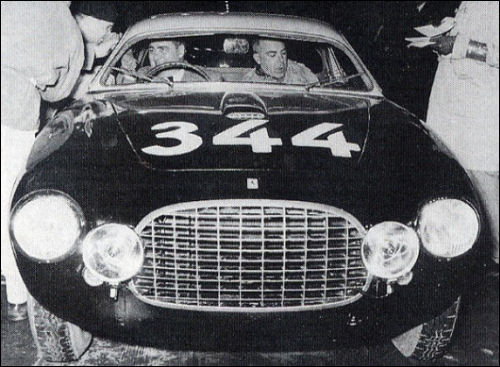
Ferrari 212 Export s/n 0098E, rebodied as barchetta

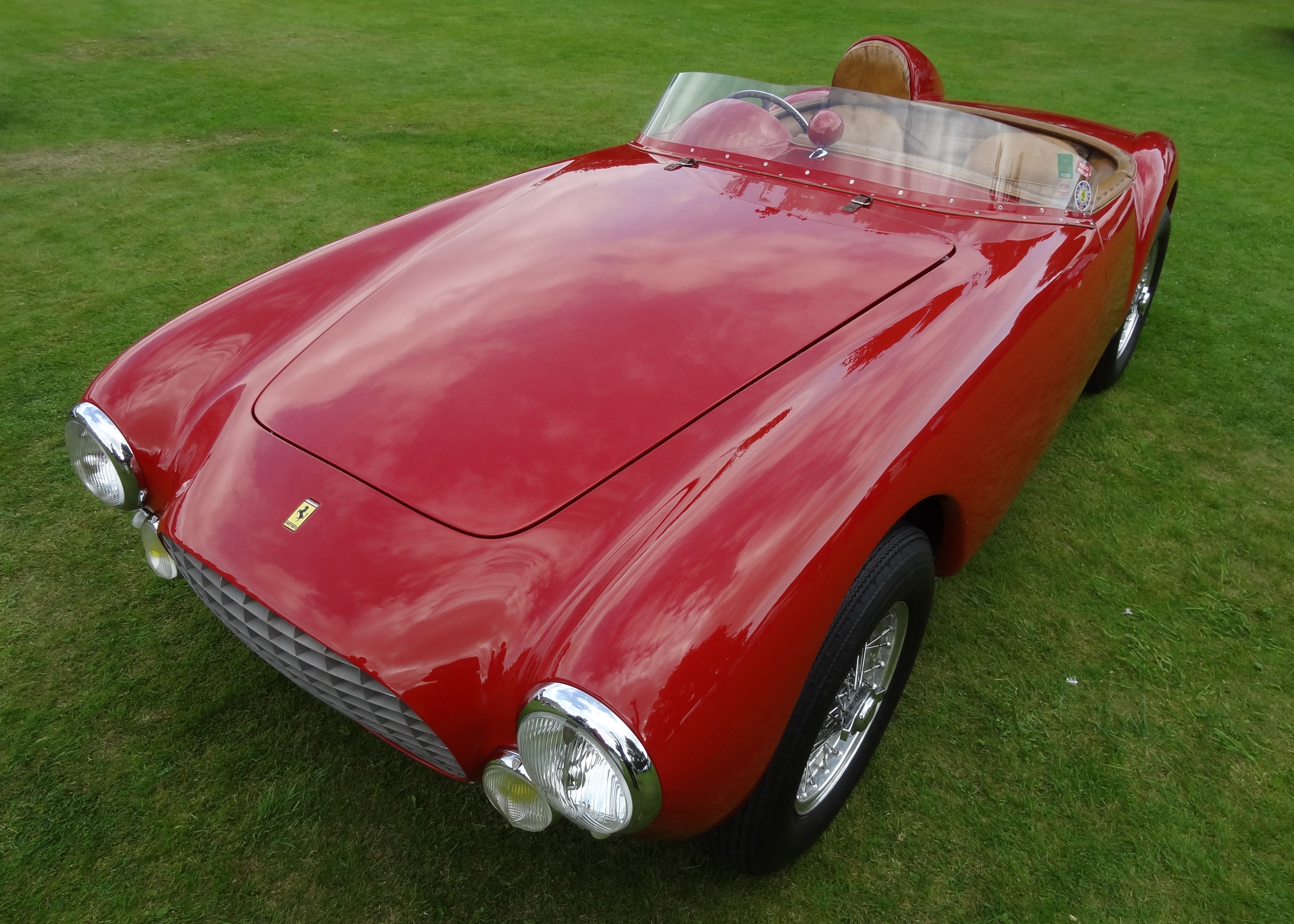

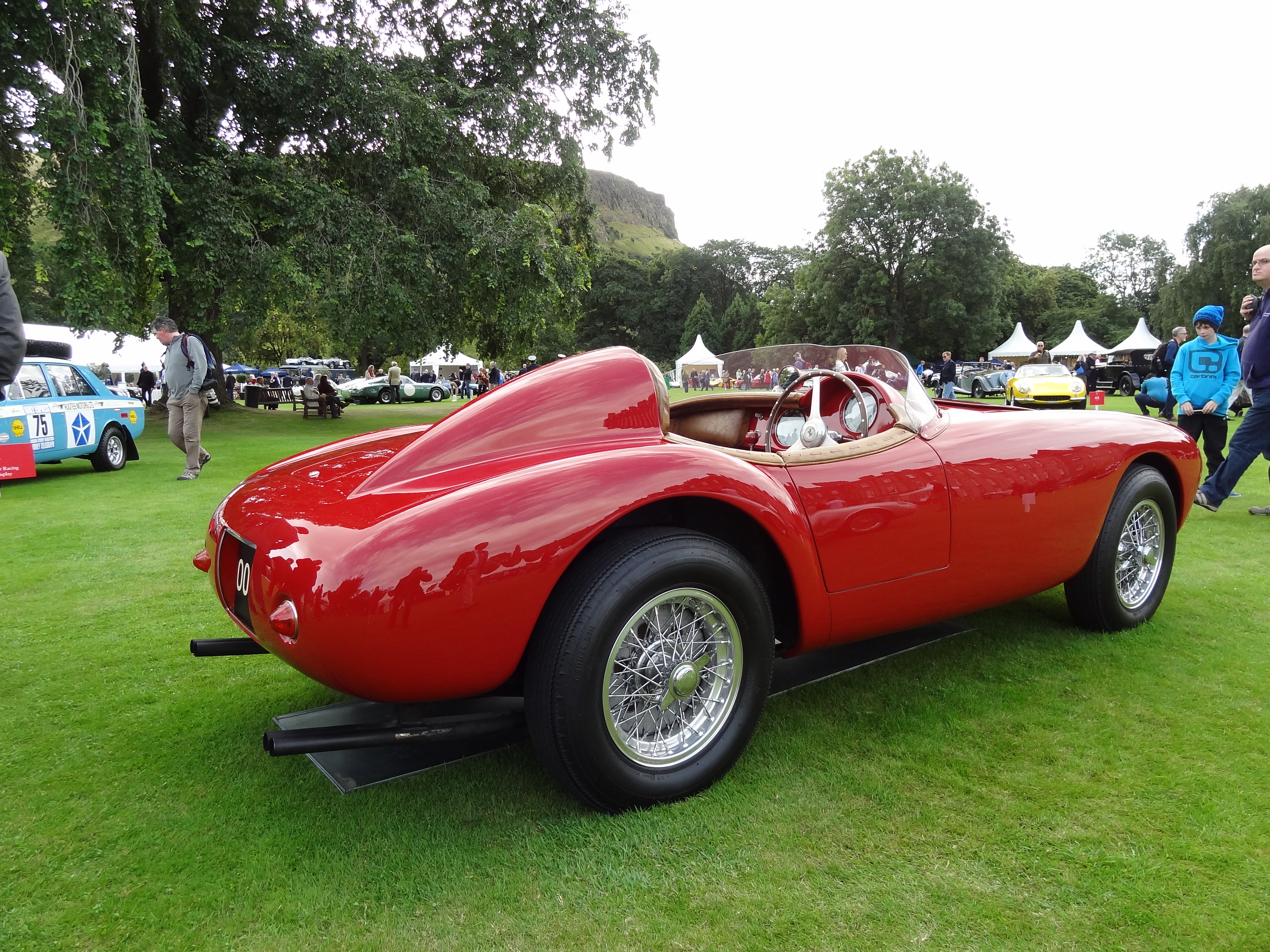

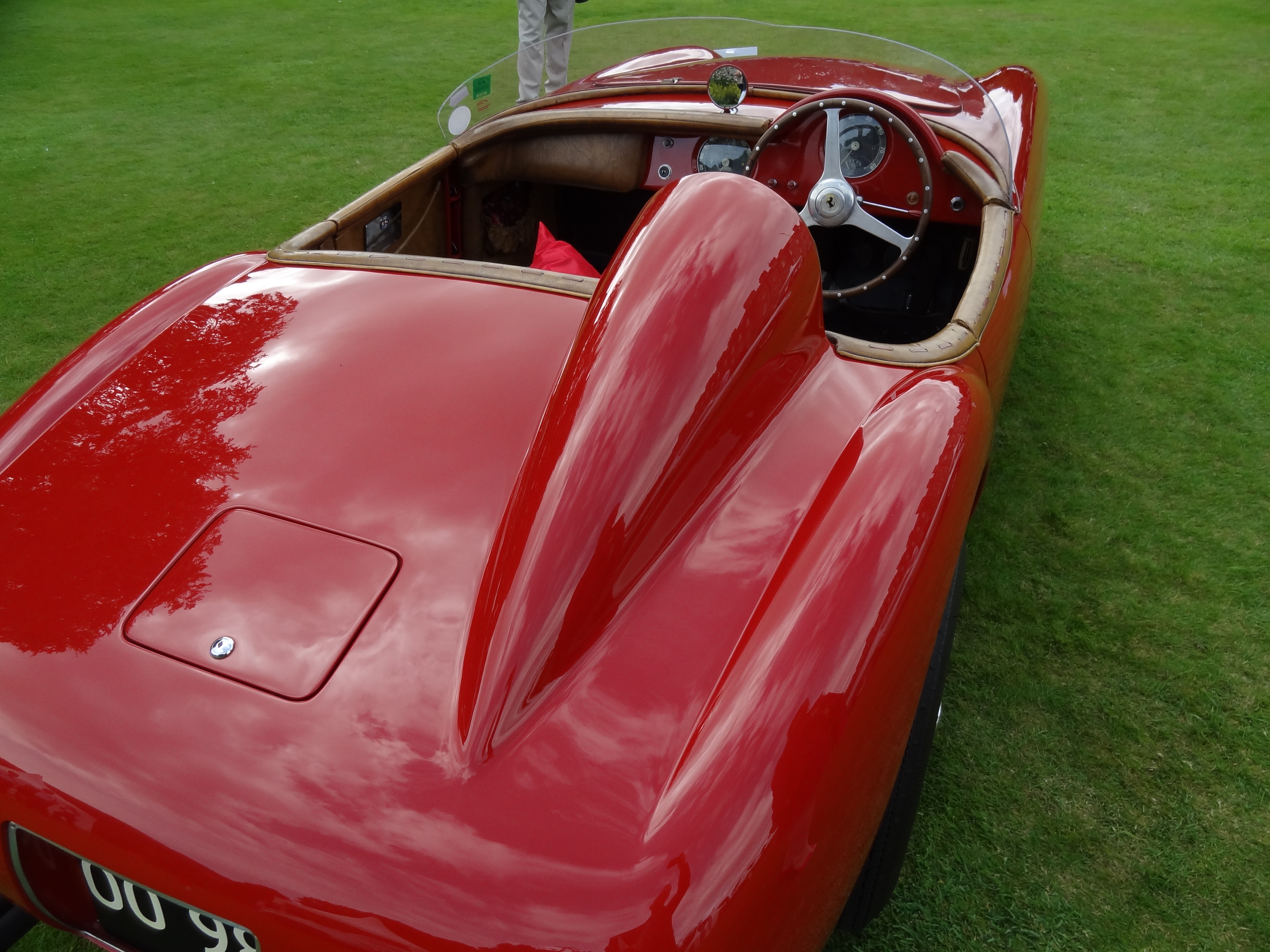

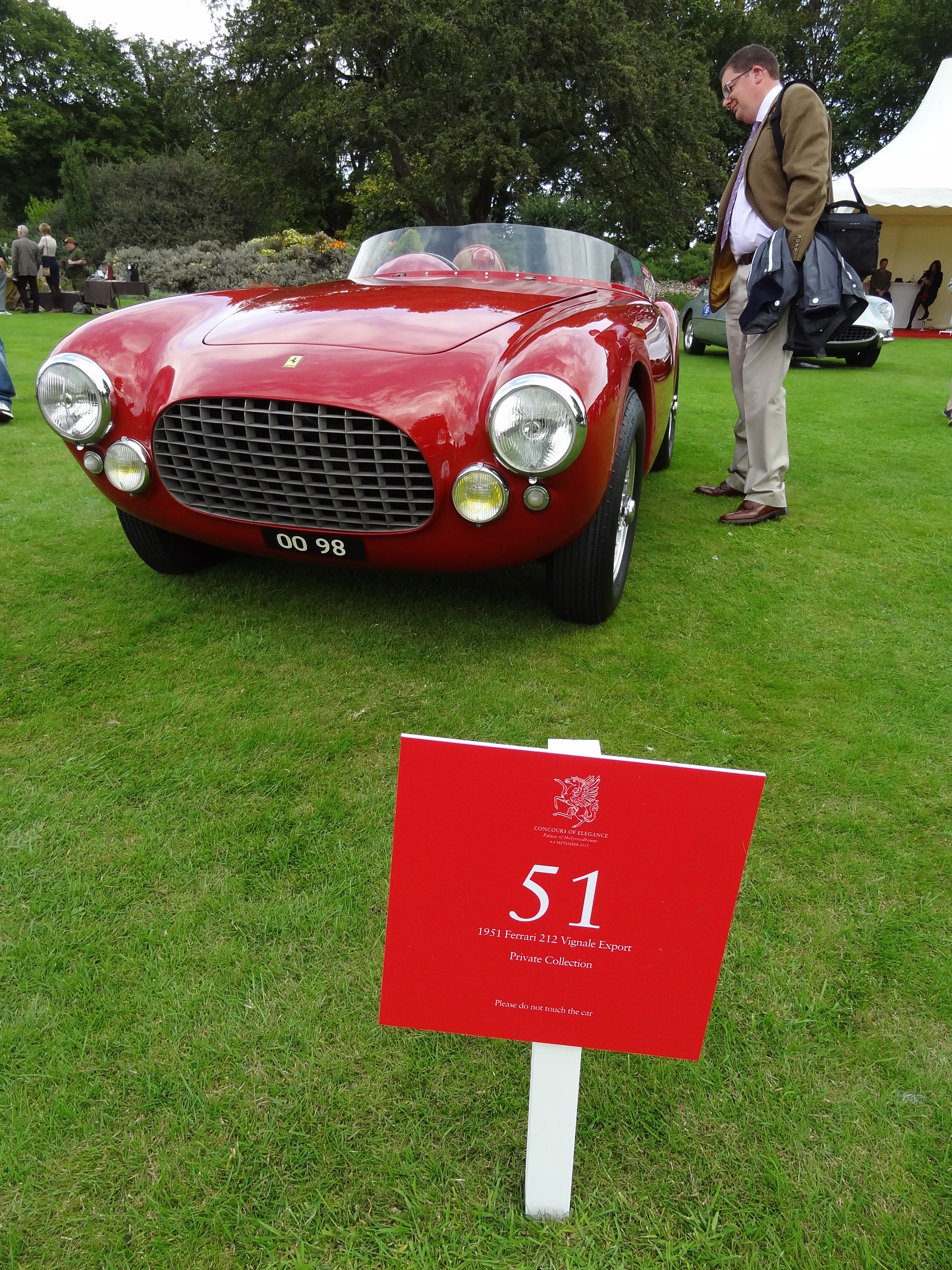
