= Grand tourer =

High-performance luxury car

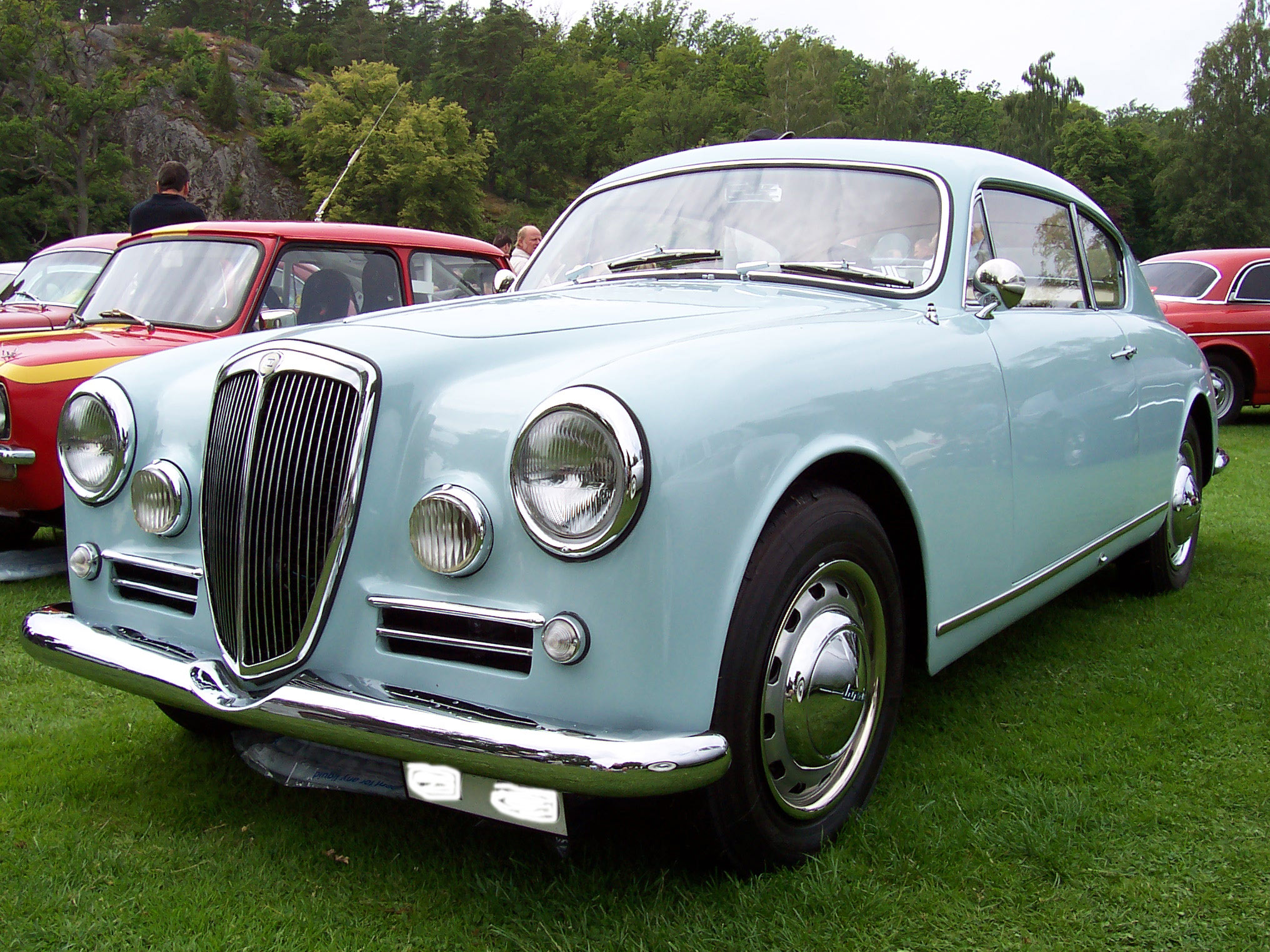
1951 Lancia Aurelia B20 GT

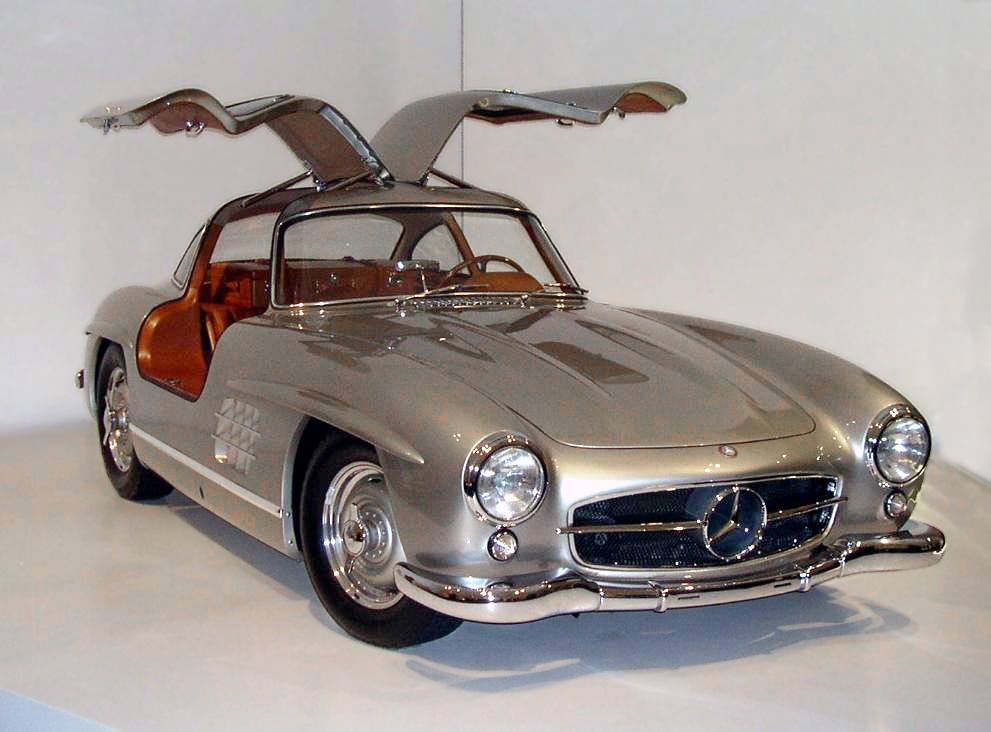
1955 Mercedes-Benz 300SL Gullwing

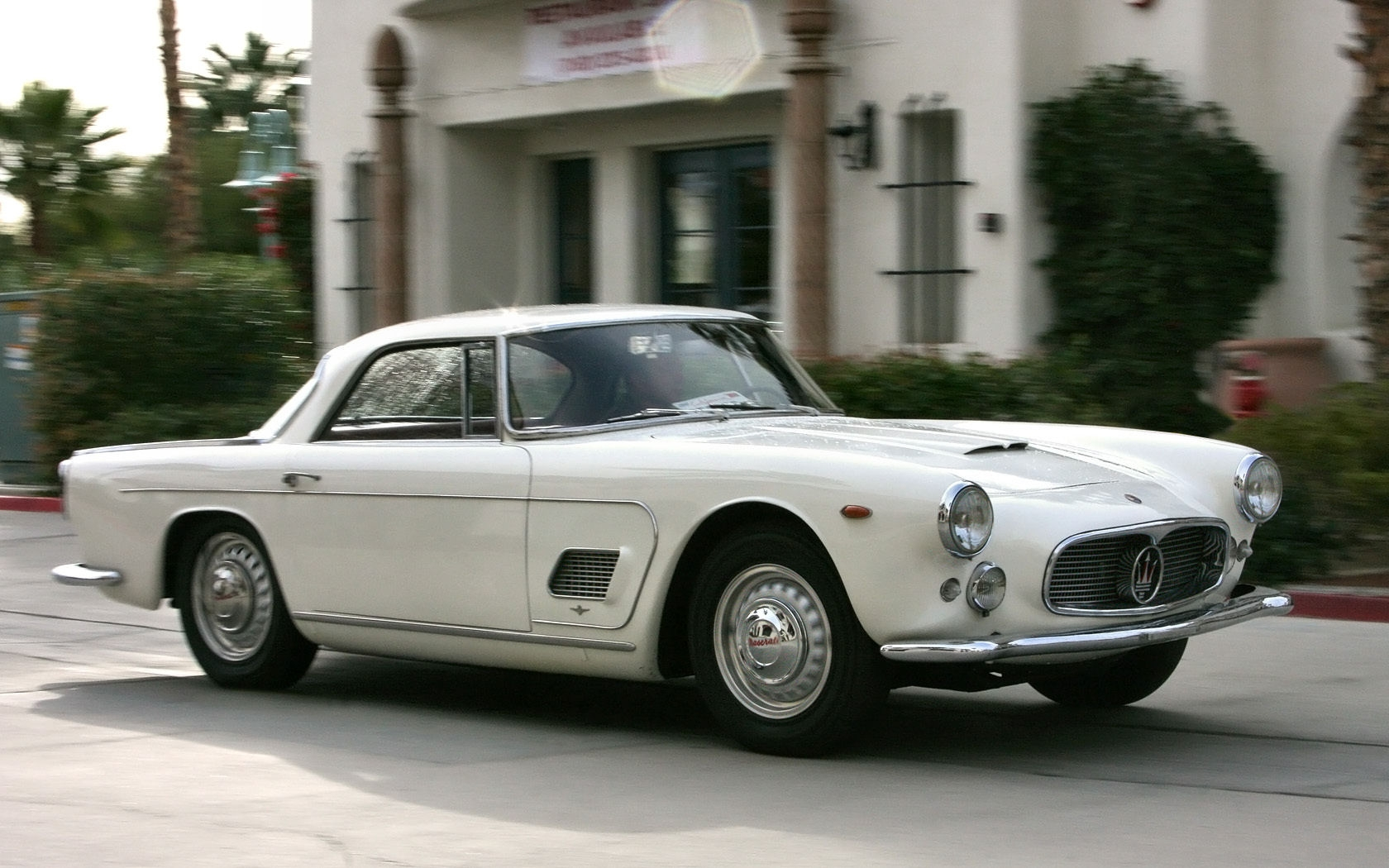
1960 Maserati 3500 GT

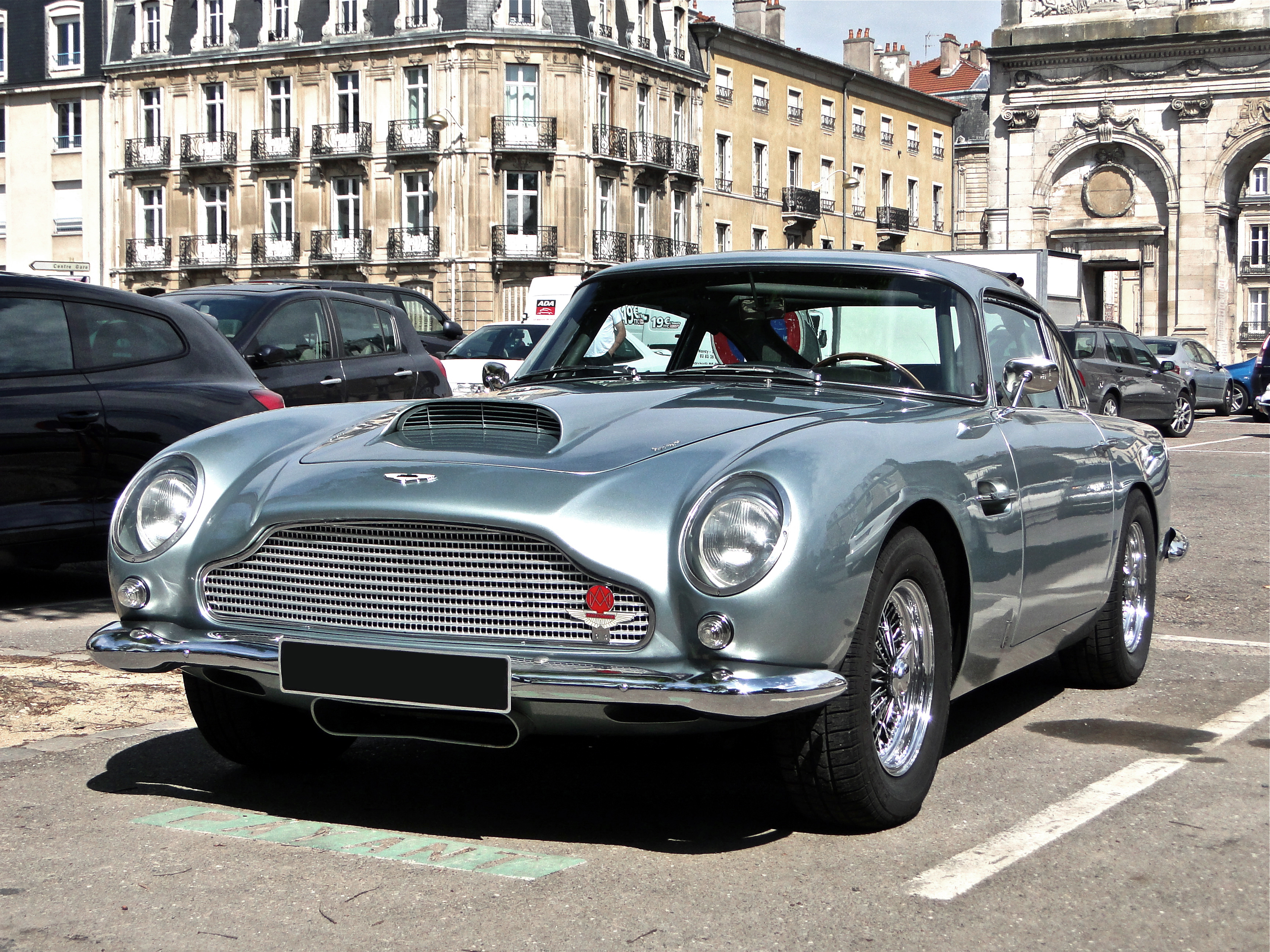
1963 Aston Martin DB5

A grand tourer (GT) is a type of car that is designed for high speed, long-distance driving with luxury specifications. The most common format is a front-engine, rear-wheel-drive two-door coupé with either a two-seat or a 2+2 arrangement. Grand tourers are often the coupé derivative of luxury saloons or sedans. Some models, such as the Ferrari 250 GT, Jaguar E-Type, and Aston Martin DB5, are considered classic examples of grand tourers.

The term is a near-calque from the Italian language phrase gran turismo, which became popular in the English language in the 1950s, evolving from fast touring cars and streamlined closed sports cars during the 1930s.

== Origin in Europe ==
The grand touring car concept originated in Europe in the early 1950s, especially with the 1951 introduction of the Lancia Aurelia B20 GT, and features notable luminaries of Italian automotive history such as Vittorio Jano, Enzo Ferrari and Johnny Lurani. Motorsports became important in the evolution of the grand touring concept, and grand touring entries are important in endurance sports-car racing. The grand touring definition implies material differences in performance, speed, comfort, and amenities between elite cars and those of ordinary motorists.

In the post-war United States, manufacturers were less inclined to adopt the "ethos of the GT car", preferring to build cars "suited to their long, straight, smooth roads and labor-saving lifestyles" with wide availability of powerful straight-six and V8 engines in all price ranges like the 1955–1965 Chrysler 300. Despite this, the United States, enjoying early post-war economic expansion, became the largest market for European grand-touring cars, supplying transportation for movie stars, celebrities and the jet set; notably the Mercedes-Benz 300 SL (imported by Max Hoffman), the Jaguar XK120, and the Ferrari berlinettas (imported by Luigi Chinetti). Classic grand-touring cars from the post-war era especially, have since become valuable cars among wealthy collectors. Within ten years, grand touring cars found success penetrating the new American personal luxury car market.

== Characteristics ==
The terms grand tourer, gran turismo, grande routière, and GT are among the most misused terms in motoring. The grand touring designation generally "means motoring at speed, in style, safety, and comfort". "Purists define gran turismo as the enjoyment, excitement and comfort of open-road touring."

According to Sam Dawson, news editor of Classic Cars, "the ideal is of a car with the ability to cross a continent at speed and in comfort yet provide driving thrills when demanded" and it should exhibit the following:

- The engines "should be able to cope with cruising comfortably at the upper limits on all continental roads without drawbacks or loss of usable power".
- "Ideally, the GT car should have been devised by its progenitors as a Grand Tourer, with all associated considerations in mind."
- "It should be able to transport at least two comfortably with their luggage and have room to spare — probably in the form of a two plus two seating arrangement."
- The design, both "inside and out, should be geared toward complete control by the driver".
- Its "chassis and suspension provide suitable handling and roadholding on all routes" during travels.

Grand tourers emphasise comfort and handling over straight-out high performance or ascetic, spartan accommodations. In comparison, sports cars (also a "much abused and confused term") are typically more "crude" compared to "sophisticated Grand Touring machinery". However, the popularity of using GT for marketing purposes has meant that it has become a "much misused term, eventually signifying no more than a slightly tuned version of a family car with trendy wheels and a go-faster stripe on the side".

Historically, most GTs have been front-engined with rear-wheel drive, offering more cabin space than mid-mounted engine layouts. Softer suspensions, greater storage, and more luxurious appointments add to their appeal.

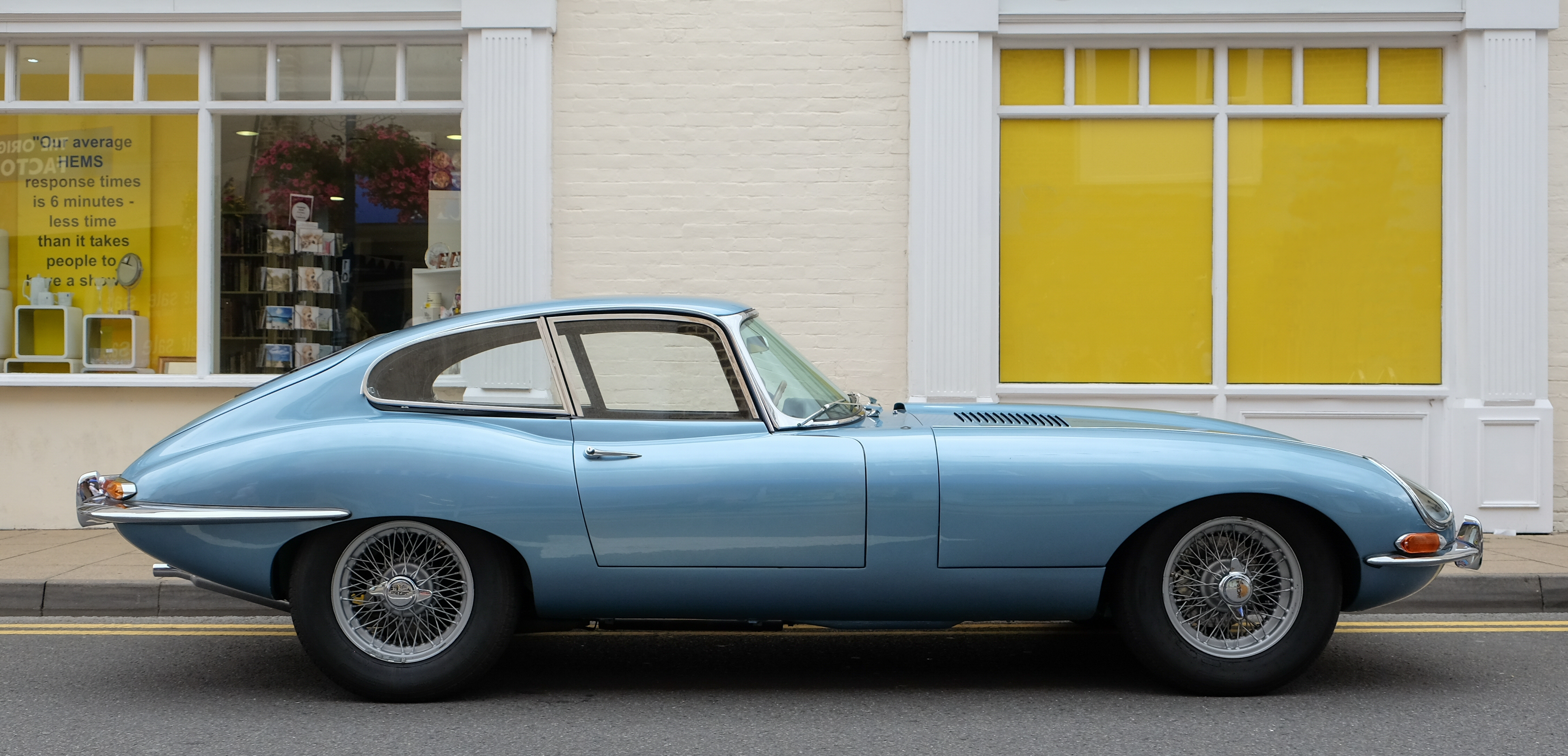
Front-engine, rear-wheel drive coupe: 1964 Jaguar E-Type. Automotive designers call the position of the driver's hip close to the rear axle "close-coupled".

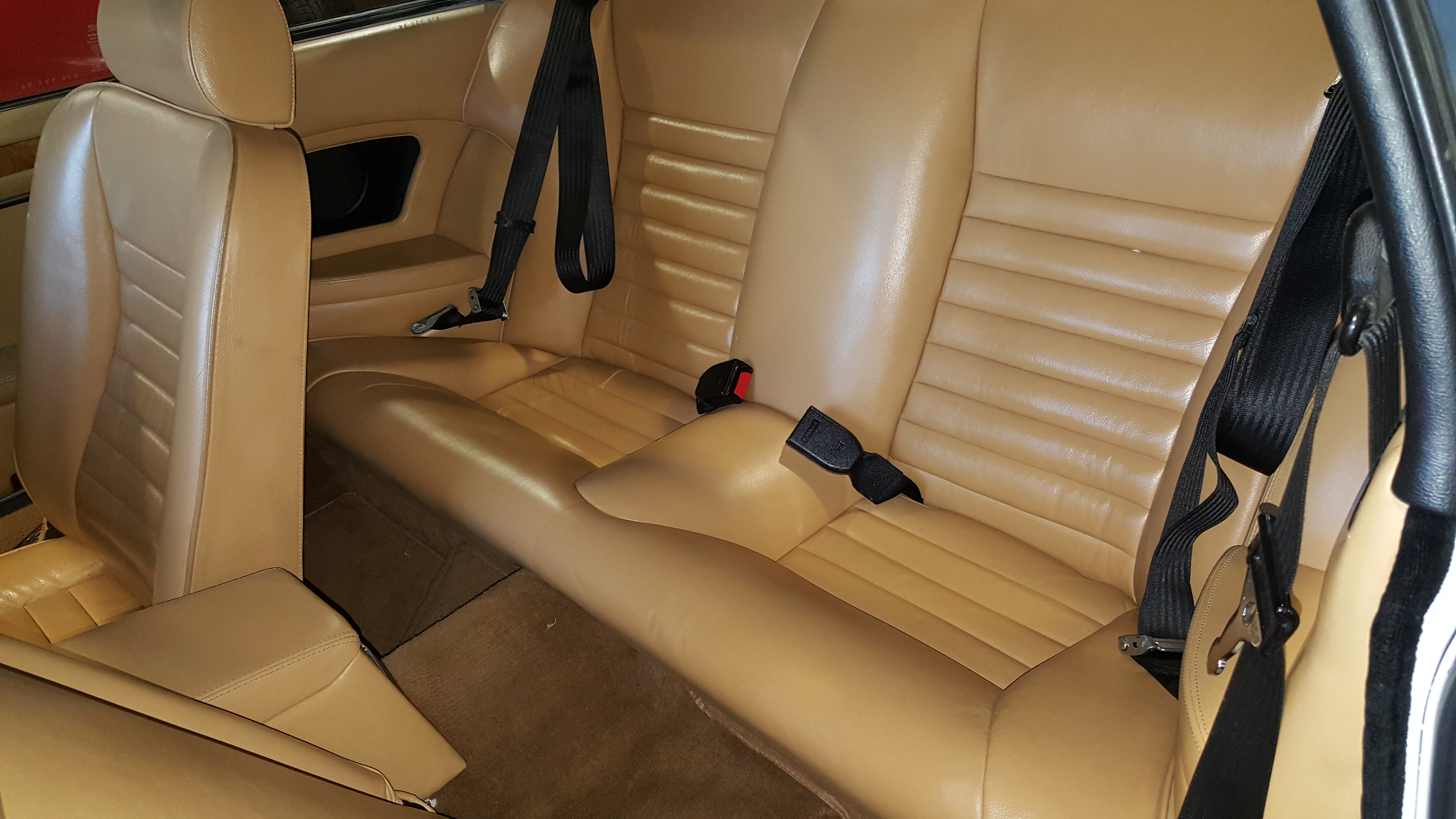
Rear seats of a 1982 Jaguar XJ-S HE coupe, showing the 2+2 seating layout

== GT abbreviation in marketing ==
The GT abbreviation—and variations thereof—are often used as model names. However, some cars with GT in the model name are not actually grand touring cars.

Among the many variations of GT are:

- GTA: Gran turismo alleggerita - the Italian word for 'lightweight'. GTAm indicates a modified version. GTA is also sometimes used for automatic transmission models.
- GTB: Gran turismo berlinetta
- GTC: Various uses including gran turismo compressore for supercharged engines, gran turismo cabriolet, gran turismo compact, gran turismo crossover and gran turismo corsa - the Italian word for 'racing'.
- GTD: "Gran turismo diesel"
- GT/E: "Gran turismo Einspritzung" - the German word for 'fuel injection'
- GTE: "Grand touring estate"
- GTi or GTI: "Grand touring injection", mostly used for hot hatches following the introduction of the Volkswagen Golf GTi
- GTO: "Gran turismo omologato" - the Italian word for 'homologation'
- GTR or GT-R: "Gran turismo and racing"
- GTS: sometimes "Gran turismo spider" for convertible models. However, GTS has also been used for saloons and other body styles.
- GT-T: "Gran turismo turbo"
- GTV: "Gran turismo veloce" - the Italian word for 'fast'
- GTX: "Grand tourisme extreme"
- HGT: "High gran turismo"
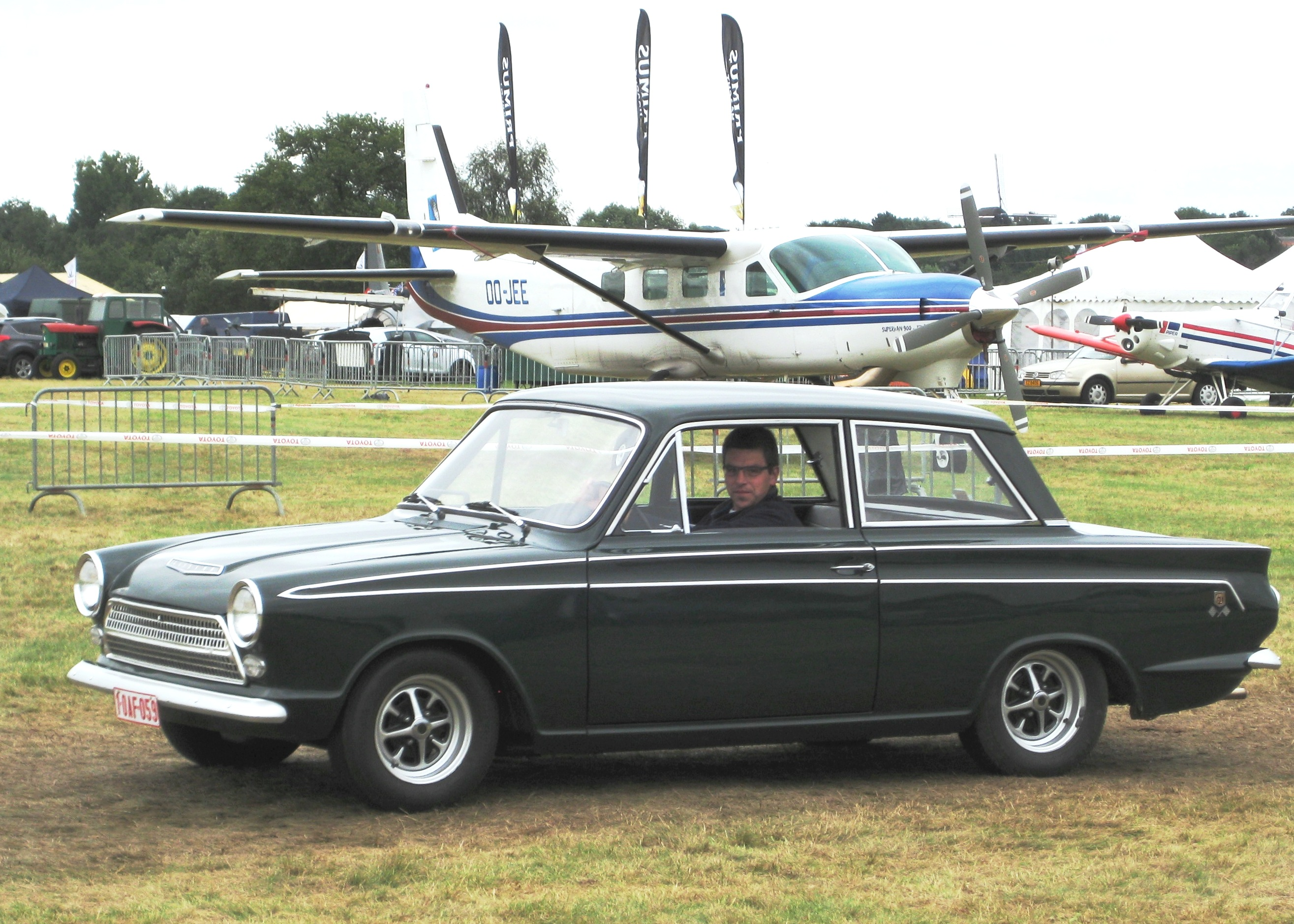
1962–1964 Ford Cortina GT: a sports saloon

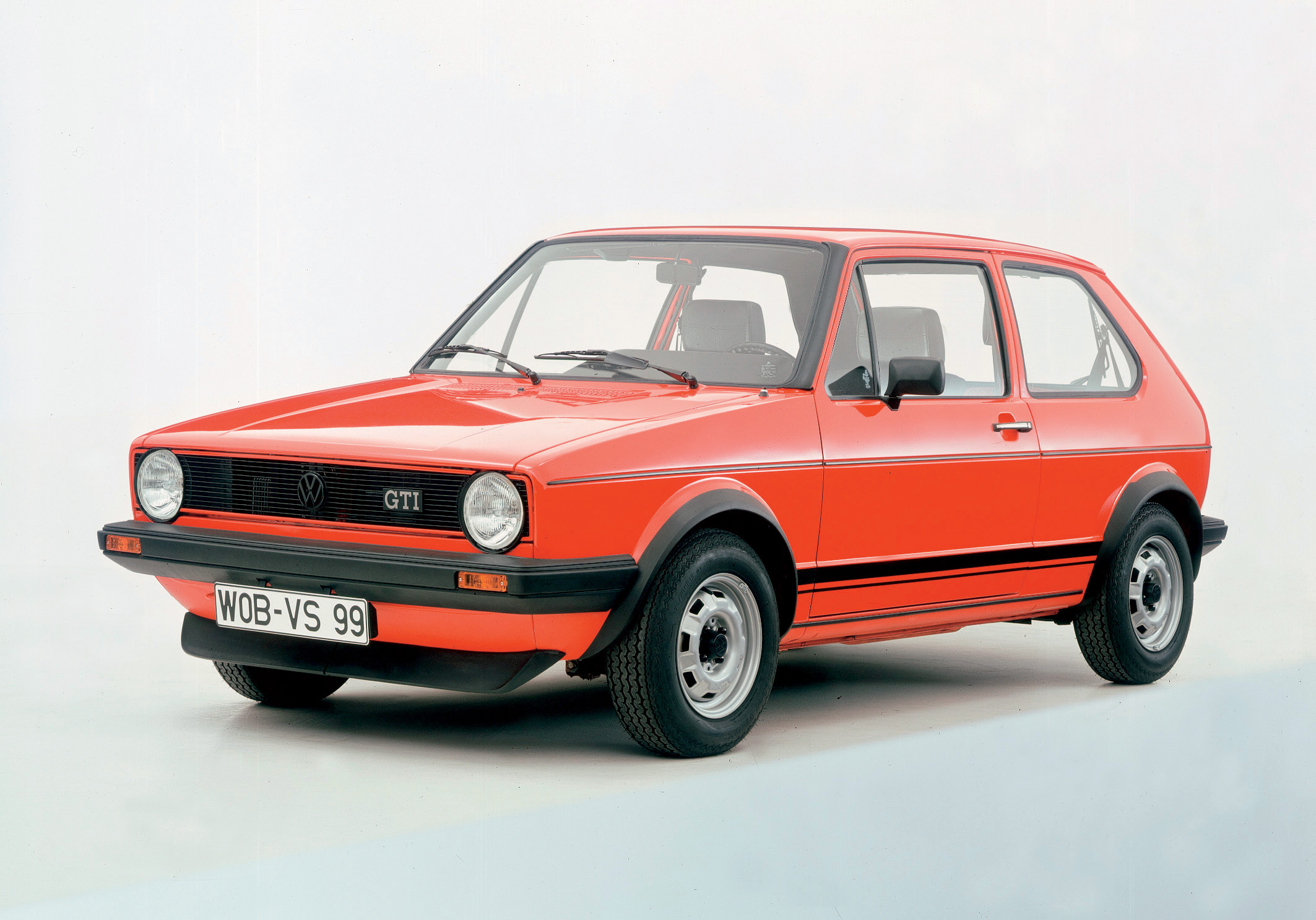
1982 Volkswagen Golf GTI: a hot hatch

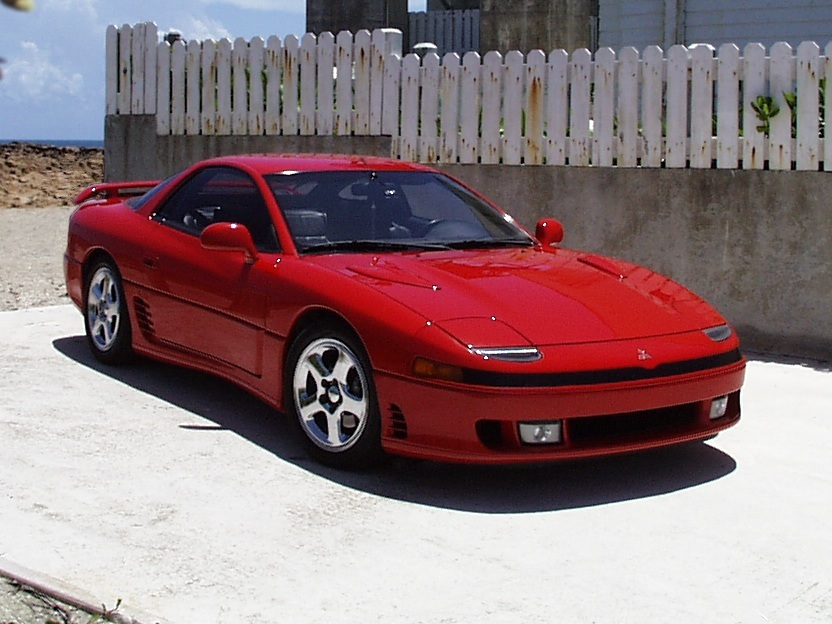
1990 Mitsubishi 3000GT GTO: a liftback coupé

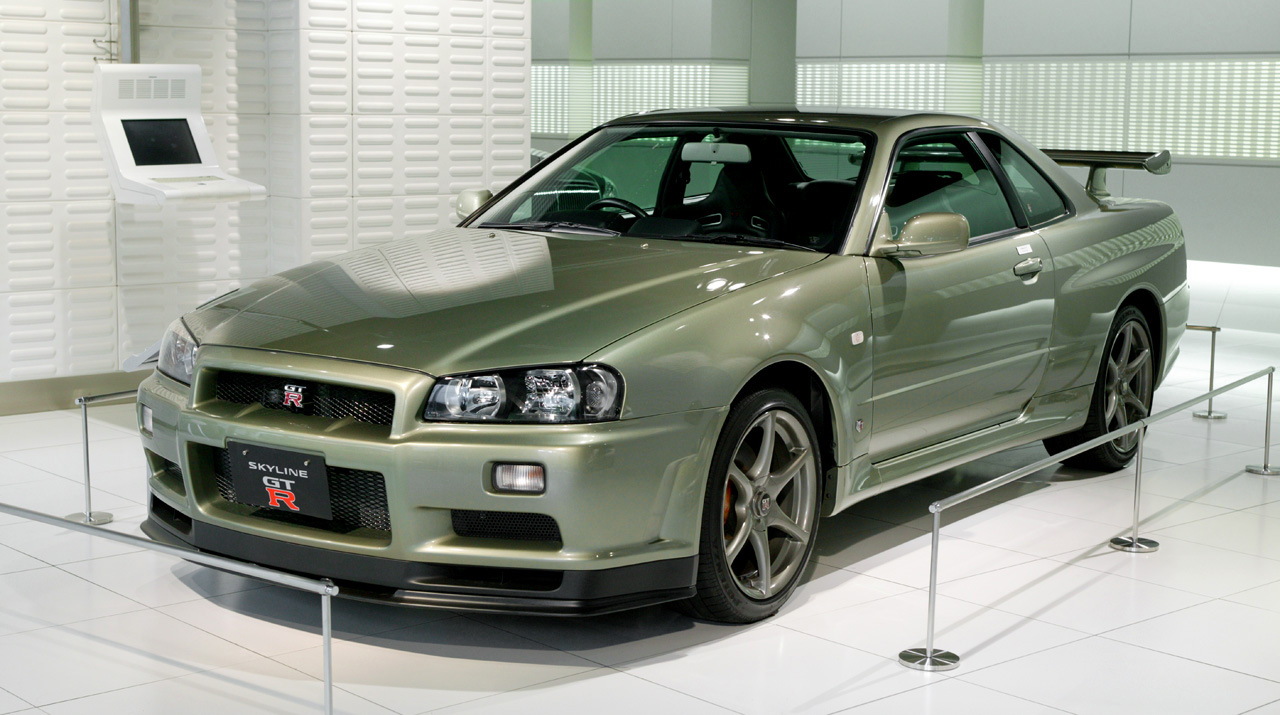
1999 Nissan Skyline GT-R: a coupé

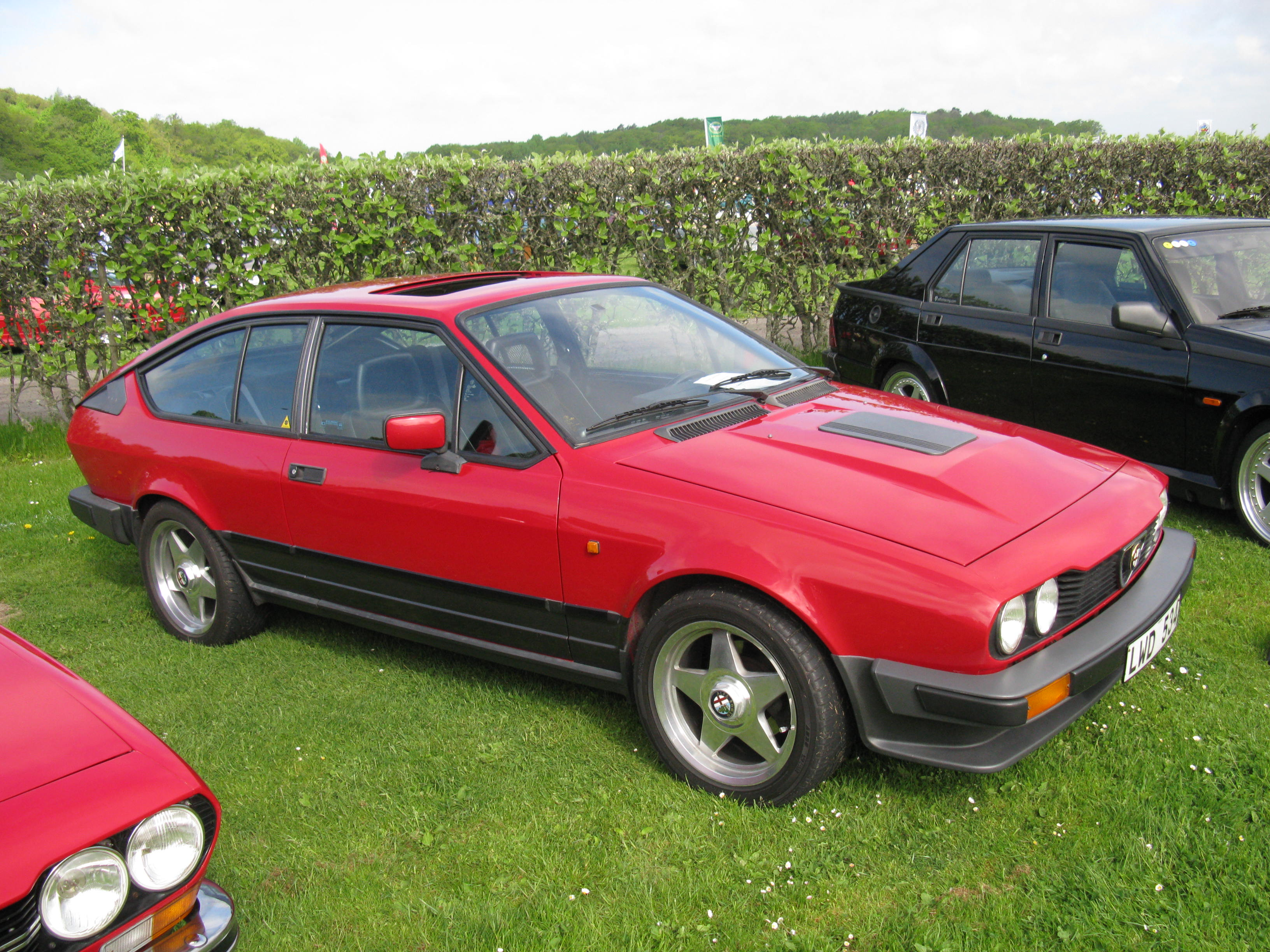
1980 Alfa Romeo Alfetta GTV6 2.5

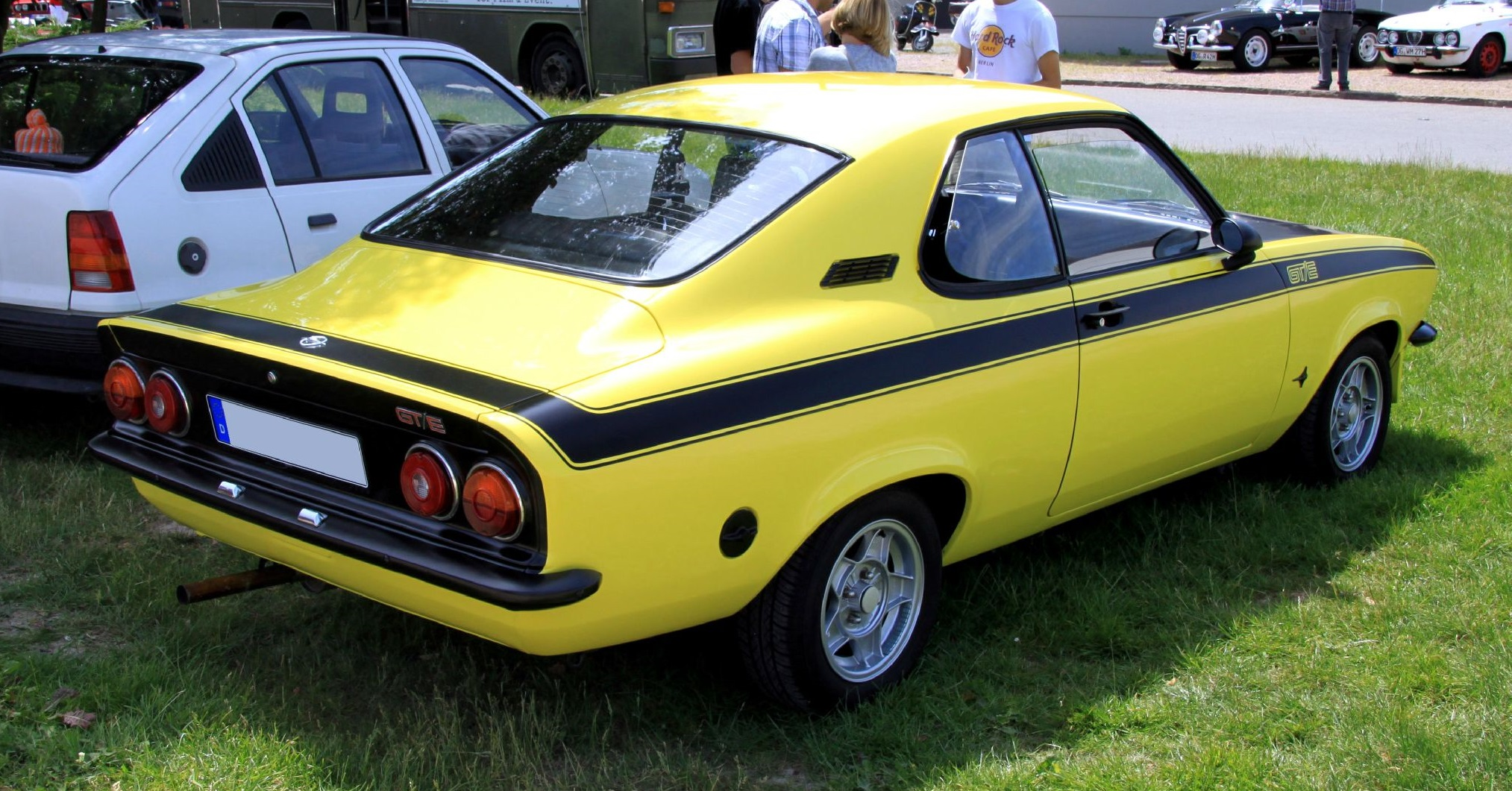
1975 Opel Manta GT/E: a five seater fastback

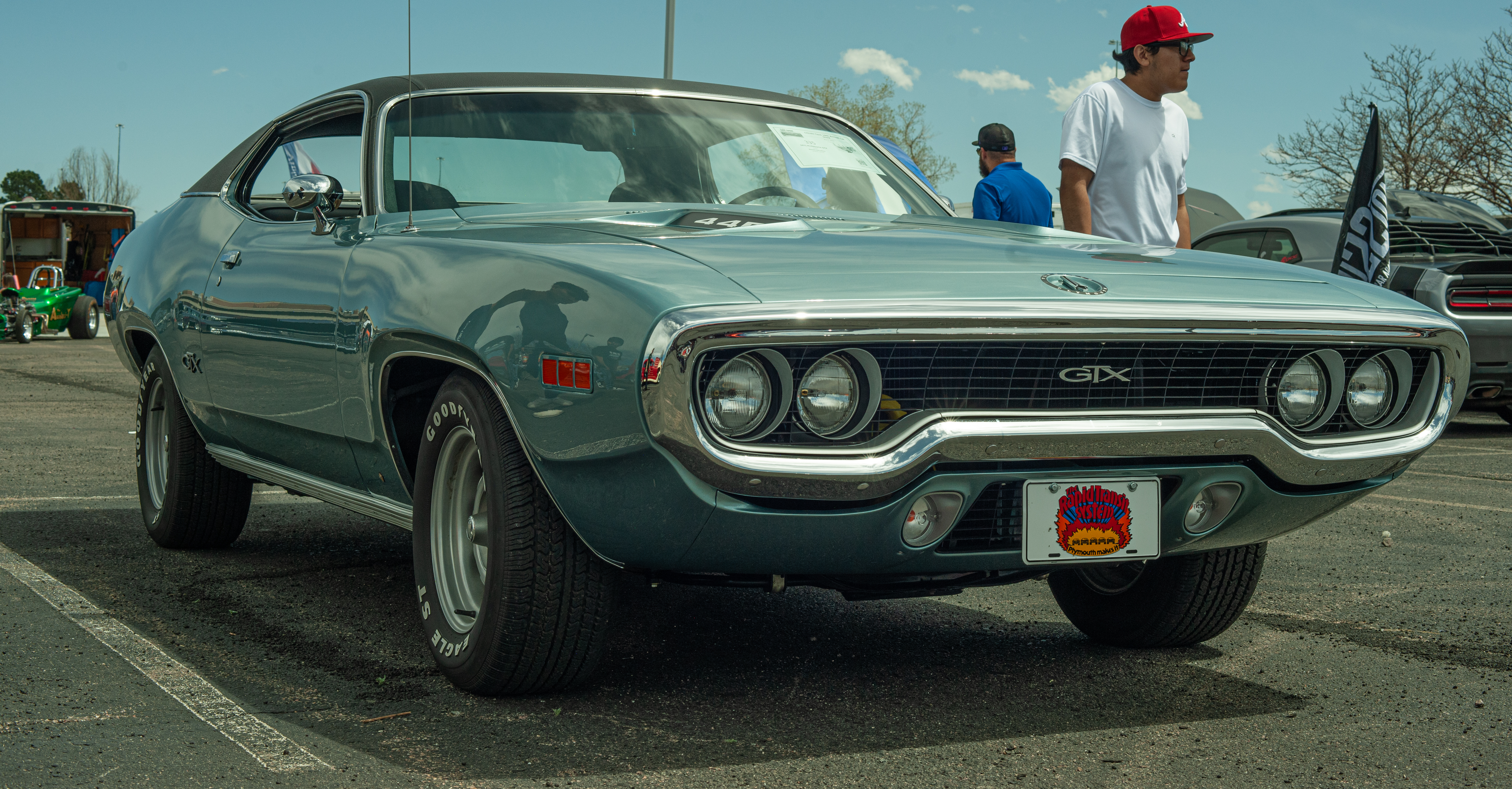
1971 Plymouth GTX, a muscle car

== World Championships and other GT racing series ==
=== Current World Championship ===
- FIA World Endurance Championship – In operation since 2012, the current auto racing World Championship for both Sports prototypes and Group GT3 cars organised by the Automobile Club de l'Ouest (ACO) and sanctioned by the Fédération Internationale de l'Automobile (FIA). The championship is considered a revival of the defunct World Sportscar Championship which ended in 1992. In 2012-2016 seasons the World Cup for GT Manufacturer was awarded to a winning manufacturer of GT cars, promoted to the World GT Manufacturers' Championship title since the 2017 season. This title awarded to a winning manufacturer of GT cars was discontinued after the 2022 season.

=== Former World Championships ===
- World Sportscar Championship – The first sports car racing world series run from 1953 to 1992. Originally contested only by Sports prototypes, the series expanded to GT cars in the 1954 season at the 1954 Mille Miglia, but from the 1985 season until its end it was again restricted to Sports prototypes only. In 1962-1984 seasons (except of the 1982 season) titles were awarded to manufacturers of GT cars alongside the manufacturers of Sports prototypes.
- FIA GT1 World Championship – A short-lived series for GT cars run from 2010 to 2012, created by Stéphane Ratel Organisation (SRO) in an attempt to promote the FIA GT Championship to World Championship status.

=== Other GT racing series ===
Several past and present motor racing series have used "GT" in their name. These include:

- GT World Challenge Europe 2014–present: A racing series for Group GT3 cars. The FIA GT Series replaced the FIA GT Championship (1997–2009) and the FIA GT1 World Championship (2010–2012).
- IMSA GT3 Cup Challenge 2005–present: A North American racing series for Porsche 911 GT3 Cup cars.
- GT4 European Series 2007–present: A European amateur racing series with the least powerful class of GT cars.
- SRO GT2 2018–present: Despite the name, this class slots between GT4 and GT3 in terms of performance. The cars have more power than GT3 cars, with the most powerful entries at nearly 700 horsepower. However, they have much less downforce than a GT3 car.
- LM GTE 1999–2023: A set of regulations for modified road cars, which is used for the 24 Hours of Le Mans race and several related racing series. LM GTE was originally called 'GT class' and was also known as GT2 class from 2005 to 2010. Also known as GTLM in the United States
- FIA GT3 European Championship 2006–2012: A European amateur racing series for Group GT3 cars.
- FIA R-GT: As part of its structure, the Group R regulations have a provision for GT cars, known as R-GT.

There have also been several classes of racing cars called GT. The Group GT3 regulations for modified road cars have been used for various racing series worldwide since 2006. The Group GT1 regulations were used for the fastest category of sports car racing from 1994 to 2001.

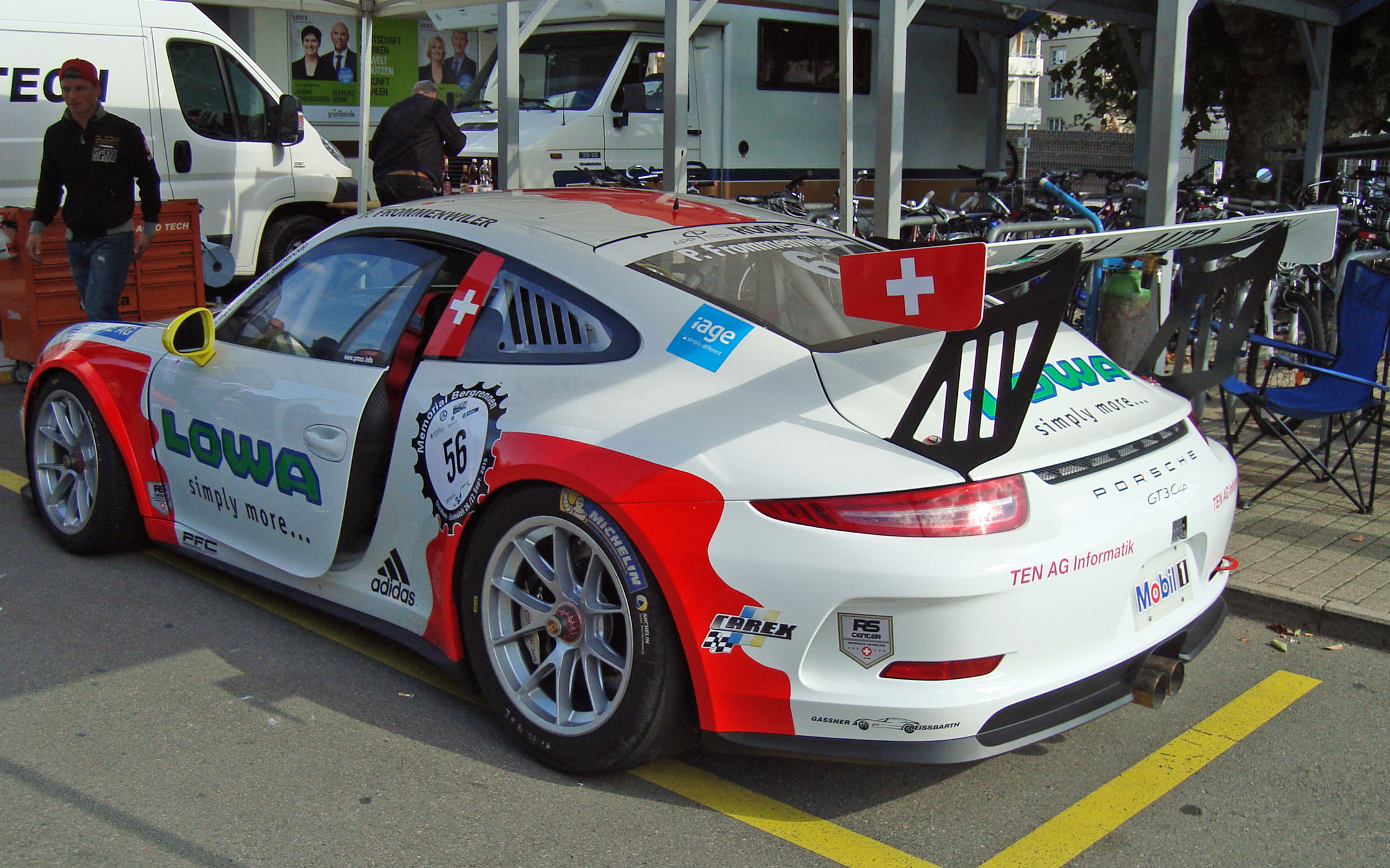
Porsche 911 GT3

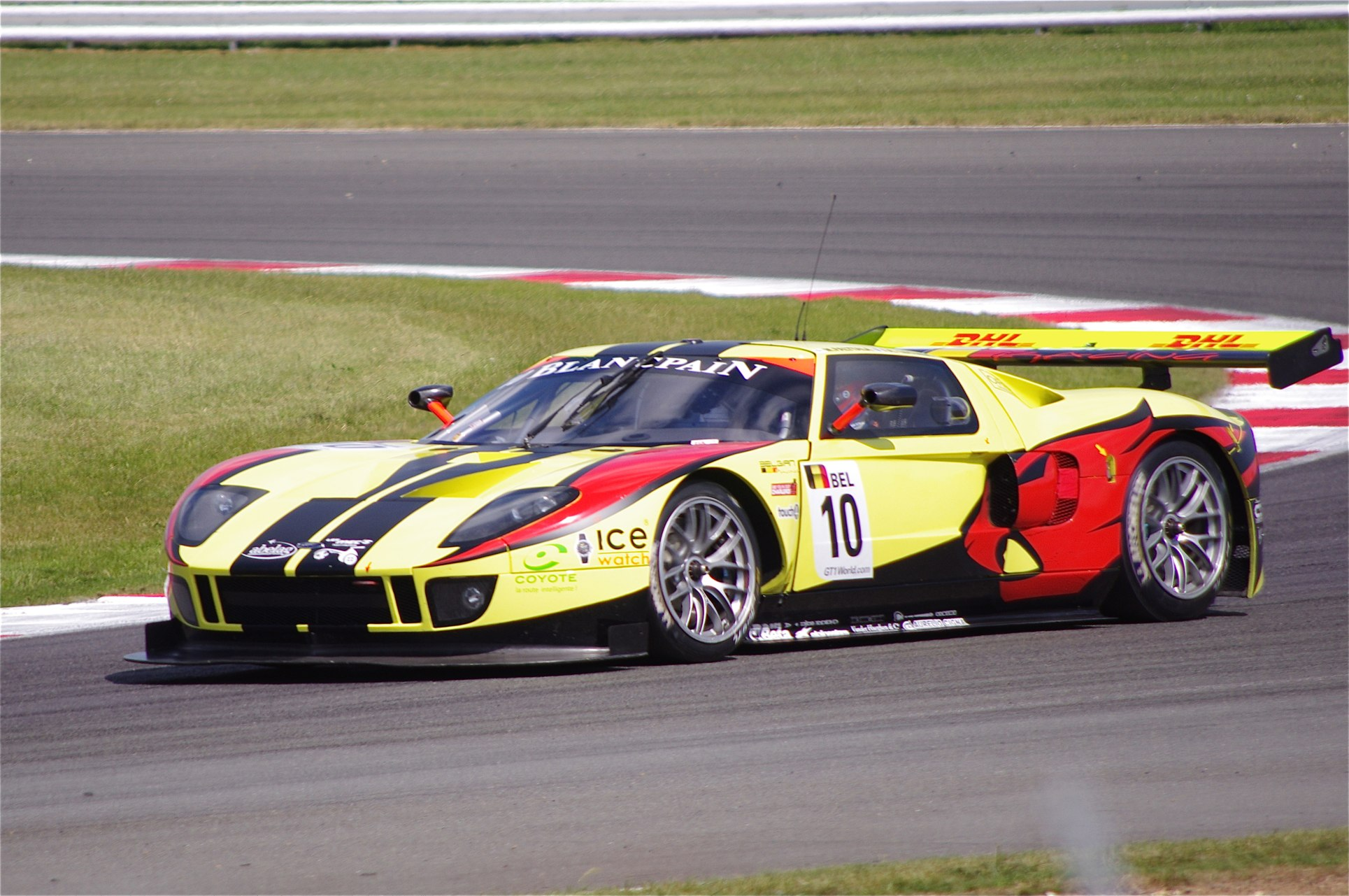
Ford GT1

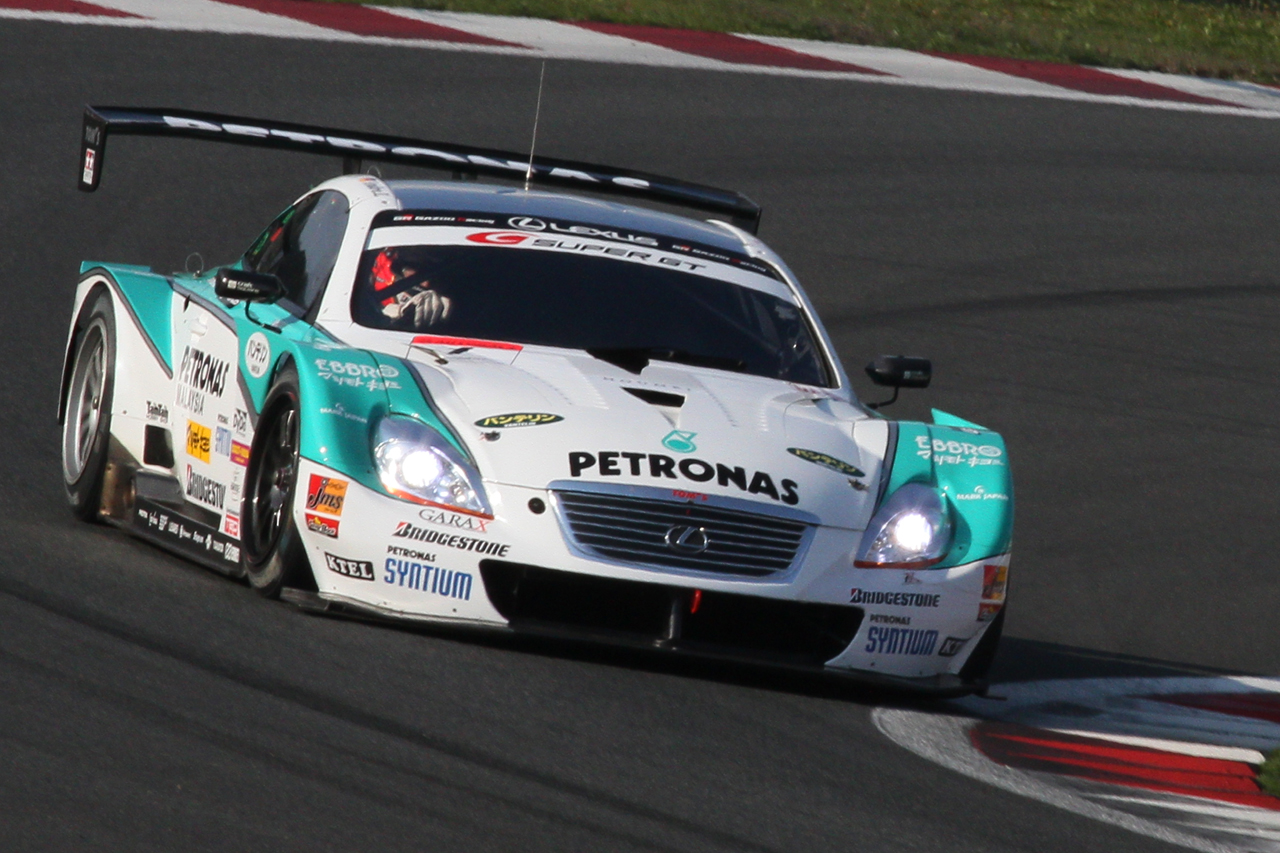
Lexus SC430 GT500

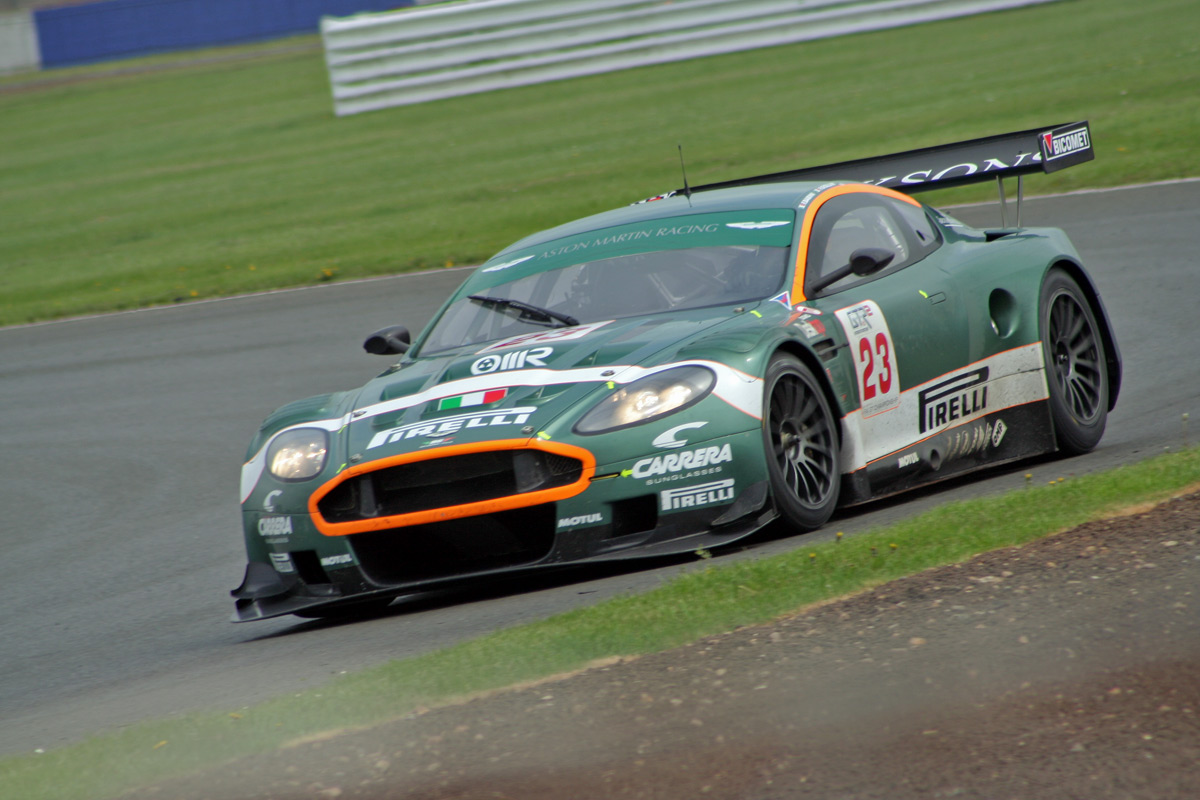
Aston Martin DBR9 GT1

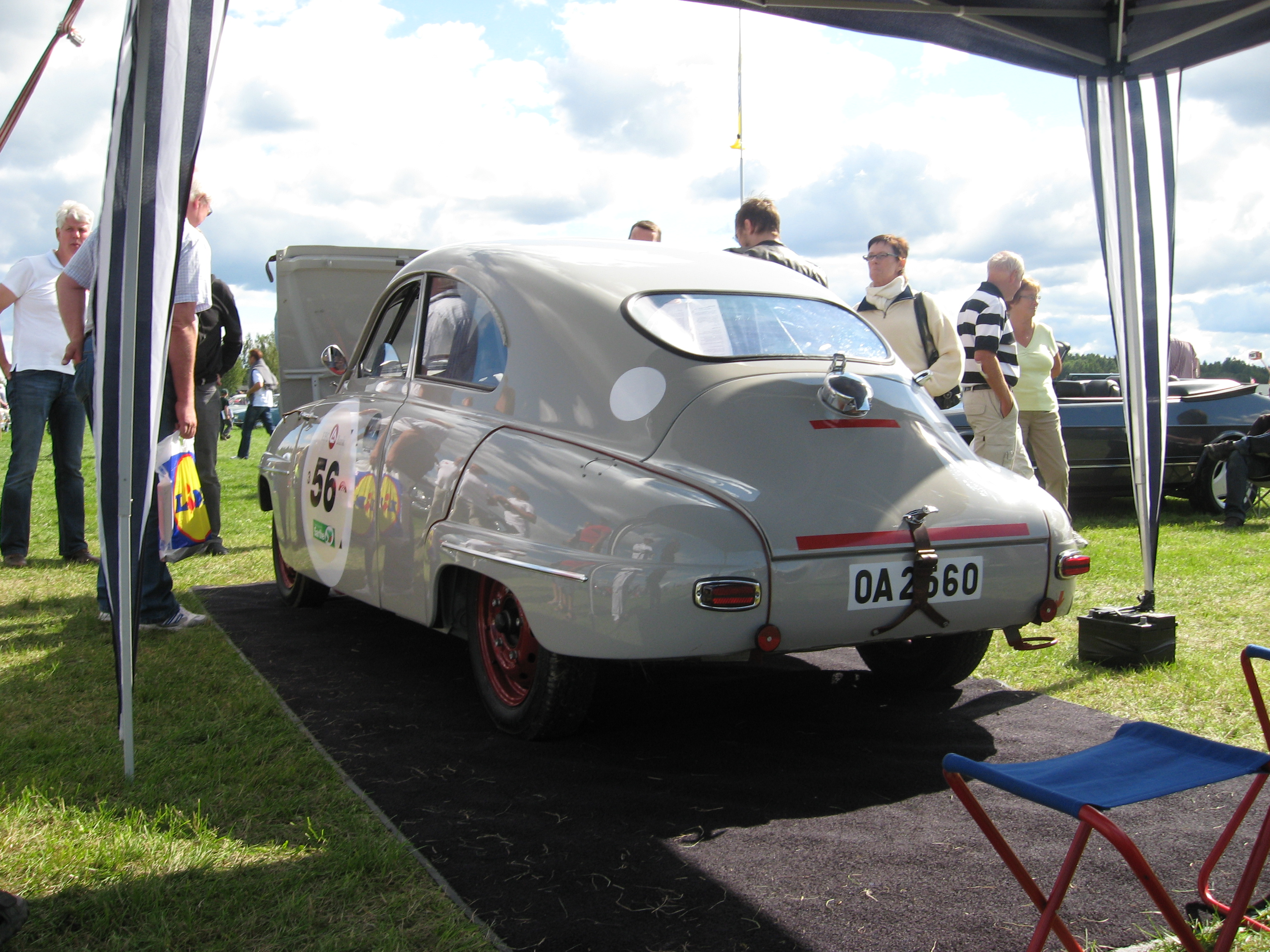
Saab 93 LeMans spec

== Examples of grand tourers ==
The inclusion of "grand tourer", "gran turismo", "GT" or similar in the model name does not necessarily mean that the car is a grand tourer since several manufacturers have used the terms for the marketing of cars that are not grand tourers.

== Evolution of the gran turismo car ==
Grand touring car design evolved from vintage and pre-World War II fast touring cars and streamlined closed sports cars.

Italy developed the first gran turismo cars. The small, light-weight, and aerodynamic coupés, named the "Berlinetta", originated in the 1930s. A contemporary French concept, known as "grande routière", emphasised style, elegance, luxury, and gentlemanly transcontinental touring; the grande routières were often larger cars than the Italian gran turismos. Italian designers saw that compared to traditional open two-seat sports car, the increase in weight and frontal area of an enclosed cabin for the driver and mechanic could be offset by the benefits of streamlining to reduce drag. Independent carrozzeria (coachbuilders) provided light and flexible fabric coachwork for powerful short-wheelbase fast-touring chassis by manufacturers such as Alfa Romeo. Later, Carrozzeria Touring of Milan pioneered sophisticated superleggera (super light-weight) aluminum bodywork, allowing for even more aerodynamic forms. The additional comfort of an enclosed cabin was beneficial for the Mille Miglia road race held in Italy's often wintry north.

=== 1929 Alfa Romeo 6C 1750 GT ===
The first car to be named "gran turismo" was the 1929 Alfa Romeo 6C 1750 Gran Turismo, a sporting dual-purpose road/race chassis and engine specification that was available with a wide variety of body styles or carrozzeria. The influential Weymann fabric-bodied berlinetta version by Carrozzeria Touring, "an early example of what we generally perceive to be a GT car", was winner of the Vetture Chiuse category at the 1931 Mille Miglia. An improved and supercharged version, the 6C 1750 GTC Gran Turismo Compressore, won the Vetture a Guida Interna category of the 1932 Mille Miglia. The Alfa Romeo 6C 1750 was designed by Vittorio Jano, who would later be instrumental in the design of the 1951 Lancia Aurelia B20 GT.

=== 1935 Fiat 508 Balilla S berlinetta ===
From the basic Fiat 508 Balilla touring chassis came the SIATA and Fiat aerodynamic gran turismo-style Berlinetta Mille Miglias of 1933 and 1935. Siata was a Turin, Italy-based Fiat tuner, typical of a popular class of Italian artisan manufacturers of small gran turismo, sports and racing cars—usually Fiat based—that came to be known in the 1970s as Etceterini, such as Nardi, Abarth, Ermini and, in 1946, Cisitalia. The Fiat and SIATA berlinettas, influenced by the successful Alfa Romeo 6C GT/GTC coupés, competed in the Mille Miglia endurance race and were significant among Weymann and Superleggera enclosed sporting cars appearing in the 1930s. They featured tuned Fiat engine and chassis, and bespoke carrozzeria, in common with the landmark post-war Cisitalia 202 SC, and are among the first small-displacement gran turismos.

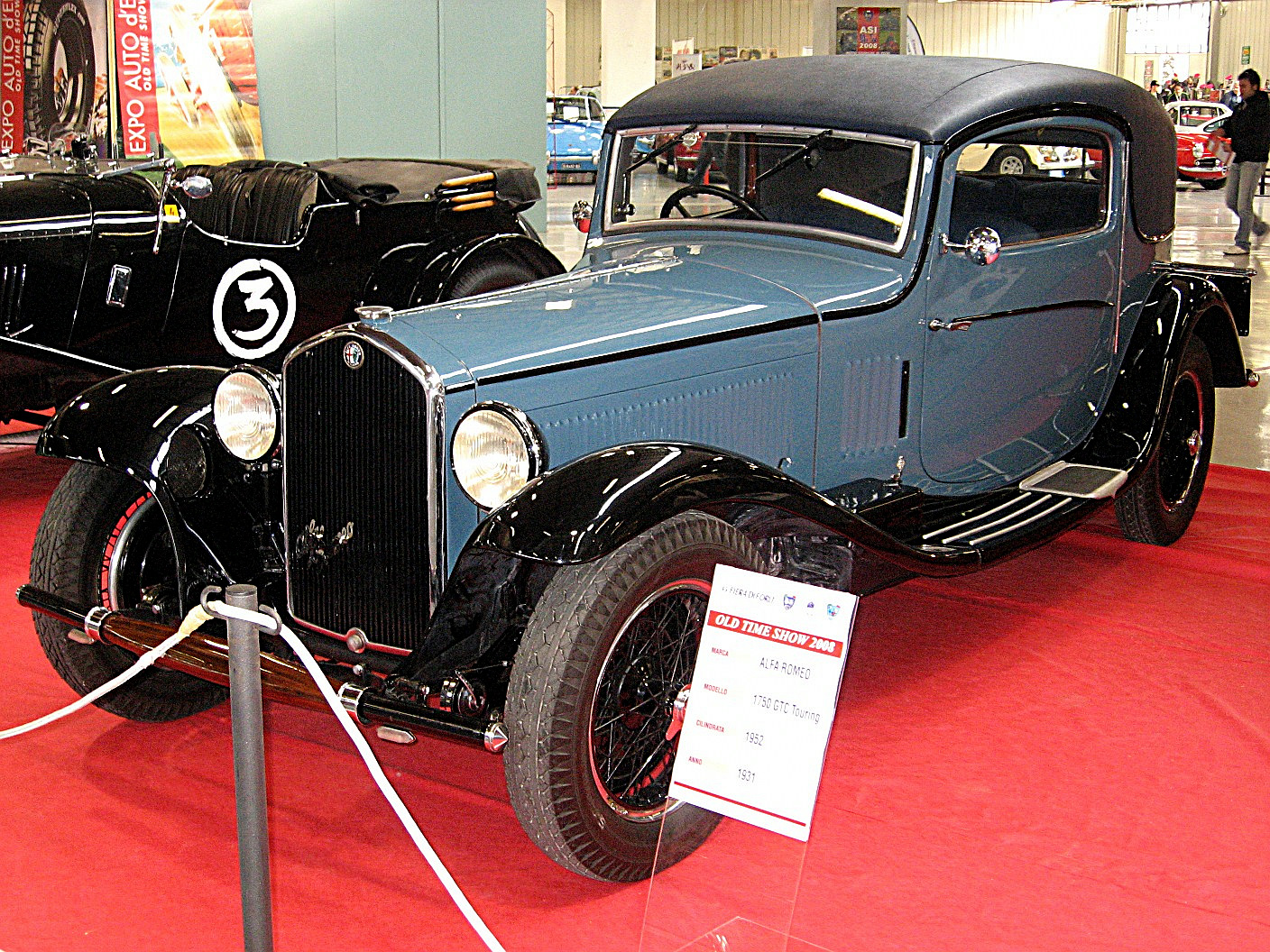
Alfa Romeo 6C 1750 GTC Berlinetta carrozzeriacc touring Mille Miglia 1932

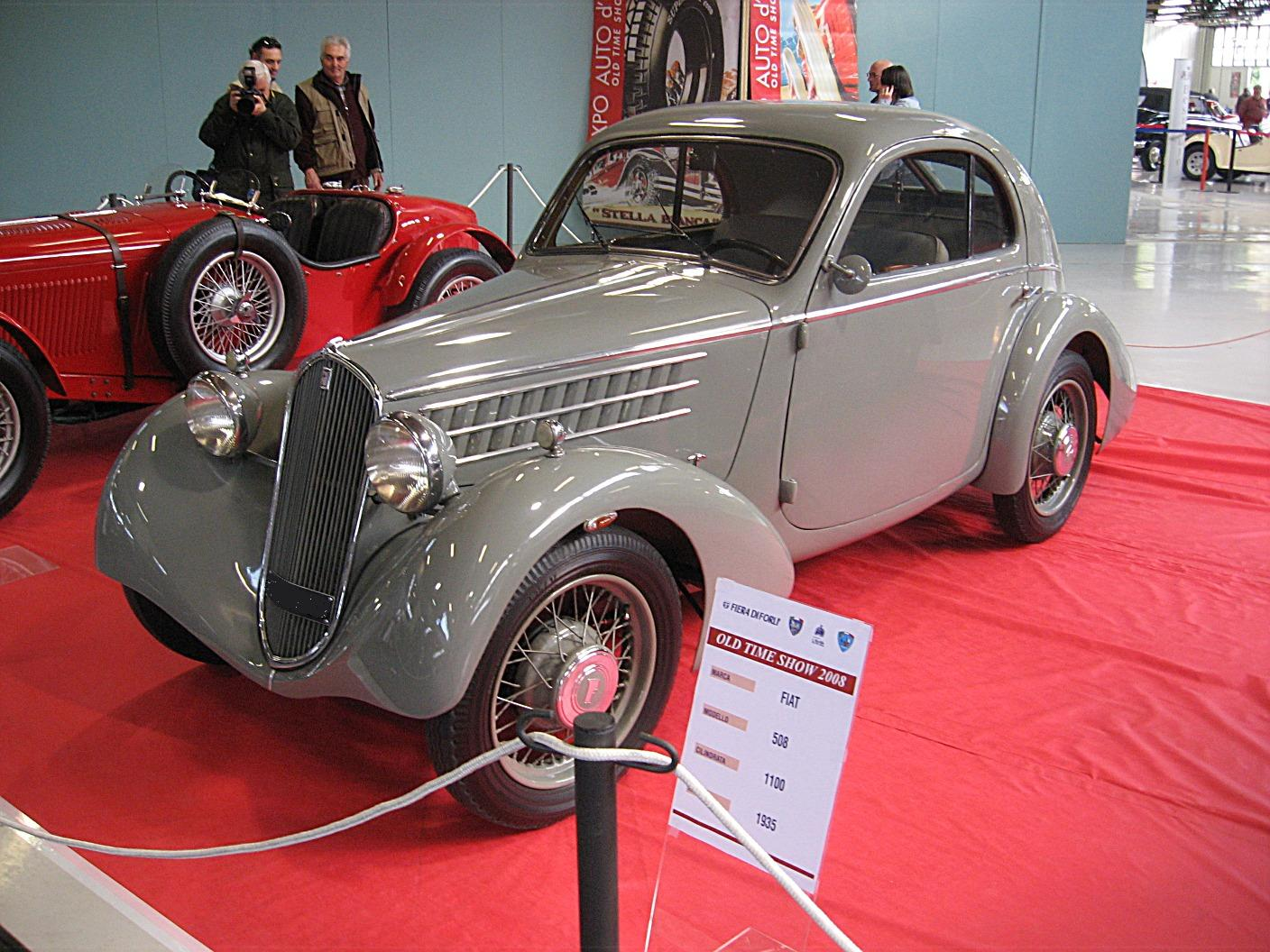
Fiat 508 Balilla S berlinetta Mille Miglia 1935

=== 1947 Cisitalia 202 SC ===
The first recognised motor race specifically for gran turismo cars was the 1949 Coppa Inter-Europa held at Monza. It was initially hoped by Italian motor industry observers that the small and struggling Italian sports and racing car manufacturer, Cisitalia, would find in the 1949 Coppa Inter-Europa regulations (initially called Turismo Veloce or Fast Touring) a category for its Cisitalia Tipo 202 SC—the road-going production coupé version of Cisitalia's single-seat D46 racing car and two-seat 202 open sports car. However, the Fiat-based 1100 cc four-cylinder Cisitalia was no match on the race track for Ferrari's new hand-built 2000 cc V12, and Ferrari dominated, taking the first three places. An 1100 cc class was hurriedly created, but not in time to save Cisitalia's business fortunes—the company's bankrupt owner Piero Dusio had already decamped to Argentina. The Cisitalia 202 SC gained considerable fame for the outstanding design of its Pinin Farina coachwork, and is credited with greatly influencing the style of subsequent berlinetta or fastback gran turismo coupés. A Cisitalia 202 "GT" is exhibited at the Museum of Modern Art in New York City.

=== 1947 Maserati A6 1500 ===
The Maserati A6 1500 won the 1500 cc class at the 1949 Coppa-Europa. It was driven by Franco Bordoni, former fighter ace of the Regia Aeronautica who had debuted as a pilota da corsa at the 1949 Mille Miglia. The A6 1500 was the first road going production car to be offered by the Maserati factory, featuring a tubular chassis with independent front suspension and coil springs, the 1500 cc six-cylinder being derived from the Maserati brothers pre-war voiturette racing engines. The body of the A6 1500 was an elegant two-door fast-back coupé body, also by Pinin Farina.

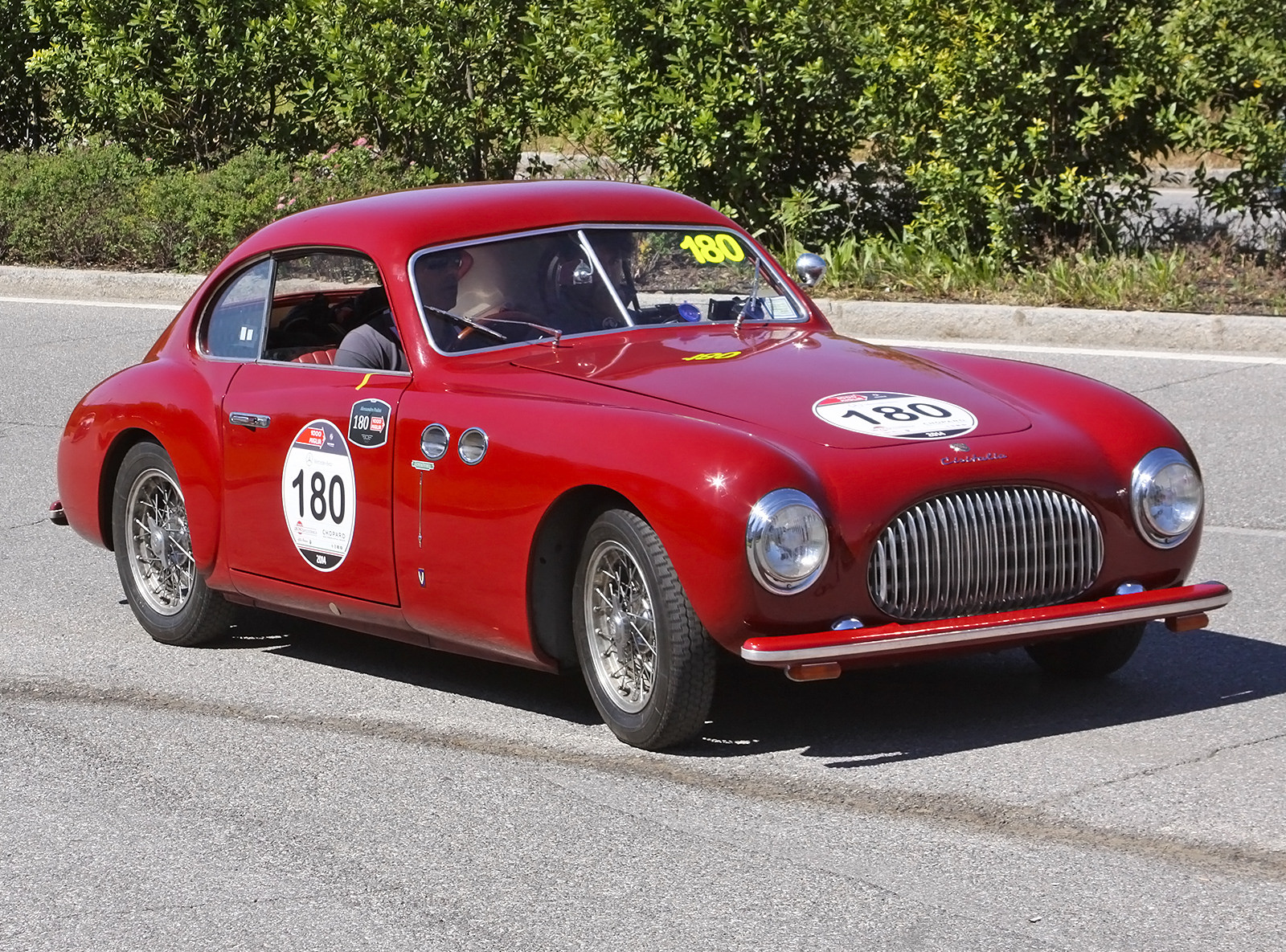
Cisitalia Tipo 202 SC coupé carrozzeria Pinin Farina 1947

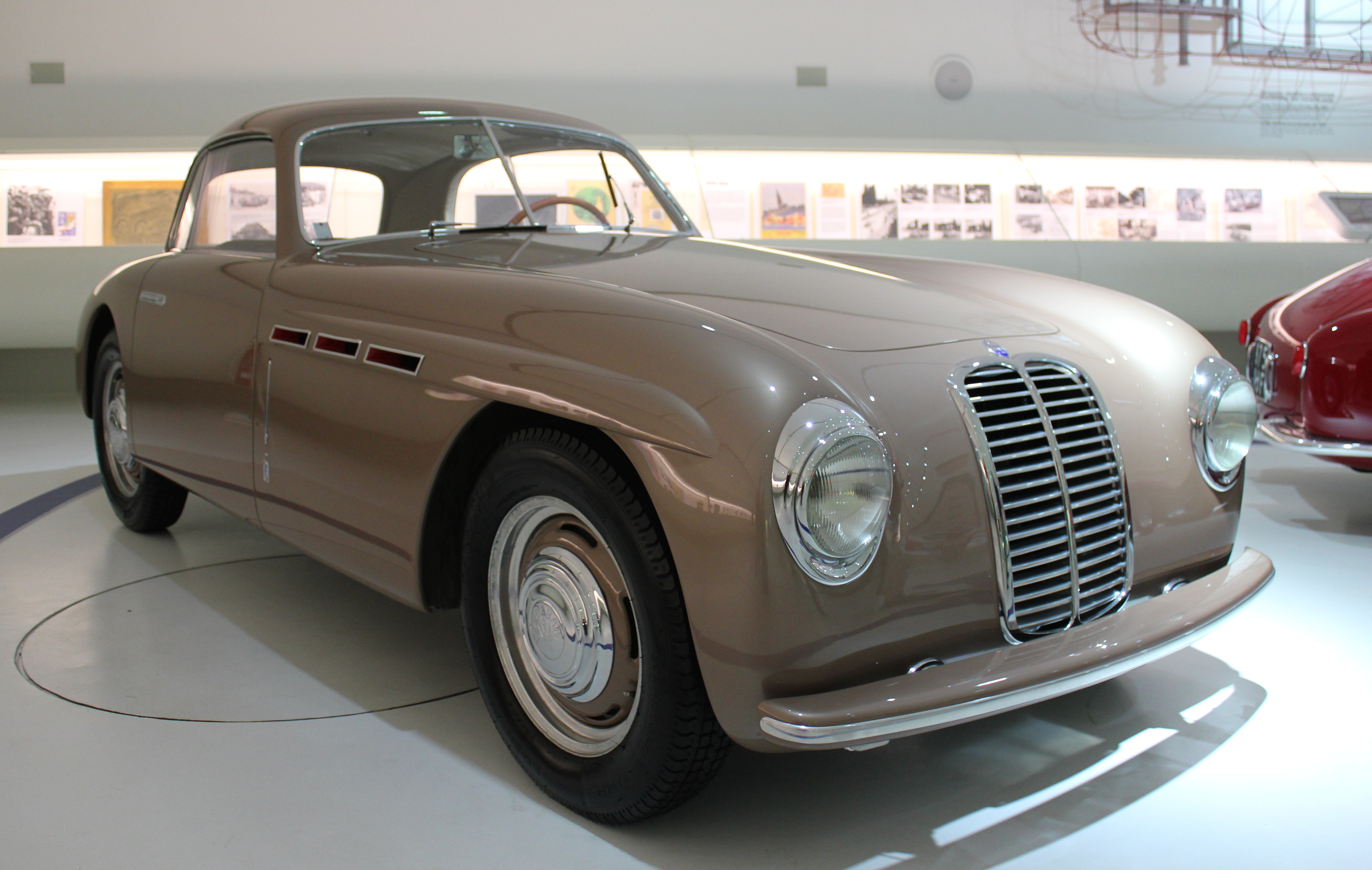
Maserati A6 1500 coupé carrozzeria Pinin Farina 1947

=== 1949 Ferrari 166 Inter ===
Enzo Ferrari, whose Scuderia Ferrari had been the racing division of Alfa Romeo from 1929 until 1938, parted ways from Alfa Romeo in 1939: Enzo Ferrari's first car (itself an Etceterini) the Fiat-based Auto Avio Costruzioni 815 racing sports car, debuted at the 1940 Mille Miglia. Two were produced. The first car constructed in Ferrari's name, the V12 125 S, also a racing sports car, debuted in 1947 at the Piacenza racing circuit. Again, only two were produced, but they rapidly evolved into the 159 and 166 models, including the 1949 Ferrari 166 Inter, a road-going berlinetta coupé with coachwork by Carrozzeria Touring and other coachbuilders.

The Ferrari 166 'Inter' S coupé model won the 1949 Coppa Inter-Europa motor race. Regulations stipulated body form and dimensions but did not at this time specify a minimum production quantity. The car was driven by Bruno Sterzi, and is recognised as the first Ferrari gran turismo.

After that race, the national governing body of Italian motorsport, CSAI (Commissione Sportiva Automobilistica Italiana), officially introduced a new class, called Gran Turismo Internazionale, for cars with production over thirty units per year, thereby ruling out Ferrari's hand-built berlinettas.

=== 1951 Ferrari 212 Export ===
Ferrari's response for the new Italian Gran Turismo Internazionale championship in 1951 was the road/race Ferrari 212. Twenty-seven short-wheelbase competition versions called Export, some with increasingly popular gran turismo-style berlinetta coupé coachwork, were produced for enthusiasts (Ferrari called the first example 212 MM) while the road version was called Inter. The Ferrari 212 Export featured long-range fuel tanks, high compression pistons and triple Weber 32 DCF carburettors; power was 170 bhp from the 2600cc Gioacchino Colombo-designed 'short-block' V12 engine, evolved from the earlier Ferrari 166 (2000cc) and 195 (2300cc). All versions came with the standard Ferrari five-speed non-synchromesh gearbox and hydraulic drum brakes. All 1951 Ferraris shared a double tube frame chassis design evolved from the 166. Double-wishbone front suspension with transverse leaf spring, and live rear axle with semi-elliptic leaf springs and radius rods were employed. The Ferrari 212 Export (212 MM) gran turismo berlinetta (chassis No. 0070M) debuted in first-place overall at the April 1951 Coppa Inter-Europa, driven by Luigi Villoresi, and in June (chassis no. 0092E) was first in the gran turismo category at the Coppa della Toscana driven by Milanese Ferrari concessionaire and proprietor of Scuderia Guastalla, Franco Cornacchia. The 212 Export continued to serve Ferrari well in the Sports and GT categories until replaced by the 225 S, and although it would later be overshadowed by the internationally famous 250 GT, the 212 Export was an important model in the successful line of Colombo-engined V12 GT cars that made Ferrari legendary.

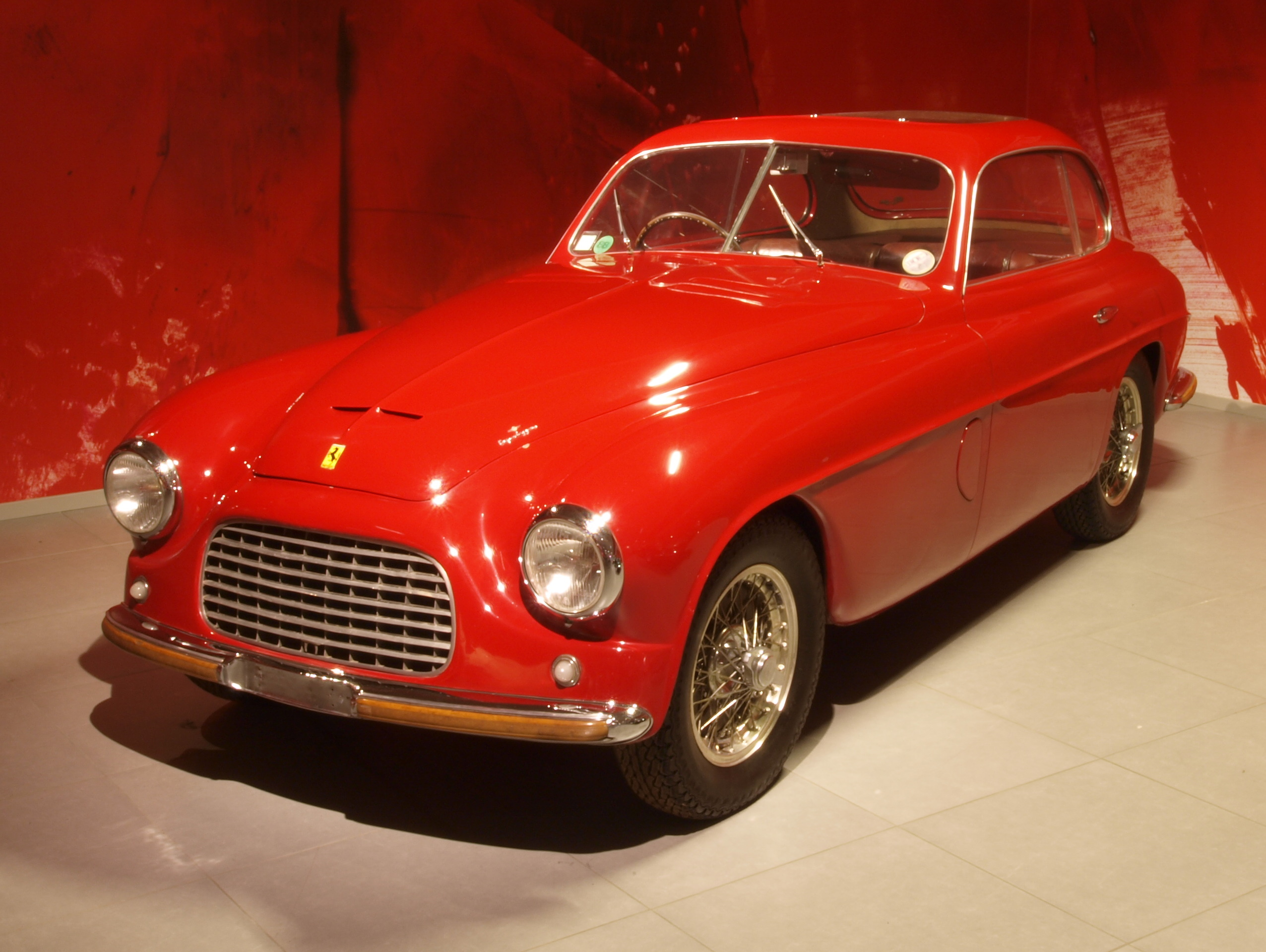
Ferrari 166 Inter coupé carrozzeria touring 1949

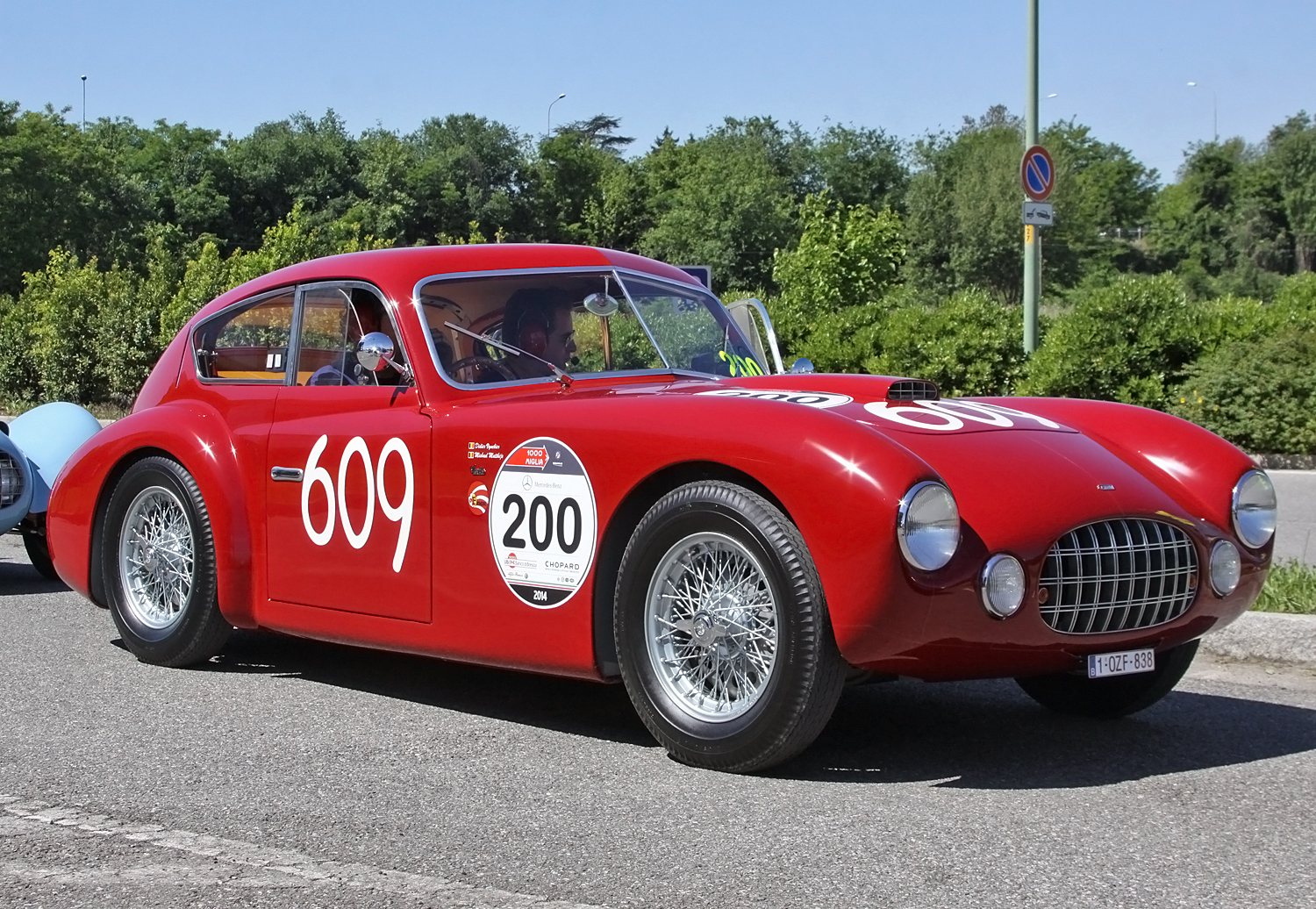
Etceterini: Ermini 1100 berlinetta Motto 1950

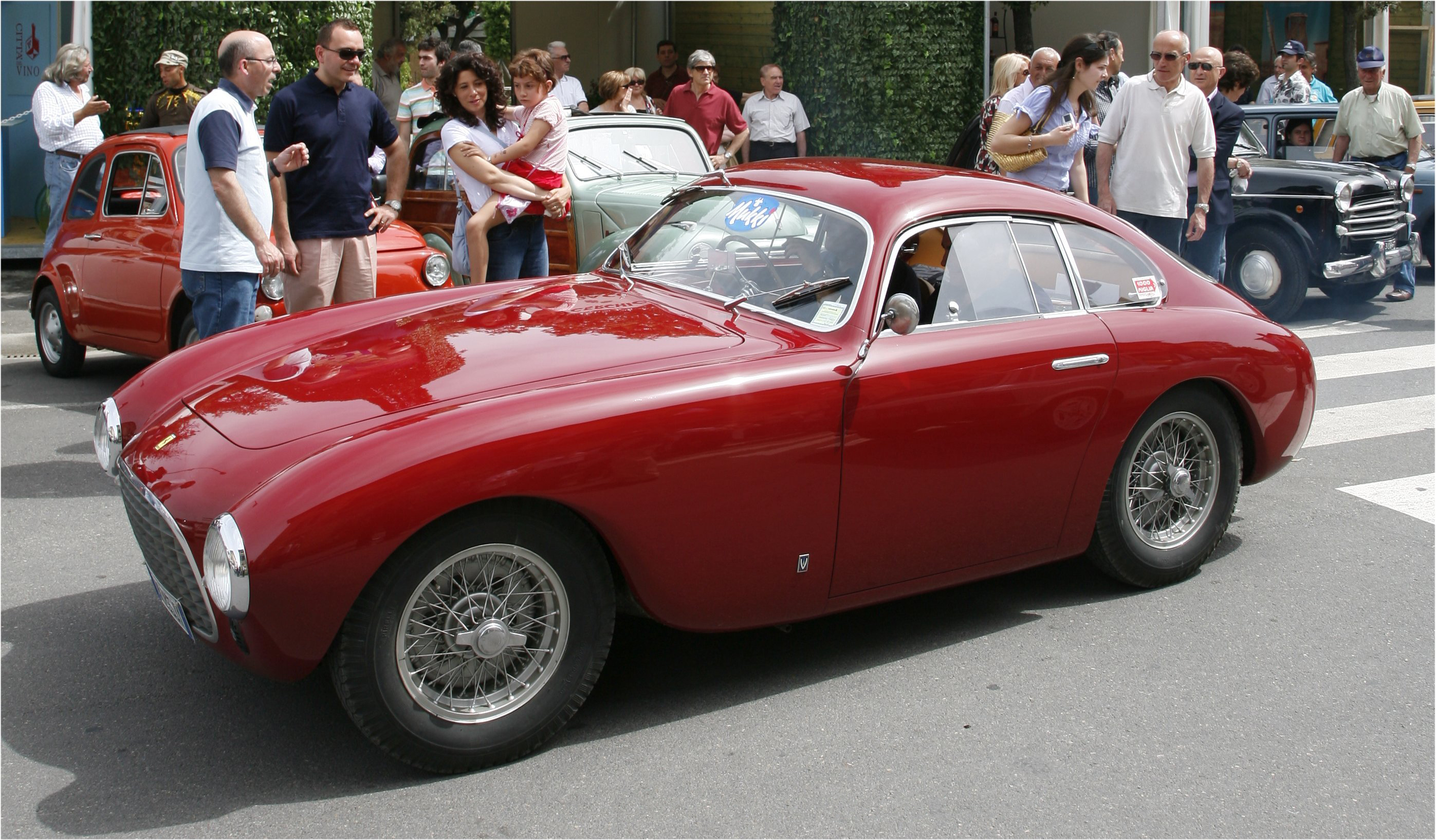
Ferrari 212 Export Vignale coupé 1951

=== 1951 Lancia Aurelia B20 GT ===
1951 was the debut of Lancia's Aurelia B20 GT.

Lancia had begun production in 1950 of their technically advanced Aurelia saloon; the design had been overseen by Vittorio Jano. At the 1951 Turin Motor Show, the Pinin Farina-bodied gran turismo B20 coupé version was unveiled to an enthusiastic motoring public. Here, finally, according to historians Jonathan Wood and Sam Dawson, was a fully realised production GT car, representing the starting point of the definitive grand tourer:

This outwardly conventional saloon bristled with innovation and ingenuity, in which the masterly hand of Vittorio Jano is apparent. In the B20 are elements of the Cistalia of 1947, coupés which Pinin undertook on a 6C Alfa Romeo and Maserati in 1948, along with the Fiat 1100 S coupé with its rear accommodation for children. The original Aurelia had been under-powered and, in 1951, the V6 was enlarged to 1991 cc, which was also extended to the coupé, though in 75 rather than 70 bhp form as the B20 was developed as a sporting model in its own right. In addition the B20 had a shorter wheelbase and a higher rear axle ratio, making it a 100 mph car. Lancia chose the Gran Turismo name for its new model and the suggestion could only have come from Vittorio Jano himself, for had he not been responsible for the original 1750 Alfa Romeo of the same name back in 1929?

Four semi-ufficiali works B20 GTs, together with a number of privateer entrants, were sent to the Mille Miglia in April 1951, where the factory Bracco / Maglioli car finished second overall, behind only a Ferrari sports racer of twice the engine capacity. Lancia Aurelias swept the GT 2.0 Litre division. In June 1951, Bracco was partnered with the "father of GT racing" himself, Johnny Lurani, to race a B20 GT at Le Mans, where they were victorious in the 2.0 litre sportscar division, placing 12th overall. A 1–2 finish at the famous Coppa d'Oro delle Dolomiti, among other victories including the 6 Ore di Pescara, rounded out the debut racing season for this car, winning its division in the Italian GT Championship for Umberto Castiglioni in 1951. Lancia B20 GTs would go on to win the over 2.0 litre Italian GT Championship in 1953, 1954 and 1955 with the B20-2500.

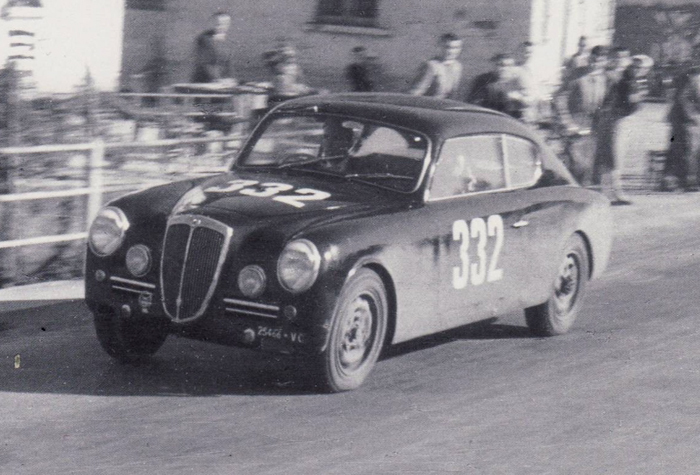
Lancia Aurelia B20 in the 1951 Mille Miglia

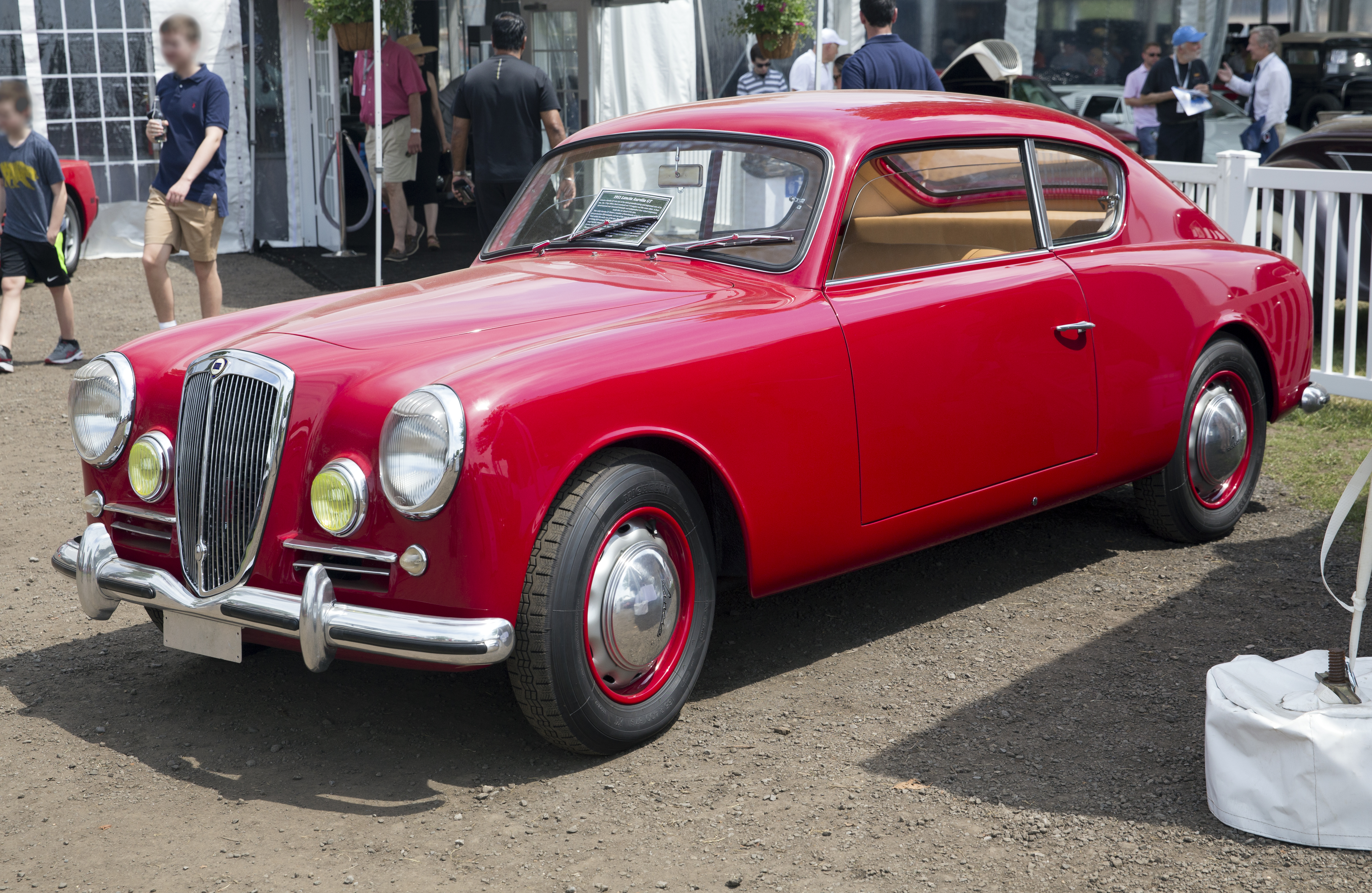
1951 Lancia Aurelia B20 GT

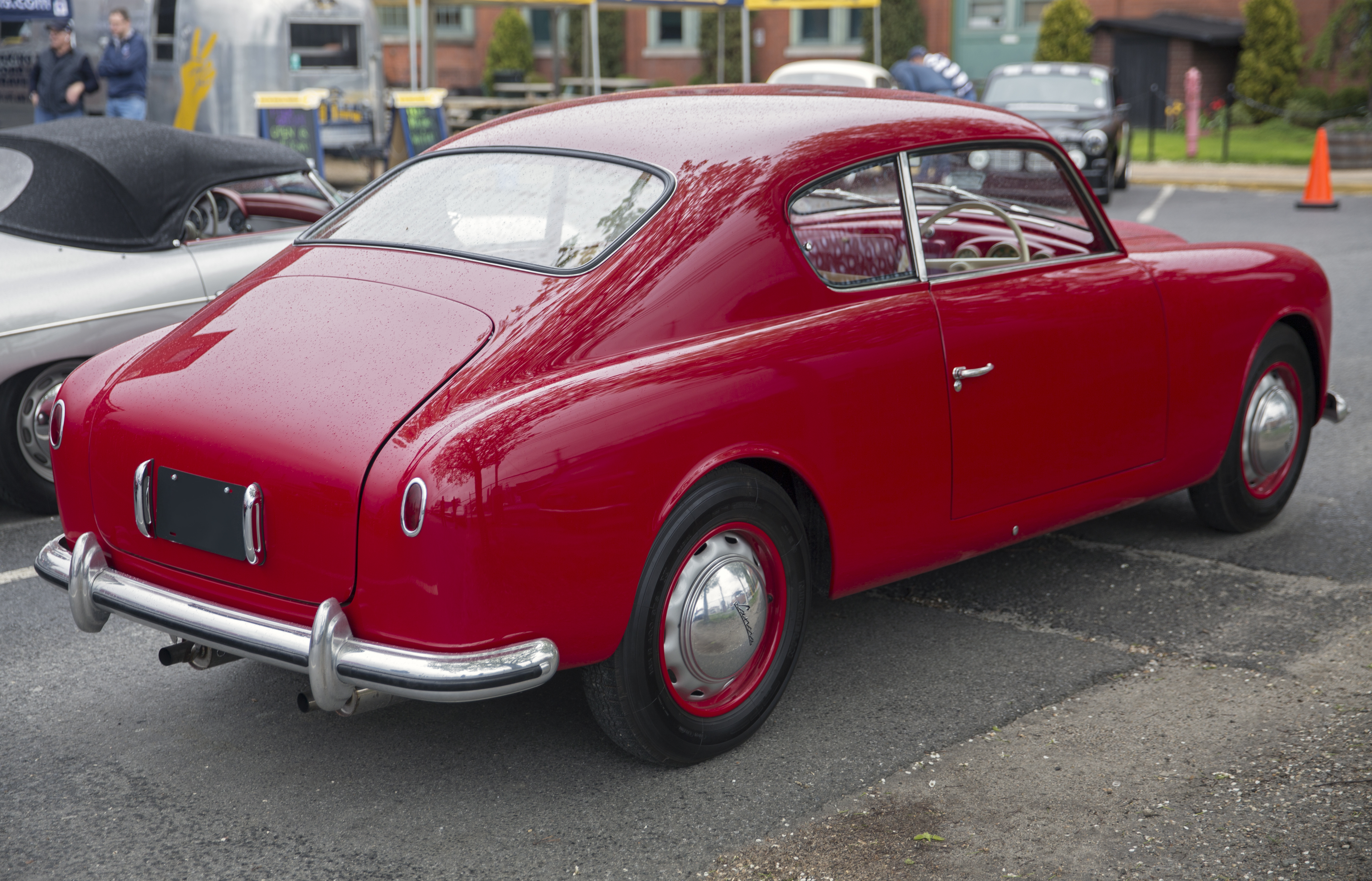
1951 Lancia Aurelia B20 GT

=== 1952 Fiat 8V "Otto Vu" Zagato ===
A surprise to the international press, who were not expecting a gran turismo berlinetta from Italy's largest manufacturer of everyday standard touring models, the Fiat 8V "Otto Vu" was unveiled at the Geneva Salon in March 1952 to international acclaim. Although not raced by the factory, the Otto Vu was raced by a number of private owners. Vincenzo Auricchio and Piero Bozzinio raced to fifth in the gran turismo category of the 1952 Mille Miglia, and Ovidio Capelli placed third in the GT 2000 cc class at the Coppa della Toscana in June, with a special race-spec lightweight Zagato coupe; the GT category overall at this event was won by Franco Cornacchia's Ferrari 212 Export (refer above). Capelli and the 8V Zagato topped this accomplishment by winning the GT category of the Pescara 12 Hours in August, ahead of two Lancias. The new Fiat 8V garnered sufficient competition points over the season to become the national two-litre GT Champion (a feat it repeated every year until 1959).

Elio Zagato, the coachbuilder's son, was successful in competition with the Otto Vu in 1954 and 1955, attracting further customer interest and leading Zagato to eventually develop two different GT racing versions. Upon his death in 2009, Elio Zagato was described as a leading figure of Italian GT racing and design:

Elio Zagato, who has died aged 88, was one of the leading figures of Italian Gran Turismo (GT) racing and car-body design. In the 1950s, driving a Zagato-bodied Fiat 8V, Elio emerged as the consummate gentleman racer in Italian GT championship events. Zagato, his father's firm, provided the lithe, lightweight aluminium bodies for many of the Lancias, Alfa Romeos, Abarths and Maseratis that dominated these meetings. Elio won 82 races out of the 150 he entered, and won four of the five championships he entered. Working with the chief stylist Ercole Spada, Zagato produced some of the most beautiful GT designs of the era; spare and muscular cars such as the Aston Martin DB4GTZ, the Alfa Romeo Junior TZ and SZ, and the Lancia Flaminia Sport. These were minimalist shapes bereft of superfluous trim that introduced phrases such as "double bubble" roof to the car body design language: twin shallow domes, devised by Elio, to give extra head room and strengthen the roof. For lightness, Zagato pioneered the use of Perspex and of aerodynamics, with trademark forms such as the split or stub tail. Indeed, Elio would take prototypes out on the autostrada covered in wool tufts in order to test air flow over the body.

The 8V Otto Vu is named after its V8 engine (Since Ford had already trademarked "V8").

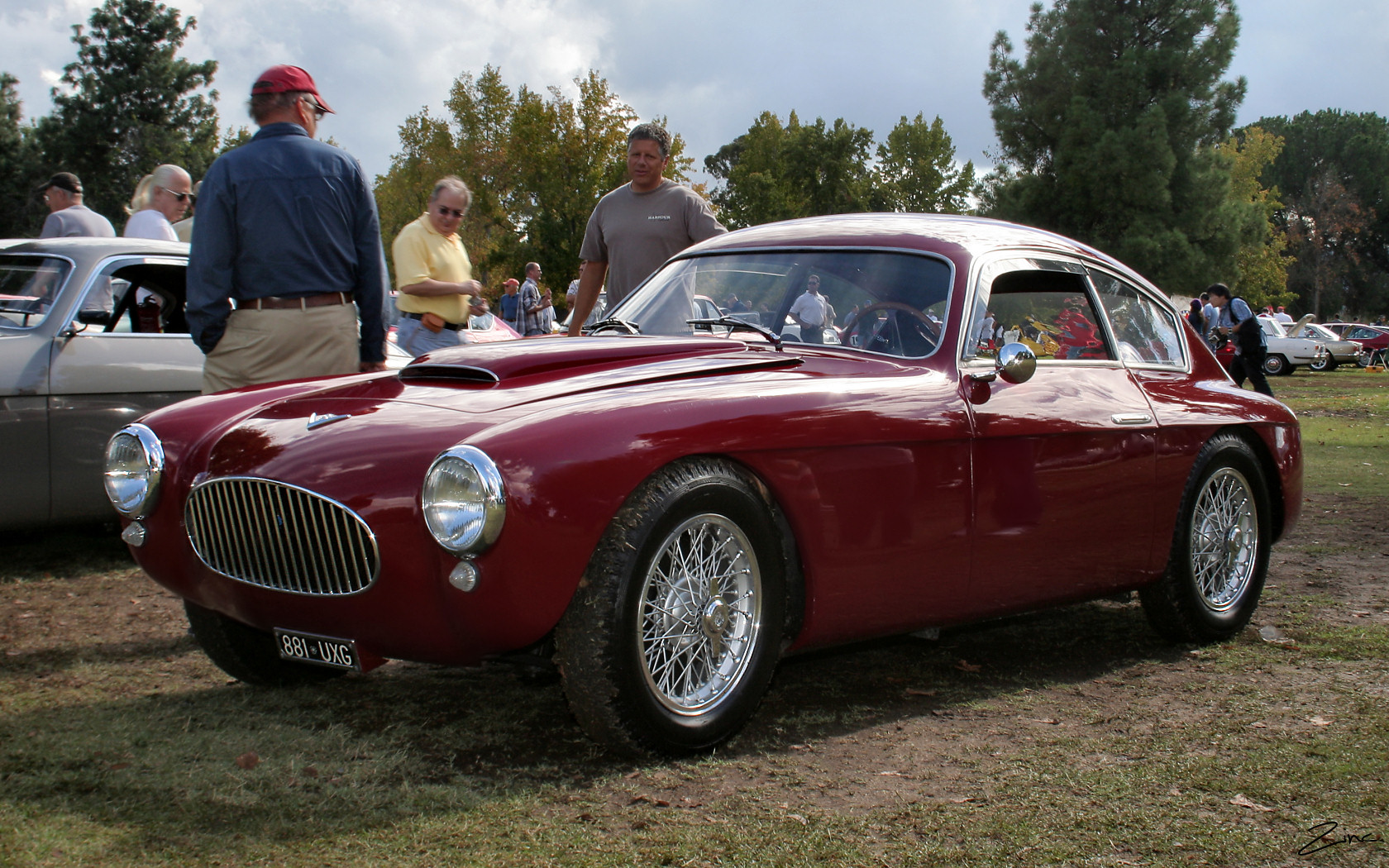
Fiat 8V Zagato

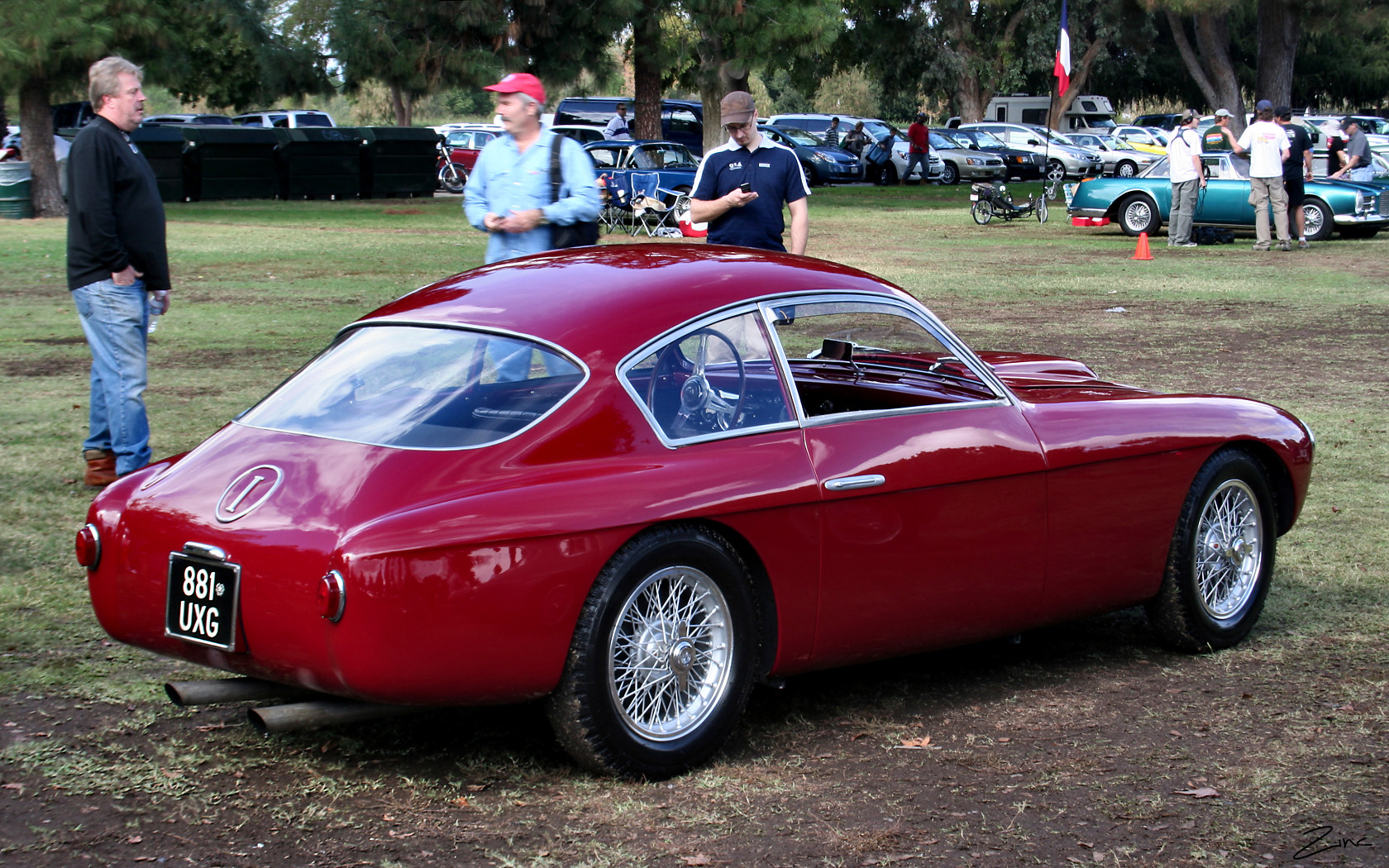

=== 1954 Mercedes-Benz 300SL ===
The German automotive industry was devastated by the second World War, but in the post-war period a small number of firms brought it to prominence again. The emergence of the classic Porsche 356 is covered in the accompanying sports car article. In 1957 author John Stanford wrote: "The post-war Mercedes sports cars are in a way even more remarkable than those of Porsche. The firm was particularly badly hit by the war and it was several years before anything but a nominal production of cars could be undertaken. In 1951 appeared the "300", a luxurious and fast touring car with a single-camshaft six-cylinder engine of 2996 c.c. and chassis derived from the pre-war cars with swing-axle rear suspension. The "300S" was a three-carburetor edition, but in 1952 great interest was aroused by the almost invincible performance in sports-car racing of a team of prototype cars of extremely advanced and interesting design. By 1954 these had undergone sufficient development to be placed on the market as the "300SL", one of the costliest and most desirable cars of our time. The conventional chassis has been abandoned in favor of a complex structure of welded tubes, although the coil spring suspension is retained, and exceptionally large brakes are fitted, inboard at the rear. The engine is sharply inclined to the near-side in the interests of a low bonnet-line, and with Bosch fuel injection produces 240 bhp at 6,000 rpm. Claimed maximum speed is in excess of 160 mph and although the car is by no means small, dry weight has been kept to 23 cwt. The depth of the multi-tubular frame prevents the use of conventional side-hinged doors and these cars are fitted with the roof-hinged "gull-wing" doors which characterise an exceedingly handsome and practical car. An open touring version is available. In competition the "300SL" has become a powerful contender, and abetted by the success of the Grand Prix cars [and "300 SLR"] has captured a substantial portion of the export market."

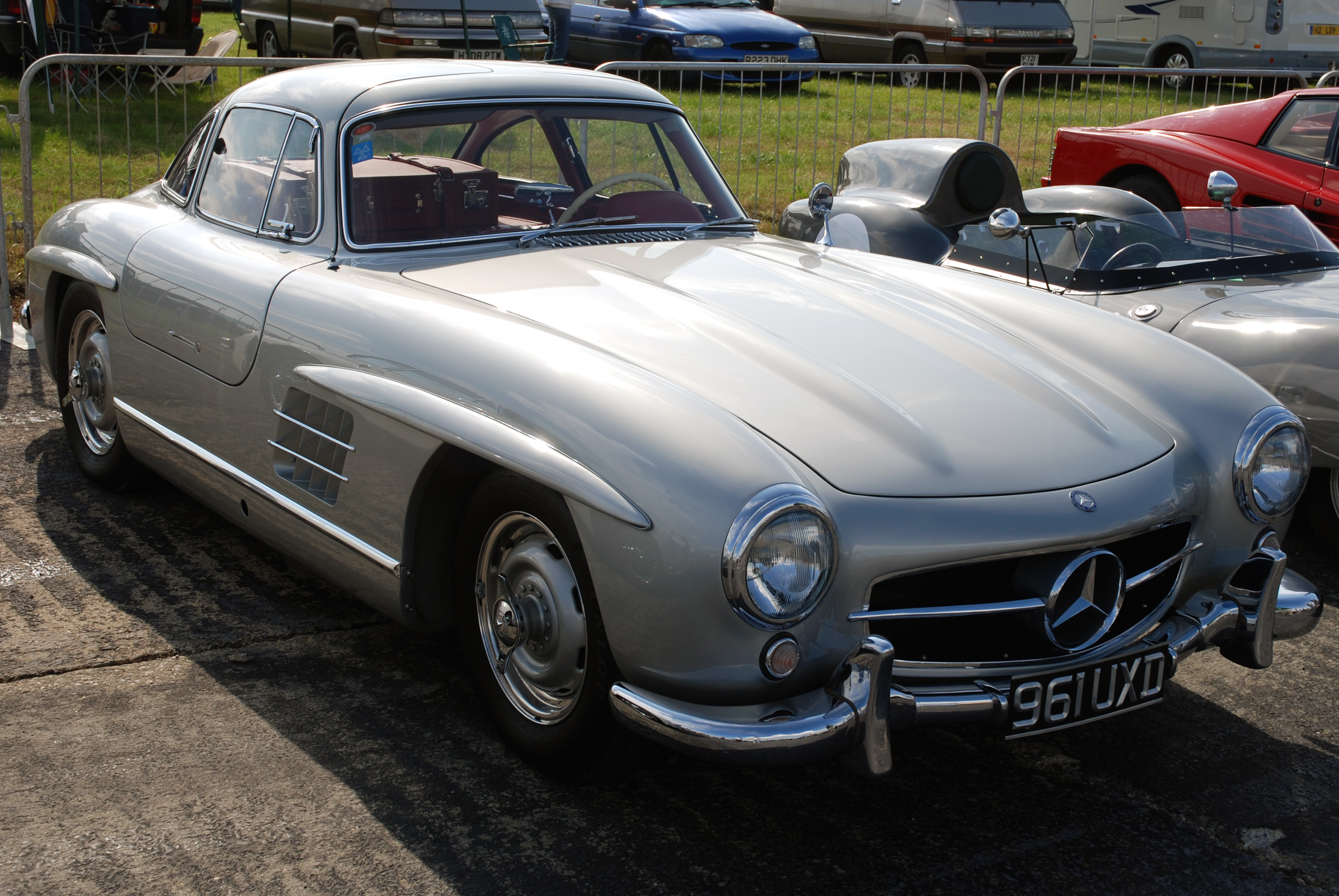
Mercedes-Benz 300 SL

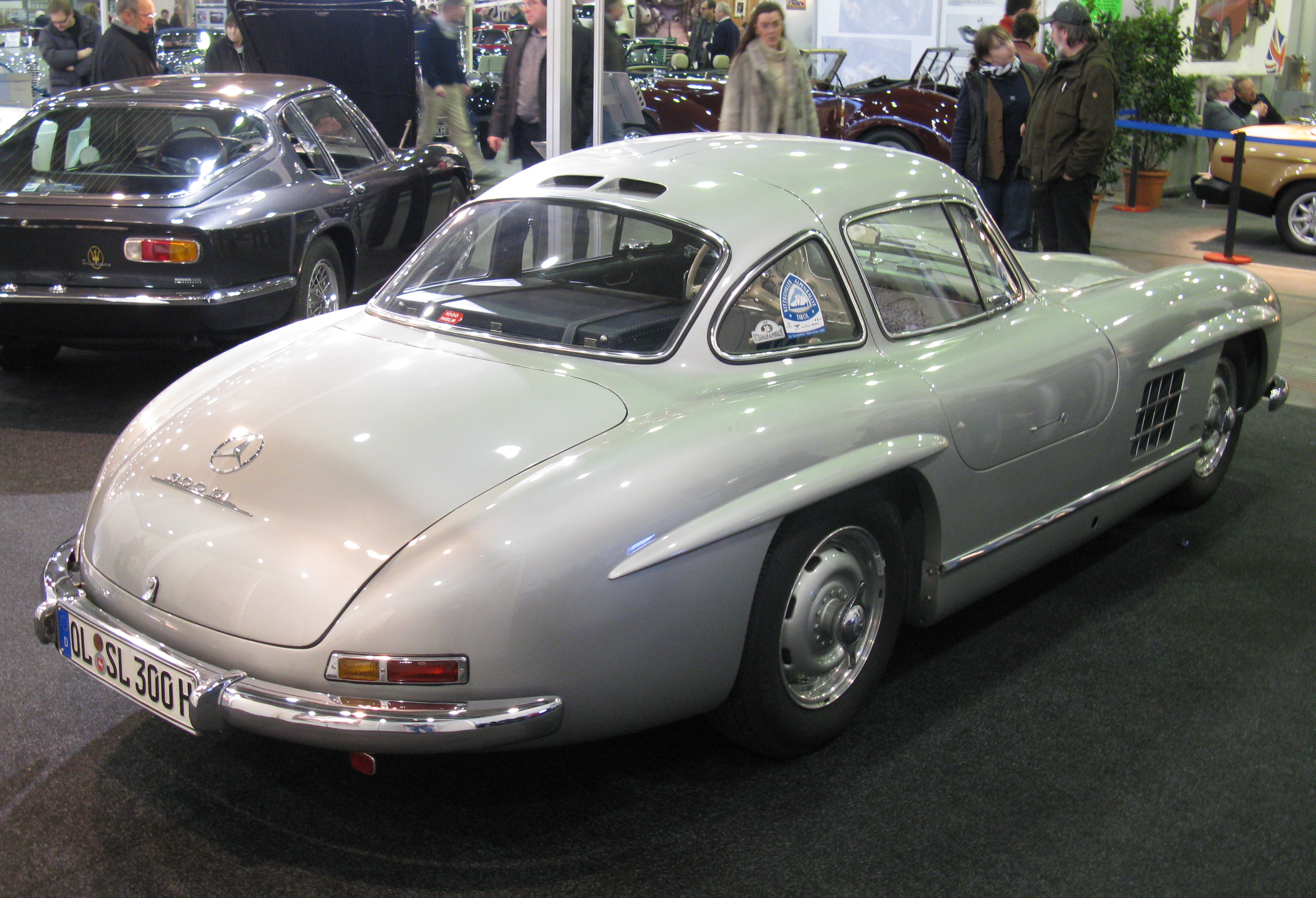
Mercedes-Benz 300 SL

=== 1956 Ferrari 250 GT ===
The 250GT Ferrari must surely represent the ultimate in modern high-speed sporting travel, or GT competition, and holds today a position similar to the Bugatti 57SC of 1939. In 1962 the GTO Ferrari coupés had a remarkable season of successes in G.T. racing and have become the standard by which any competition coupé is measured, and by steady development [the Ferrari 250GT] has become one of the world's greatest cars.

— Motor Sport, March 1963.

1953 saw the first serious attempt to series produce the Ferrari motor car, two models of the Type 250 Europa being produced. The cars were an evolution of the previous models, available with either the Colombo or Lampredi versions of the 250 V12 engine, coil spring front suspension, an improved sports gearbox (four speeds) with Porsche synchromesh, large drum brakes and luxurious outfitting. A few appeared in motorsports but did not initially threaten the international Mercedes-Benz 300 SL and Porsche 356 competition.

In the Mille Miglia of 1956 the first of the lightweight grand touring coupés, driven by Gendebien, battled with the Mercedes 300SL of Metternich and Einsendel to come in fifth overall and first in G.T. over 2,000 c.c. The G.T. Ferrari had arrived! Motor Sport, March 1963.

After its 1956 debut, the 250 GT "went from strength to strength". Powered by the Colombo 250 engine, output was up to 240 bhp at 7,000 rpm A short-wheelbase (SWB) version of the 250 chassis was employed for improved handling and road-holding in corners, and top speed was up to 157 m.p.h. In 1957 Gendebien finished third overall in the Mille Miglia, and won the "index of performance". Alfonso de Portago won the Tour de France and GT races at Montlhéry and Castelfusano in a lightweight Carrozzeria Scaglietti 250 GT. Gendebien became a gran turismo specialist in 250 GTs when he wasn't driving sports racing Ferrari Testa Rossas ("Red Heads" for their red engine covers), achieving success in both the Giro Sicilia and Tour de France.

In 1958, sports racing Testa Rossas swept the Manufacturer's Championship, and in 1959 the T.R. engine was adapted to the 250 GT. The spark plugs were relocated and each cylinder now had a separate intake port. Larger Weber twin-choke carburetors were employed in a triple configuration (sports racing T.R.s employed six) and some special customer cars had three four-choke Webers (one choke per cylinder). Dry-sump lubrication was employed, and the camshaft valve timing was only slightly less than the full-race Testa Rossas. G.T. power was up to 267 bhp at 7,000 rpm (240 bhp at 6,800 rpm for road versions). Experiments were conducted with Dunlop disc brakes, which were adopted in 1960, along with an even shorter wheelbase for competizione versions.

In 1962, the definitive competition gran turismo was unveiled, the 250 GTO. A full Testa Rossa engine was employed (albeit with black crinkle-finish engine covers) with six twin-choke Webers. Power was up to 300 bhp at 7,400 rpm and with a lightweight 2000 lb body and chassis: the car was an immediate winner.

Remarkable as it might be on the circuit, it is also a remarkable machine on the road. One American Ferrarist, who owned and raced many G.T. Ferraris, commented that the G.T.O. is an even more pleasant car on the road! He maintains that it is most tractable and overheating in traffic congestions is no problem. In its short lifetime the 250GTO has established an enviable record. It is also one of the most sought after competition cars as evidenced by recent European suggestions that "black market" G.T.O.s bring higher prices than new ones. The demand is greater than the supply.

— Motor Sport, March 1963.

In November 2016, it was reported that a 1962 Ferrari 250 GTO was being offered for public sale—normally brokers negotiate deals between extremely wealthy collectors "behind closed doors". GTOs had previously been auctioned in 1990 and 2014. The 2017 sale was expected to reach US$56,000,000.00, the particular GTO concerned (the second of just thirty-six ever made) thus set to become the world's most expensive car.

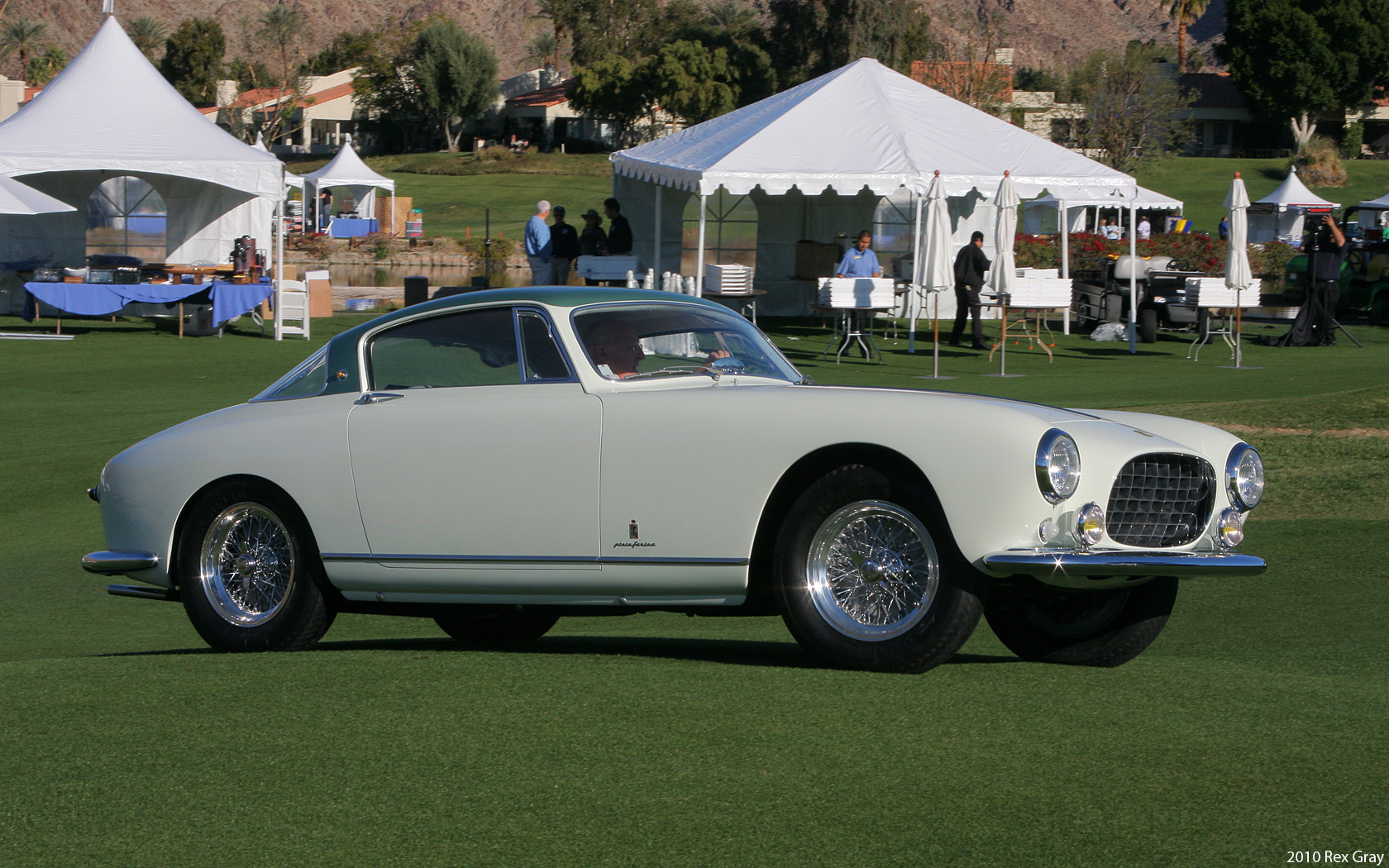
1953 Ferrari 250 Europa

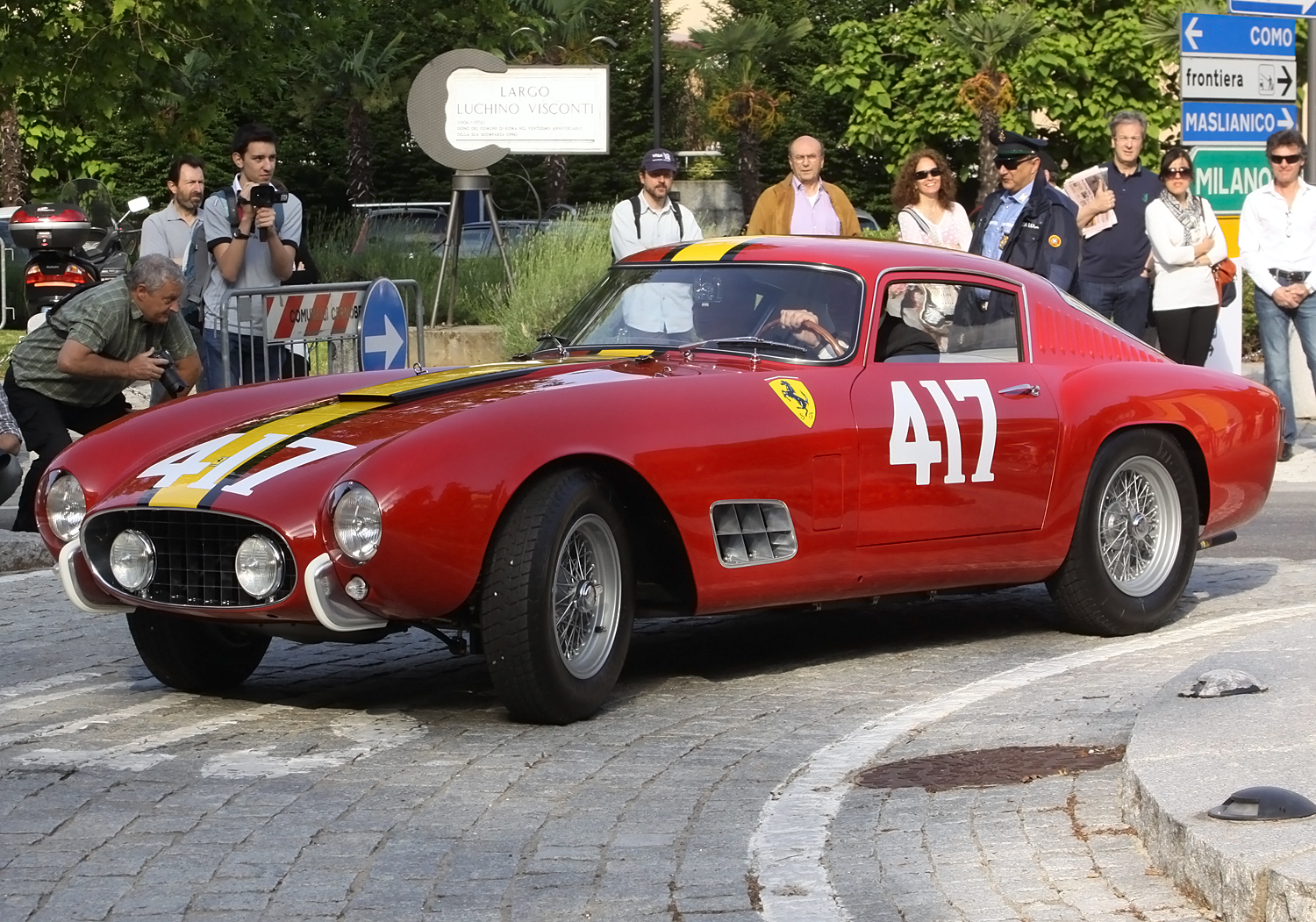
1957 Ferrari 250 GT Berlinetta Tour de France Scaglietti

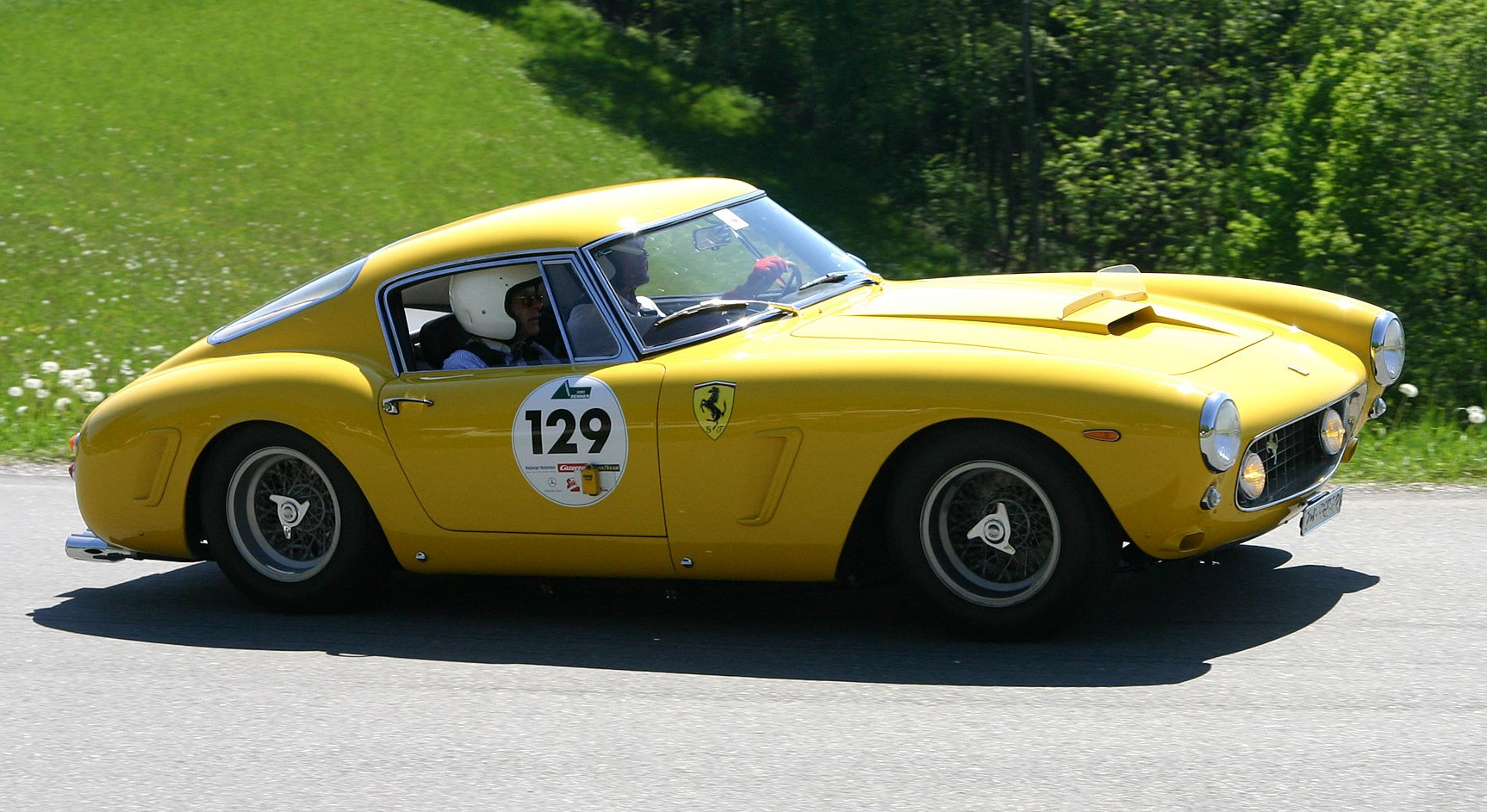
1959 Ferrari 250 GT berlinetta SWB

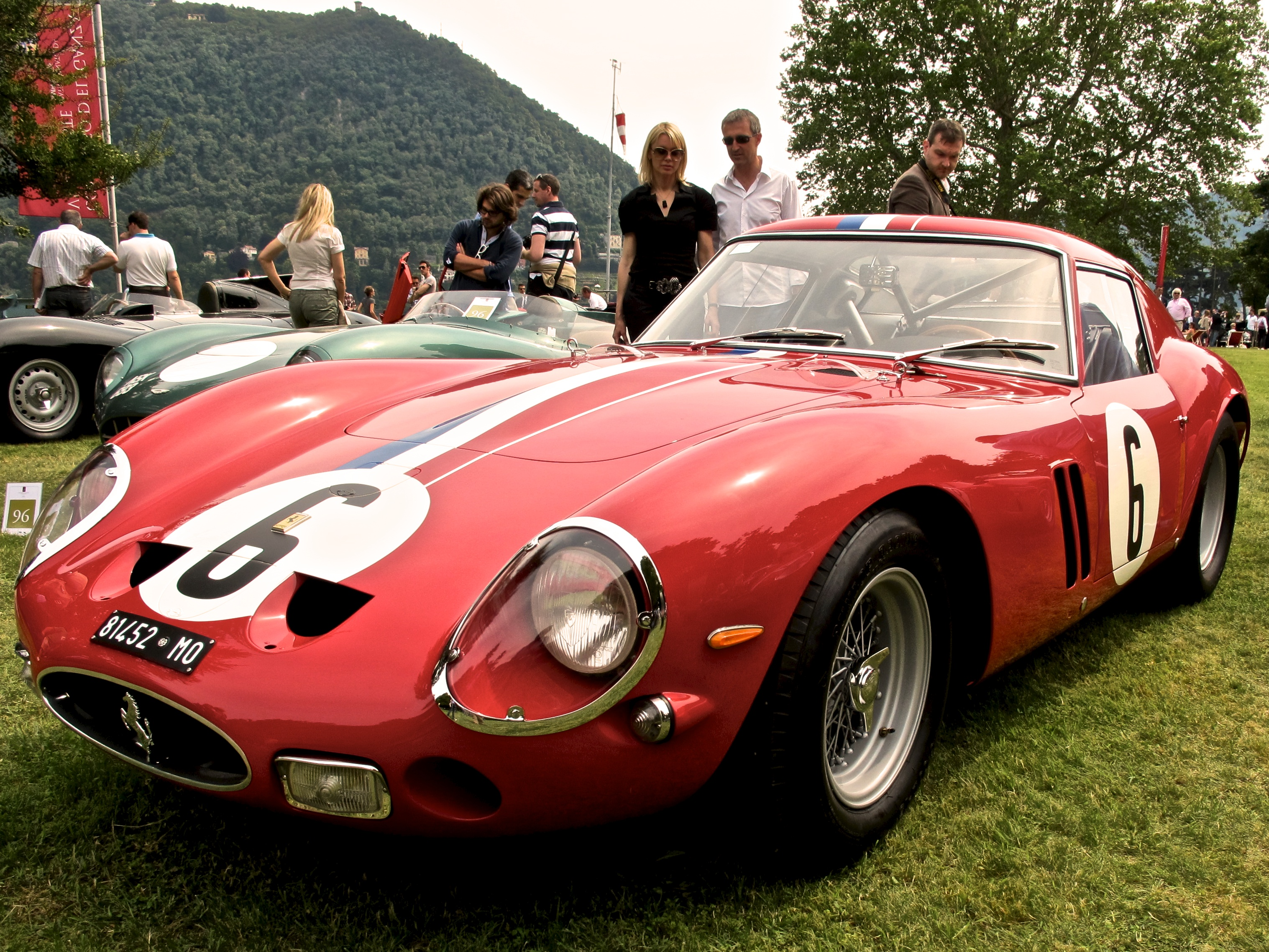
1962 Ferrari 250 GTO

== Impact of racing ==
The Italian Mille Miglia thousand-mile race, held from 1927 to 1957, was central to the evolution of the gran turismo concept. The event was one of the most important on the Italian motor-sport calendar and could attract up to five million spectators. Winning drivers such as Tazio Nuvolari, Rudolf Caracciola, and Stirling Moss; and manufacturers such as Alfa Romeo, BMW, Ferrari and Porsche would become household names.

According to Enzo Ferrari:

In my opinion, the Mille Miglia was an epoch-making event, which told a wonderful story. The Mille Miglia created our cars and the Italian car industry. The Mille Miglia permitted the birth of GT, or grand touring cars, which are now sold all over the world. The Mille Miglia proved that by racing over open roads for 1,000 miles, there were great technical lessons to be learned by the petrol and oil companies and by brake, clutch, transmission, electrical and lighting component manufacturers, fully justifying the old adage that motor racing improves the breed.

The Mille Miglia is still celebrated today as one of the world's premier historic racing events.

A closed sports coupé almost prevailed at Le Mans in 1938, when a carrozzeria touring-bodied Alfa Romeo 8C 2900B, driven by Raymond Sommer and Clemente Biondetti, led the famous 24-hour race from the third lap until early Sunday afternoon, retiring only due to engine problems.

Johnny Lurani was impressed by the dominant performance at the Mille Miglia in 1940, by a carrozzeria touring-bodied BMW 328 coupé, winning the event at over 100 mph average speed, driven by Fritz Huschke von Hanstein and Walter Bäumer:

The BMW team included a splendid aerodynamic Berlinetta, wind tunnel designed by German specialists, that was extremely fast at 135 mph... I couldn't believe the speeds these BMWs were capable of.

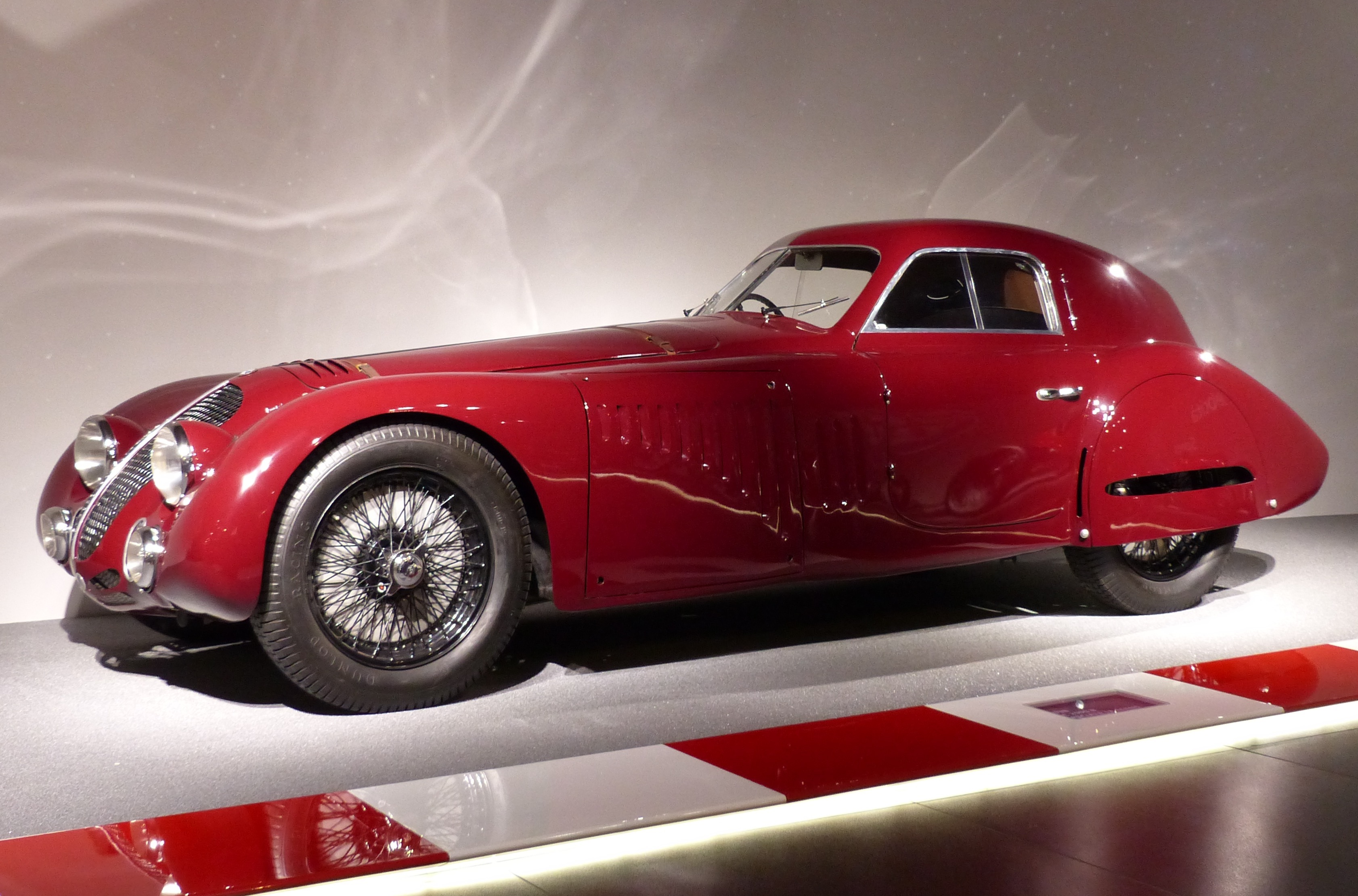
1938 Alfa Romeo 2900B carrozzeria touring Le Mans

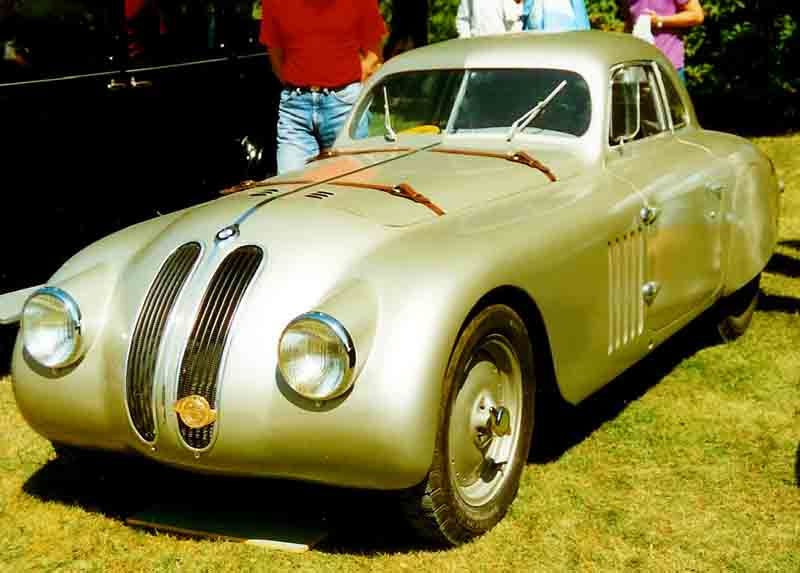
1940 BMW 328 coupé carrozzeria touring Mille Miglia

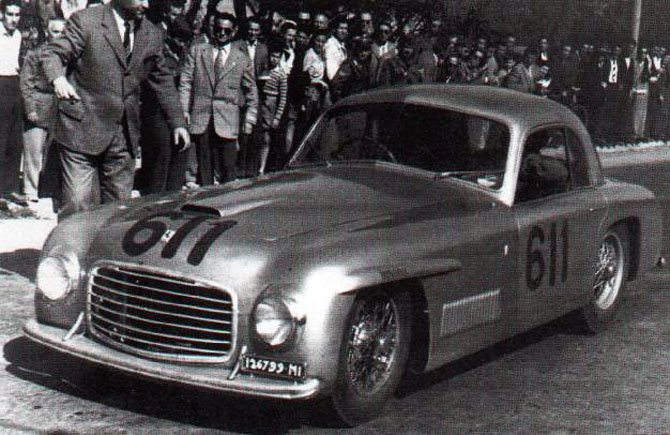
1948 Ferrari 166 S No. 003S, berlinetta coachwork by Carrozzeria Allemano, at the 1949 Mille Miglia

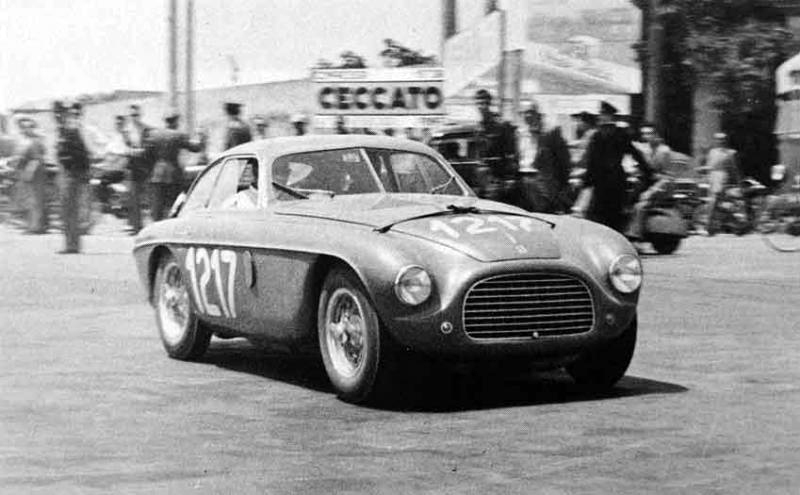
1950 Ferrari 195 S berlinetta by Carrozzeria Touring, at the Coppa della Toscana. Chassis No. 0026M. Outright winner of the 1950 Mille Miglia, driven by Gianni Marzotto in a double-breasted suit.

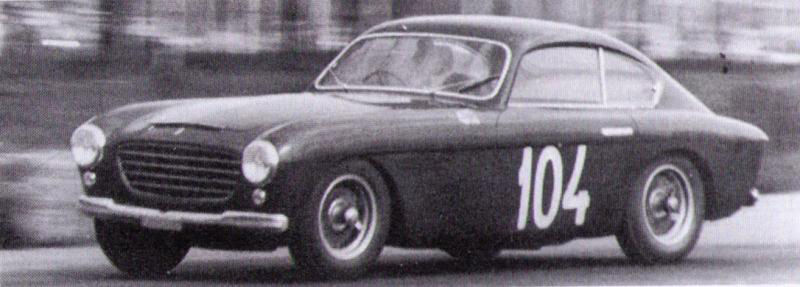
1951 Ferrari 195 Inter coupé by Vignale. Chassis No. 0083S. At the Coppa Intereuropa at Monza.

=== 1937–1948 CSAI ===
Italy's national governing body of motorsport was the Commissione Sportiva Automobilistica Italiana (CSAI). Count Giovanni Lurani Cernuschi (popularly known as Johnny Lurani) was a key commissioner. He was also a senior member of the world governing body, the Fédération Internationale de l'Automobile (FIA).

Lurani was instrumental in designing the regulations for the Italian 1937 Turismo Nazionale championship, whereby production vehicles approved by the CSAI were raced with the original chassis and engine layout as specified in the factory catalog and available for customers to buy; engines could be tuned and bored out, but the bodywork had to conform to regulations. The CSAI were concerned that FIA (known as AIACR at the time) 'Annexe C' Sports cars were becoming little more than thinly-disguised two-seat Grand Prix racers, far removed from the cars ordinary motorists could purchase from the manufacturers' catalogs.

The CSAI was shut down by the Italian Fascist government under Mussolini at the end of 1937, and replaced with a new organization called FASI. The Italian Fascists, as in Nazi Germany, sought control of motor racing as an important vehicle for national prestige and propaganda. FASI replaced Turismo Nazionale with the less strictly regulated Sports Nazionale championship, which ran in 1938 and 1939.

Postwar, the CSAI was re-established and in 1947 Italian national championships were held for both Sports Internazionale (FIA Annexe C sports cars) and Sports Nazionale. Sports Nazionale was abolished in 1948, creating the opportunity for a new category in 1949.

=== 1949 Coppa Inter-Europa ===
The first race specifically for grand touring motor cars (at the time the regulations, designed by Johnny Lurani, were actually called "turismo veloce", or 'fast touring') was the 1949 Coppa Inter-Europa, held over three hours on 29 May, at the 6.3 kilometer Autodromo Nazionale di Monza (Italy). It was won by a limited production, V-12 engined, Ferrari 166 "inter", originally known as the "sport", with a coupé body by Carrozzeria Touring of Milan with the Superleggera system.

After this race, governing body CSAI officially introduced a new category, called Gran Turismo Internazionale, for 1950. The regulations were drawn up by Johnny Lurani and fellow Italian motor racing journalist and organiser Corrado Filippini, requiring for qualification the production of thirty models per year, thereby ruling out, for the time being, Ferrari's hand-built berlinettas. Nonetheless, Ferrari 166 (including the upgraded MM - Mille Miglia - version) were produced and raced in sports car categories as both open barchettas and closed berlinettas, including winning the 1950 Mille Miglia outright.

=== 1950 Mille Miglia ===
On the third weekend of April 1950, it was the occasion of the annual Mille Miglia, one-thousand miles from Brescia to Rome and back over closed public roads, to include a Gran Turismo Internazionale category for the first time: twenty-four GT cars were entered, including Alfa Romeo 6C 2500 SS coupé touring, Cisitalia 202B berlinetta and Fiat 1100 S coupé. The field was rounded out by a solitary Fiat-based Siata Daina. Alfa Romeo took first place in the Gran Turismo Internazionale category (a creditable tenth overall) and also second place in category, followed by three Cisitalias. The overall race winning Ferrari 195 S was also a gran turismo-style coupé, but in the over 2,000 sports car class—in fact a special 166MM/195S Berlinetta Le Mans, chassis No. 0026MM, famously driven by Giannino Marzotto in a double-breasted suit, "a fitting advertisement for his family's textile business".

=== 1950 Coppa Inter-Europa ===
The 1950 Coppa Inter-Europa at Monza was held in March. Separate races were held for sports cars, and for gran turismo cars in four classes: 750, 1100, 1500, and over 1500.

Ferrari entered, and won, the Sports car 2000 class with a Ferrari 166 MM berlinetta, while an Alfa Romeo Sperimentale (over 2000 class) won the sports car race overall.

The gran turismo race was contested by Lancia Aprilia, Cisitalia 202B, Stanguellini GT 1100, Fiat 500, Alfa Romeo 2500 and Fiat Zagato. The overall winner was WWII fighter ace Franco Bordoni's Maserati A6 1500.

=== 1950 Targa Florio ===
The annual Targa Florio in Sicily was held the first weekend of April, and featured a Gran Turismo Internazionale category for the first time, in two classes: 1500 and over 1500. Contested by Lancia Aprilia, Cisitalia 202, Fiat 1100, Maserati A6, and even a solitary British Bristol 400 (based on the successful pre-war BMW 328), the Gran Turismo Internazionale category was won by Argentinian driver, Adolfo Schwelm Cruz, in an Alfa Romeo 6C 2500 SS.

Schwelm Cruz and Alfa Romeo repeated their success in the 1950 Targa Florio and Mille Miglia by winning the gran turismo category at the Coppa della Toscana in June. An Alfa Romeo 6C 2500, driven by Salvatore Amendola, was also victorious in the gran turismo category of the Coppa d' Oro delle Dolomiti in July, run through the Dolomite Mountains, starting and finishing in the town of Cortina d'Ampezzo. An Alfa Romeo 6C 2500 took the gran turismo honours again at the Giro delle Calabria in August. The Alfa Romeo 6C 2500 was based on a pre-war design, and is considered by some to be the last of the classic Alfa Romeos.

=== 1951 Campionato Gran Turismo Internazionale ===
For 1951, the CSAI organised an Italian national championship for the Gran Turismo Internazionale category in four classes: 750, 1,500, 2,000, and over 2,000 cc. Interest was attracted from manufacturers such as Alfa Romeo, Lancia, Maserati, Ferrari, Fiat and SIATA. The championship was held over ten events, including all the classic long-distance road races (the Giro di Sicilia, the Mille Miglia, the Coppa della Toscana, the Giro dell'Umbria, the Coppa d' Oro delle Dolomiti, the Giro delle Calabrie and the Stella Alpina) as well as three circuit races (the Coppa Inter-Europa at Monza, the Circuito di Caracalla night-race in Rome, and the 6 Ore di Pescara).

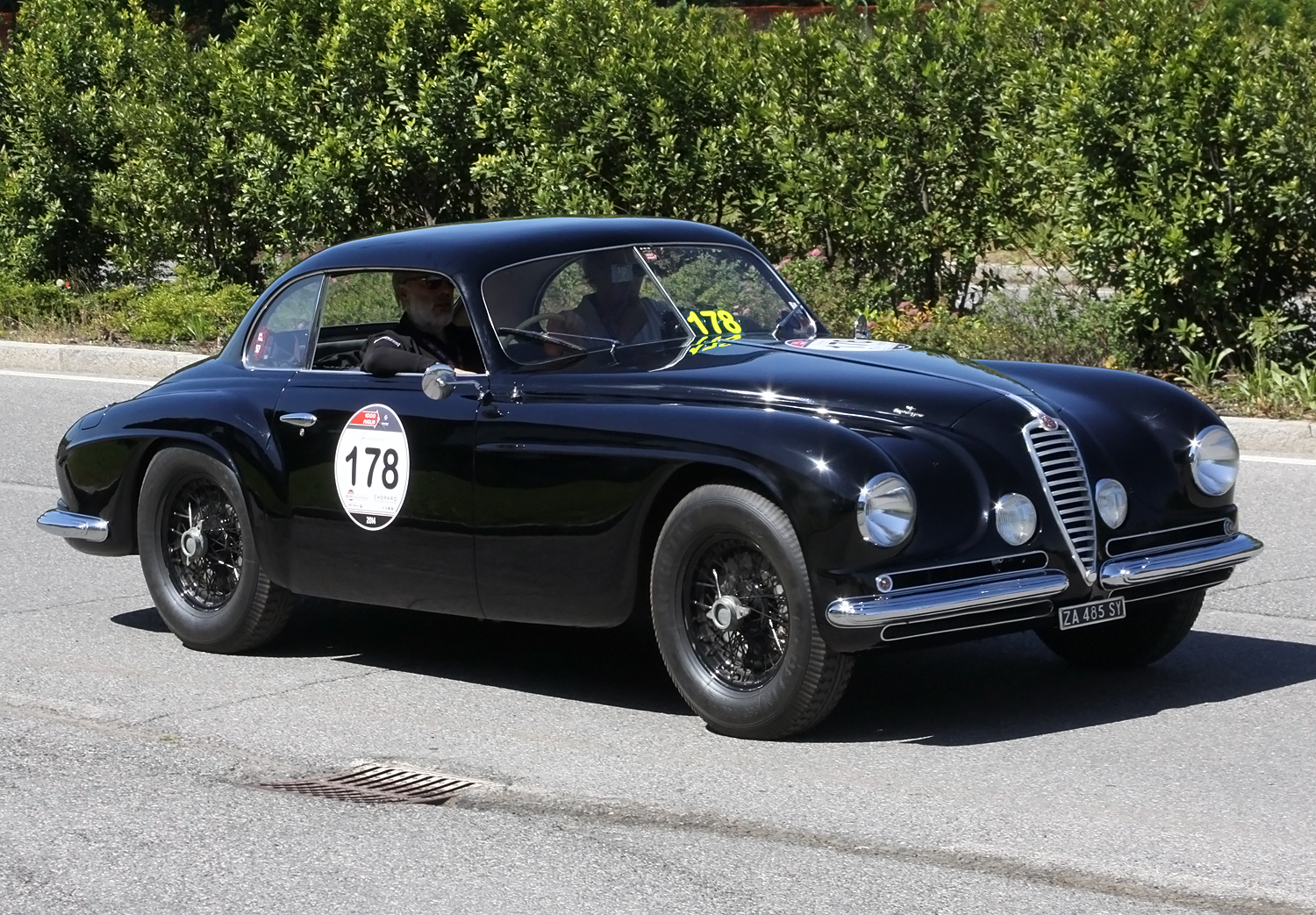
Alfa Romeo 6C 2500 SS Villa d'Este 1949

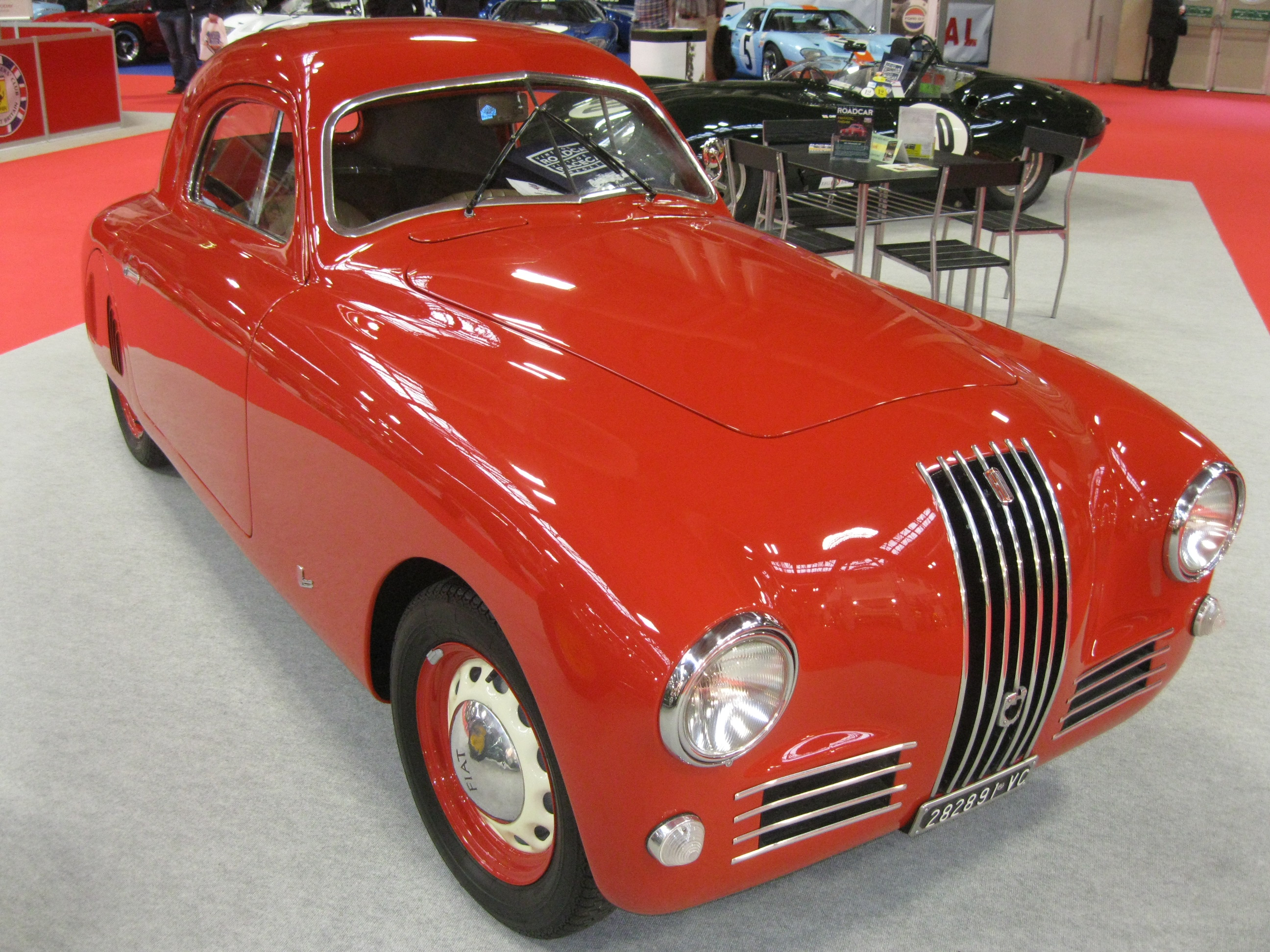
Fiat 1100 S coupé 1949

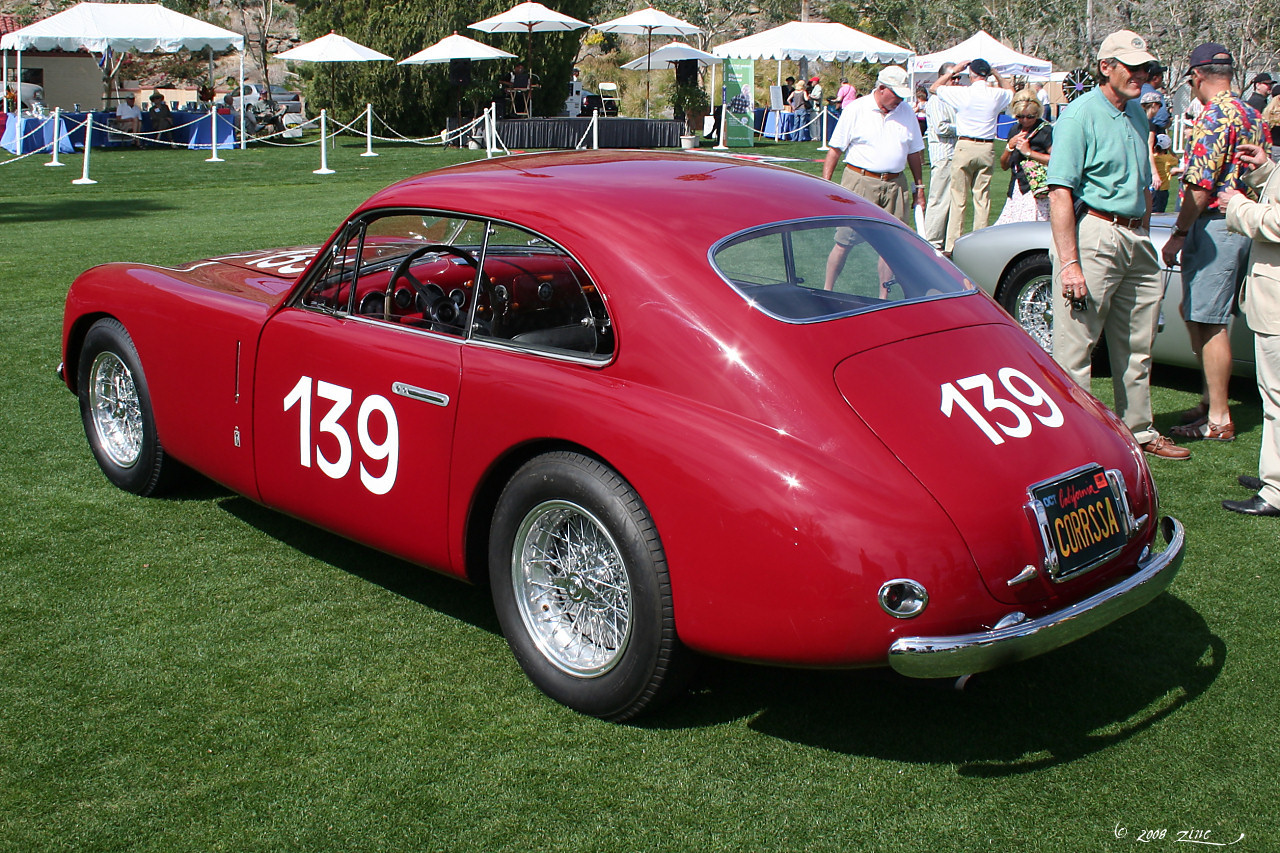
Maserati A6 1500 Pinin Farina competition berlinetta 1949

=== 1954 FIA Appendix J ===
Prior to 1954, internationally agreed motor-sport regulations existed only for racing cars and sports cars (FIA Appendix C). After a testy initial period, the FIA introduced for the 1954 motor racing calendar new "Appendix J" regulations covering production touring cars, tuned special touring cars, gran turismo cars, and production sports cars. This was the first officially sanctioned international recognition of the gran turismo category.

The 1954 gran turismo regulations stipulated cars for personal transport with closed bodywork built by the manufacturer of the chassis, although open bodies and special coachwork were admissible if listed in the official catalog of the manufacturer of the chassis and if the weight of the car was at least the same as the closed standard model. Minimum production was 100 cars during 12 months and cars needed to have only two seats.

Gran turismo categories (under 1500 and over 1500) were first included in the World Sportscar Championship in round three of the 1954 season at the 1954 Mille Miglia (the first placed GT car being the Lancia Aurelia B20 GT of Serafini and Mancini). GT entries would become a regular feature alongside their sports car brethren at international races from this time forward: GT cars raced in world championship rounds at the Targa Florio from 1955, Nürburgring from 1956, Sebring from 1957, 24 Hours of Le Mans from 1959, and Buenos Aires from 1960 (from which year every round of the world championship included GT cars). In 1960 and 1961 an FIA Coupé de Grand Tourisme (Grand Touring Cup) was awarded.

In 1962-1984 seasons (except of the 1982 season) World Sportscar Championship titles were awarded to manufacturers of GT cars alongside to manufacturers of Sports prototypes.

The FIA grand touring category came to be known as "Group 3", and is defined in the 1961 Appendix J (English) regulation as: "Vehicles built in small series for customers who are looking for better performance and/or maximum comfort and are not particularly concerned about economy. Such cars shall conform to a model defined in a catalog and be offered to the customers by the regular Sales Department of the manufacturer."

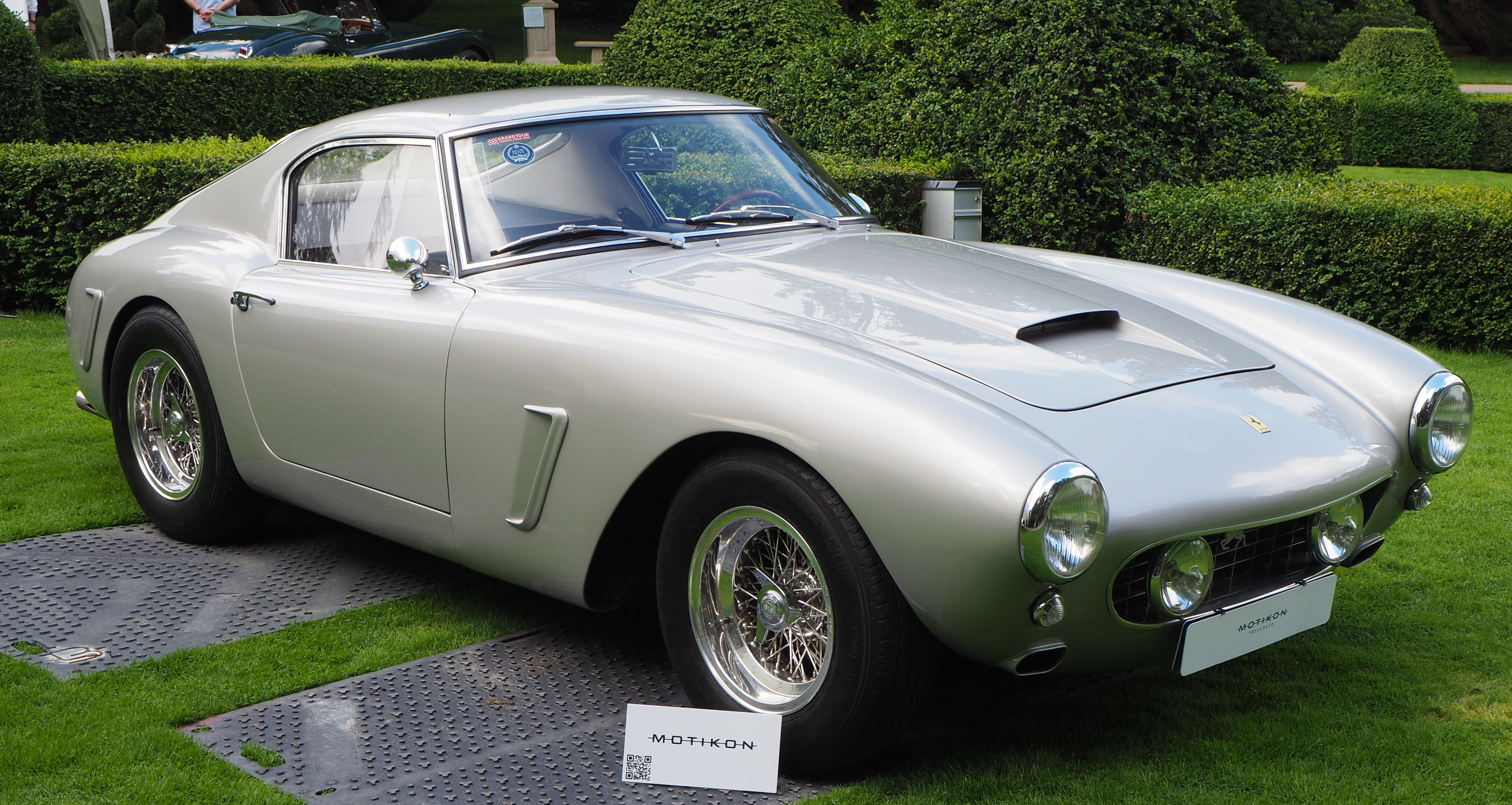
Ferrari 250 GT Berlinetta 1956 -1961

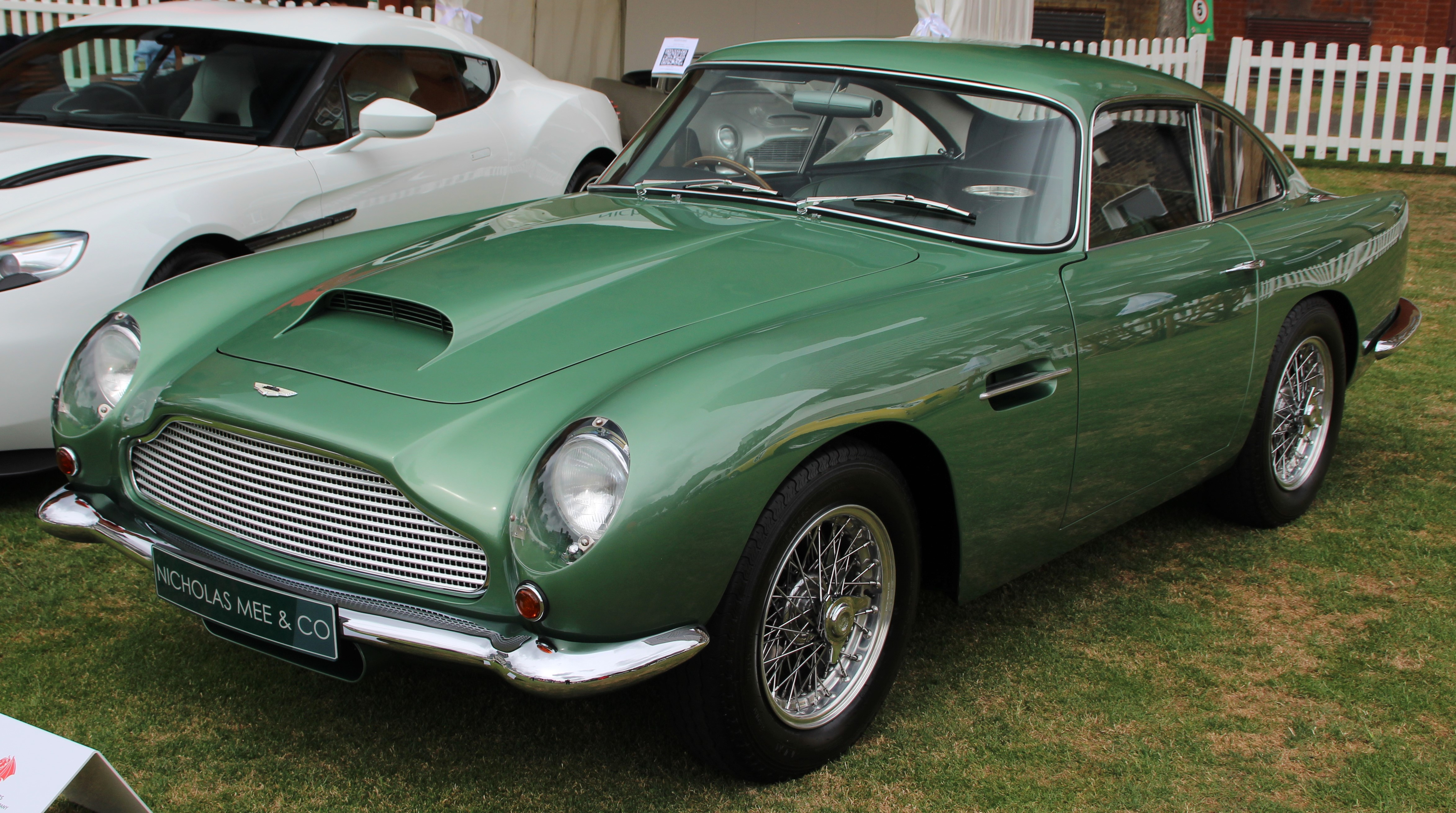
Aston Martin DB4 GT 1961

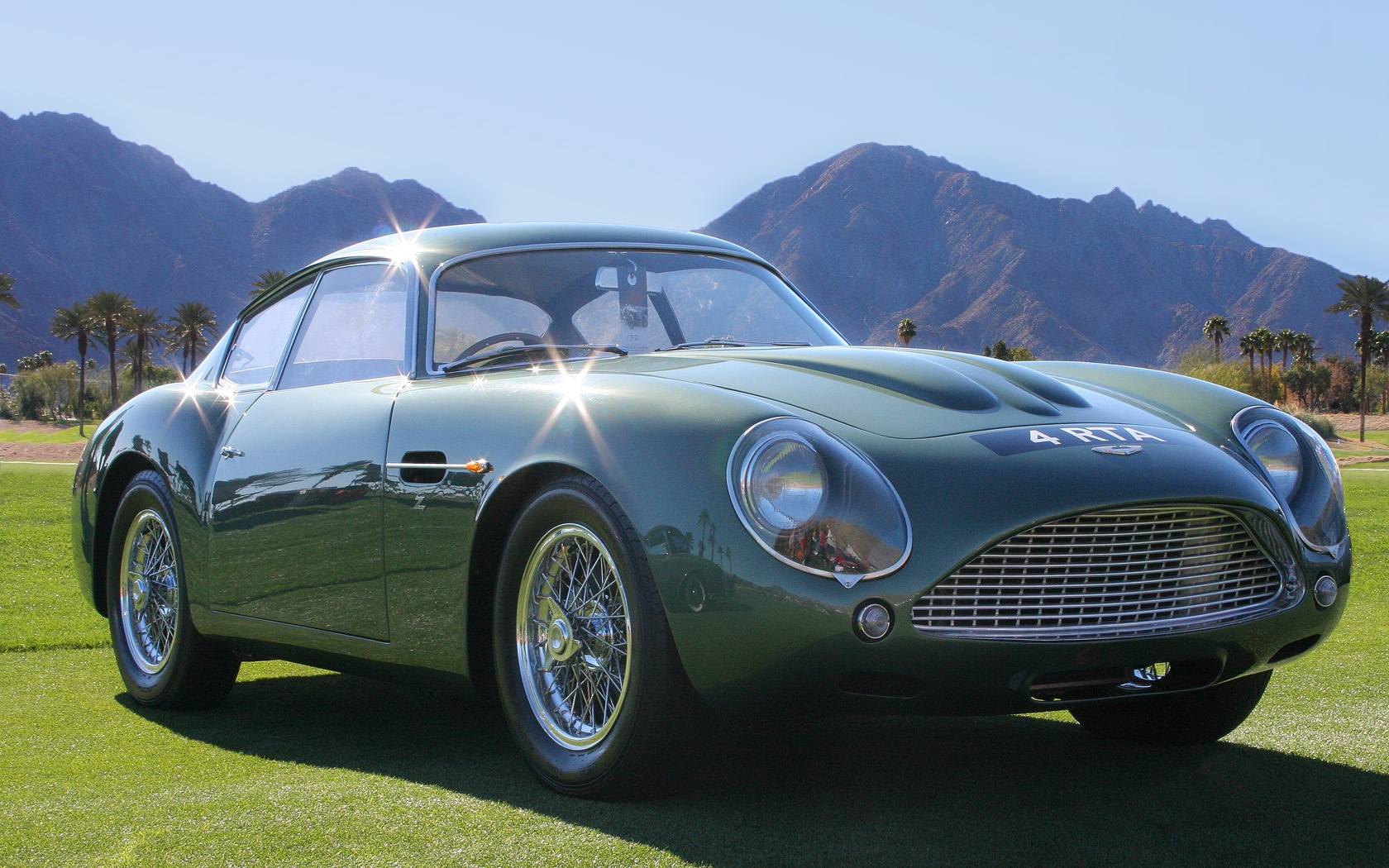
Aston Martin DB4 GT Zagato 1961

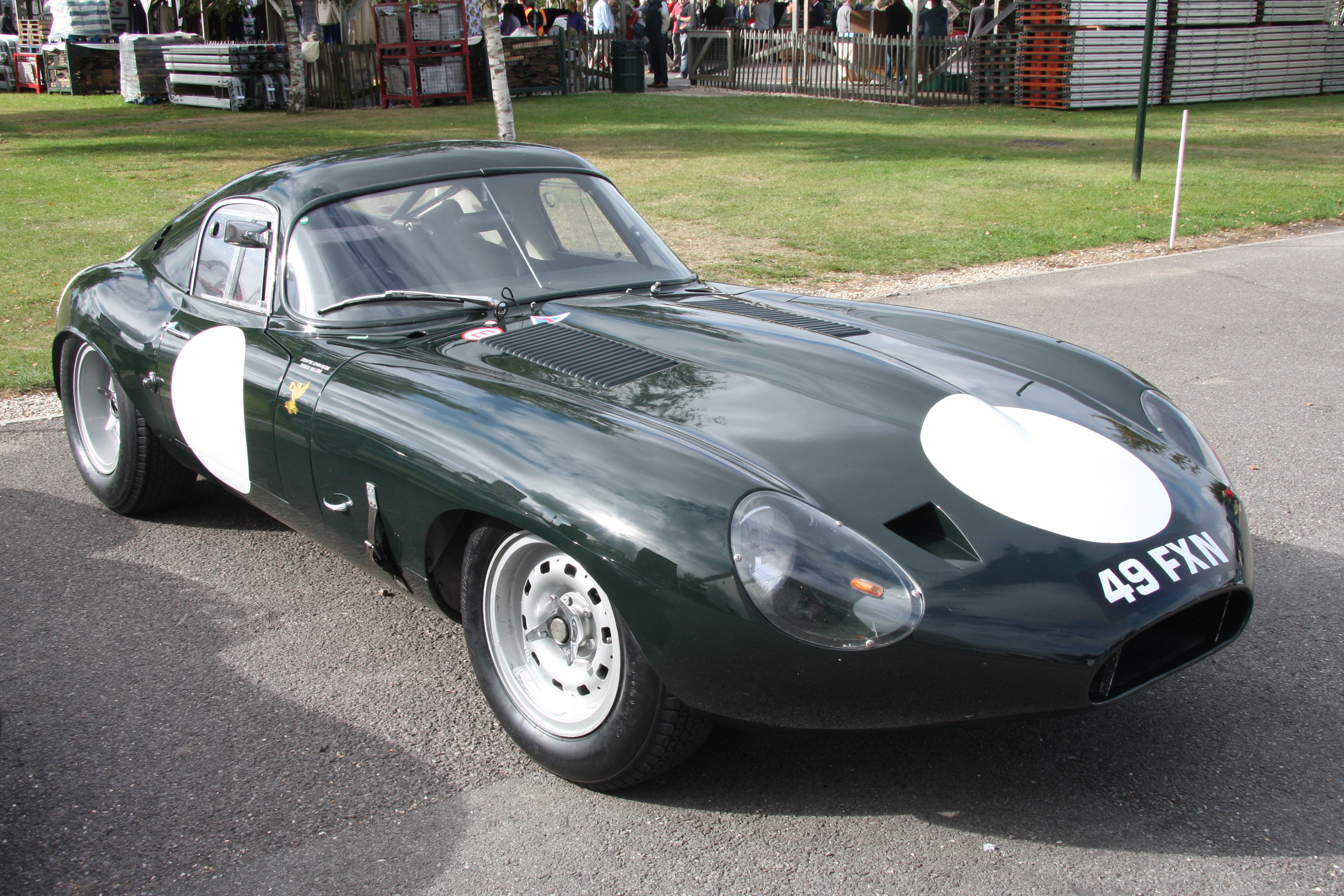
Jaguar E-type lightweight low -drag coupe 1962

=== 1962–1965 International Championship for GT Manufacturers ===
In 1962 the FIA, addressing concerns to reduce the speeds attained in sports car racing following the disastrous accident at Le Mans in 1955, shifted focus from Appendix C sports cars to production based GT cars of Appendix J. The previous World Sportscar Championship title was discontinued, being replaced by the International Championship for GT Manufacturers, won by the Ferrari 250 GTO in 1962, 1963 and 1964.

==== Cobra Ferrari wars ====
The period 1963–1965 is famous for the "Cobra Ferrari wars", a rivalry between American former-racing driver and Le Mans winner Carroll Shelby (Le Mans 1959, Aston Martin DBR1/300), and Enzo Ferrari, whose 250 GTs were the dominant grand touring cars of the time. Shelby retired from driving due to a heart condition, returning to California from Europe in 1959 with the idea to marry the AC Ace sports car chassis with Ford's V-8 small-block engine: the resulting Shelby AC Cobra was a sales success.

Shelby, like Enzo Ferrari, sold road cars to support his racing team, and like Ferrari the Cobra was a success on the track, at least on the short circuits common in the United States. On the longer tracks prevalent in Europe however, the Cobra's crude aerodynamics could not compete with the sleek 180 mph Ferrari 250 GTOs: even fitted with a removable roof the Cobra's top speed was 150 mph. At the 1963 24 Hours of Le Mans, a Cobra placed seventh; Ferraris placed first to sixth. Shelby team engineer Pete Brock hand-designed a Kamm-backed aerodynamic body for the Cobra, creating the Shelby Daytona coupe, and a showdown with Ferrari was set.

In testing, the Shelby Daytona coupe attained a top speed of 196 mph, and went on to win the GT class at the 1964 24 Hours of Le Mans. Shelby had beaten Ferrari on the biggest stage; however, the fast and reliable Ferrari 250 GTOs were again victorious in the 1964 International Championship for GT Manufacturers. The championship was controversial: Enzo Ferrari, with only a narrow points lead over Shelby, attempted to have the radical new mid-engined Ferrari LM250 homologated for the final championship round at Monza in Italy. When the FIA turned Ferrari down, Ferrari withdrew. The race organisers Auto Club d'Italia, fearing a financial disaster from the withdrawal of the famous Italian team, canceled the event, and Ferrari was crowned world champion. In the aftermath, Ferrari declared he would never race GTs again, and for 1965 the rivalry with Ferrari was taken up by Ford Motor Company and the Ford GT40, also mid-engined, in the sports car divisions.

In 1965, with Shelby's race team now dedicated to the GT40, the Daytona coupes were entrusted to Alan Mann Racing in the United Kingdom, and easily won the GT world championship. From 1966, the FIA returned its world championship focus to the sports car division, but GT entries remained an important feature of international sports car racing.

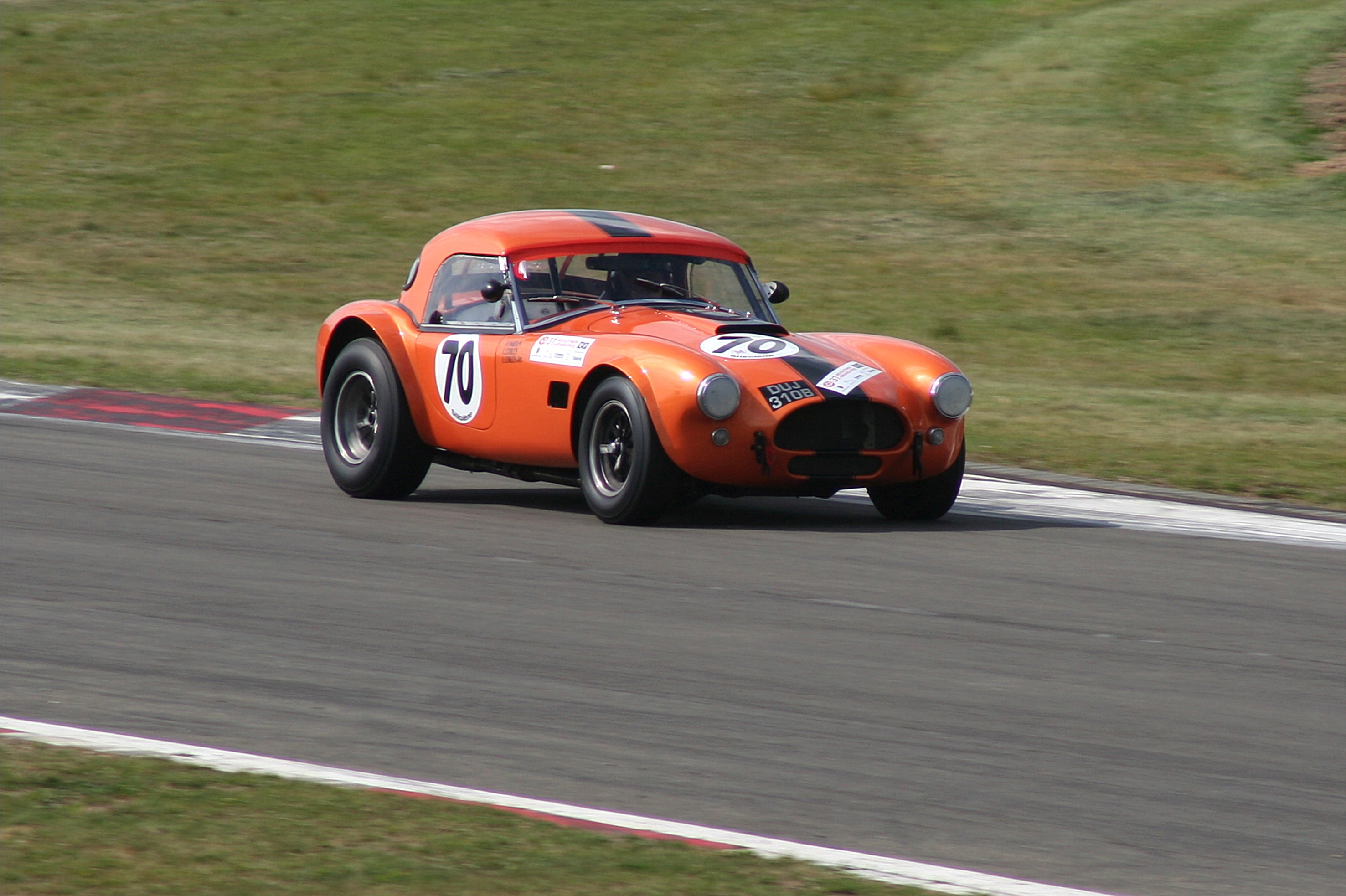
Shelby AC Cobra hardtop 1964

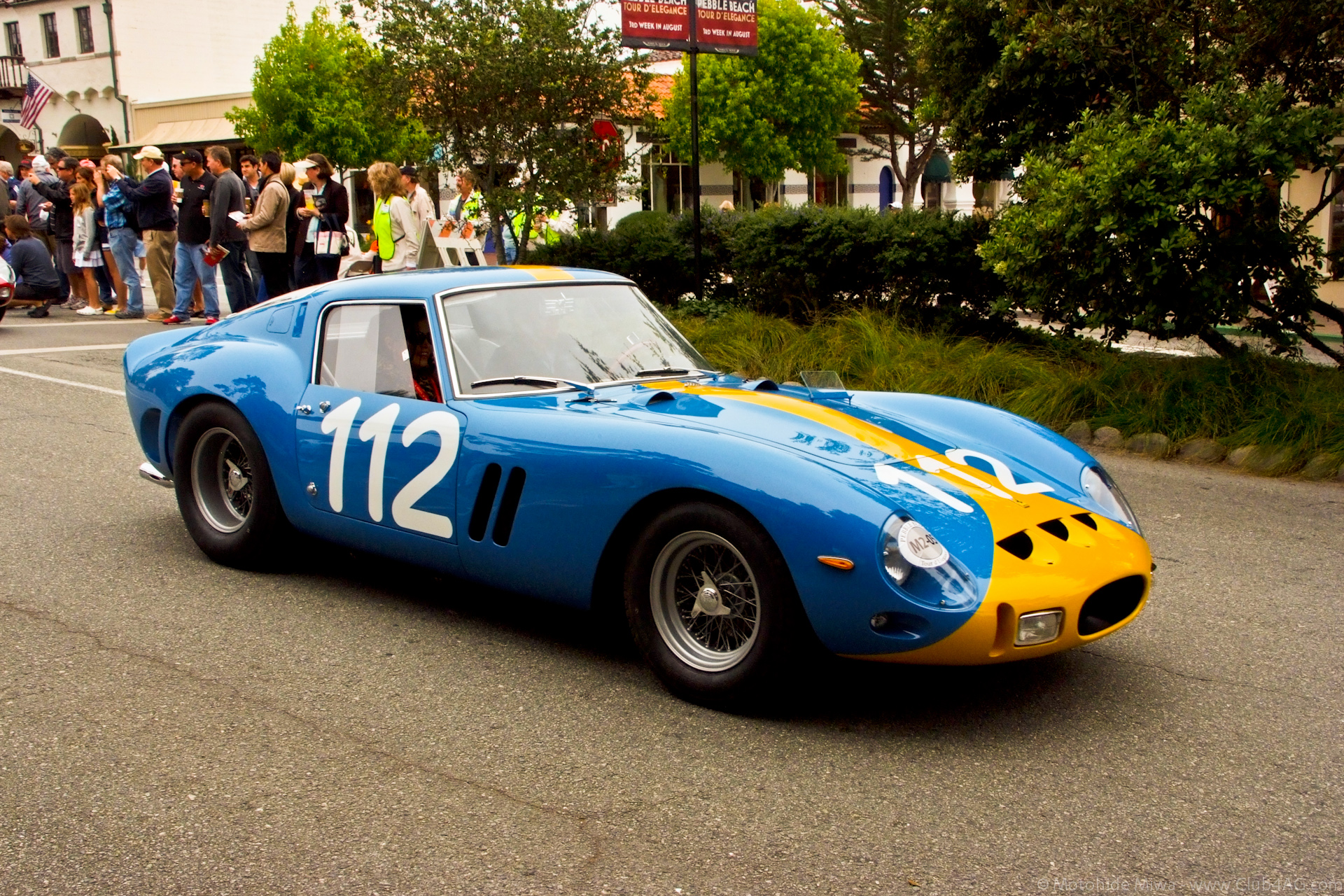
Ferrari 250 GTO 1964

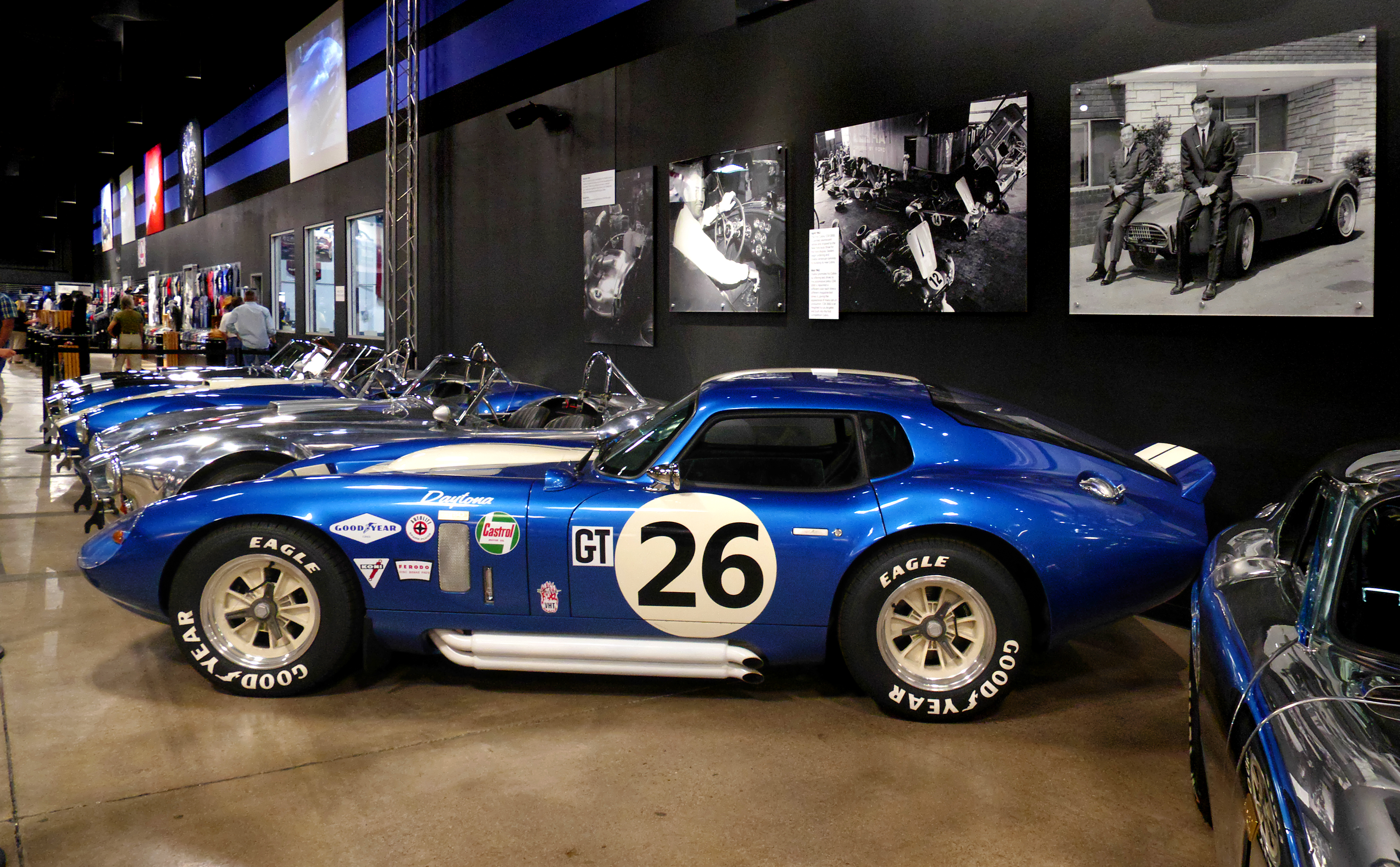
Shelby Daytona coupe 1964

== British grand tourers 1946–1963 ==
While Italy was the home of the gran turismo, of all the other European nations that took the concept up, it was Britain that was most enthusiastic.

=== 1946 Healey Elliot ===
Before Donald Healey turned to production of the small, light and inexpensive Austin-Healey 100 sports car in 1952, he had brought to market a fast and aerodynamic 2 1/2-litre Riley-powered Healey Elliot closed saloon (named for the coach-builder). Claimed to be the fastest closed car of its day, only 101 were made before production was given over to the successful new sports car.

=== 1947 Bristol 400–406 ===
Immediately following the Second World War, H. J. Aldington, pre-war Frazer Nash manufacturer and BMW importer, sought out BMW's badly bombed Munich factory and there discovered the special-bodied open BMW 328, duly returning with it to Britain with a view to building Fraser Nash-BMWs with the aid of key former-BMW personnel. The Bristol Aeroplane Company, looking to enter the car sector, acquired a majority shareholding. There were government concerns about using German engineers, and in the end, only Fritz Fiedler was involved as consultant to Bristol's own engineers. By the time the new car debuted at the 1947 Geneva Motor Show, it was known simply as the Bristol 400.

The Bristol 400 was essentially a hand-built, to aircraft industry standards, BMW 327 two-door coupe, mounted on a BMW 326 chassis, powered by the legendary 2-litre BMW 328 engine. It was fast, 90 mph, but expensive. The 1948 401 featured an improved aerodynamic body in the lightweight Touring Superleggera fashion; and the 1953 403 boasted improved suspension, brakes, and gearbox, while power was boosted from 85 to 100 bhp. The 1954 short-chassis 404 had a completely new body, and top speed was up to 110 mph. The 1958 406 was the last of the BMW-powered versions and was produced until 1961, after which they were superseded by a range of automatic transmission equipped and Chrysler V8 powered Bristols, with the engines rebuilt by Bristol engineers and fitted with high-lift camshafts and mechanical lifters.

=== 1953 Aston Martin DB2 ===
David Brown purchased the Aston Martin concern in 1947, and the company was effectively reborn for the post-war era. Unlike the Bristol, the Aston Martin DB2 which debuted at the 1949 Motor Show (as a prototype Le Mans racer) was an all-British affair. The 2.6 litre twin overhead camshaft Lagonda engine was designed by W. O. Bentley (Brown having also purchased the Lagonda company). Brown decided on a closed coupé body in the latest Italian tradition, rather than the traditional Aston Martin open two-seater sports car. The 1950 production DB2 was a styling triumph for designer Frank Feeley, and Brown later recalled that many believed the car styled in Italy. The 105 bhp DB2 was a genuine 110 mph grand tourer; in 1951 came the more powerful optional 125 bhp "Vantage" version. In its original form, the DB2 was a two-seater; the 1953 DB2/4 added a 2+2 and hatchback arrangement and a 3-litre engine in 1954. A Mark II version with Tickford coachwork appeared in 1955 (Brown had purchased this company too). The Mark III version from 1957 to 1959 developed 162 bhp, and was available with 180 and 195 bhp high-output engine options.

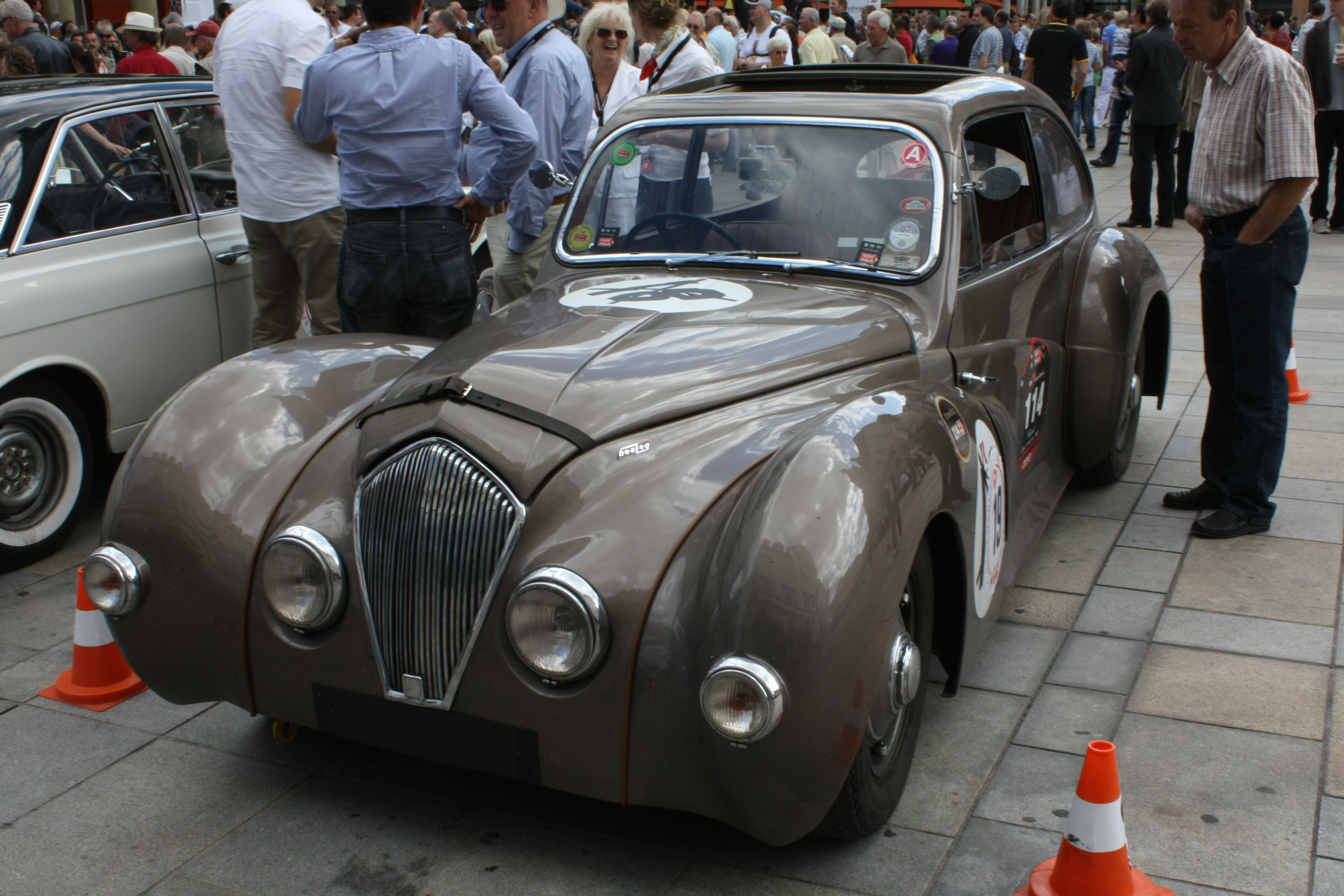
1946–1950 Healey Elliott

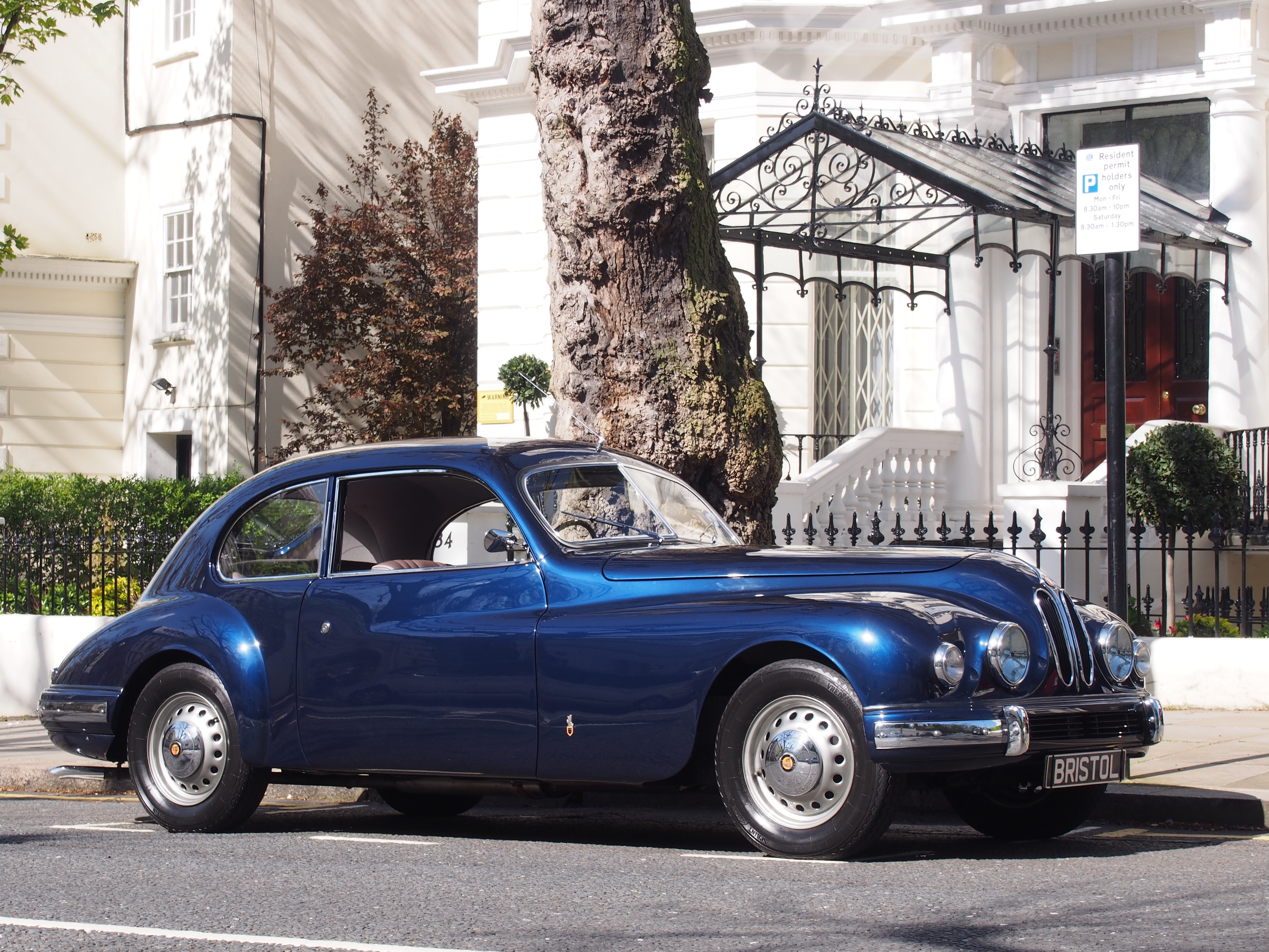
1948–1953 Bristol 401

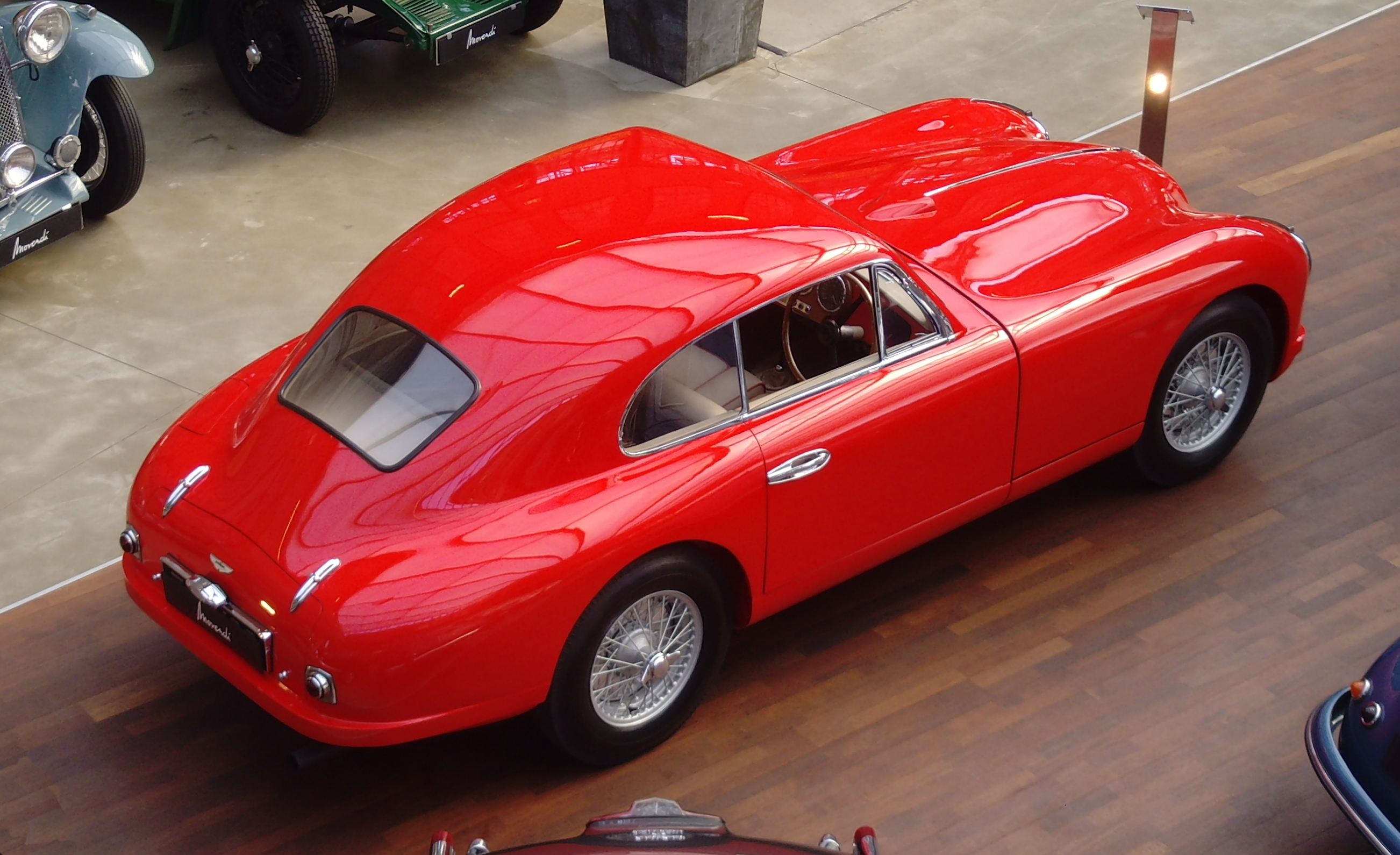
1950-1953 Aston Martin DB2

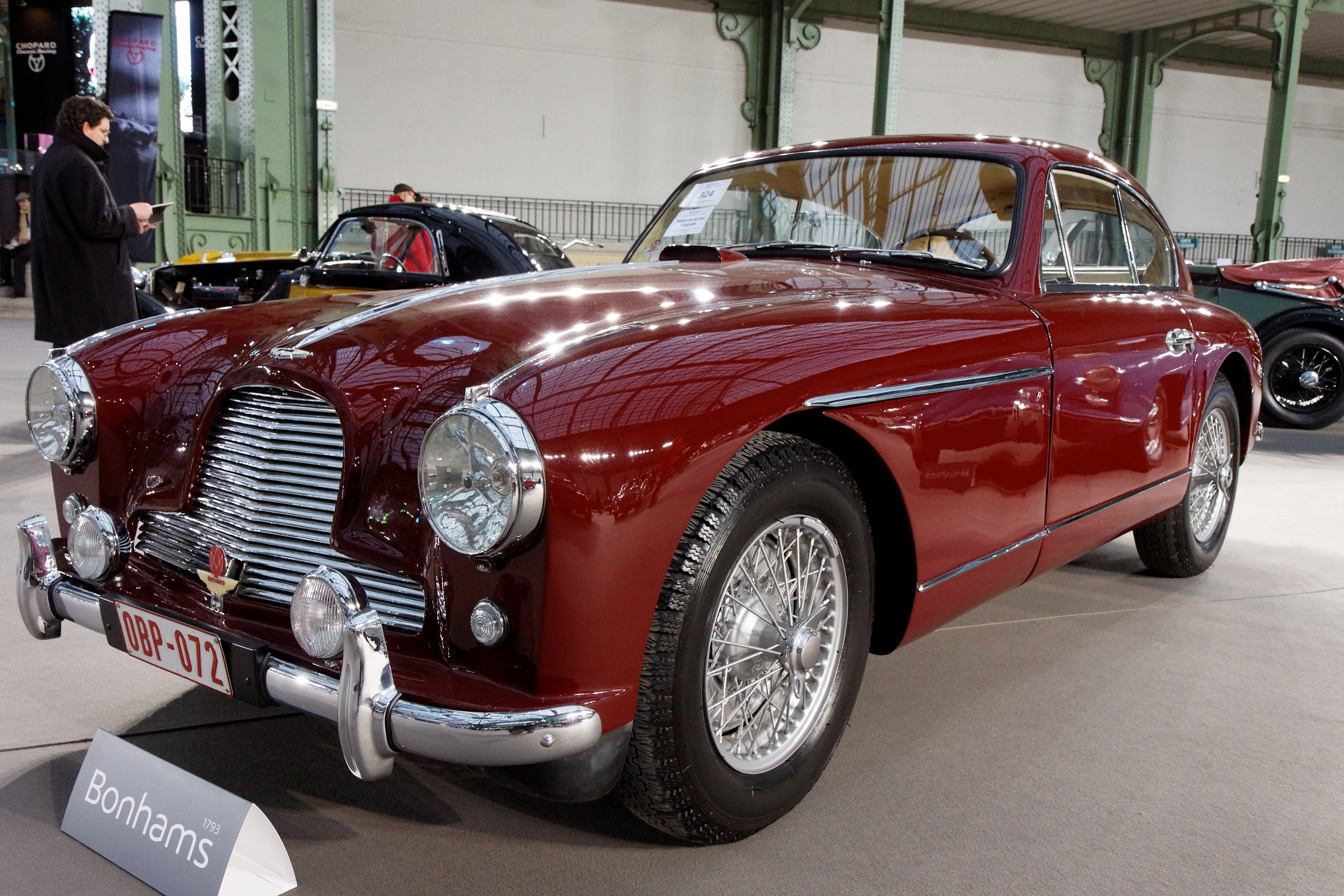
1953–1957 Aston Martin DB2/4

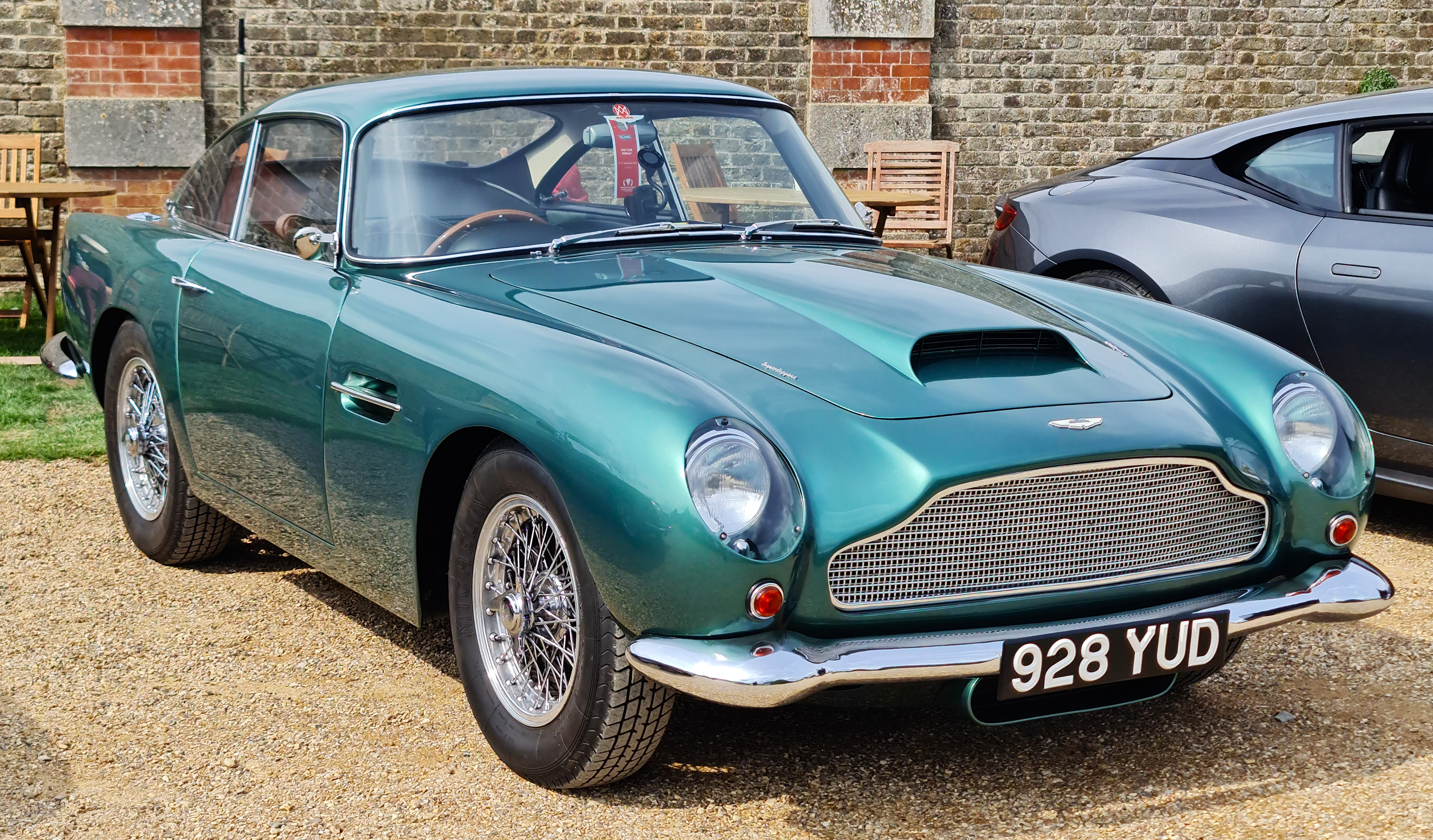
1958–1963 Aston Martin DB4

== See also ==
- Cruiser and touring motorcycle for the motorcycle equivalents
- Endurance racing
