= 208 (disambiguation) =

208 was a year.

208 may also refer to:

- 208 (number)
- 208 BC, a year
- 208 Lacrimosa, an asteroid
- Ferrari 208 (disambiguation), the name of two cars
- Peugeot 208, a French car
- Siata 208s, an Italian car
- Siata 208 CS, an Italian car
- UFC 208, a mixed martial arts event

== See also ==
- 208th (disambiguation)
