= Siata =

Italian automobile manufacturer, 1926–1970

SIATA
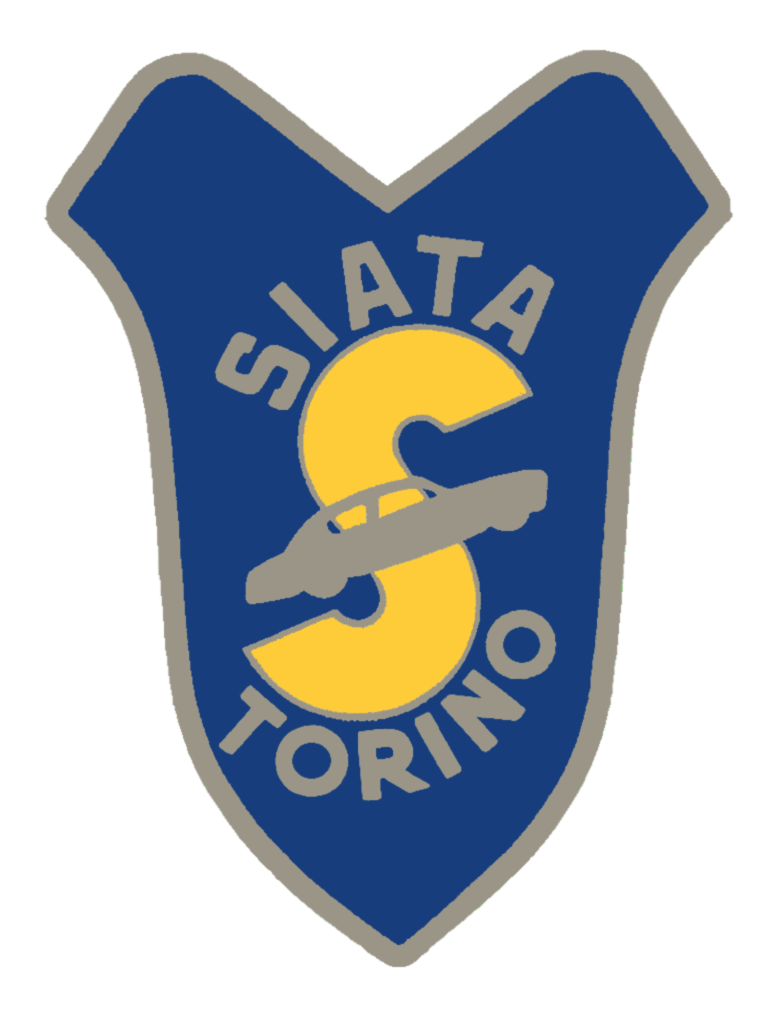
- Industry: Automotive
- Founded: 1926
- Founder: Giorgio Ambrosini
- Defunct: 1970
- Fate: Bankruptcy
- Headquarters: Turin, Italy
- Products: Automobiles

Siata (Società Italiana Auto Trasformazioni Accessori in English Italian Car Transformation Accessories Company) was an Italian car tuning shop and manufacturer founded in 1926 by amateur race car driver Giorgio Ambrosini.

Siata initially sold performance parts to modify and tune cars manufactured by Fiat. After World War II, the company began making its own sports cars under the Siata brand until its eventual bankruptcy following the first Arab oil embargo in the mid-1970s.

== History ==
=== First production models: 1948-1952 ===
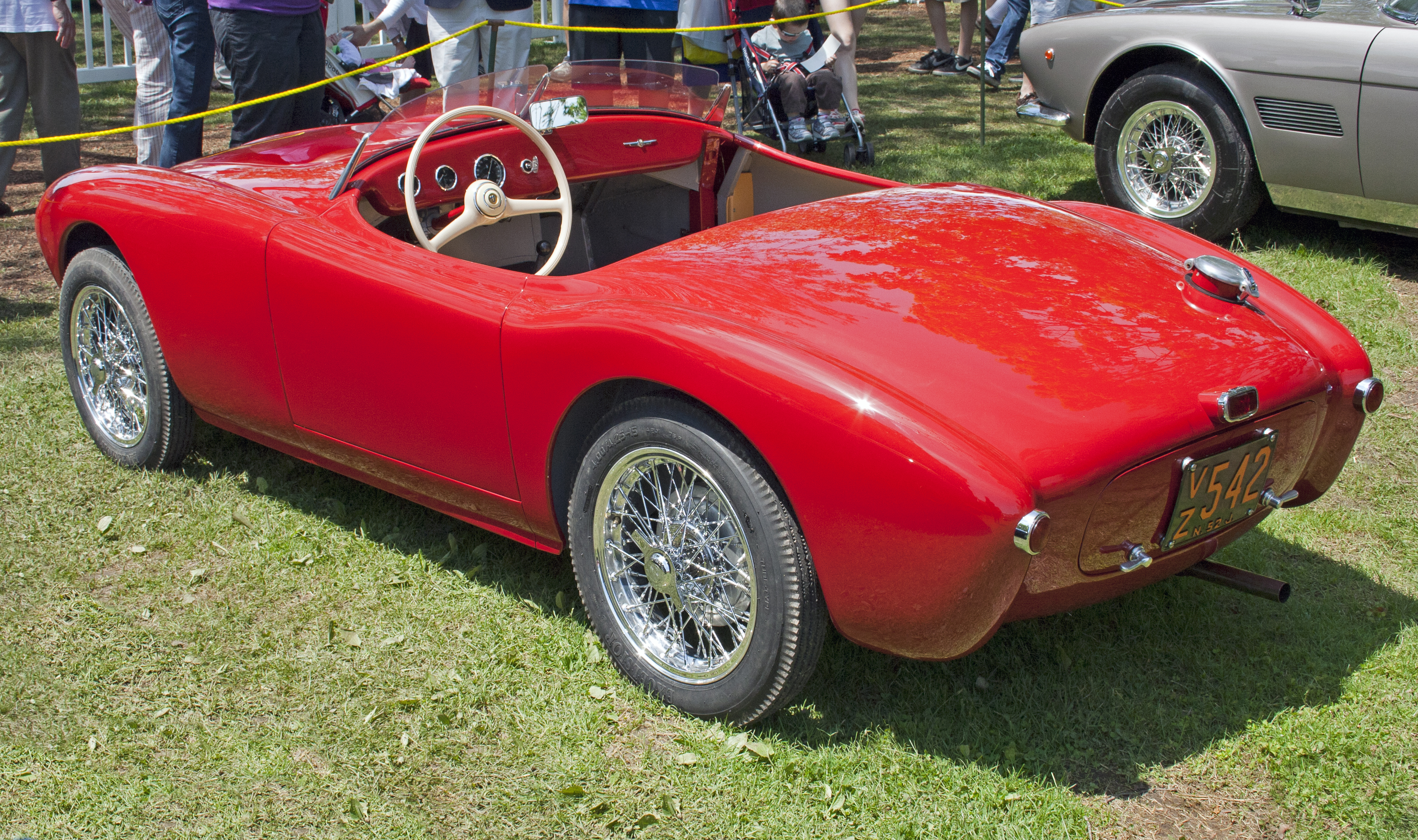
1952 Siata 300BC Barchetta Sport Spider

Production of the Siata's first wholly original design the Siata Amica began in 1948 and continued through 1952. The Amica was powered by a Fiat 500 cc engine capable of producing 22 horsepower with an optional 750 cc unit producing 25 horsepower. The Amica was available in both two-seater convertible/spider and coupé configurations.

A specially modified Amica known as the Fiat Siata 500 Pescara won the 1948 Italian Road Racing Championship fitted with a five-speed manual gearbox and a modified 500 cc engine producing 40 horsepower. Only two 500 Pescaras were ever built with only one surviving model. The surviving car also competed in the 1991 Historic Millie Miglia.

=== Daina and 300BC ===
The Daina was based on heavily modified Fiat 1400 mechanics; the frame was reinforced and shortened while the engine was tuned by Siata. The Daina could be had with a 1.4L (1,395 cc), 1.5L (1,500 cc) or 1.8L (1,817 cc) overhead valve I4 engine, all of which were sourced from Fiat. From 1950 to 1958 there were approximately 50 Daina Series cars produced. However, only a few of the Series were produced after 1953. About 20 Daina Sport (coupes) are thought to have been built, only six are known to exist today. A cabriolet version called the Gran Sport comprised most of the Daina Series cars. The Gran Sport had a steel body with an aluminum hood designed by Stabilimenti Farina (3 all-aluminum-bodied Gran Sports were made as well) but when they closed in 1953, Bertone took over production with a coupe model of their own design called the "Sport".

Following the Amica, Siata introduced the 300BC Barchetta Sport Spider in 1951. The Barchetta Sport Spider was designed by Mario Revelli de Beaumont and built by Bertone and Rocco Motto. Around 50 production models were created and predominantly featured either a 750 cc Crosley or 1100 cc Fiat engine. During this time Siata also created the Cucciolo ("puppy") motor sold in kit form by Ducati and later used to power Ducati's first complete mopeds and motorcycles starting in 1952.

=== 8V Fiat engine and the 208: 1952-1955 ===
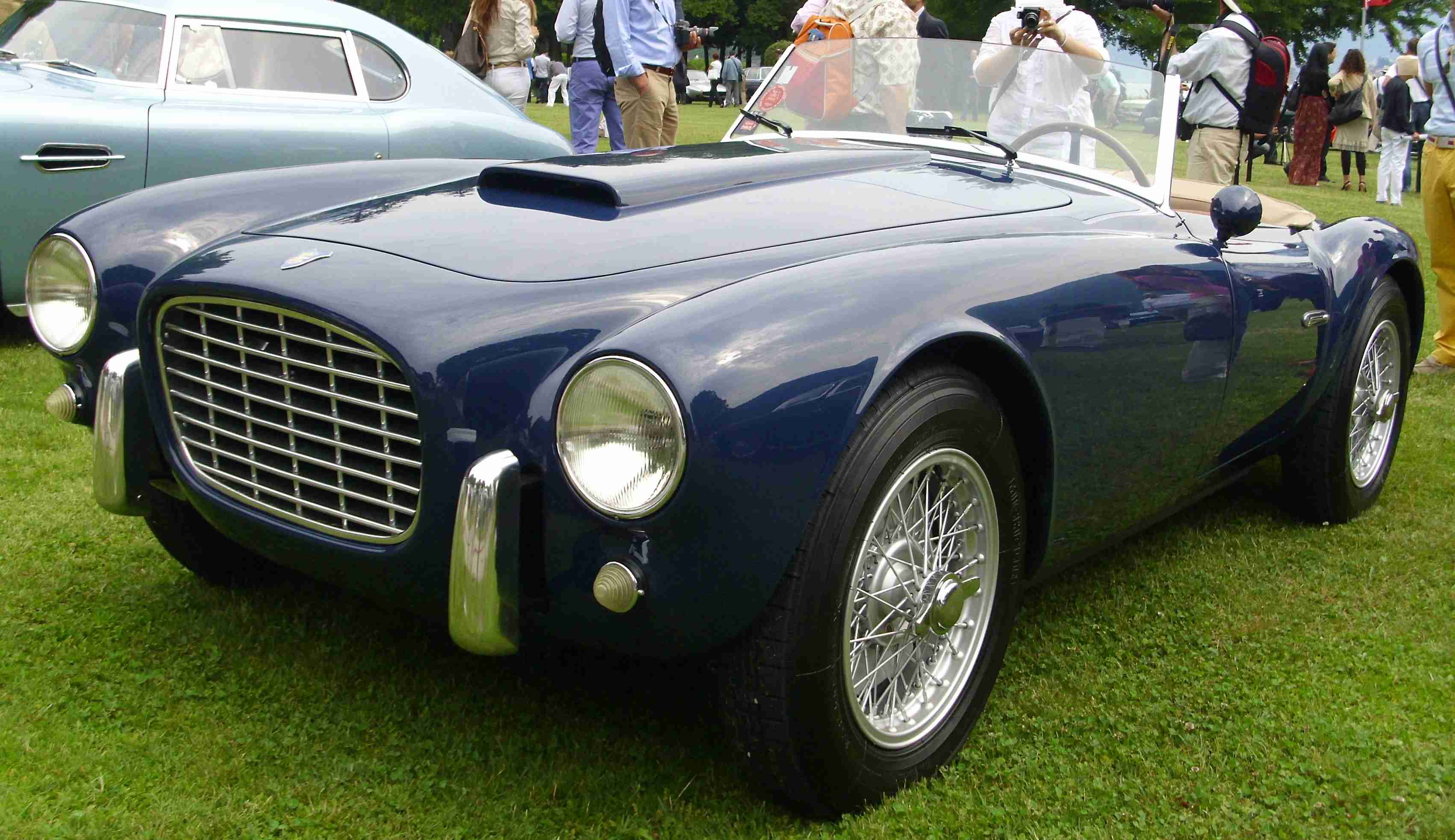
1953 Siata 208S

Siata introduced the coupé Siata 208 CS and convertible 208S in 1952, both featuring Fiat's 2.0 liter 8V engine. 18 of the 208 CS were built from 1952 to 1954. 35 convertibles were produced between 1953 and 1955, priced at 5300 dollars and available in both convertible and hard top. The 208S rose to prominence after actor and race car driver Steve McQueen purchased model BS523 from Los Angeles-based Siata importer Ernie McAfee in the mid-1950s. McQueen reportedly re badged the car with Ferrari emblems and dubbed the car his "Little Ferrari".

=== Fiat derived models and Abarth partnership: 1954-1968 ===
In 1954, the Mitzi was presented, a small car with a 434 cm³ twin-cylinder rear-mounted side-valve engine that remained in the prototype stage. In the second half of the 1950s, SIATA concentrated on models derived from the Fiat 600 and 1100. In 1959, under the new company name SIATA Auto, 49% of the company's capital was acquired by Abarth. Abarth planned for SIATA to build road cars and racing cars with Fiat mechanicals. The first fruit of the SIATA-Abarth agreement was the 750 (available in coupé and spyder versions) presented at the 1959 Turin Motor Show; on the same occasion a lengthened Fiat 600 Multipla and a 600 saloon with two-tone bodywork were also presented. The agreement between the two Turin companies did not last long, dissolving in 1960. Additionally, in 1960, a Spanish subsidiary of Siata was formed in Barcelona with a focus on producing models of their own design based on the SEAT 600. In the 1960s, SIATA introduced the TS coupés, designed by Giovanni Michelotti and derived from the Fiat 1300 and 1500, offered with a choice of 1300, 1500, or 1600 cc engines.

=== End of Siata: 1968-1970 ===
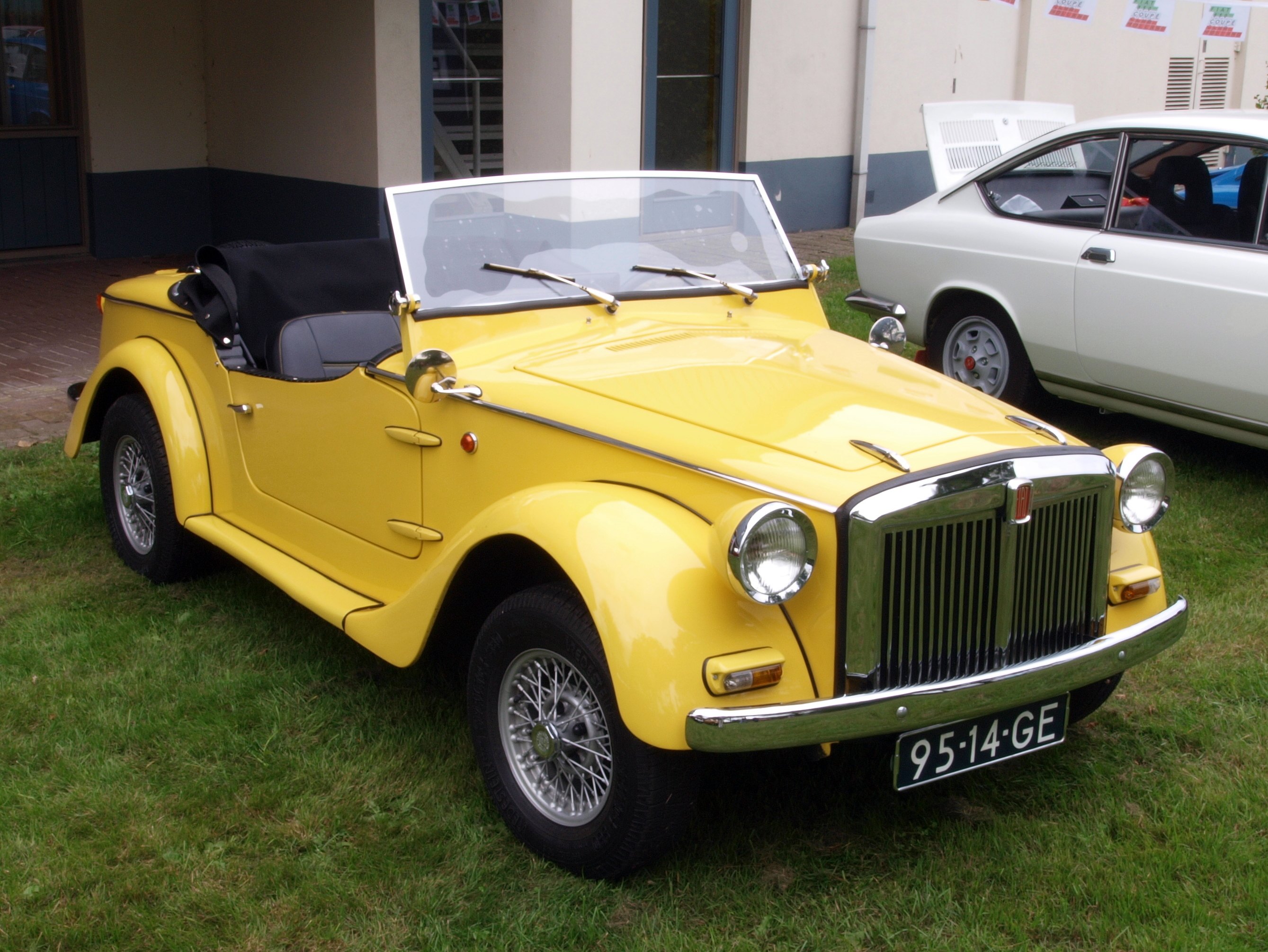
1968 Siata Spring

In 1968, after a detailed market research among Italian youth, Siata launched the Siata Spring, based on parts from Fiat 850, with a front end styled by Enrico Fumia in 1966. The Siata Spring was produced until 1970, with a total of around 3500 cars built, when Siata went bankrupt, but the assembly line was purchased by a newly formed company called ORSA (Officina Realizzazioni Sarde Automobili). They moved it to an assembly plant near Cagliari, where it resumed the production of the Spring, which was now based on the SEAT 850 Especial. Because of this the engine displacement increased to 903 cc with 47 hp (35 kW), and it gained disc brakes on the front wheels and a higher top speed of 125 km/h (78 mph). Due to the 1973 oil crisis, sales of sports cars in Italy declined, forcing ORSA to end the production in spring 1975.

== Models ==
Siata

- Siata Amica (1948–1952)
- Siata Amica 600 (195?–1958)
- Siata Daina (1950–1958)
- Siata 300BC Barchetta (1951–1956)
- Siata 208 CS (1952–1954)
- Siata 208S (1953–1954, 56 produced)
- Siata-Abarth 750 (1959–1961)
- Siata 1300 TS
- Siata 1500 TS
- Siata 1600 TS
- Siata Spring (1968–1970)

== Racing ==
Siata raced in the Mille Miglia and the Italian Road Racing Championship in 1948, 1949, 1950, 1951, 1952 and 1955. A 1500-cc Siata Daina driven by Dick Irish and Bob Fergus finished first in its class and third overall at the 1952 12 Hours of Sebring.

== Siata Española ==
Siata Española, S.A. was the Spanish subsidiary of Siata, created in Barcelona and with a factory in Tarragona. Between 1960 and 1973 it focused on producing special bodies, mostly of its own design, for SEAT chassis’, mainly the SEAT 600, as well as in engine conversions and car accessories.
Models

- Siata Ampurias (1960–1961)
- Siata Turisa (1960–1962)
- Siata Formichetta (1960–1968)
- Siata Tarraco (1960–1971)
- Siata Minivan (1967–1980)
- Siata Patricia (1969)
