= C208 =

C208 may refer to:

- Cessna 208 Caravan, a single-engine turboprop aircraft (ICAO type designator C208)
- Cargo Dragon C208, the first SpaceX second-generation reusable cargo spacecraft handling cargo flights to the International Space Station under contract from NASA after 2020
- Mercedes-Benz CLK-Class (C208), a car

== See also ==
- 208 (disambiguation)
- C (disambiguation)
