= Siata Daina =

Sports car manufactured by Italian automaker Siata

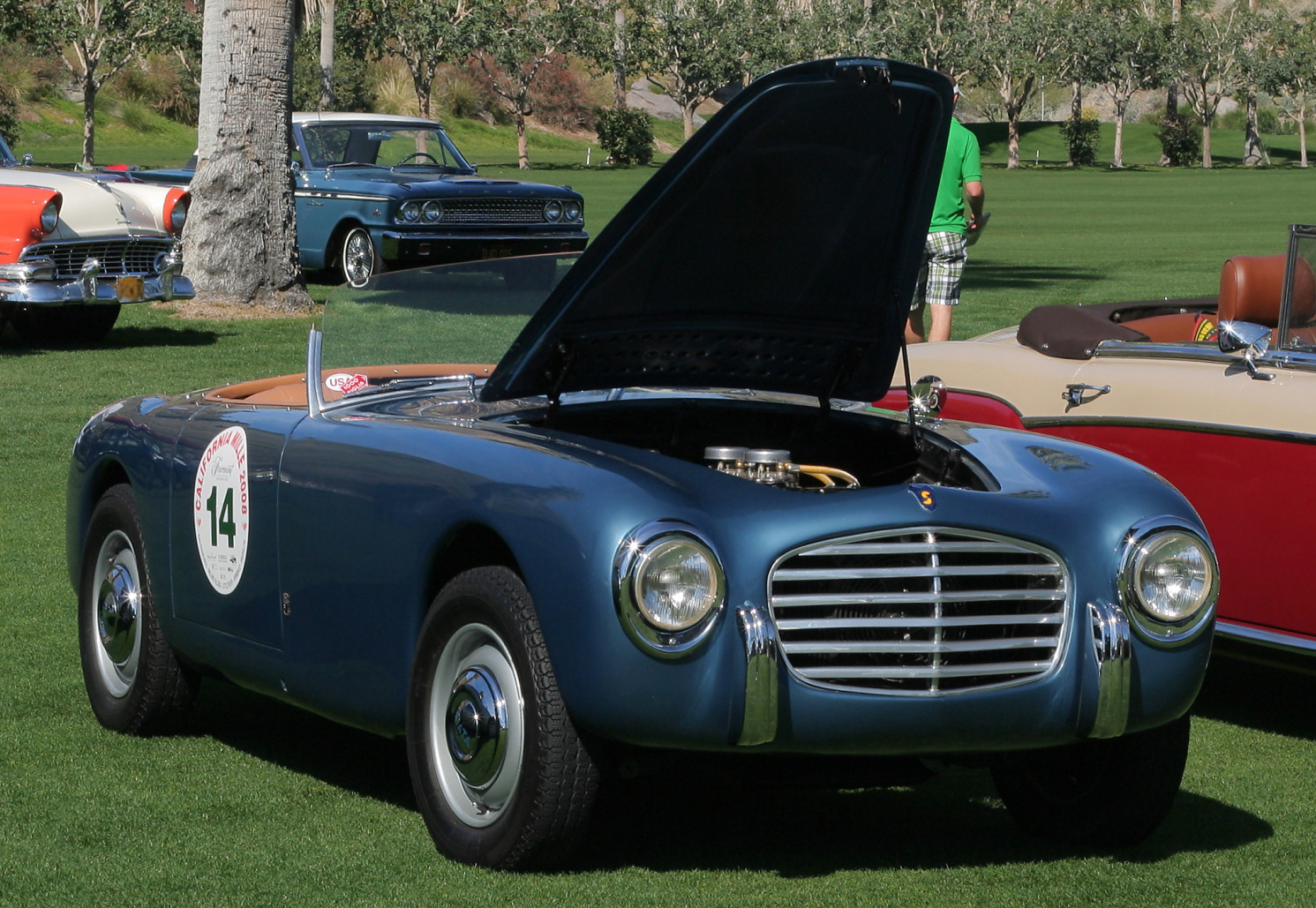
- 1951 Siata Daina Gran Sport bodied by Stabilimenti Farina

Overview
- Manufacturer: Siata
- Also called: Siata Gran Sport
- Production: 1950–1958 (around 50 produced)

Body and chassis
- Body style: 2-door coupe 2-door convertible
- Layout: FR layout
- Related: Fiat 1400

Powertrain
- Engine: 1.4L (1,395 cc) OHV I4; 1.5L (1,500 cc) OHV I4; 1.8L (1,817 cc) OHV I4
- Transmission: 4-speed manual 5-speed manual

Dimensions
- Wheelbase: 2400 mm (94.5 in)

Chronology
- Successor: Siata 208 CS (coupe); Siata 208s (convertible)

The Siata Daina is an Italian car produced by Siata from 1950-1958. The Daina was available as a coupé or a convertible and featured custom bodies by Stabilimenti Farina, Bertone and other coachbuilders.

== Performance ==
Like all Siata cars, the Daina was based on heavily modified Fiat mechanicals. In this case it was the Fiat 1400; the frame was reinforced and shortened while the engine was developed with new head valves, new manifolds, carburetors, and on some models, Abarth exhaust systems. The Daina could be had with a 1.4L (1,395 cc), 1.5L (1,500 cc) or 1.8L (1,817 cc) overhead valve I4 engine, all of which were sourced from Fiat. It featured independent front suspension and a live rear axle with coil springs all around, as well as 4-wheel drum brakes. It could be had with either a 4-speed or 5-speed manual gearbox.

== History ==
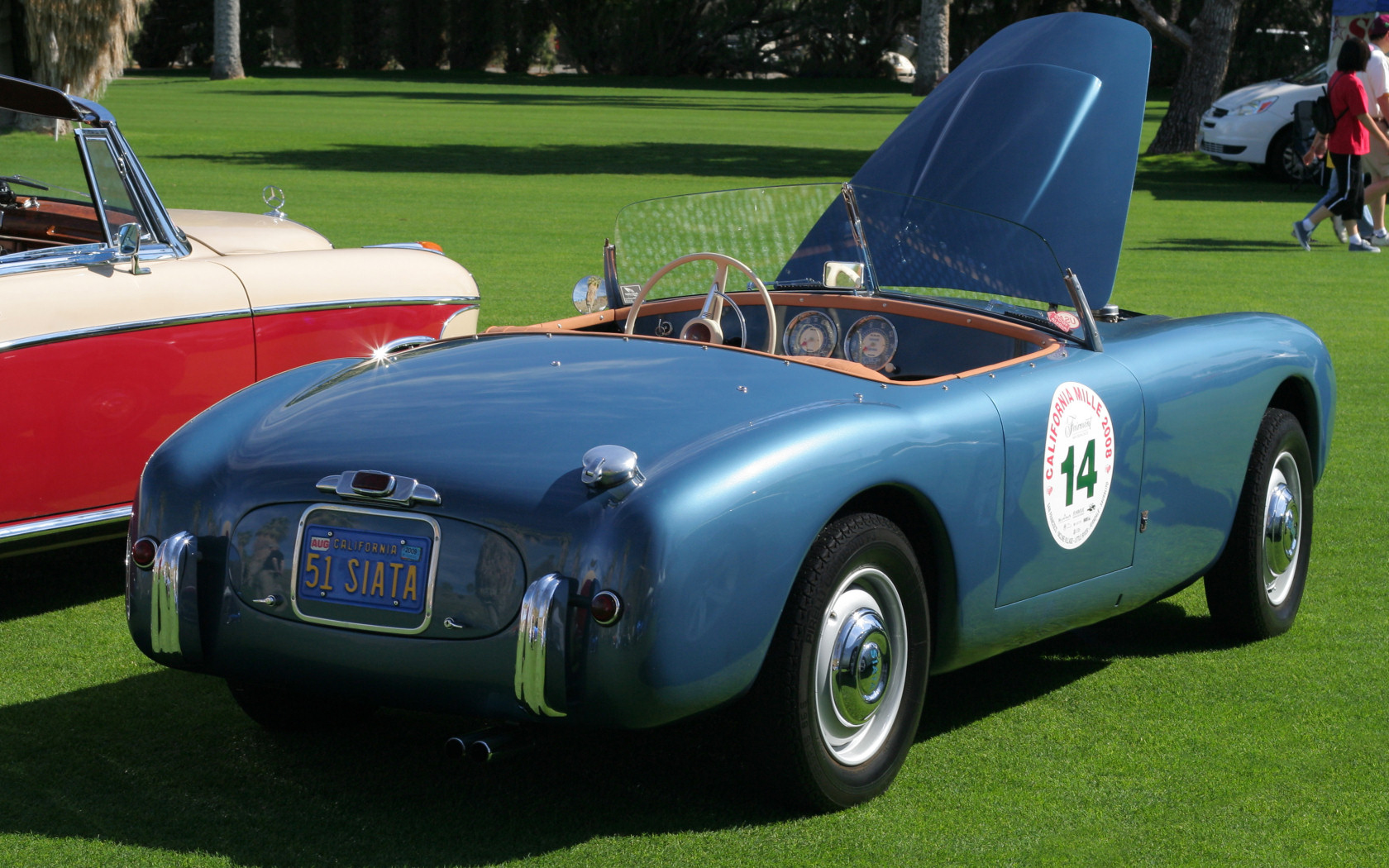
1951 Daina Gran Sport rear end

From 1950 to 1958 there were approximately 200 to 250 Daina Series cars produced. However, only a few of the Series were produced after 1953. Initially a 3 "posti" (seats) coupe and Cabriolet (trasformabile) were designed and built in aluminium with steel doors by Stabilimenti Farina. A Limousine and a sportscar named "Rally" were also built in the early days. Towards the end of the production of the Coupe and the Trasformabile a roadster was added to the line at Stab. Farina, the "Gran Sport", a closed version of the Gran Sport was added to the range, the "Sport". About 20 Daina Sport (coupes) are thought to have been built, at least eight are known to exist today. The Gran Sport comprised most of the Daina Series cars. The Gran Sport had a steel body with an aluminum hood designed by Stabilimenti Farina (3 all aluminum bodied Gran Sports were made as well) but when Stab. Farina closed in 1953, Bertone took over production with both the Sport and the Gran Sport. Furthermore some cars have been built by other coachbuilders.

The most well known Dainas were the Gran Sport (convertible) versions used in racing, with many calling it the "little Ferrari". The car was built to take part in the International Grand Prix and the Mille Miglia. The Daina's most notable finish was at the 12 Hours of Sebring in 1952 when Dick Irish and Bob Fergus piloted a 1,500 cc Daina Gran Sport to first in class and third overall.
