= Ernie McAfee =

American racing driver

- Born: 1919
- Died: 1956 (aged 36–37); Pebble Beach
- Occupations: Race car driver, Car Dealer

Ernie McAfee (1919–1956) was an early hot rodder who was a member of the 90 MPH club and the SCTA Road Runners club of Southern California. He was killed in a vehicular accident in 1956 in Pebble Beach.

== Early Years of Racing ==
Mcafee's main claim to fame in the SoCal area was his 1938 136 mph Modified division record; this record was set in a Winfield-modified 4-cylinder flathead Ford. McAfee raced Modified Fords during the 1930s and was an innovator in streamlining. McAfee, along with fellow SCTA Road Runners Club member Jack Harvey, built and ran the first wheel enclosed Streamliner on Lake Muroc.

== Career ==
McAfee was known after World War II for building and customizing cars through Ernie McAfee Engineering, McAfee during this time also campaigned Siatas, Crosleys, and his all-conquering baby blue 4.9-litre Ferrari. McAfee raced in the La Carrera Panamericana in 1953 as a driver of a Siata 208s, then as co-driver to Porfirio Rubirosa, who campaigned a Ferrari 500 Mondial in the 1954 race. He owned a Ferrari, Siata, Alfa Romeo, Moretti, and O.S.C.A. dealership on Sunset Boulevard in Los Angeles, California. When driving a 1955 OSCA MT4, he was killed during the 1956 running of the Del Monte trophy (Pebble Beach race), after colliding into a tree. He was survived by his wife Jean and daughter Robin.
