= Siata 208 CS =

Coupé sports car manufactured by Italian automaker Siata as a successor to the Daina

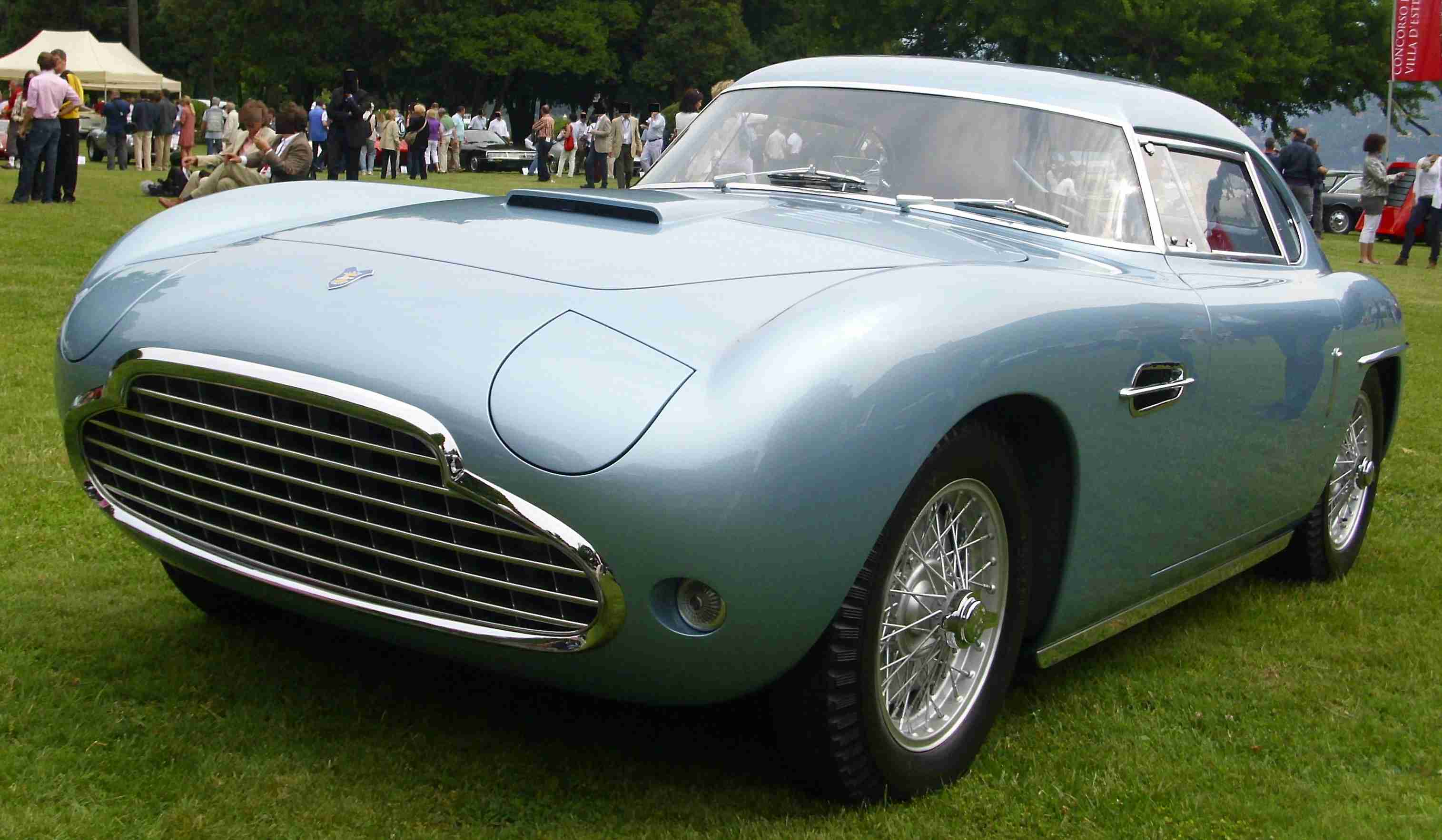
- Siata 208 CS Balbo coupe

Overview
- Manufacturer: Siata
- Also called: Siata 200 CS
- Production: 1952–1954; 18 built (11 bodied by Balbo and 7 bodied by Stabilimenti Farina)

Body and chassis
- Body style: 2-door coupe 2-door spyder
- Layout: FR layout
- Related: Siata 208S; Fiat 8V

Powertrain
- Engine: 2.0 L Fiat tipo 104 V8
- Transmission: 5-speed manual

Chronology
- Predecessor: Siata Daina

The Siata 208 CS is an Italian sports car produced by Siata. Introduced in 1952, it is the coupé counterpart to the Siata 208S released that same year.

== History ==
Introduced in 1952 at that year's Turin Auto Show, the 208 series was the successor to Siata's first foray into fully bespoke automobiles, the Siata Daina. 18 cars are said to have been built, of which 11 were bodied by Balbo while the other 7 featured bodies by Stabilimenti Farina. A handful of the 11 cars bodied by Balbo were badged as "200 CS" while the rest were "208 CS". At least one of the Farina bodied cars built was a convertible/spyder model.

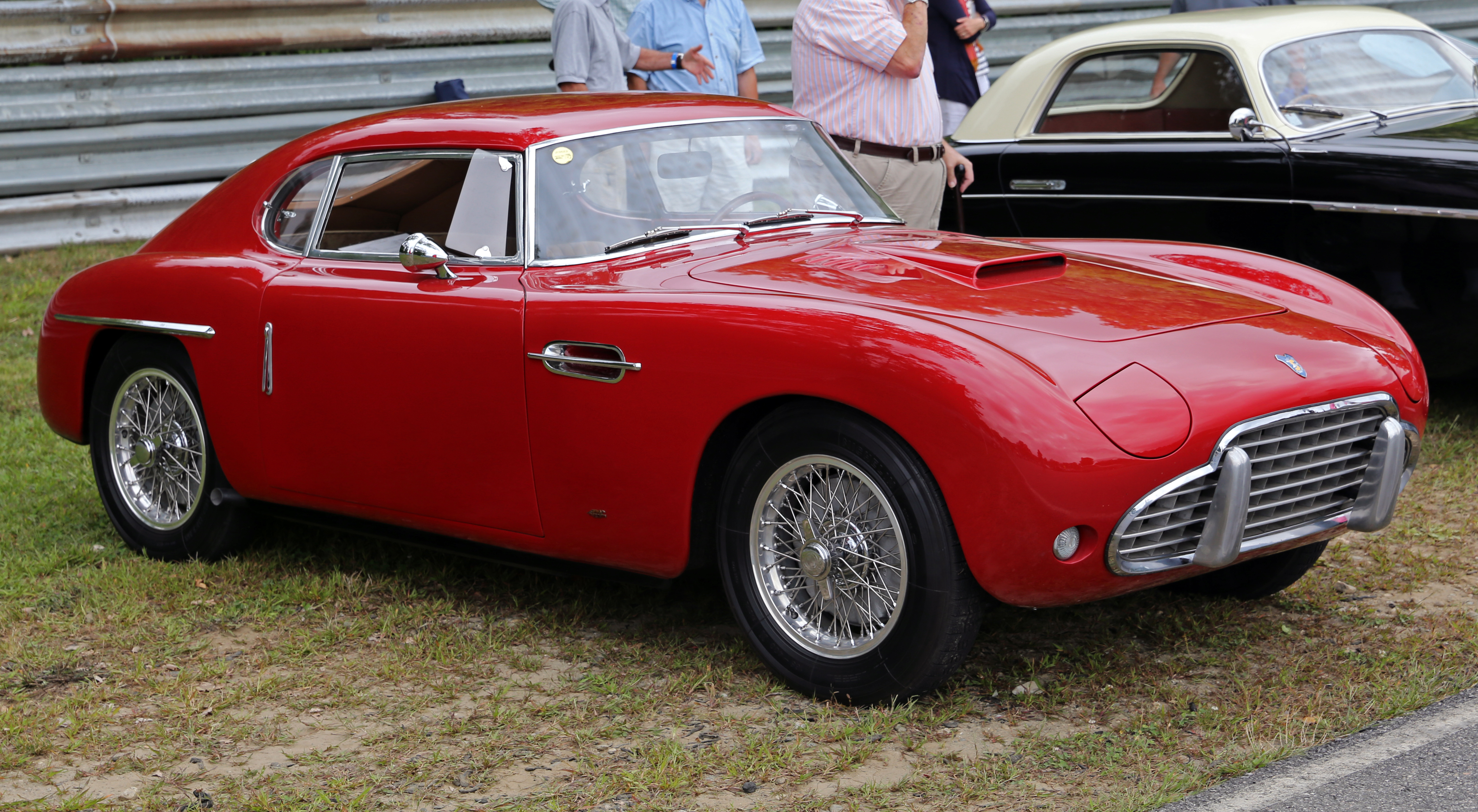
1954 200 CS Balbo coupe

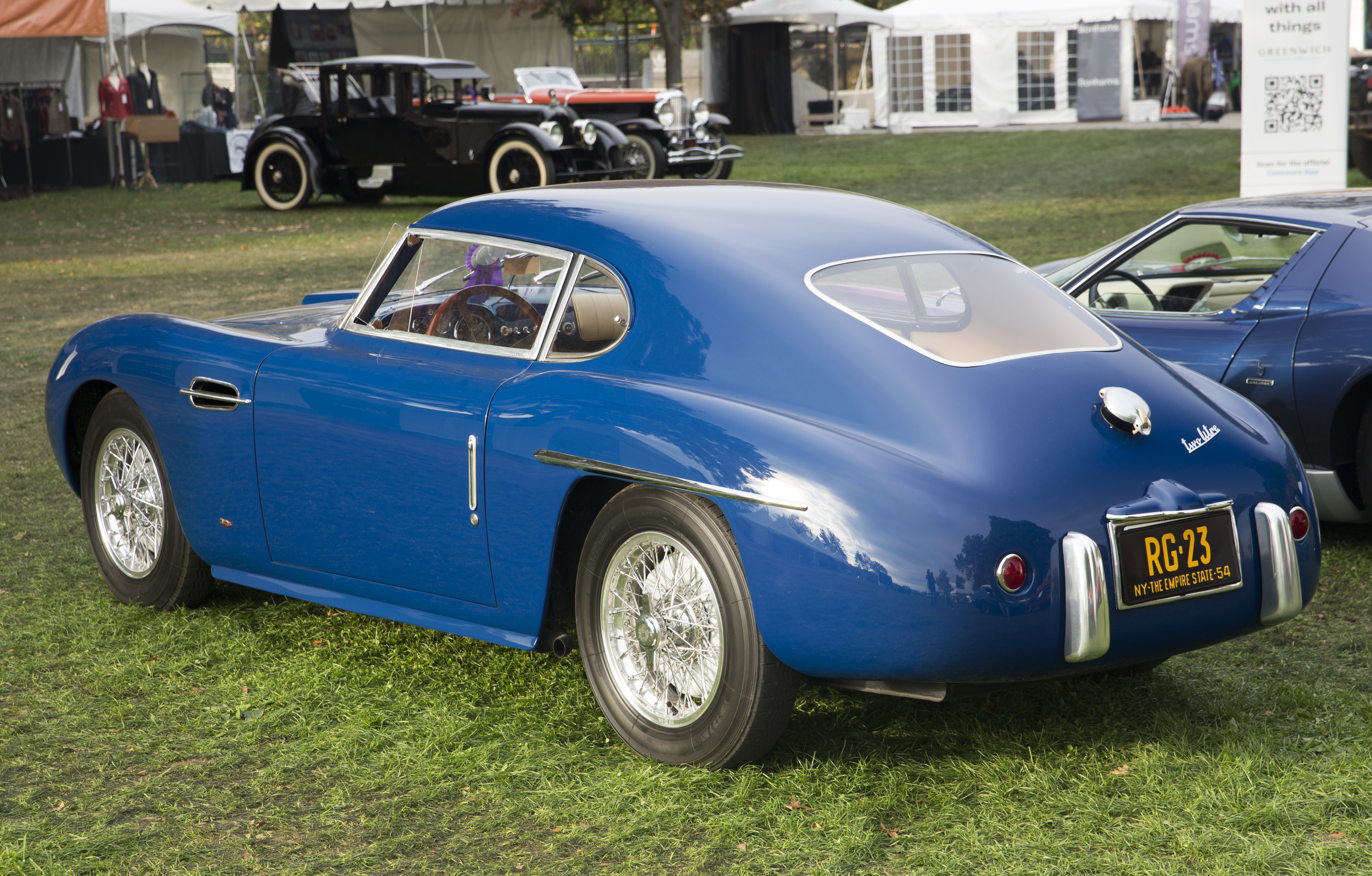
Rear view of same car, repainted the original Blue

== Performance ==
The 208 CS is powered by a tuned version of the Fiat "Otto Vu" engine, a 1,996 cc OHV alloy 70-degree V8, as used in the Fiat 8V. In the 208 CS, though Siata quotes a figure of 110 hp (82 kW), actual power has been measured to be about 125 hp (93 kW) at 6,000 rpm with twin Weber 36 DCF3 carburetors, and 140 hp (104 kW) using Siata's hotter camshaft and triple Weber Carburetors. Power goes to the rear wheels through a 5-speed manual transmission. The 208 CS uses Siata's own tubular chassis design with an aluminum body, giving it a curb weight of around 2,200 lb (1,000 kg) For the drive train, the CS uses four-wheel independent wishbone suspension with coil-springs and shock absorbers and four-wheel hydraulic alloy drum brakes.

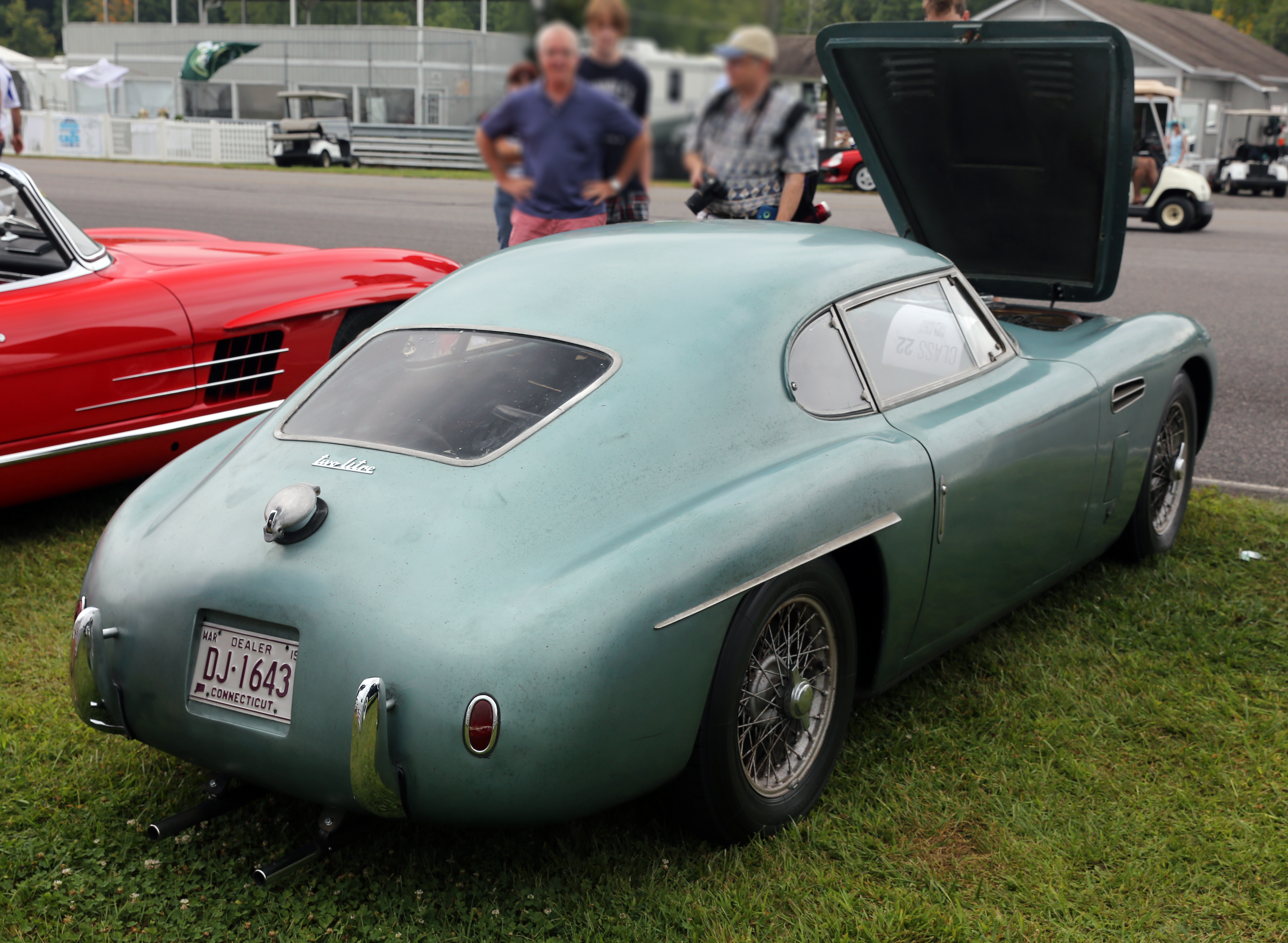
1953 208 CS Farina coupé

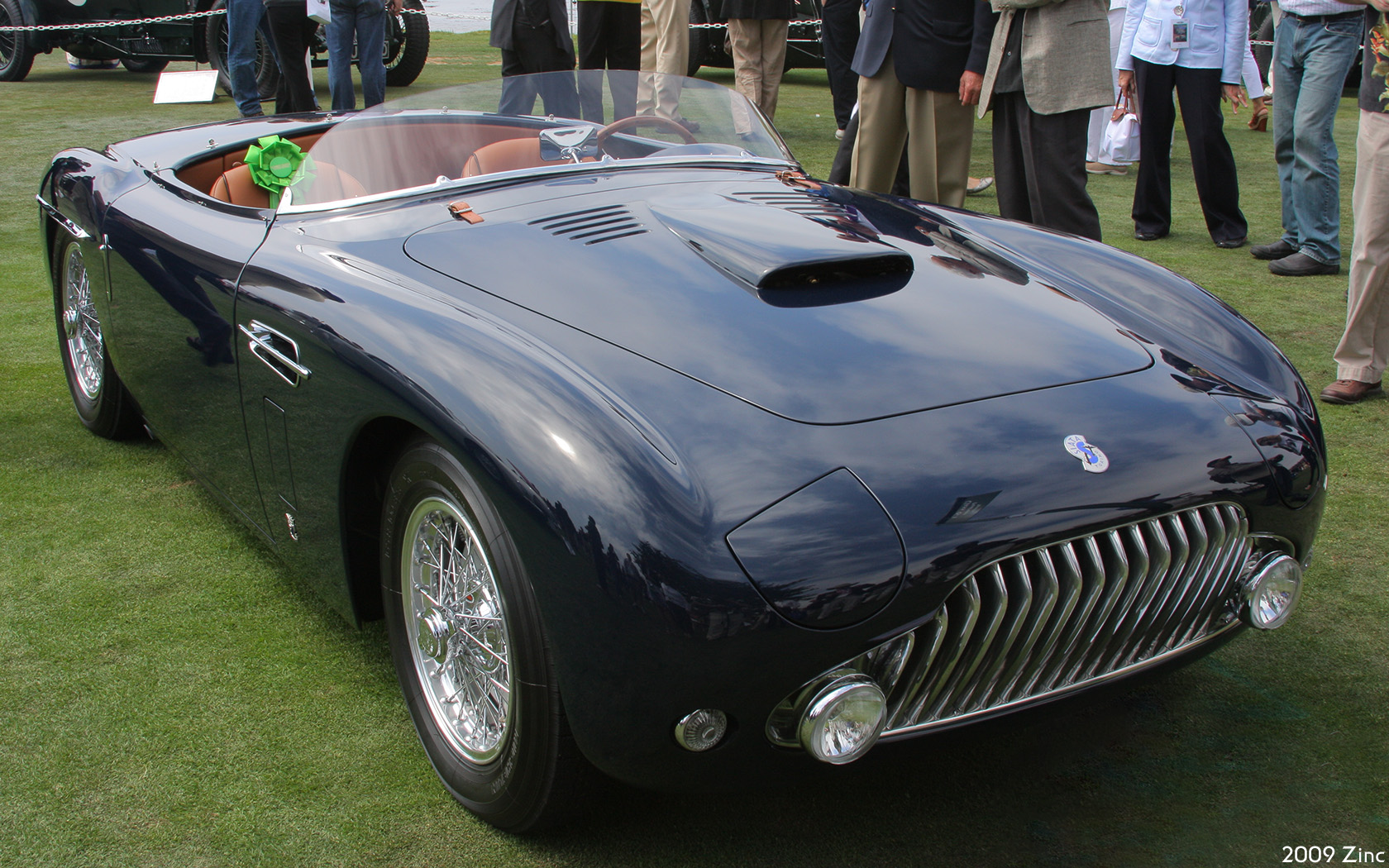
1953 208 CS Stabilimenti Farina Spyder

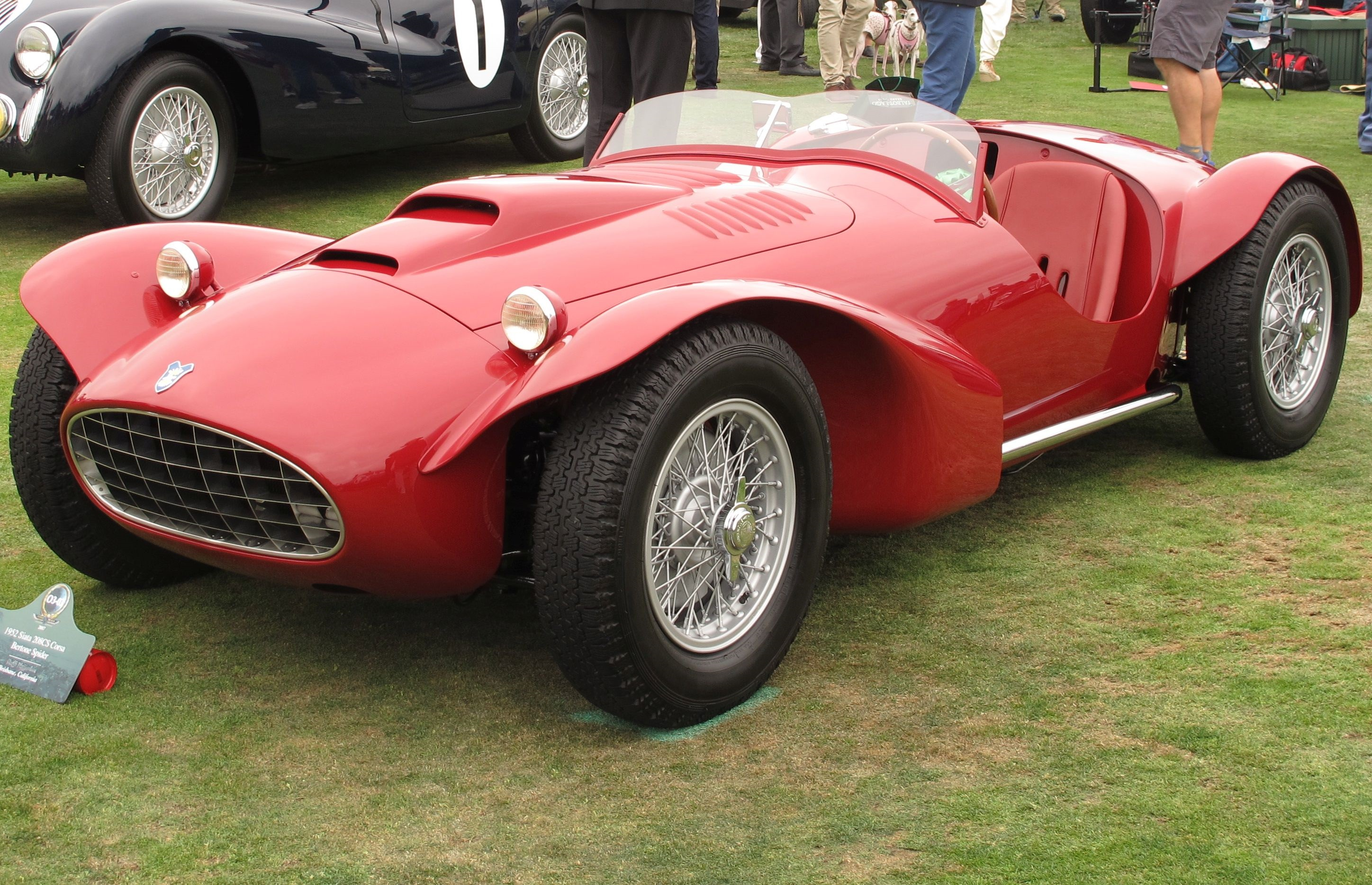
1952 Siata 208 CS Corsa Bertone Spider

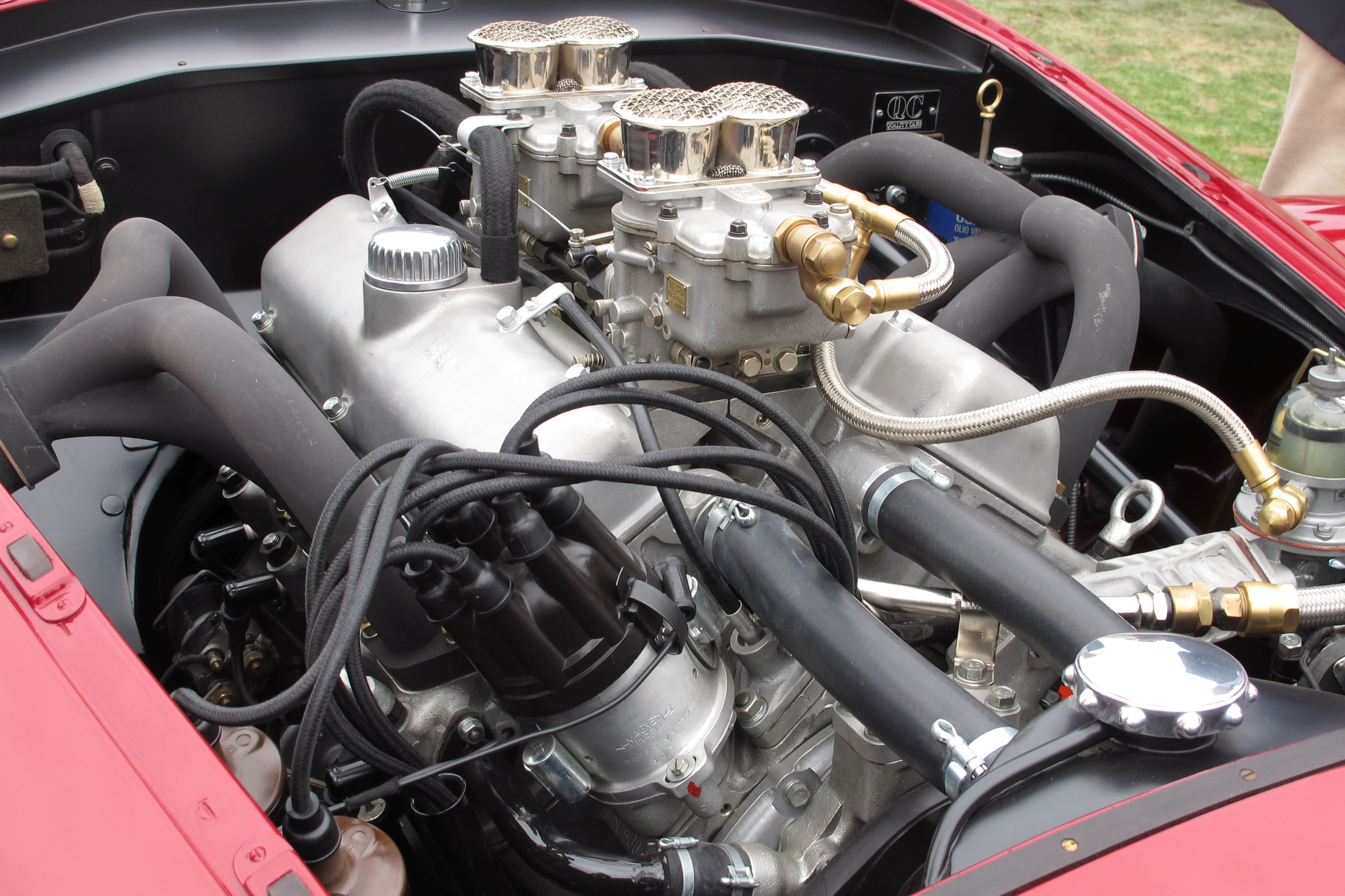
The Fiat V-8 engine in the 208 CS Corsa Spider
