= 208th =

208th may refer to:

- 208th Battalion (Canadian Irish), CEF, a unit in the Canadian Expeditionary Force during the First World War
- 208th Infantry Division (Wehrmacht), a large German military unit during World War II
- 208th Rifle Division, a Soviet infantry division in the Red Army during World War II
- 208th (Sussex) Field Company, Royal Engineers, a Territorial unit of the British Army 1920–1961

== See also ==
- 208 (number)
- 208, the year 208 (CCVIII) of the Julian calendar
- 208 BC
