= Fiat 8V =

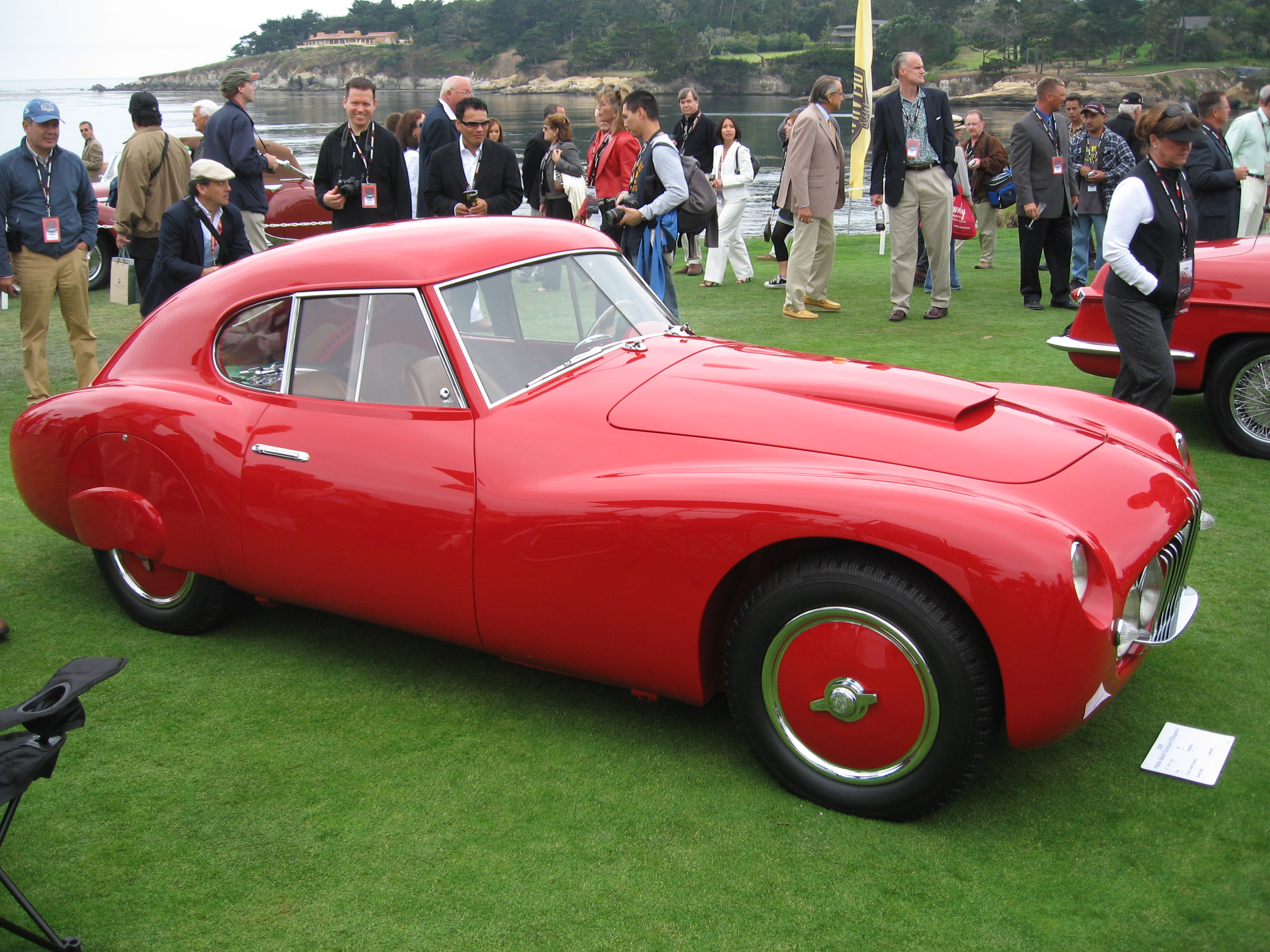
- The first style for the 8V by Fiat's chief designer Luigi Rapi.

Overview
- Manufacturer: Fiat
- Production: 1952–1954 (114 made)
- Designer: Dante Giacosa; Luigi Rapi

Body and chassis
- Class: Sports car
- Body style: 2-door coupé
- Layout: Front-engine, rear-wheel-drive
- Related: Siata 208s Siata 208 CS

Powertrain
- Engine: 2.0 L Fiat tipo 104 V8
- Transmission: 4-speed manual

Dimensions
- Wheelbase: 2,400 mm (94.5 in)
- Length: 4,040 mm (159.1 in)
- Width: 1,570 mm (61.8 in)
- Height: 1,290 mm (50.8 in)
- Kerb weight: 997 kg (2,198 lb)

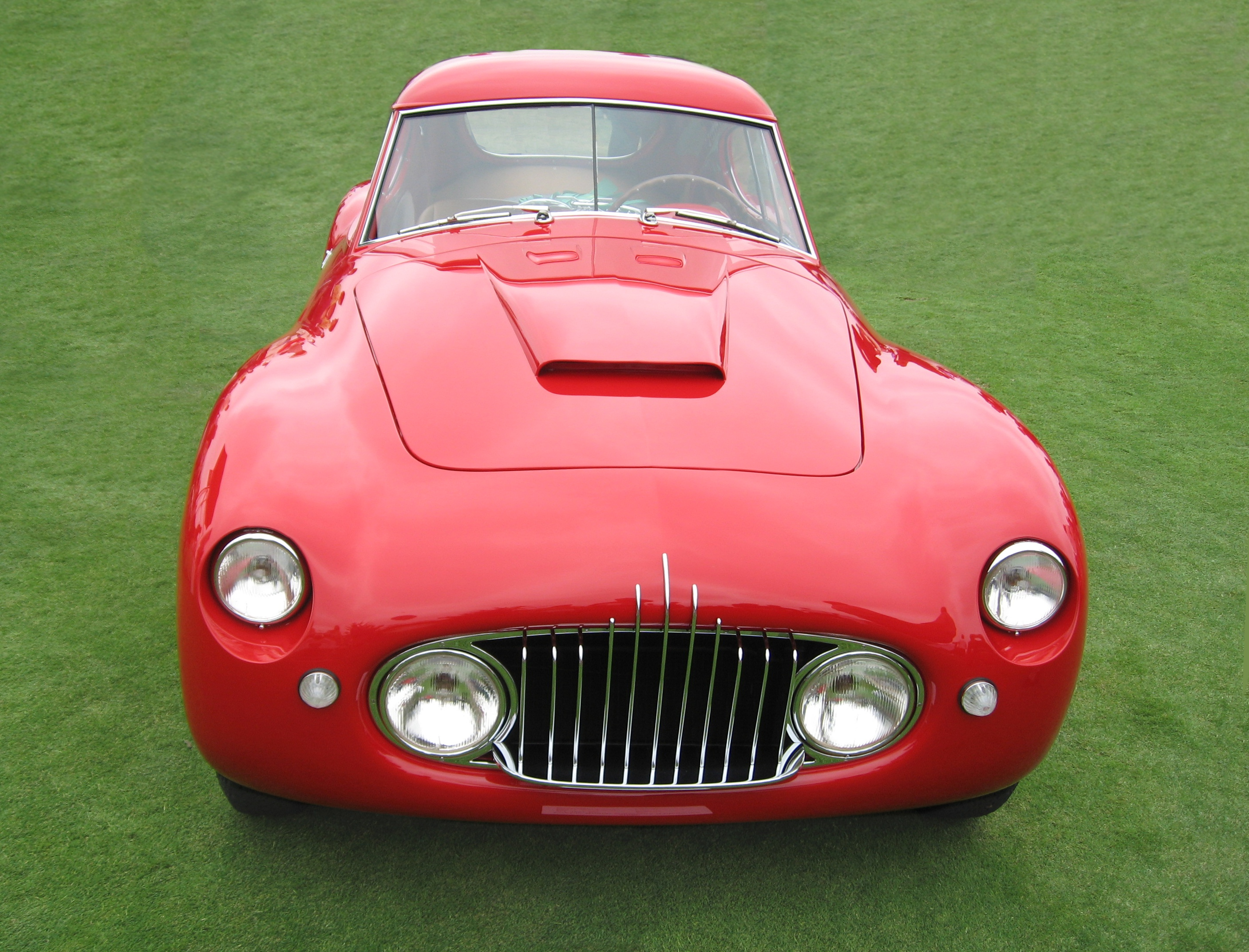
First style headlights

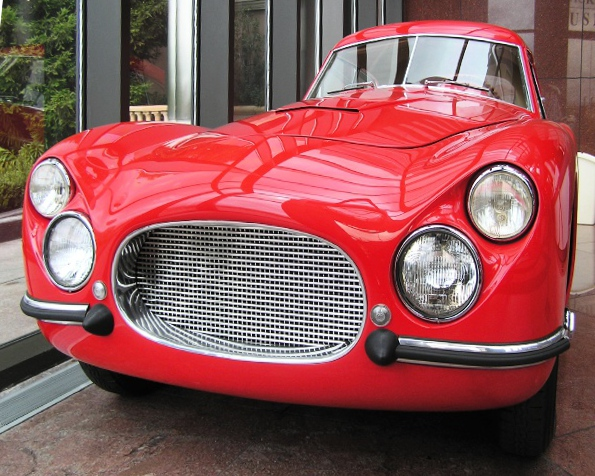
1955 Berlinetta, 1 of 3 built by Fiat

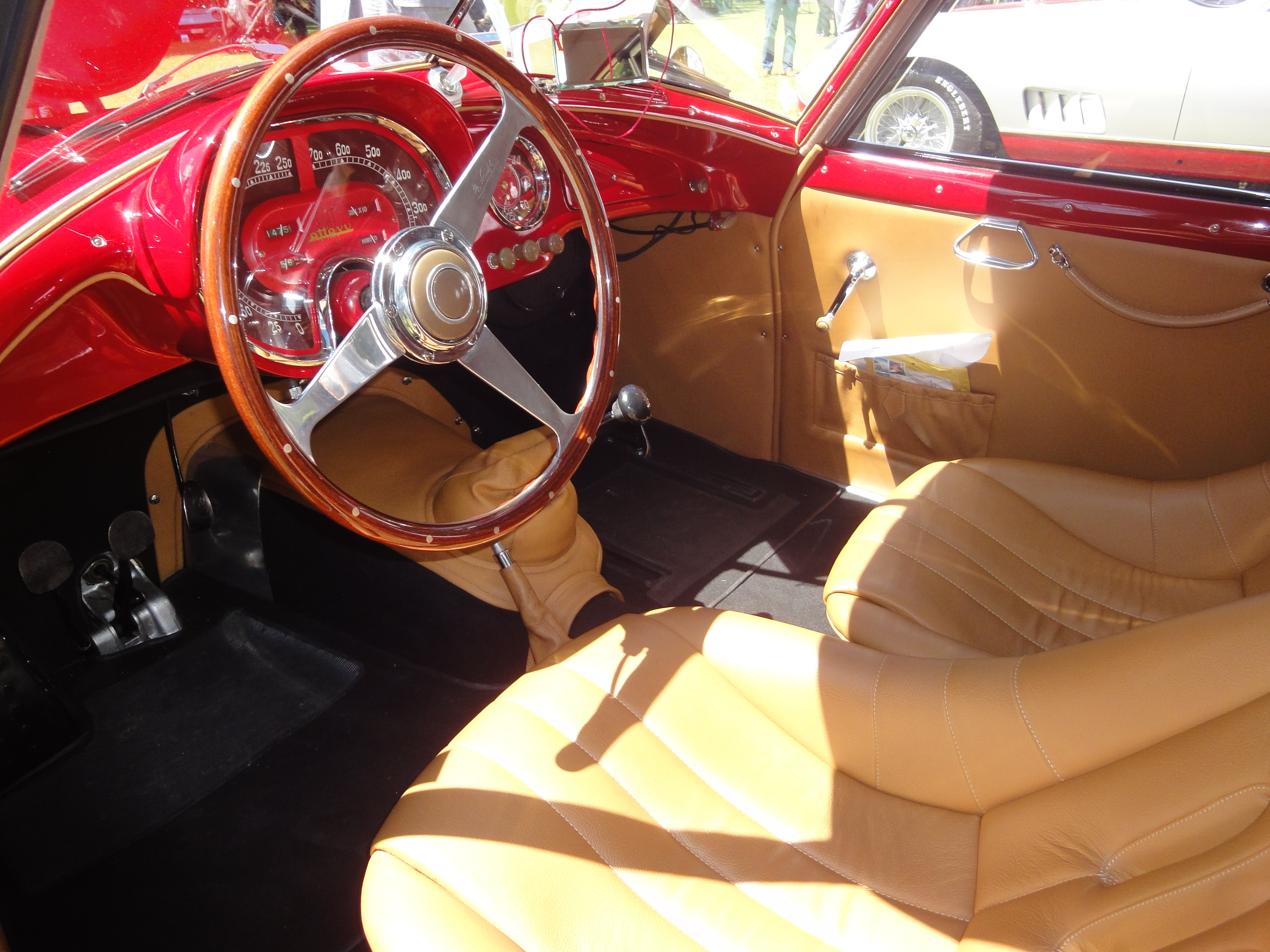
Interior

The Fiat 8V (or "Otto Vu") is a V8-engined sports car produced by the Italian car manufacturer Fiat from 1952 to 1954. The car was introduced at the 1952 Geneva Motor Show. The Fiat 8V got its name because at the time of its making, Fiat believed Ford had a copyright on "V8". With 114 made, the 8V was not a commercial success but did well in racing. Apart from the differential, the car did not share any parts with the other Fiats; many parts were made by Siata and they used them for their cars. The 8V was developed by Dante Giacosa and the stylist Luigi Rapi. The engine was a V8 originally designed for a luxury sedan, but that project was stopped.

The Fiat V8 had a 70 degree V configuration, displaced 1,996 cc and was fitted with two twin-choke Weber 36 DCF 3 carburettors. In its first iteration (type 104.000) the engine had a compression ratio of 8.5:1 and produced 105 PS (77 kW; 104 hp) at 5,600 rpm, giving the car a top speed of 190 km/h (118 mph). Improved type 104.003 had different camshaft timing for 115 PS (85 kW; 113 hp) at 6,000 rpm; finally type 104.006 with an 8.75:1 compression ratio, revised camshaft timing and fuel system put out 127 PS (93 kW; 125 hp) at 6,600 rpm. The engine was connected to a four speed gearbox. The car had drum brakes on all four wheels and was the first Fiat with independent suspension all round.

Top management were preoccupied with more run of the mill projects, however, and only 114 of the high-performance coupés had been produced by the time the cars were withdrawn from production in 1954. Nevertheless, they continued to win the Italian 2-litre GT championship every year until 1959.

34 of the cars had a factory produced bodywork by Fiat's Dipartimento Carrozzerie Derivate e Speciali ("Special Bodies Department"). Some cars had the bodywork done by other Italian coachbuilders. Carrozzeria Zagato made 30 that they labelled "Elaborata Zagato". Ghia and Vignale also made bodyworks. Most were coupés, but some cabriolets were made as well.

An example fitted with a factory-style glass-fibre reinforced plastic body was displayed at the 1954 Turin Motor Show. The composite bodyshell—produced by Fiat's experimental bodywork department—weighed just 48.5 kg (106.9 lb). This 8V is a part of FCA Heritage collection and currently resides in the Centro Storico Fiat in Turin.

== Ghia Supersonic ==
Ghia designed and produced a limited run of cars named 'Supersonic', with special 'jet age' bodywork. Ghia had recently been sold by Boano to Luigi Segre, and a one-off Alfa Romeo 1900 had been built for a wealthy entrant in the 1953 Mille Miglia race. The car was displayed at the Turin show same year and the reaction inspired Segre to plan a limited production of cars based on the Otto Vu, aimed at the American market. Only eight were completed, after mechanical issues ended the project. Several of the cars were purchased by Americans; some were heavily customized and received engine transplants. An original un-restored car sold at a Scottsdale, Arizona Gooding and Company auction in January 2011 with a gavel price of US$1.55 million ($1.7M including buyer's premium). Ghia would later use its basic body shape on Jaguar XK-120–based vehicles as well as Aston Martin. Design of 'Supersonic' is credited to Giovanni Savonuzzi.

Special coupés

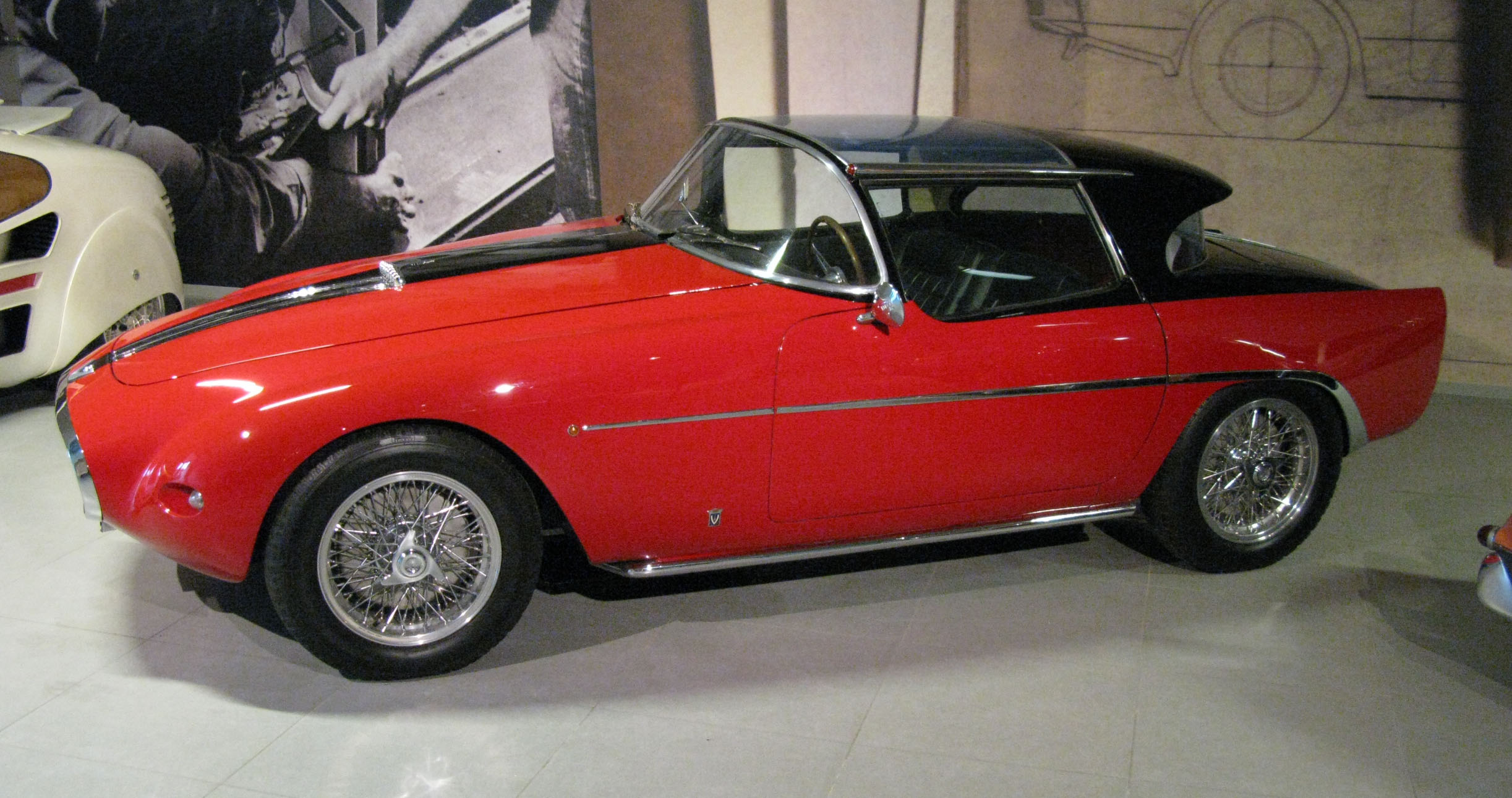
Demon Rouge 1953 by Michelotti at Vignale (3 made)

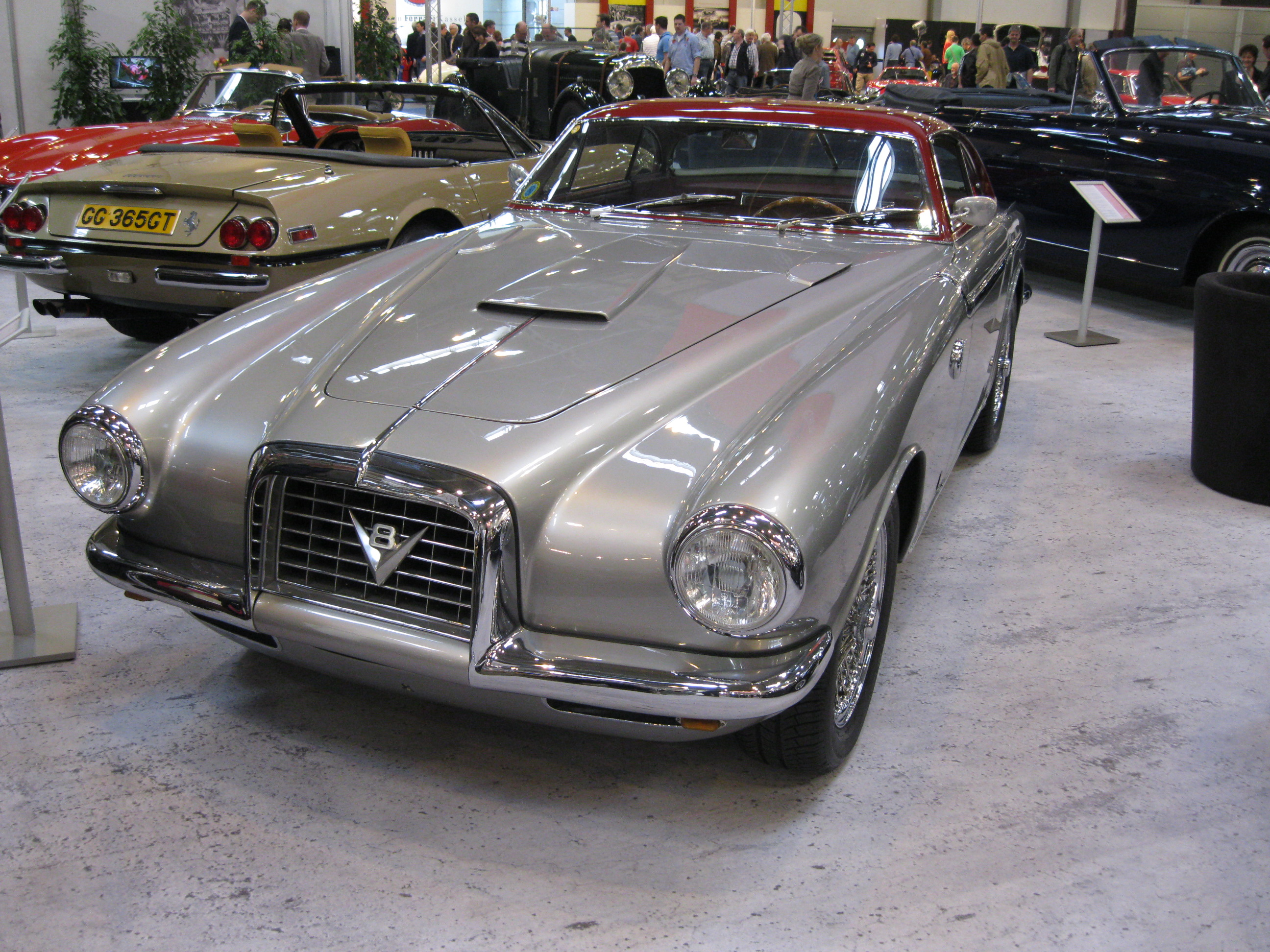
One-off by Vignale 1953

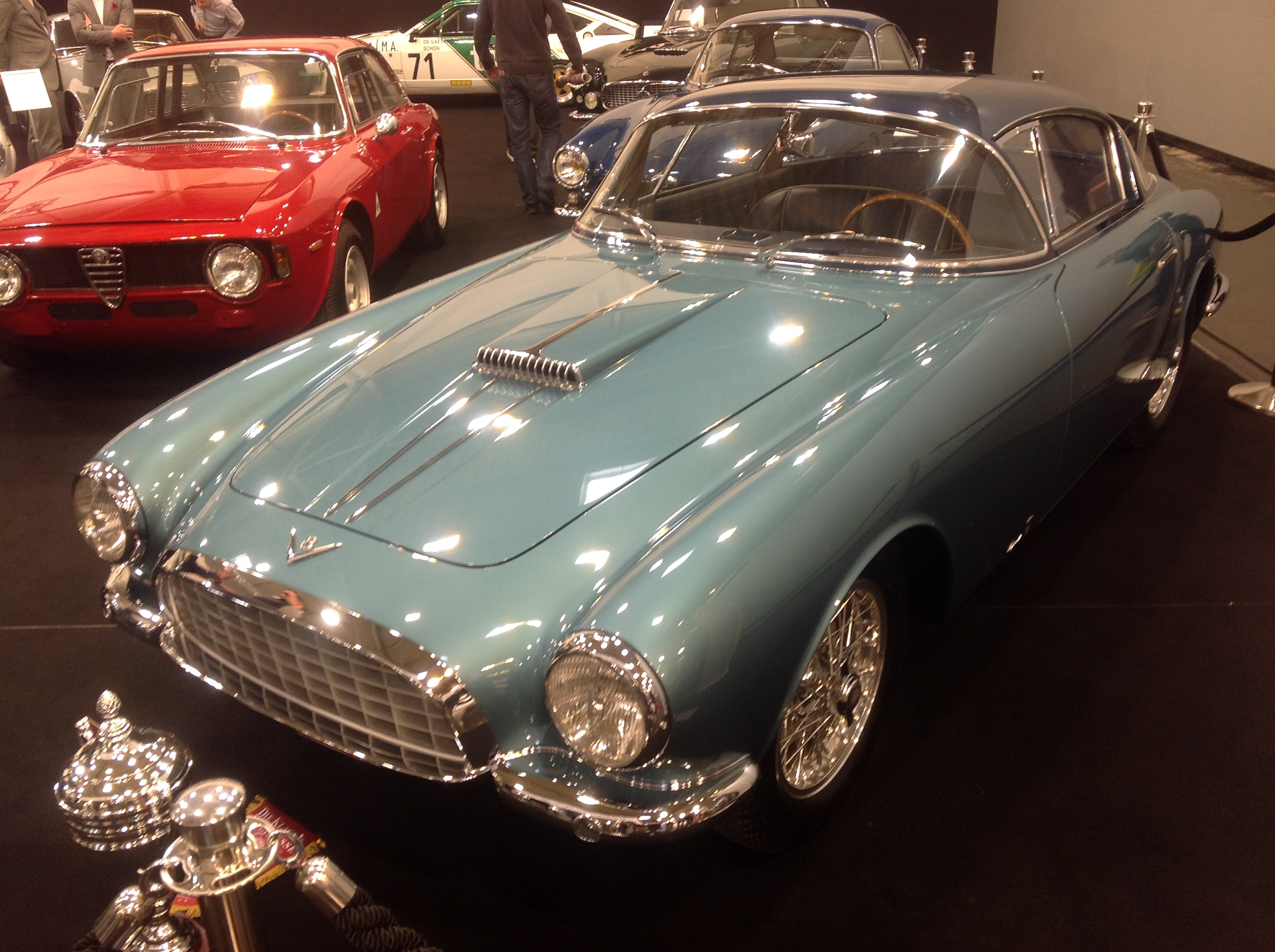
Another 8V by Vignale

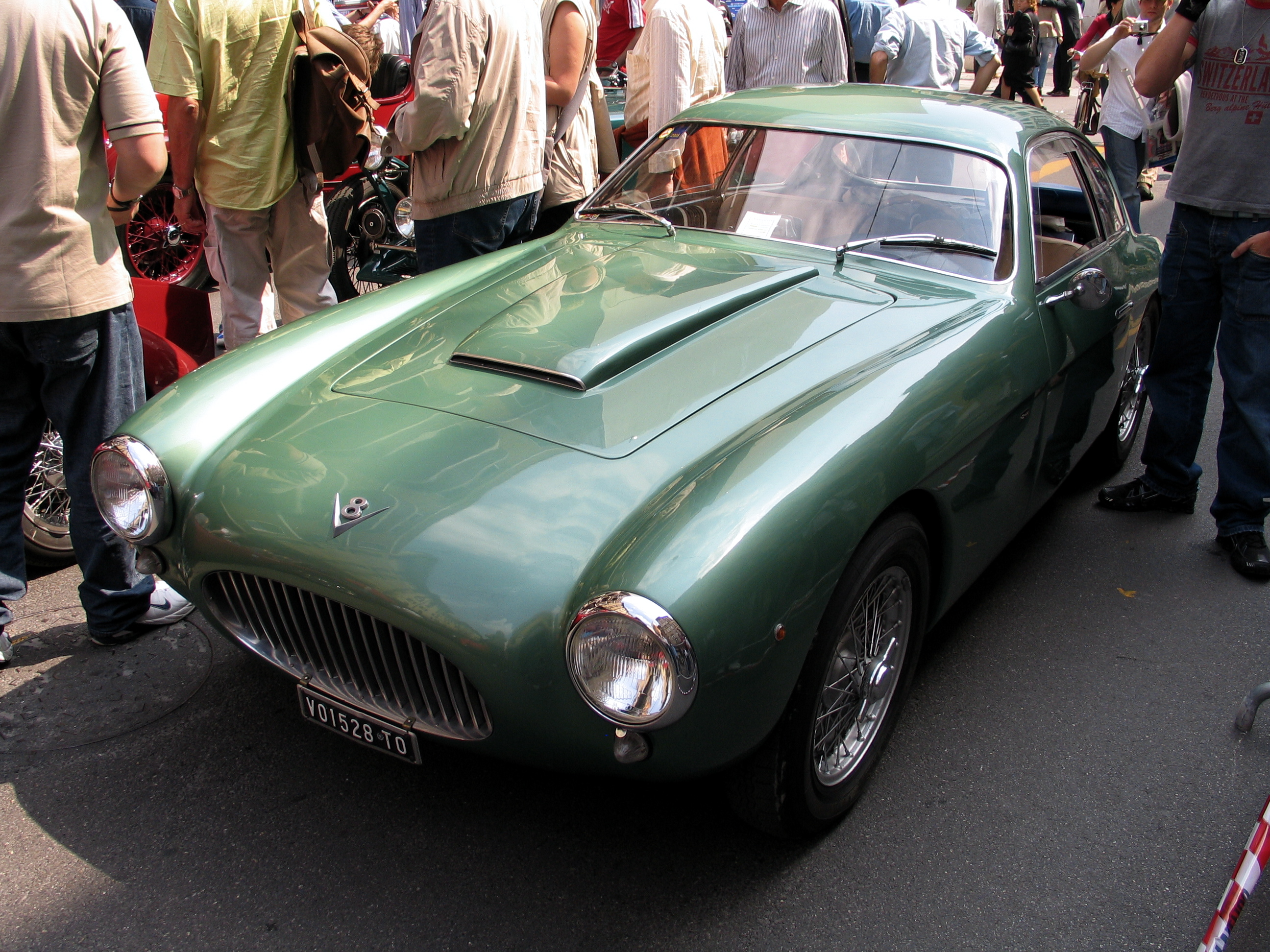
Zagato

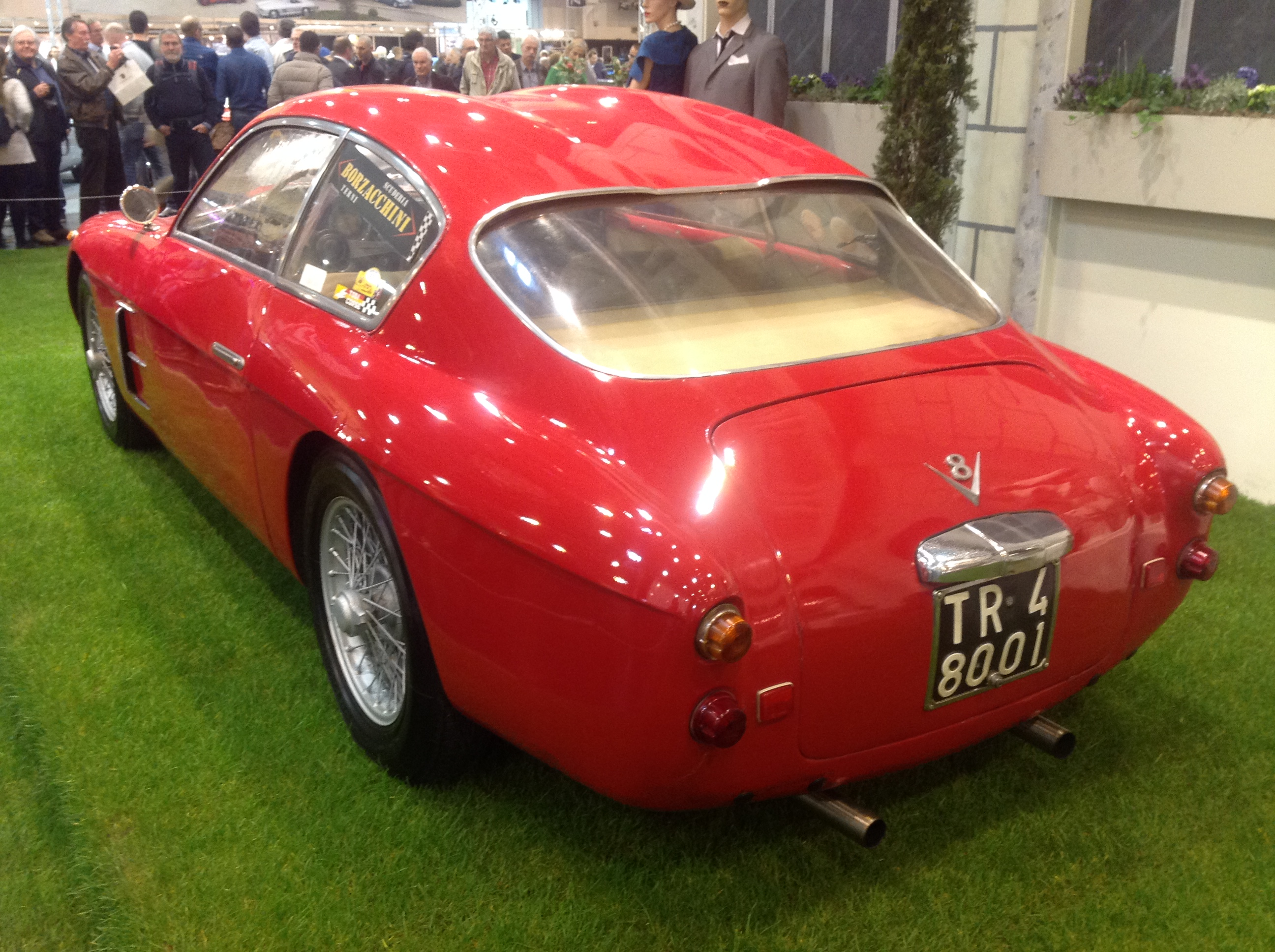
Elaborata by Zagato bubble roof

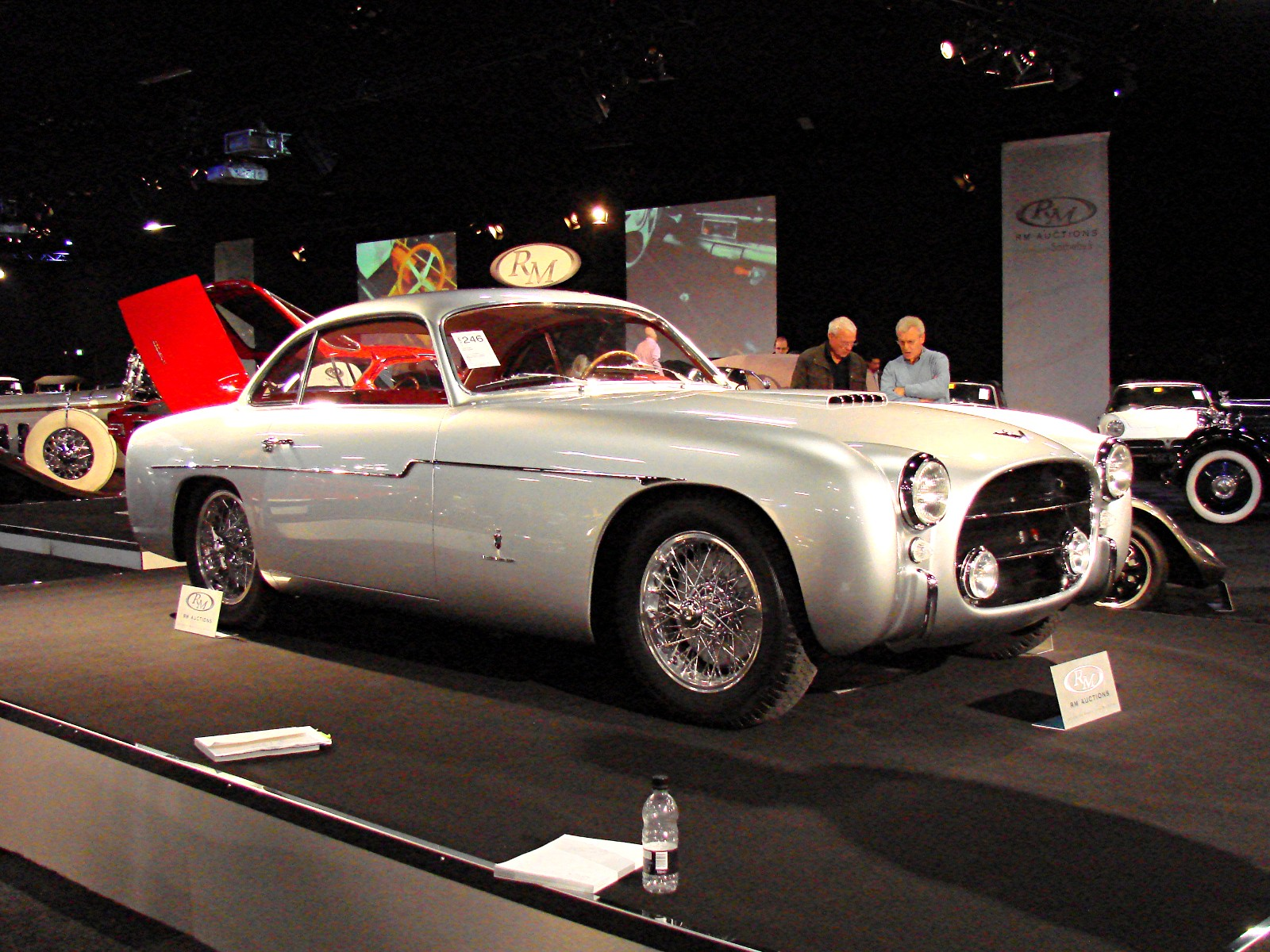
The only non-Supersonic Fiat 8V bodied by Ghia

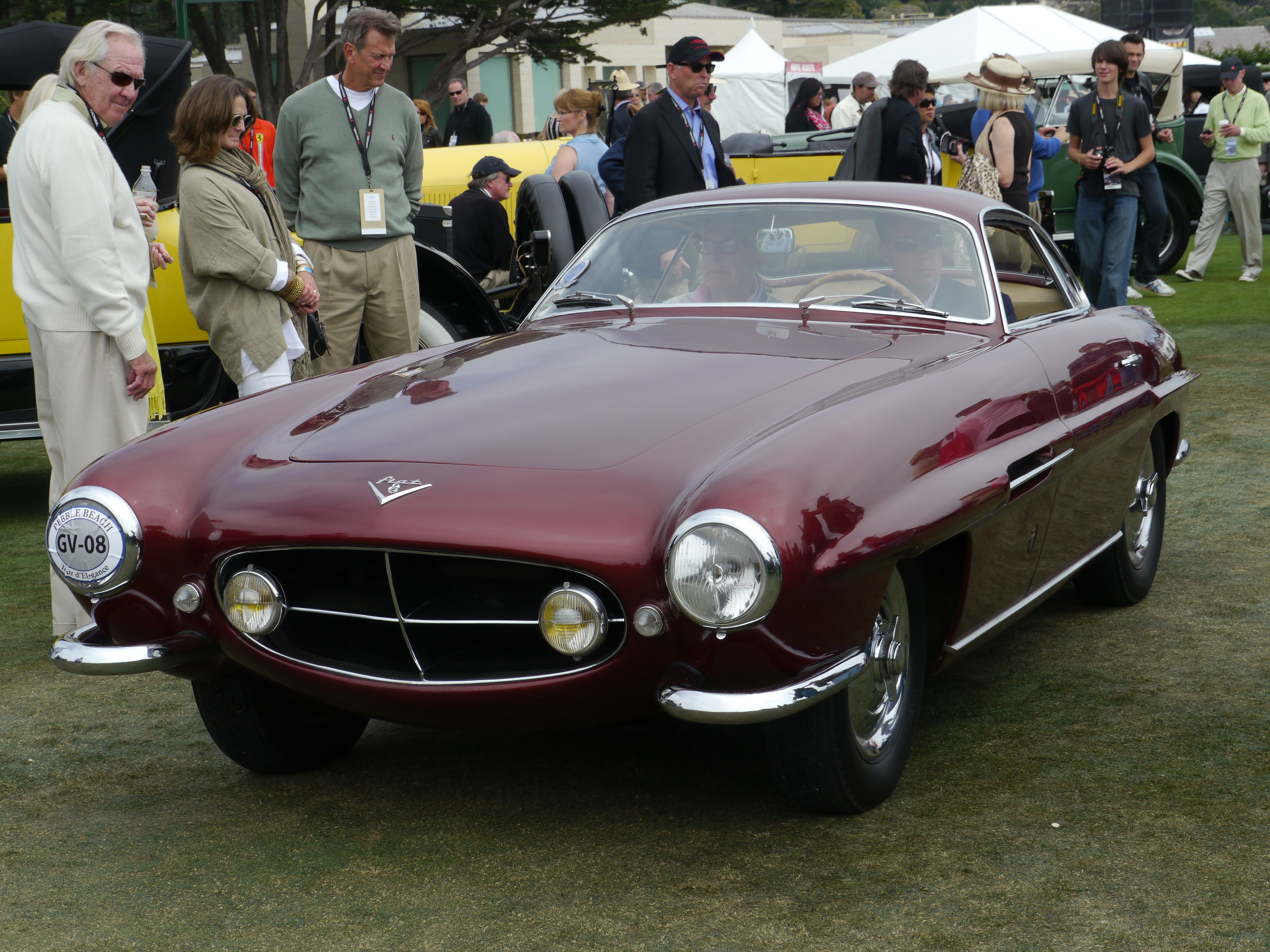
Supersonic by Ghia 1953
