= Ferrari 208 =

Ferrari 208 may refer to the following cars:

- Ferrari 208 GT4, a Bertone-styled 2+2 with a 1990 cc engine
- Ferrari 208 GTB/GTS, a Pininfarina-styled 2-seat with a 1991 cc engine, later available with a turbocharged engine
