= Siata 208S =

Convertible sports car manufactured by Siata

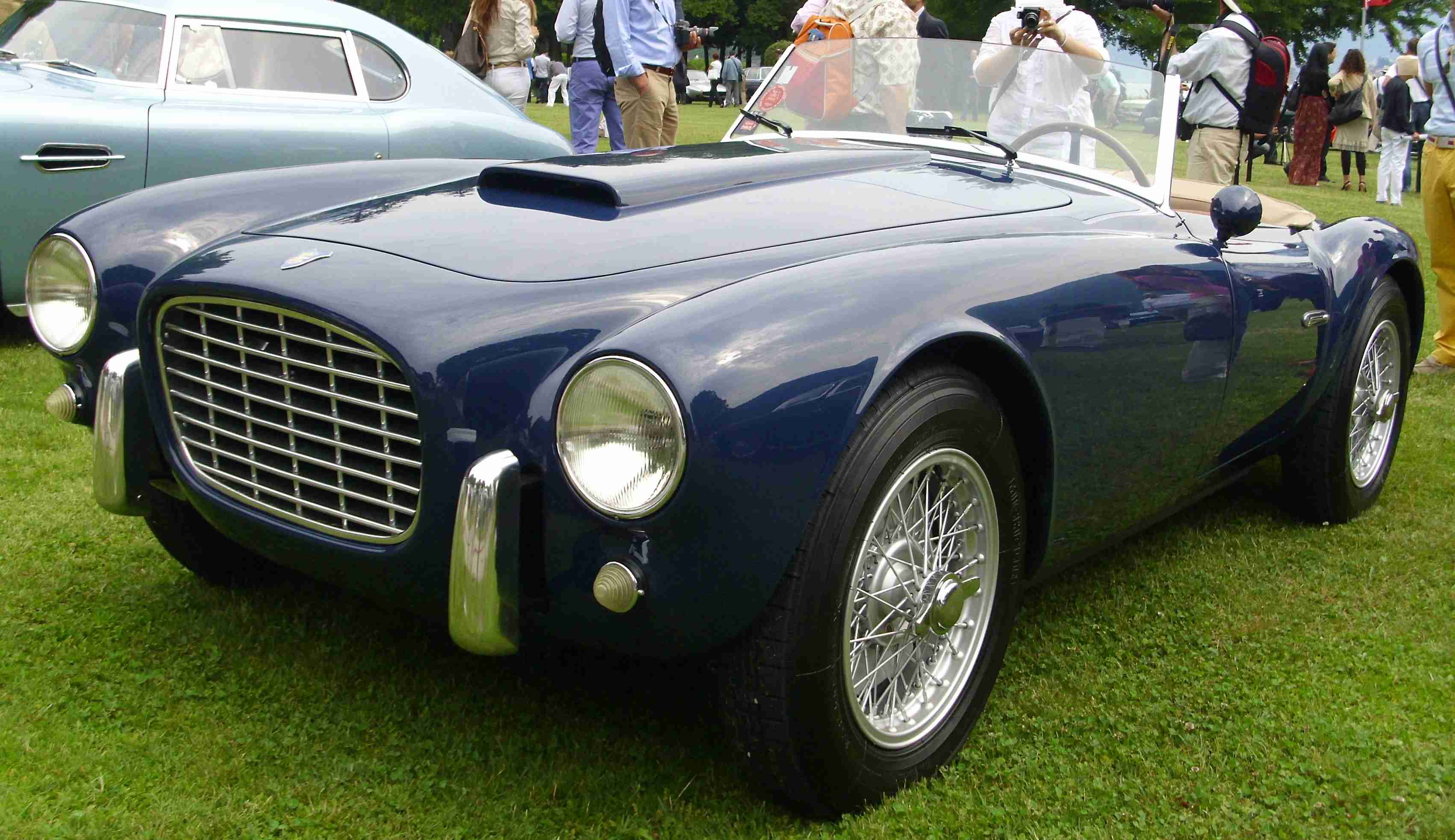

Overview
- Manufacturer: Siata
- Production: 1952
- Model years: 1953–1955 (35 produced)
- Designer: Giovanni Michelotti

Body and chassis
- Body style: 2-door roadster
- Layout: FR Layout
- Related: Siata 208 CS; Fiat 8V

Powertrain
- Engine: 2.0L Fiat tipo 104 V8
- Transmission: 5-speed manual

Dimensions
- Wheelbase: 2,692 mm (106 in)
- Curb weight: 1960 lb (889 kg)

Chronology
- Predecessor: Siata Daina

The Siata 208S is an Italian sports car produced by Siata. Presented in 1952, the 208S wore a lightweight sports spider aluminum body designed by Giovanni Michelotti and built by Rocco Motto. Only 35 examples of the 208S were produced, including the two Bertone designed prototypes. It is the roadster counterpart to the Siata 208 CS.

== History ==
The car rose to prominence after actor and race car driver Steve McQueen purchased model BS523 from Los Angeles-based Siata importer Ernie McAfee in the mid-1950s. McQueen reportedly rebadged the car with Ferrari emblems and dubbed the car his "Little Ferrari".

== Performance ==
Mechanically, the 208S was derived partly from the Fiat 8V, with which it shared Fiat's all alloy Tipo 104 70° 2-liter V8 engine. This engine produced 125 hp (93.2 kW) and allowed it to reach a top speed of 200 km/h (124 mph). Road & Track recorded a 0-60 mph (97 km/h) time of 12.4 seconds and a quarter mile time of 17.8 seconds during its tests. The 208s wore all aluminum bodywork and featured four wheel independent suspension which was advanced for its time.

== Gallery ==
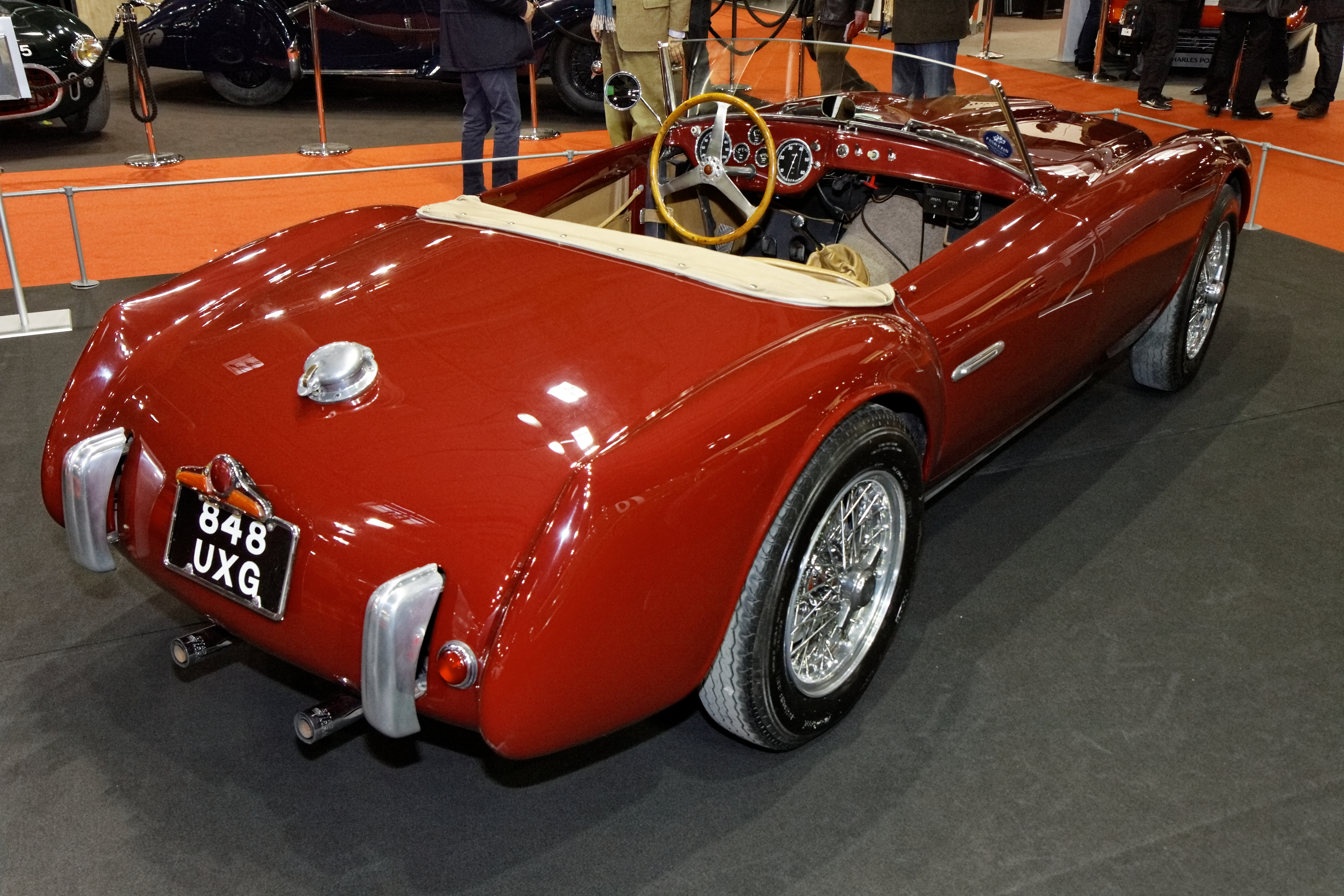
208s at Rétromobile in 2012

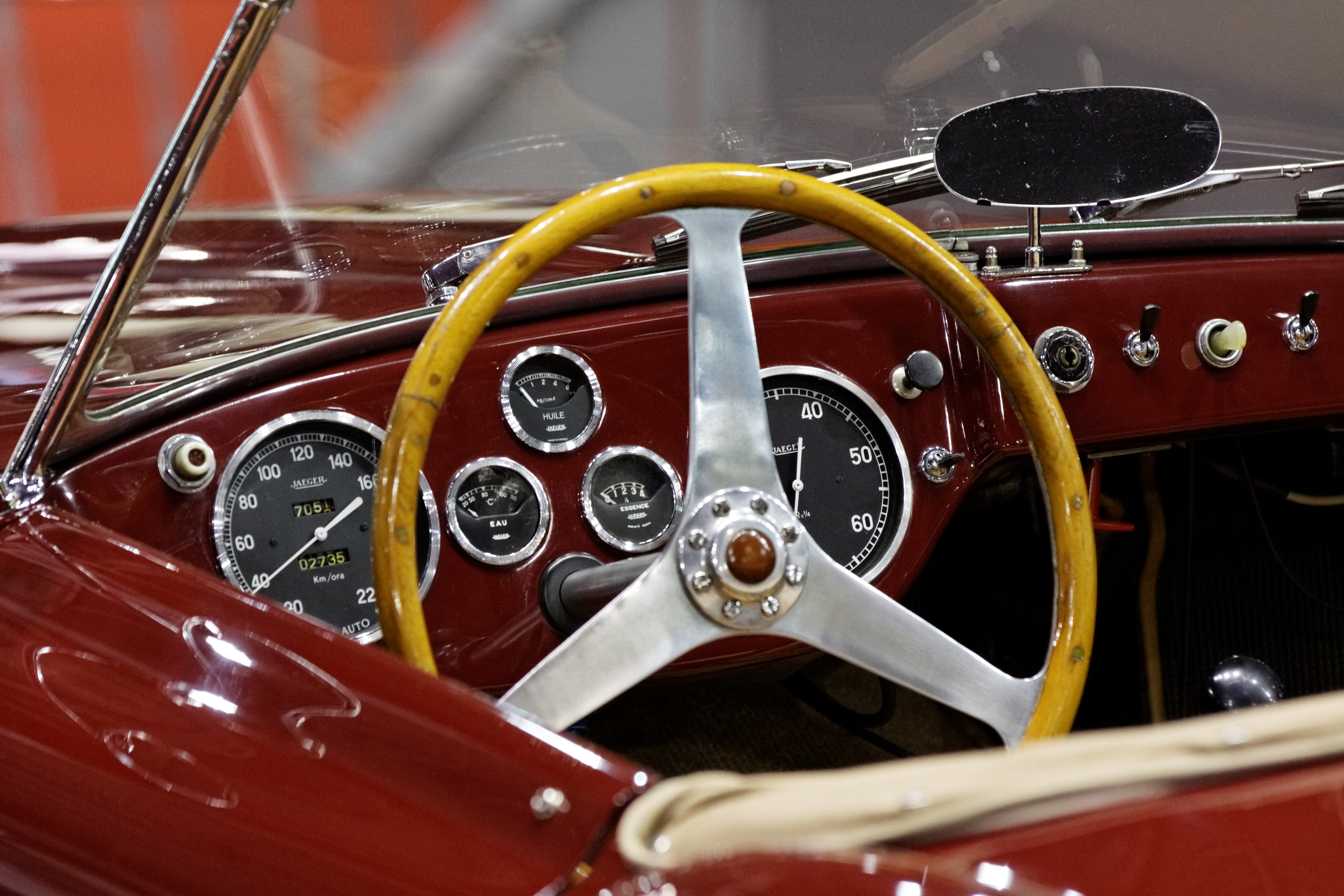
208s interior

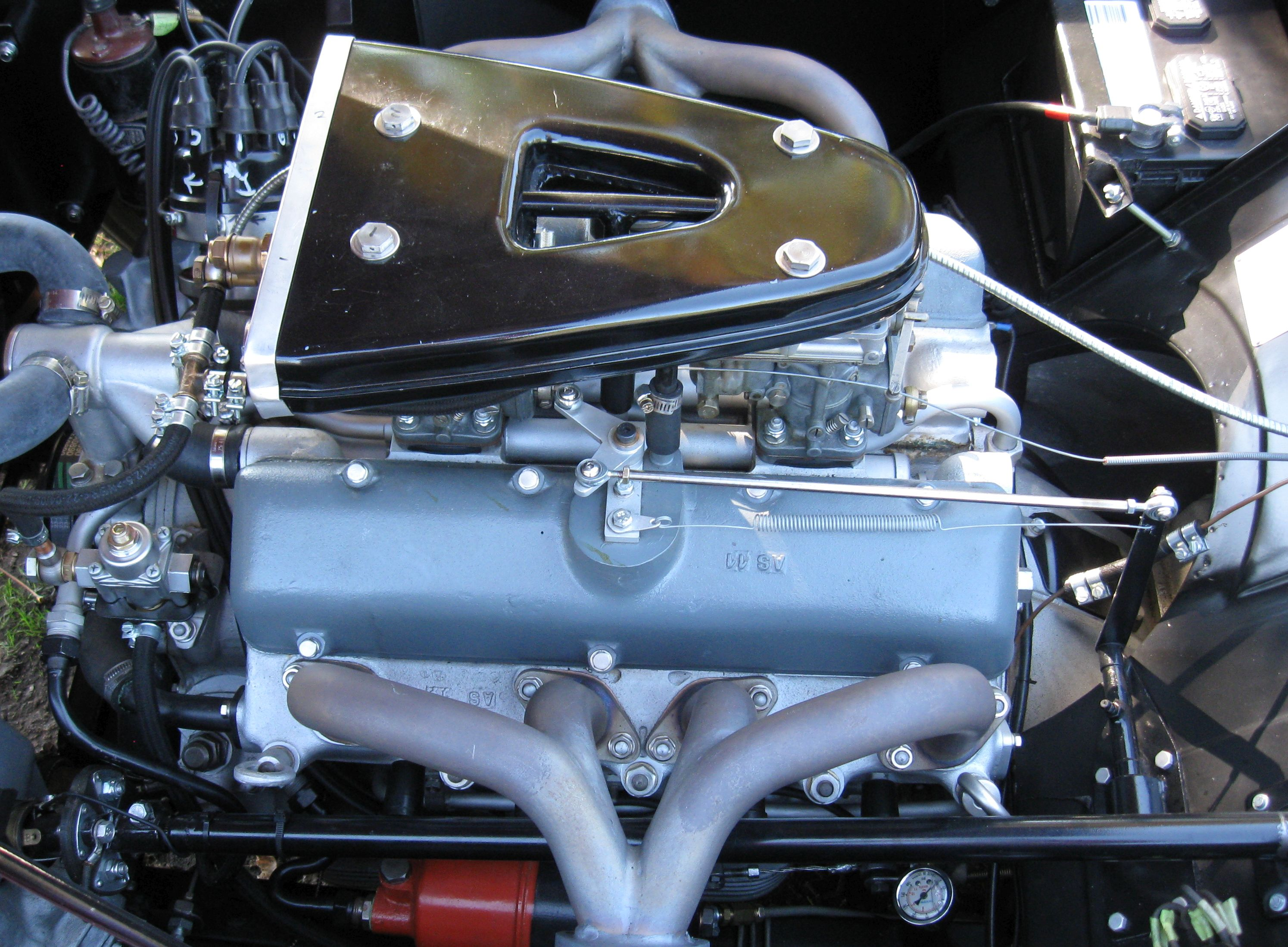
The Fiat 2-liter V8 in a Siata 208
