= 208 BC =

208 BC in various calendars
- Gregorian calendar: 208 BC; CCVIII BC
- Ab urbe condita: 546
- Ancient Egypt era: XXXIII dynasty, 116
- Pharaoh: Ptolemy IV Philopator, 14
- Ancient Greek Olympiad (summer): 143rd Olympiad (victor)¹
- Assyrian calendar: 4543
- Balinese saka calendar: N/A
- Bengali calendar: −801 – −800
- Berber calendar: 743
- Buddhist calendar: 337
- Burmese calendar: −845
- Byzantine calendar: 5301–5302
- Chinese calendar: 壬辰年 (Water Dragon); 2490 or 2283 — to — 癸巳年 (Water Snake); 2491 or 2284
- Coptic calendar: −491 – −490
- Discordian calendar: 959
- Ethiopian calendar: −215 – −214
- Hebrew calendar: 3553–3554
- Hindu calendars
- Vikram Samvat: −151 – −150
- Shaka Samvat: N/A
- Kali Yuga: 2893–2894
- Holocene calendar: 9793
- Iranian calendar: 829 BP – 828 BP
- Islamic calendar: 854 BH – 853 BH
- Javanese calendar: N/A
- Julian calendar: N/A
- Korean calendar: 2126
- Minguo calendar: 2119 before ROC 民前2119年
- Nanakshahi calendar: −1675
- Seleucid era: 104/105 AG
- Thai solar calendar: 335–336
- Tibetan calendar: ཆུ་ཕོ་འབྲུག་ལོ་ (male Water-Dragon) −81 or −462 or −1234 — to — ཆུ་མོ་སྦྲུལ་ལོ་ (female Water-Snake) −80 or −461 or −1233

Year 208 BC was a year of the pre-Julian Roman calendar. At the time it was known as the Year of the Consulship of Marcellus and Crispinus (or, less frequently, year 546 Ab urbe condita). The denomination 208 BC for this year has been used since the early medieval period, when the Anno Domini calendar era became the prevalent method in Europe for naming years.

== Events ==
=== By place ===
==== Roman Republic ====
- The Romans under Publius Cornelius Scipio defeat the Carthaginians under their commander Hasdrubal Barca at Baecula (Bailen) in Baetica. As a result, Hasdrubal Barca decides to cross the Pyrenees with his remaining troops into Transalpine Gaul, with the intention of joining his brother Hannibal in Italy.
- The Roman general Marcus Claudius Marcellus is killed in battle while fighting Hannibal near Venusia, Apulia.
- Hannibal destroys a Roman force at the Battle of Petelia.

==== Seleucid Empire ====
- Antiochus III advances into Bactria, which is ruled by the Greco-Bactrian king Euthydemus I, and defeats Euthydemus at the Battle of the Arius. After resisting a siege of his capital Bactra (Balkh) by the Seleucids, Euthydemus obtains an honourable peace by which Antiochus promises Euthydemus' son Demetrius the hand of one of his daughters.

==== China ====
- Zhang Han defeats and kills the rebel leader Xiang Liang in the Battle of Dingtao.
- Qin Prime Minister Li Si is executed by Qin Er Shi, having been conspired against by the eunuch Zhao Gao, who replaces him as Prime Minister.
- Zhang Han seizes the Zhao capital Handan and besieges its king Zhao Xie in Julu.
- Xiang Liang's nephew Xiang Yu seizes control of Liang's army.

== Births ==
- Liu Ruyi, Chinese prince and only son of the first Han emperor Liu Bang (d. 194 BC)
- Polybius, Greek historian, famous for his book called "The Histories" or "The Rise of the Roman Empire", covering in detail the period between 220 and 146 BC (d. 120 BC)

== Deaths ==
- Marcus Claudius Marcellus, Roman general who has captured Syracuse during the Second Punic War and has become known as "the sword of Rome" (b. 268 BC)
- Li Si, Chinese philosopher and politician (assassinated) (b. 280 BC)
