= Stabilimenti Farina =

Italian automotive coachbuilder (1906–1953)

Stabilimenti Industriali Farina
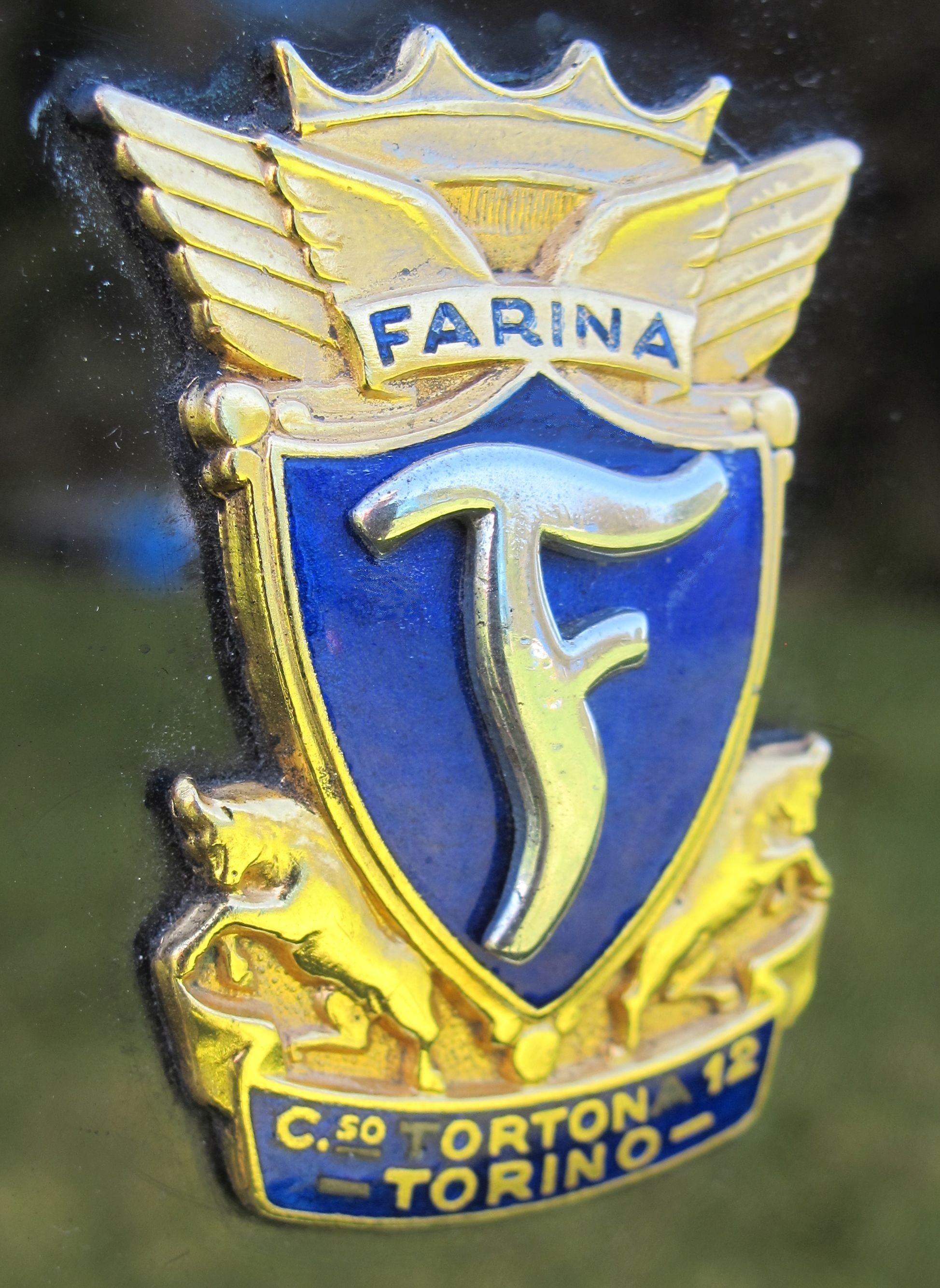
- Industry: Automotive
- Founded: 1906, Turin, Italy
- Founders: Giovanni Carlo Farina
- Headquarters: Turin, Italy
- Services: Automotive design, coachbuilding

Stabilimenti Industriali Farina was an Italian automotive coachbuilder in Turin. It was established by Giovanni Carlo Farina (1884–1957) in 12 Corso Tortona in 1906. It was closed in 1953.

Among famous employees was his brother Battista Farina, who was here from the start in 1906 to 1928 before he in 1930 established what became Pininfarina. Pietro Frua worked here from 1928 to 1939 before starting his own company. Up until 1930, Felice Mario Boano was here and Giovanni Michelotti started his career with Farina in the mid-1930s. Also, Franco Martinengo and Alfredo Vignale were employed by Stabilimenti at the early stages of their careers.

Before World War II, it did some Lancia Artena and Alfa Romeo 6C. The founder retired in 1948, and the firm was run by his son Attilia Farina (1908–93). At this time they made Fiat 1100/Fiat 1500 and the quite similar Simca 8. In 1950 Attili's brother Giuseppe Farina (1906–1966) became the first world champion in Formula 1.

Stabilimenti Farina closed in 1953. Among the later builds were four Jowett Jupiters, ten Ferrari 166 (some by Michelotti) and a Ferrari 212, before Ferrari in 1952 started its collaboration with Battista's Pininfarina.

== Gallery ==
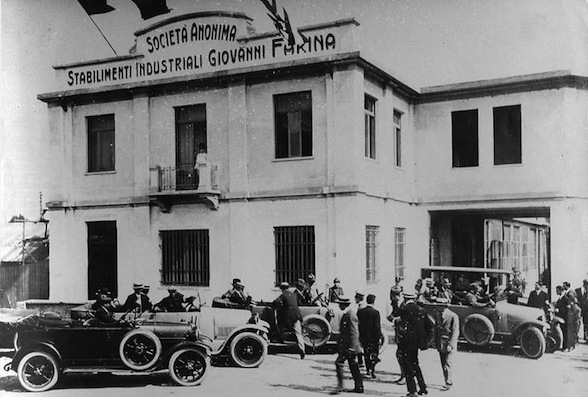
12 Corso Tortona

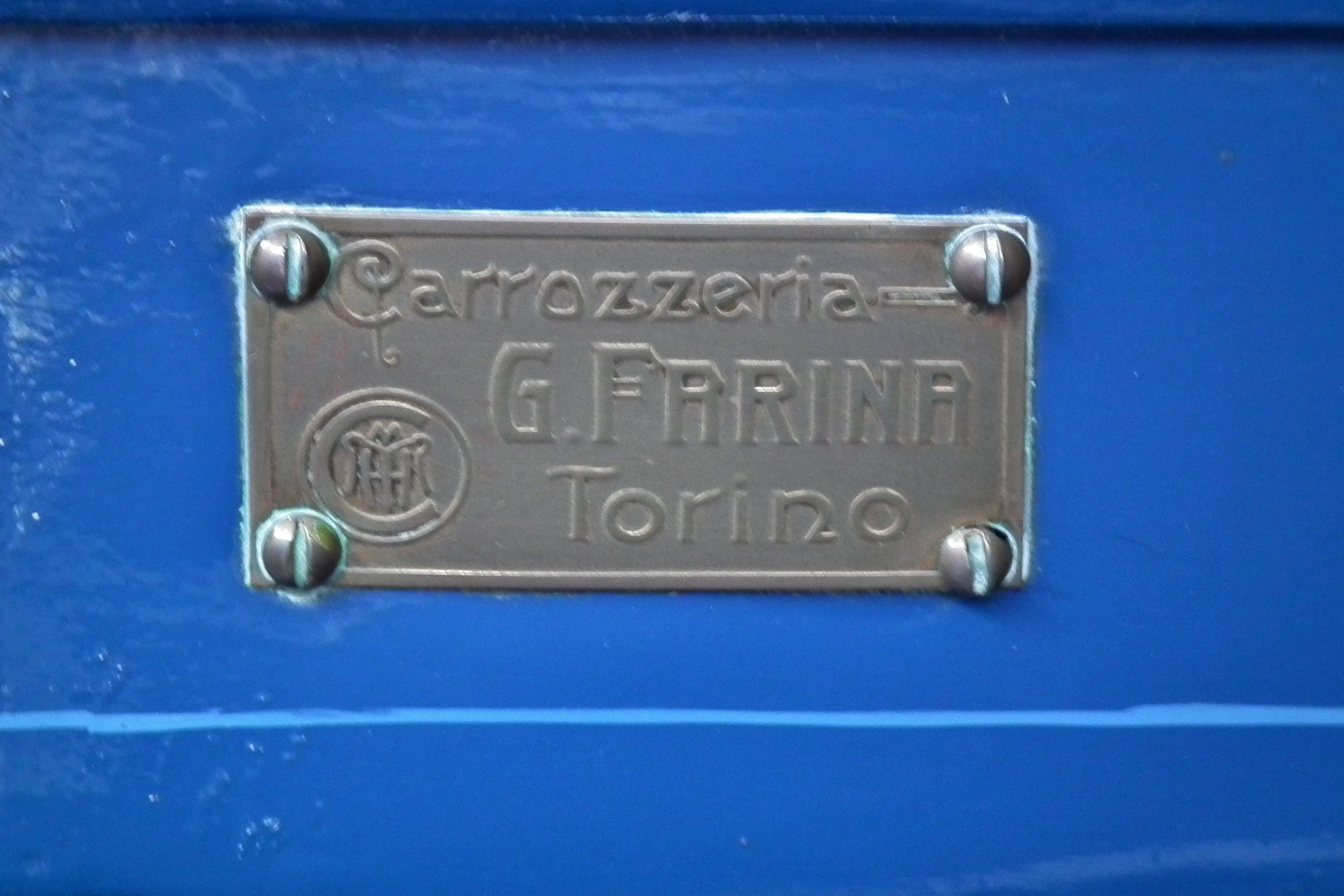
Plaque on 1913 Fiat Zero

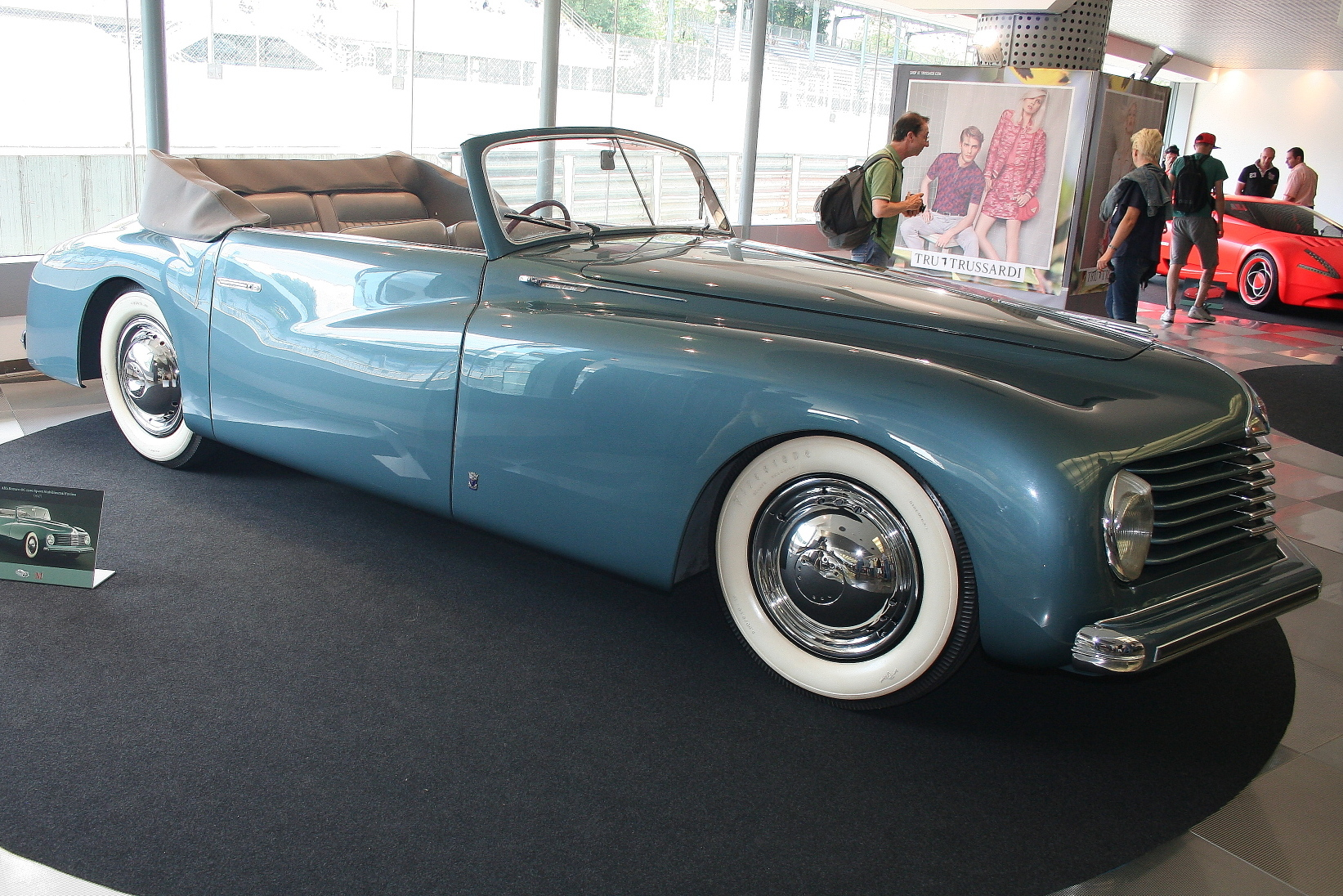
1947 Alfa Romeo 6C 2500 SS Cabriolet designed by Giovanni Michelotti and built by Farina

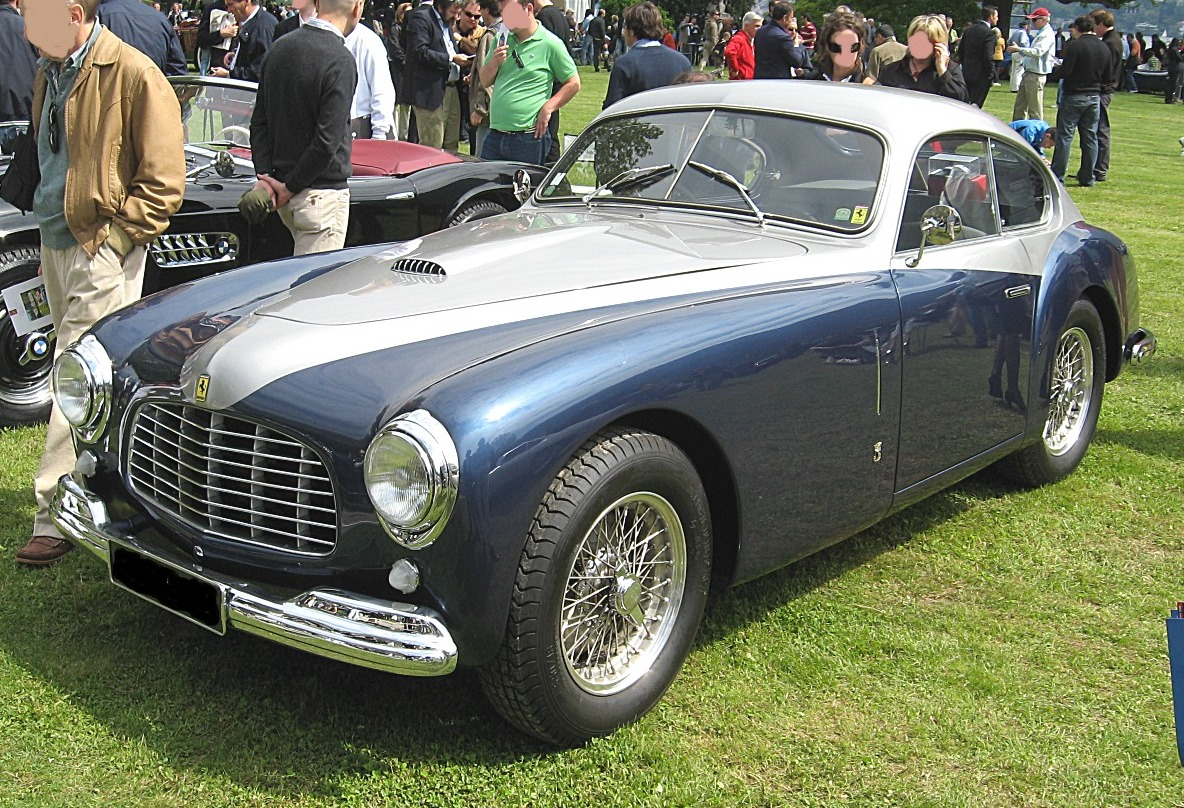
1949 Ferrari 166 Inter Coupe by Farina

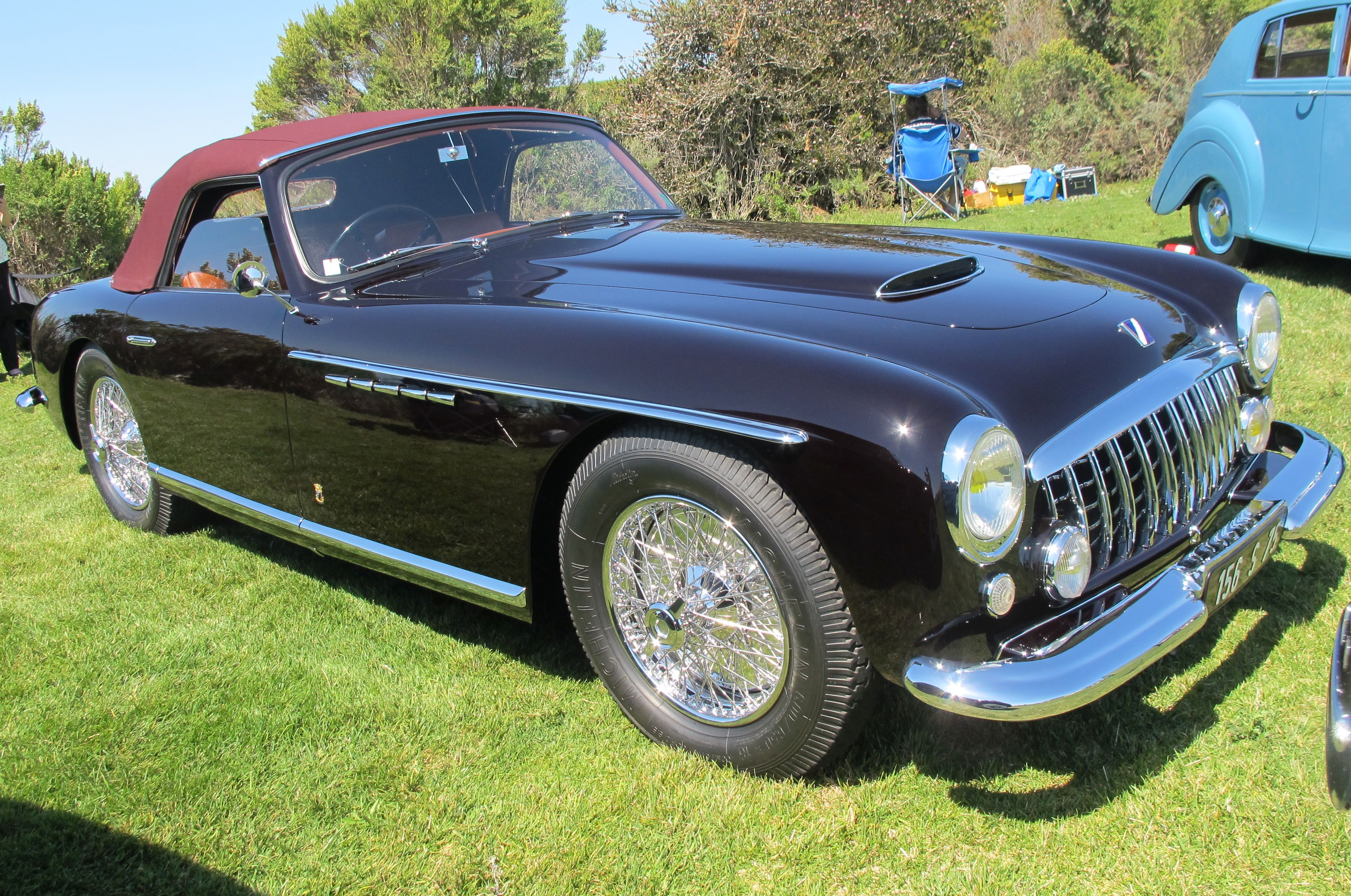
1951 Talbot-Lago T26 Gran Sport Cabriolet by Farina

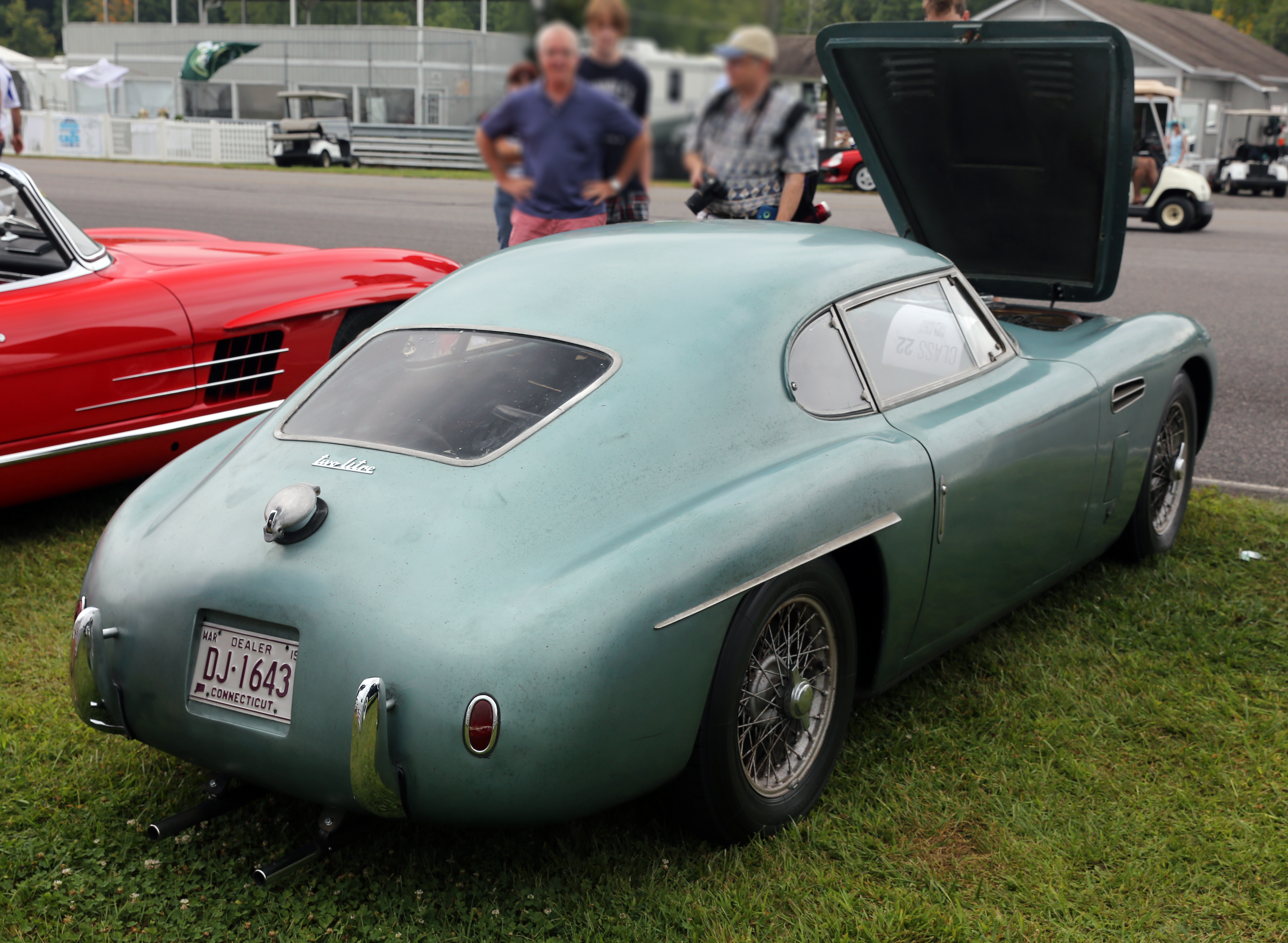
1953 Siata 208s by Farina
