= Giovanni Michelotti =

Italian designer (1921–1980)

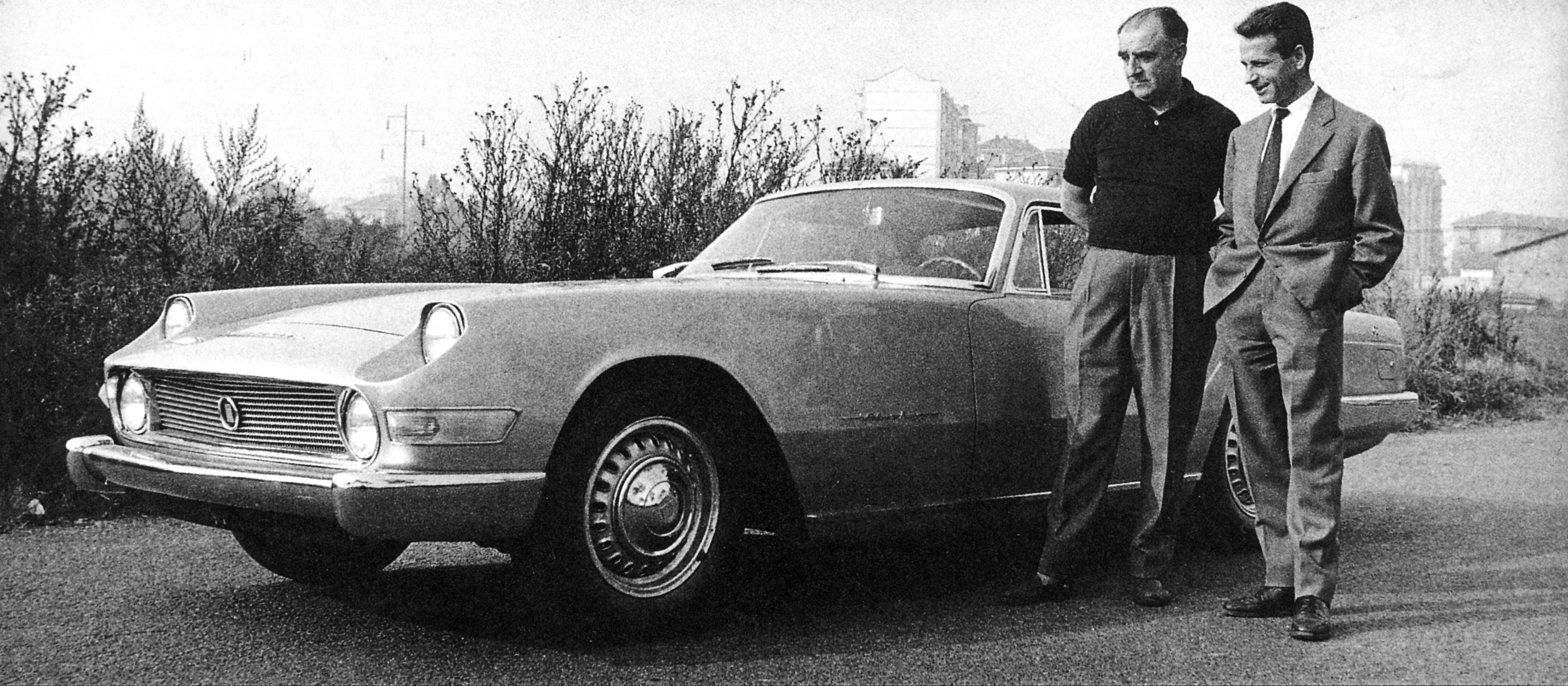
Michelotti at right, with Enrico Nardi and the 1960 Plymouth Silver Ray.

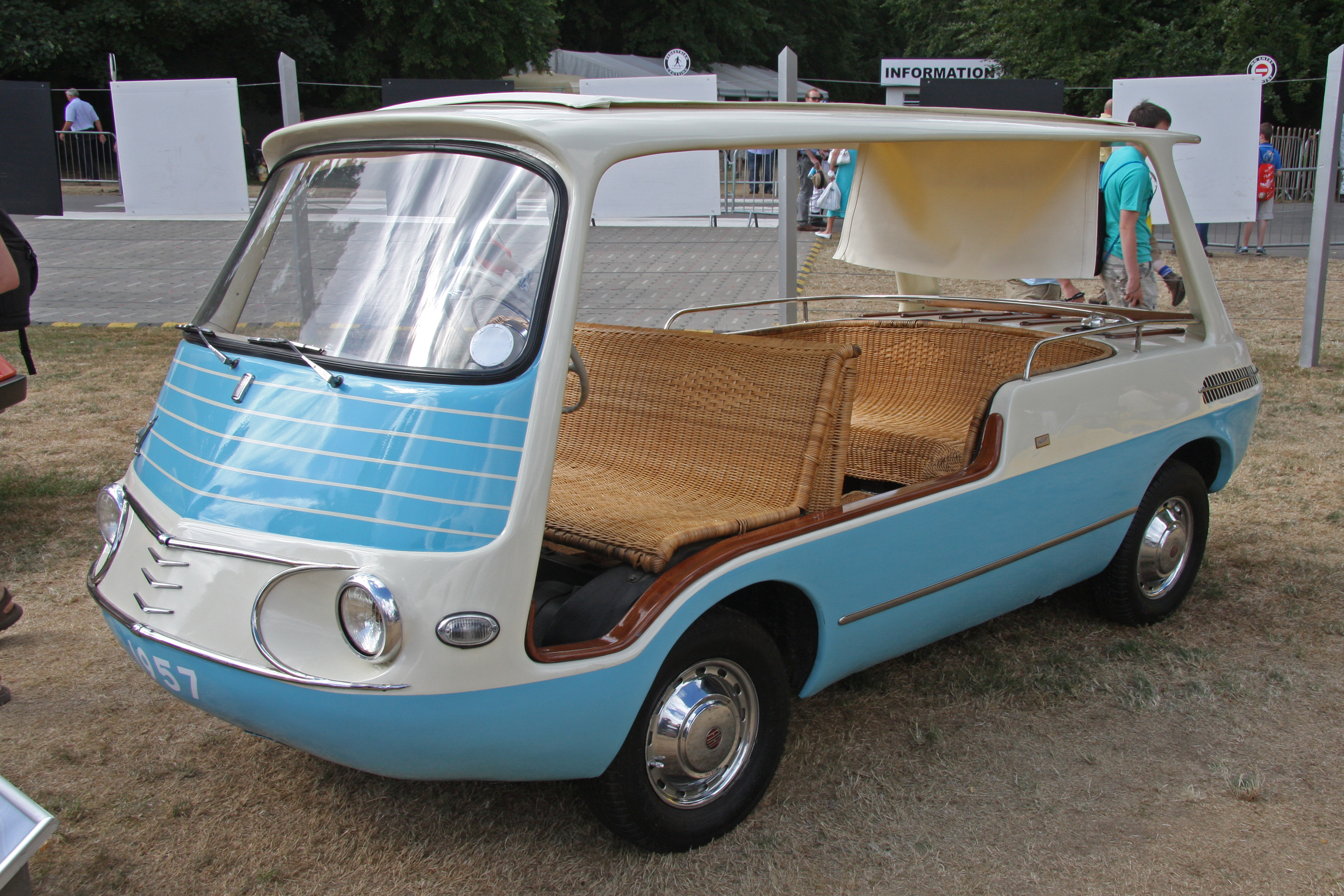
1957 Marinella, based on Fiat 600 Multipla, bodied by Fissore

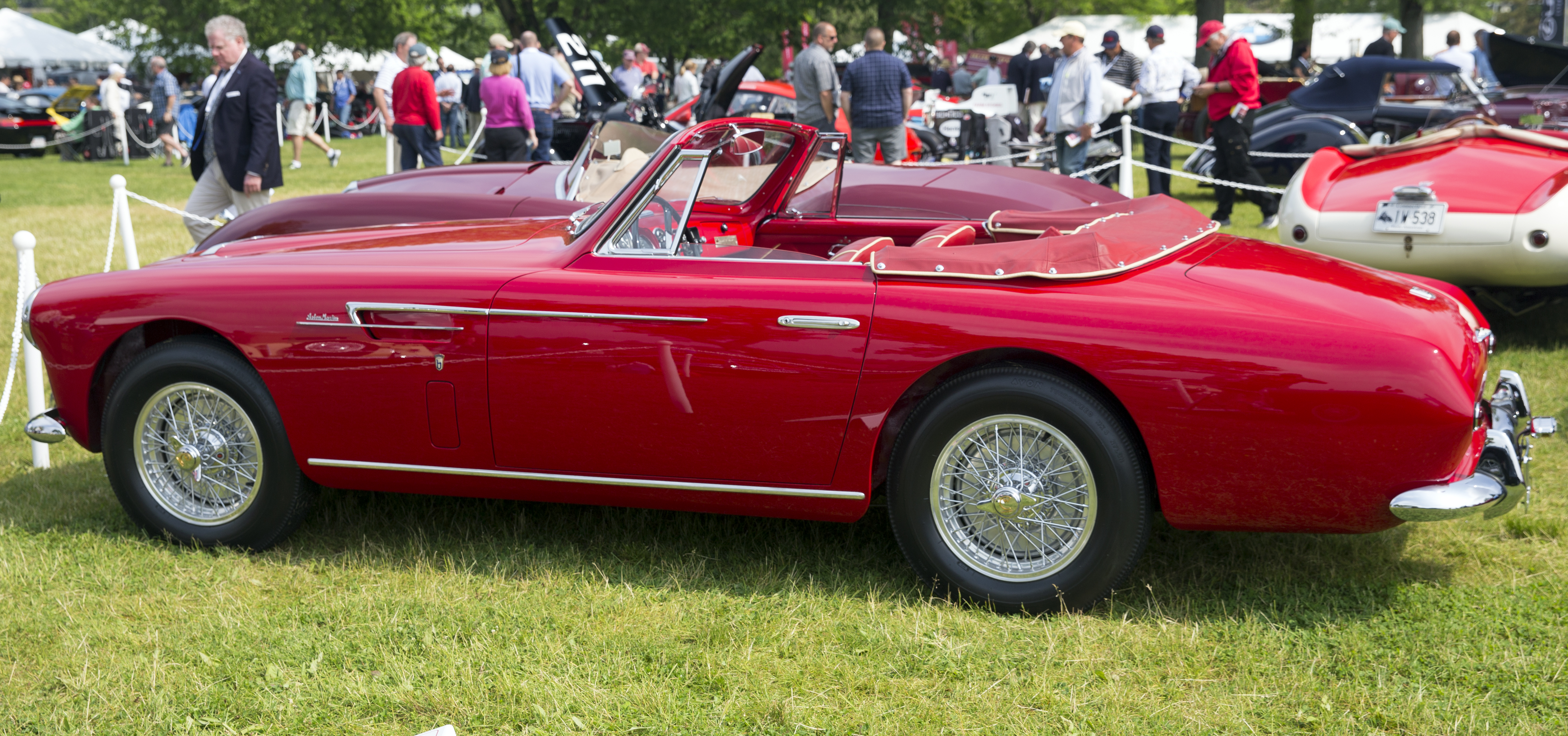
Aston Martin DB2/4 Bertone Drophead Coupé

Giovanni Michelotti (6 October 1921 – 23 January 1980) was one of the most prolific designers of sports cars in the 20th century. His notable contributions were for Ferrari, Lancia, Maserati and Triumph marques. He was also associated with truck designs for Leyland Motors, and with designs for British Leyland (including the Leyland National bus) after the merger of Leyland and BMC.

== Early life and career ==
Born in Turin, Italy, Michelotti worked for coachbuilders, including Stabilimenti Farina, Vignale, Allemano, Bertone, Ghia, Ghia-Aigle, Scioneri, Monterosa, Viotti, Fissore and OSI, before opening his own design studio in 1959. He also cooperated with manufacturers producing their own cars based on Fiat or other mechanicals, like Siata, Moretti, Francis Lombardi and Nardi. From 1962, Michelotti concluded cooperation with Carrozzeria Vignale and began his own coachbuilding activities.

== Personal life ==
Towards the end of his life, asked whether he had ever designed anything other than cars, Michelotti acknowledged that virtually all of his design work had involved cars, but he admitted to having designed a coffee making machine shortly after the war.

== Alfa Romeo ==
- Alfa Romeo 6C 2500 SS Coupè and Cabriolet for Stabilimenti Farina
- Alfa Romeo 1900 La Fleche Spider and Coupé for Vignale; Coupè and Spider for Ghia; Lugano Coupé and Spider for Ghia-Aigle
- Alfa Romeo 2000 Vignale Coupé, Ghia-Aigle Coupé and Cabriolet
- Alfa Romeo Giulietta Sprint Veloce Michelotti Goccia, 1961
- Alfa Romeo 2600 Berlina De Luxe for OSI
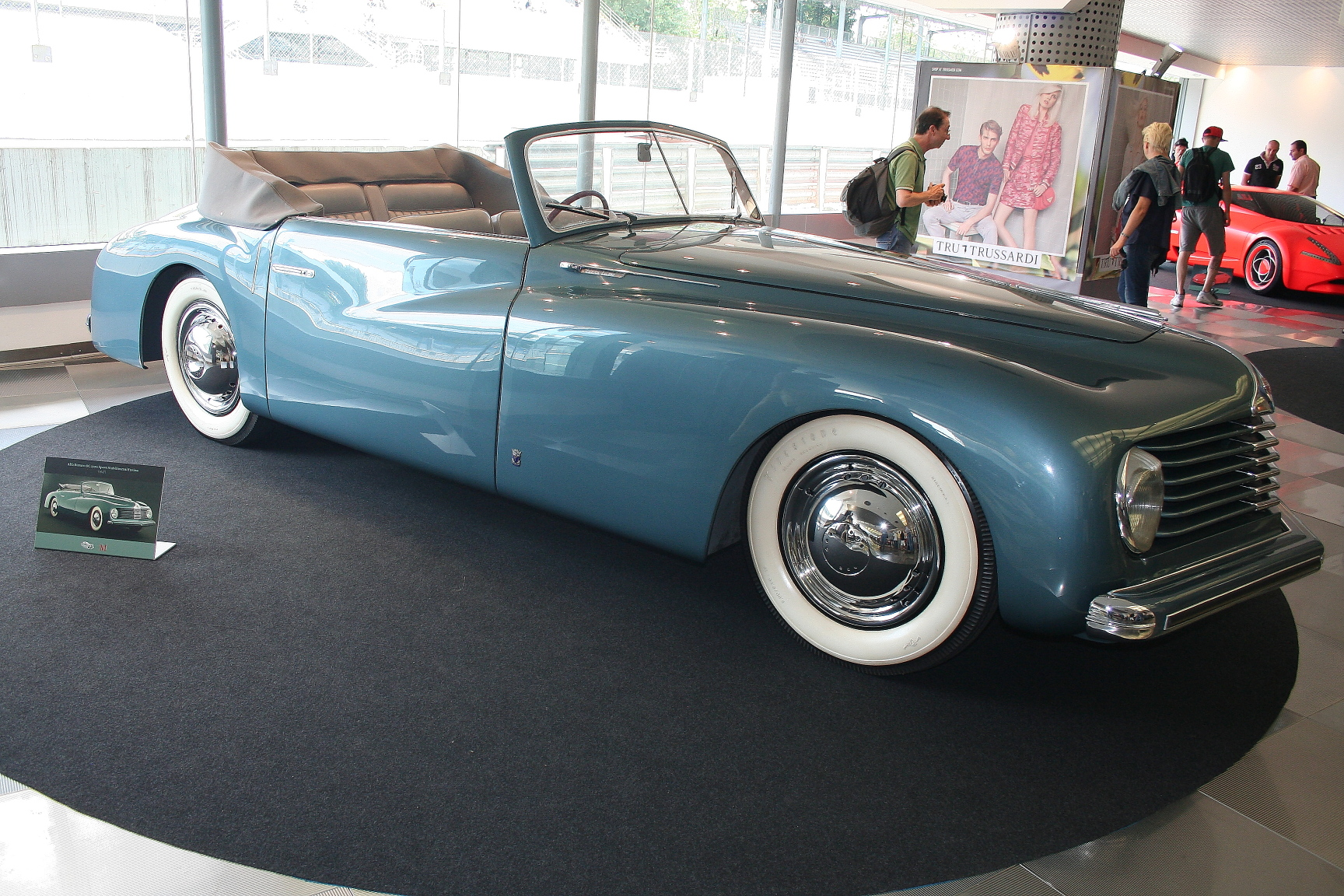
1947 Alfa Romeo 6C 2500 SS Stabilimenti Farina Cabriolet

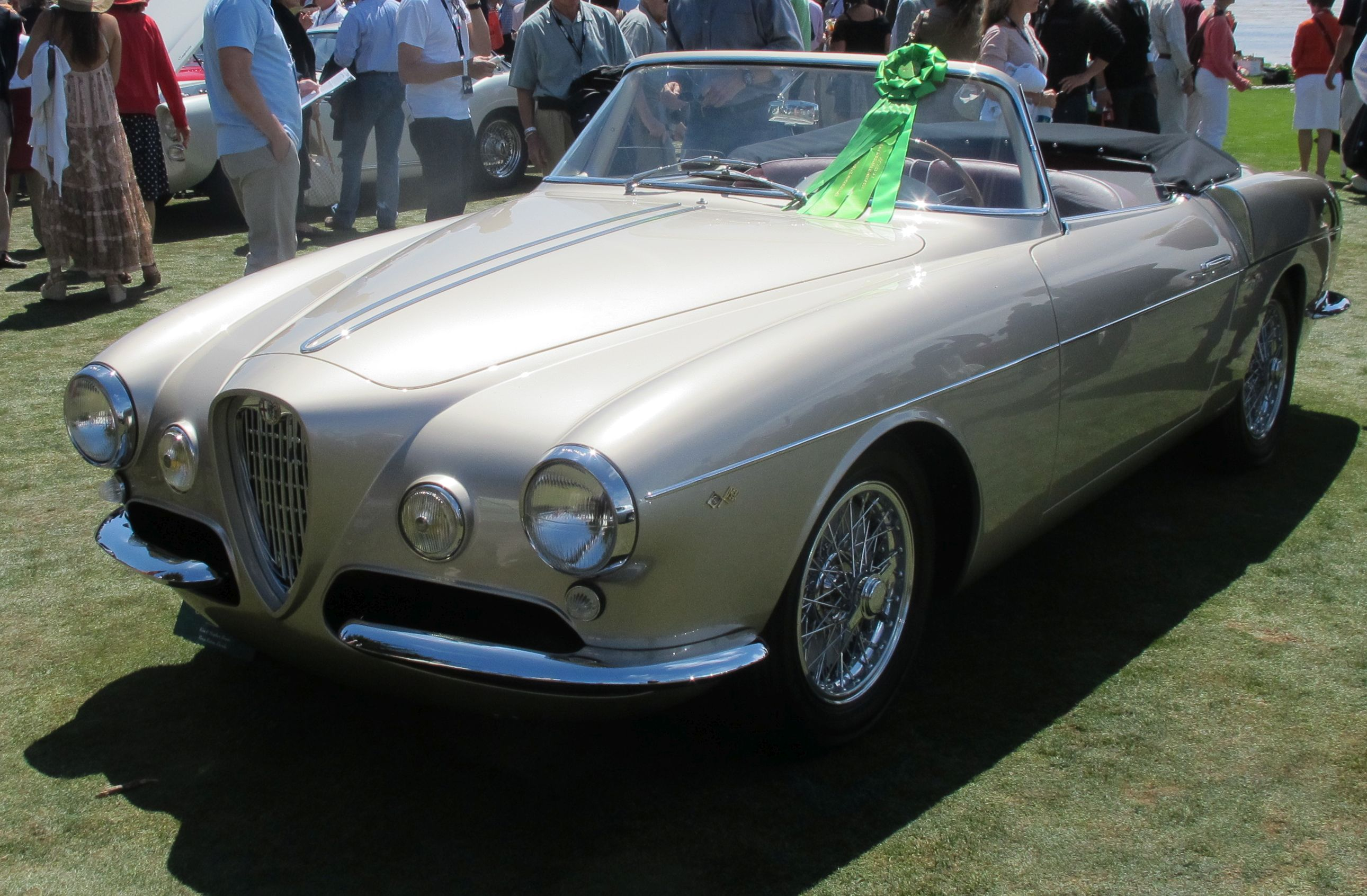
1955 Alfa Romeo 1900C SS Ghia-Aigle Cabriolet

== Lancia ==
- Lancia Astura Stabilimenti Farina Coupé, 1946; Cabriolet, 1947
- Lancia Aprilia Berlina Gran Lusso and Cabriolet for Stabilimenti Farina, 1947; Coupé for Vignale, 1949
- Lancia Aurelia B50 Vignale Coupé; B52 Vignale Coupé, Bertone Coupé, Balbo Coupé 2+2; B53 Allemano Coupé
- Lancia Aurelia Nardi Blue Ray 1 and 2, for Vignale, commissioned by Enrico Nardi
- Lancia Appia Allemano Coupé; Cabriolet, 1957; Lusso Coupé, prototype and series production cars for Vignale
- Lancia Flavia Vignale Cabriolet, would become the last Michelotti design for Vignale.
- Lancia Mizar concept, 1974, based on Beta featuring four gull-wing doors
- Lancia Beta Carrera, 1975 for Felber
- Lancia Beta Felber FF, 1976
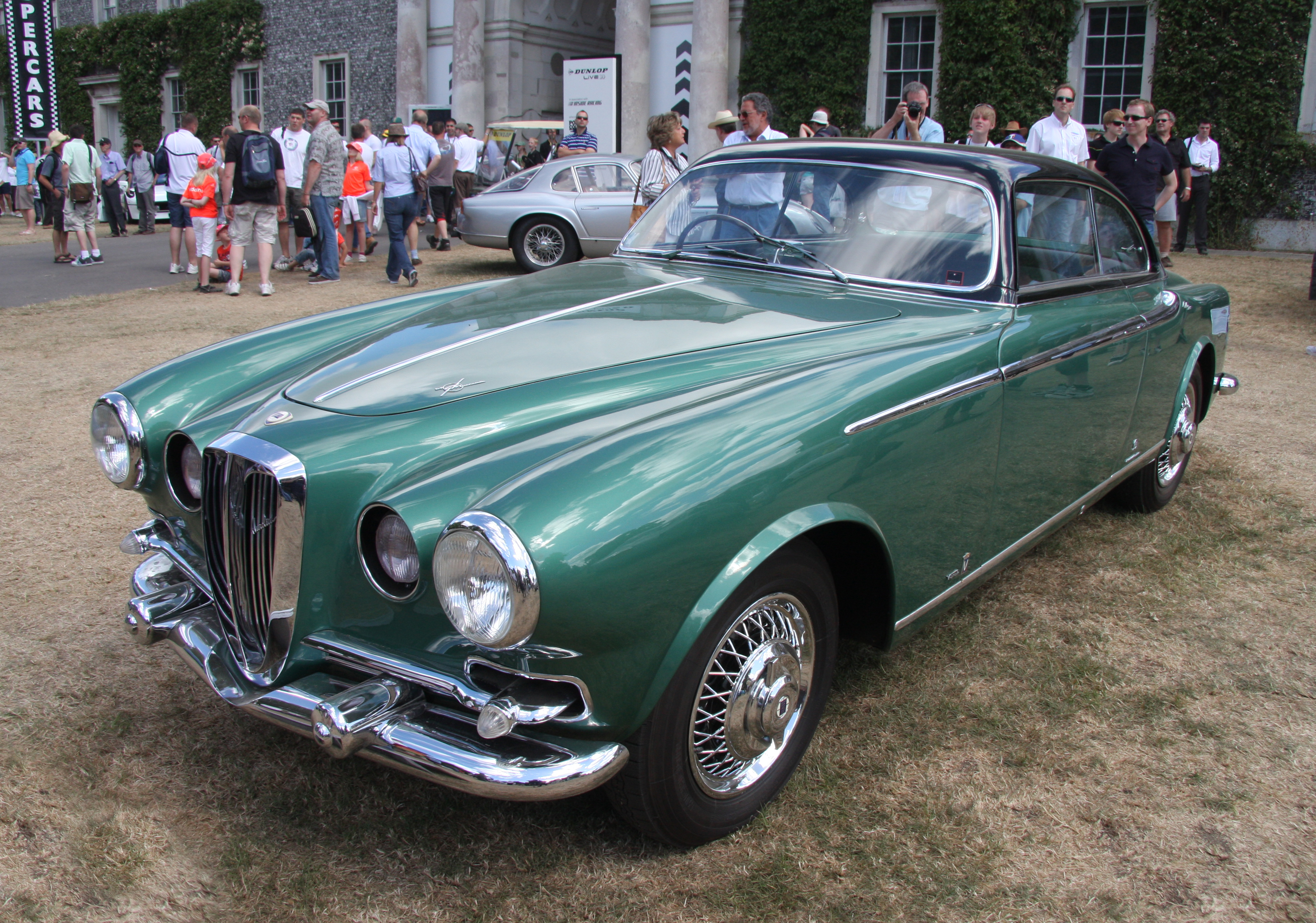
Lancia Aurelia B52

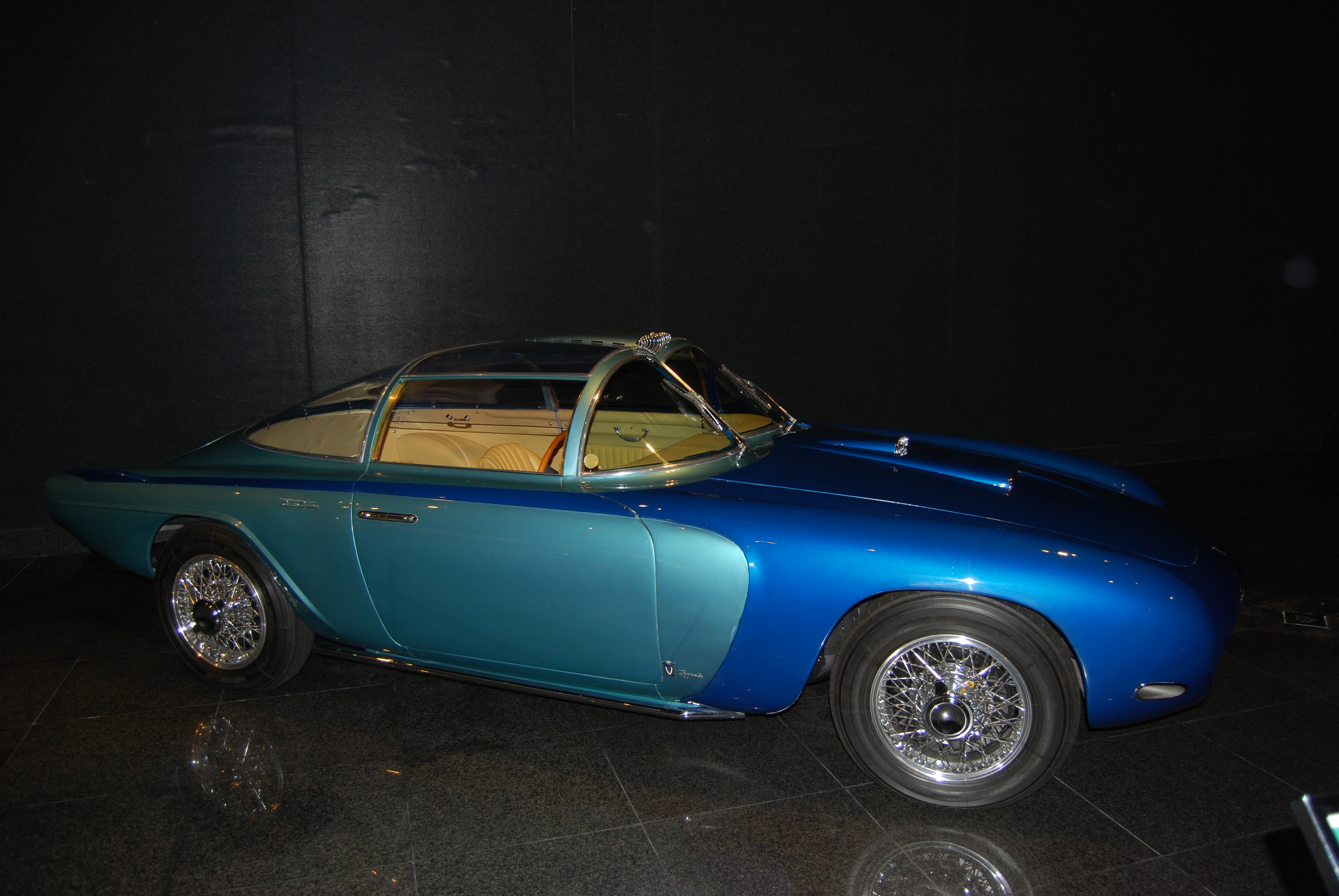
Aurelia-based Nardi Blue Ray 1

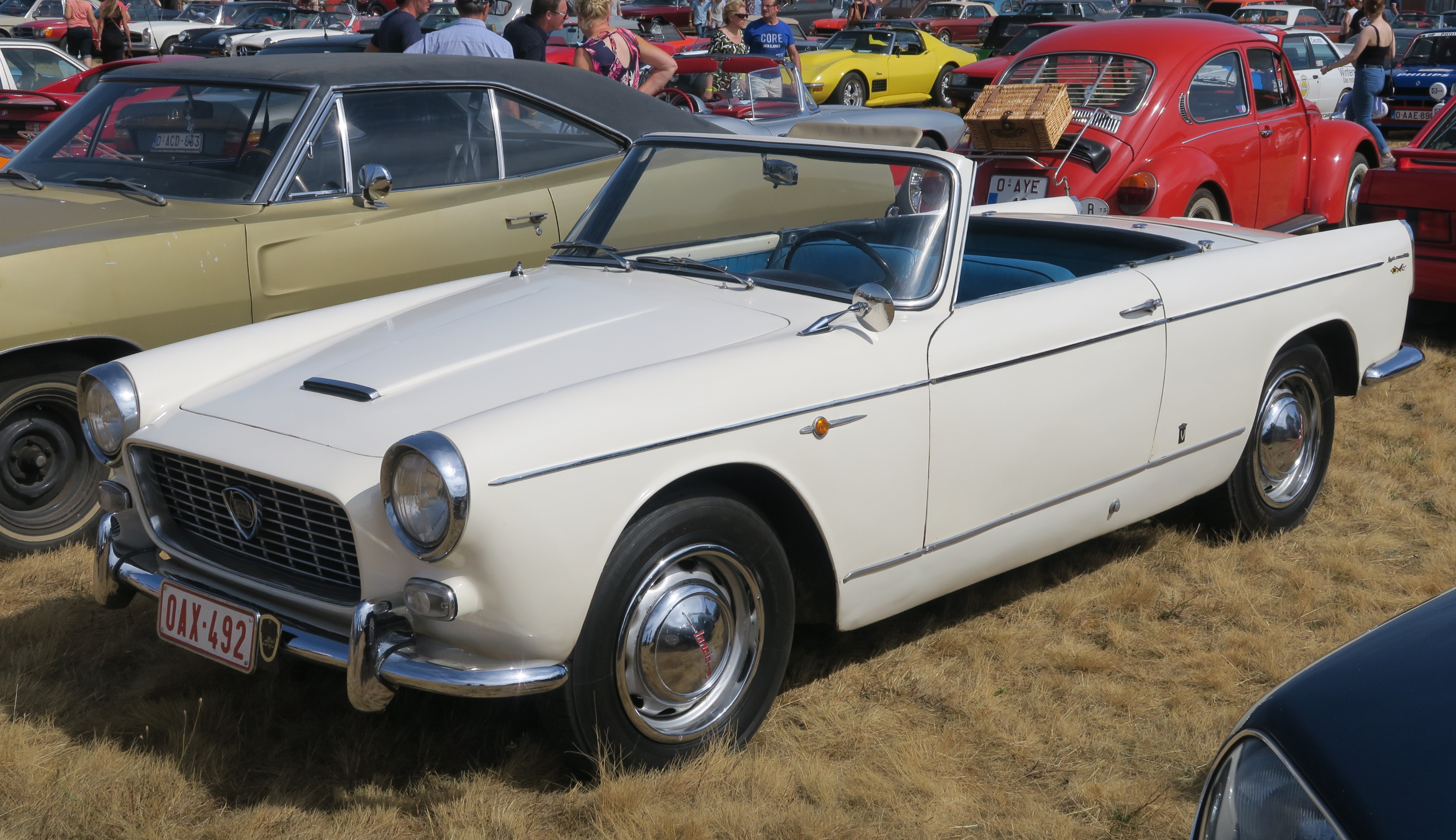
Lancia Appia Cabriolet

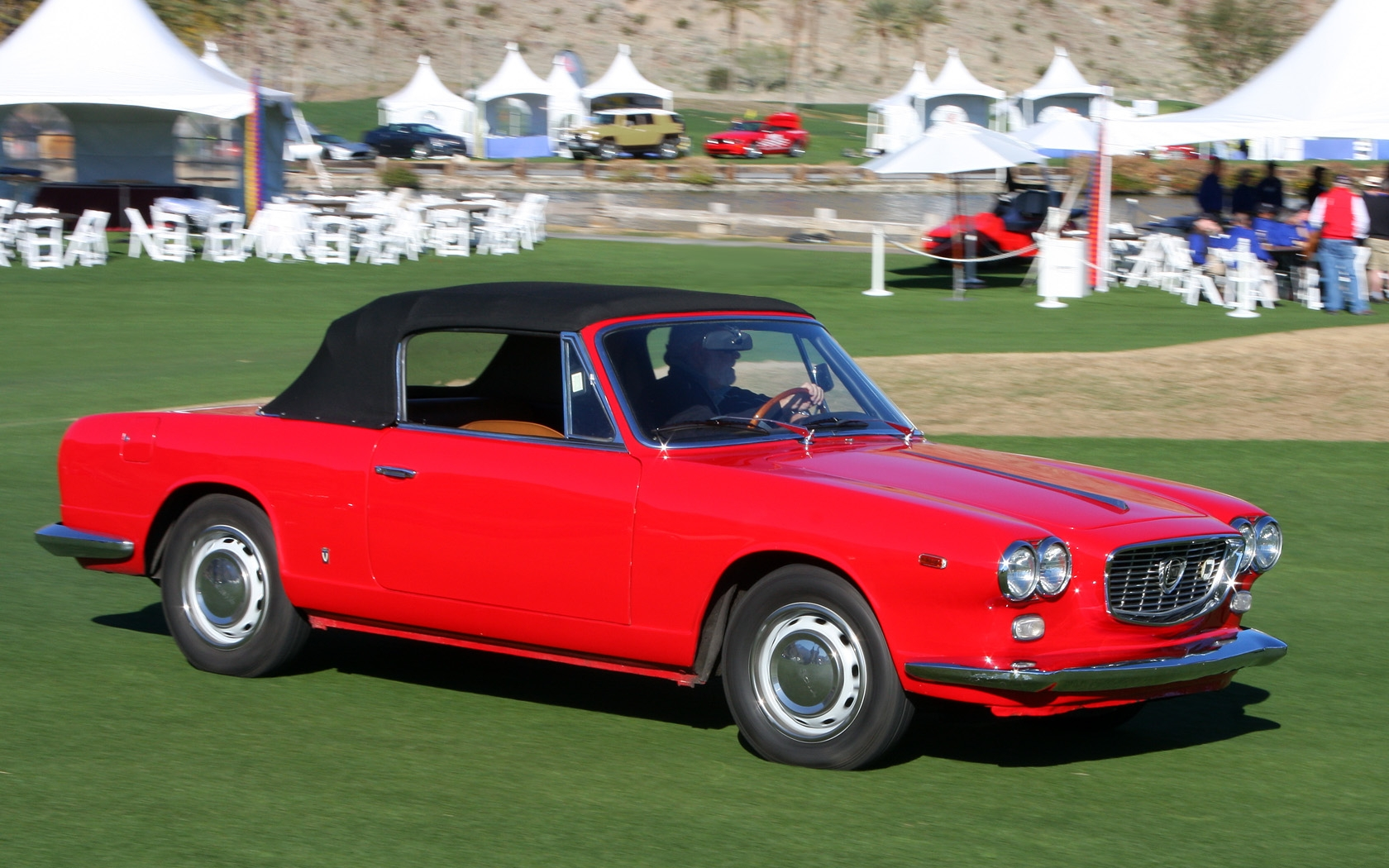
Lancia Flavia Vignale Cabriolet

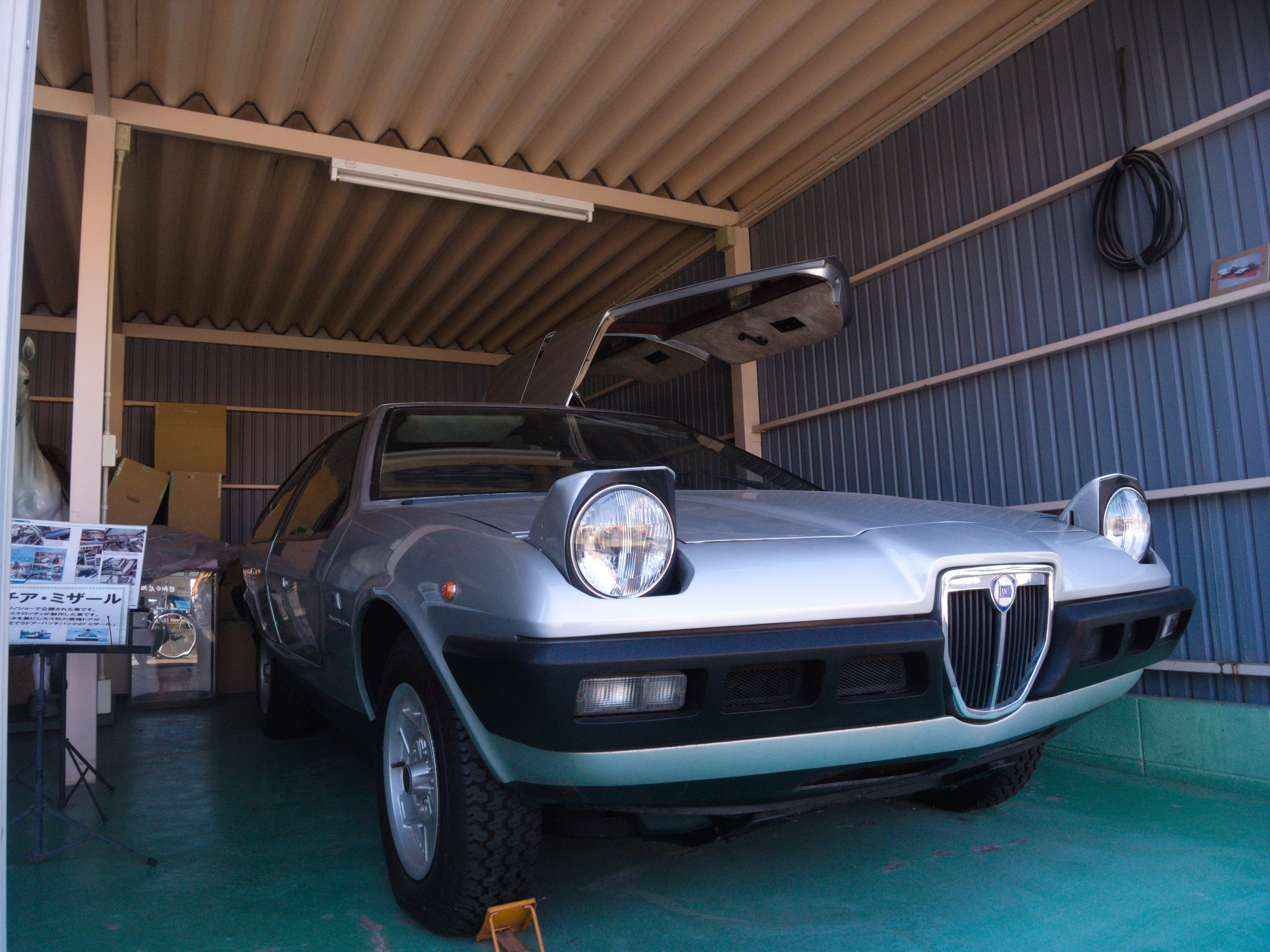
Lancia Mizar concept

== Ferrari ==
- Ferrari 166 MM Coupé and Spider for Vignale
- Ferrari 166 Inter Coupé and Cabriolet for Stabilimenti Farina; Coupé for Ghia; Coupé for Vignale
- Ferrari 212 Export Barchetta, Spider, Cabriolet and Coupé for Vignale
- Ferrari 212 Inter Coupé, Spider and Cabriolet for Ghia; Coupé, Spider and Cabriolet for Vignale; Coupé for Ghia-Aigle
- Ferrari 225 S Coupé and Spider for Vignale
- Ferrari 250 S Coupé for Vignale
- Ferrari 250 MM Coupé and Spider for Vignale
- Ferrari 250 Europa Coupé and Spider for Vignale
- Ferrari 250 Europa GT Coupé for Vignale
- Ferrari 340 America Coupé and 2+2 Coupé for Ghia; Coupé and Spider for Vignale
- Ferrari 340 Mexico Coupé and Spider for Vignale
- Ferrari 340 MM Spider for Vignale (one later uprated to 375 MM spec)
- Ferrari 342 America Cabriolet for Vignale
- Ferrari 625 TF Coupé and Spider for Vignale
- Ferrari 375 MM Coupé for Ghia
- Ferrari 375 America Coupé for Vignale
- Ferrari 330 GT Michelotti Coupé
- Ferrari 275 P2 Speciale (1968 re-body of an existing 1963 250 P, converted to 275 P and 330 P specification, commissioned by Luigi "Coco" Chinetti Jr. and Robert Peak)
- Ferrari 365 GTC/4 Beach Car for Felber, 1976
- Ferrari 400i Meera S, 1983
- Ferrari 365 GTB/4 Michelotti N.A.R.T. Spider (re-body of an existing Ferrari 365 GTB/4 commissioned by Luigi Chinetti, 4 built for road use)
- Ferrari 365 GTB/4 Michelotti N.A.R.T. Spider Competizione (re-body of an existing Ferrari 365 GTB/4 commissioned by Luigi Chinetti, 1 built for N.A.R.T.'s entry in the 1975 24 hours of Le Mans)
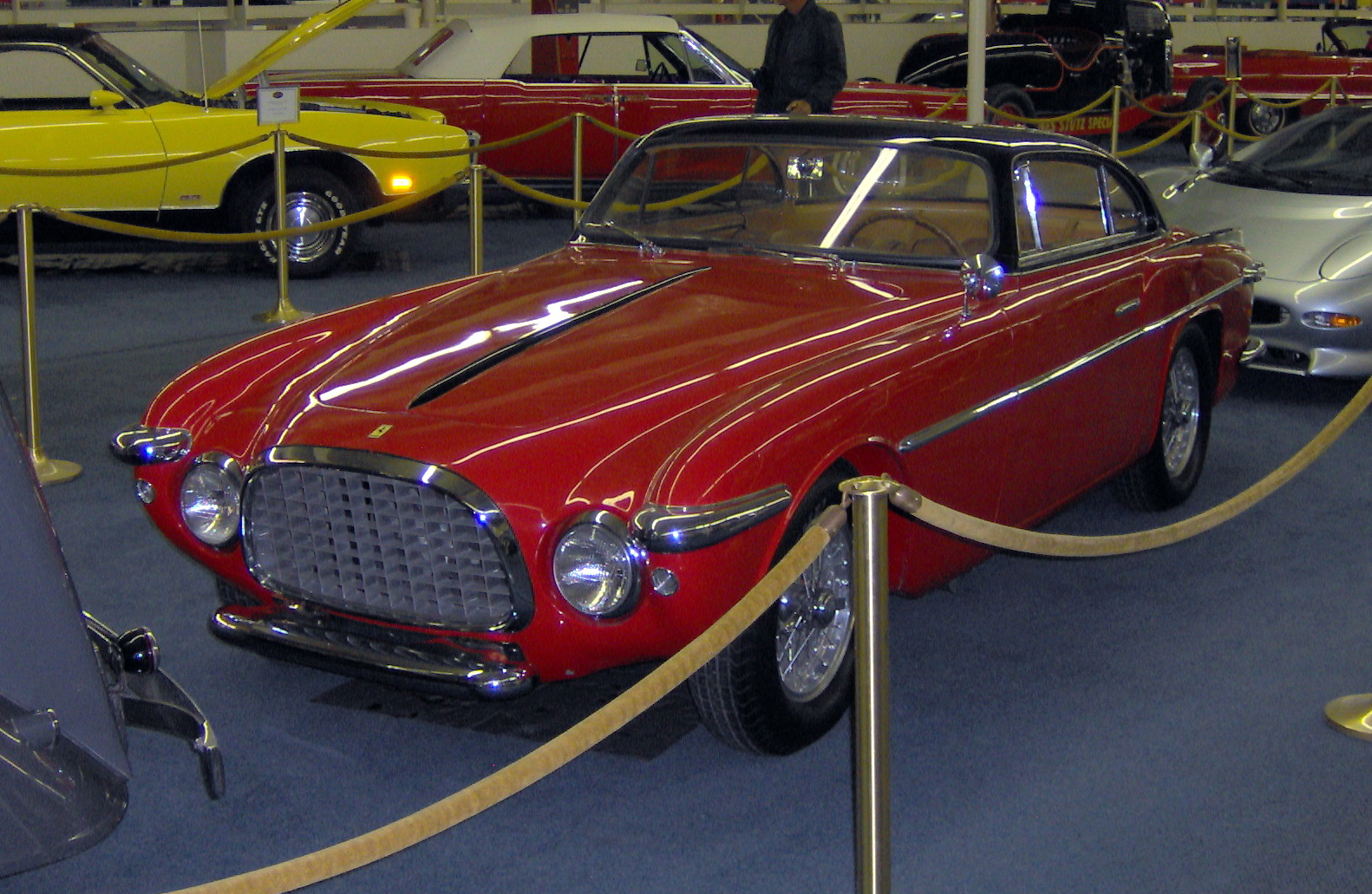
Ferrari 212 Inter Vignale Coupé

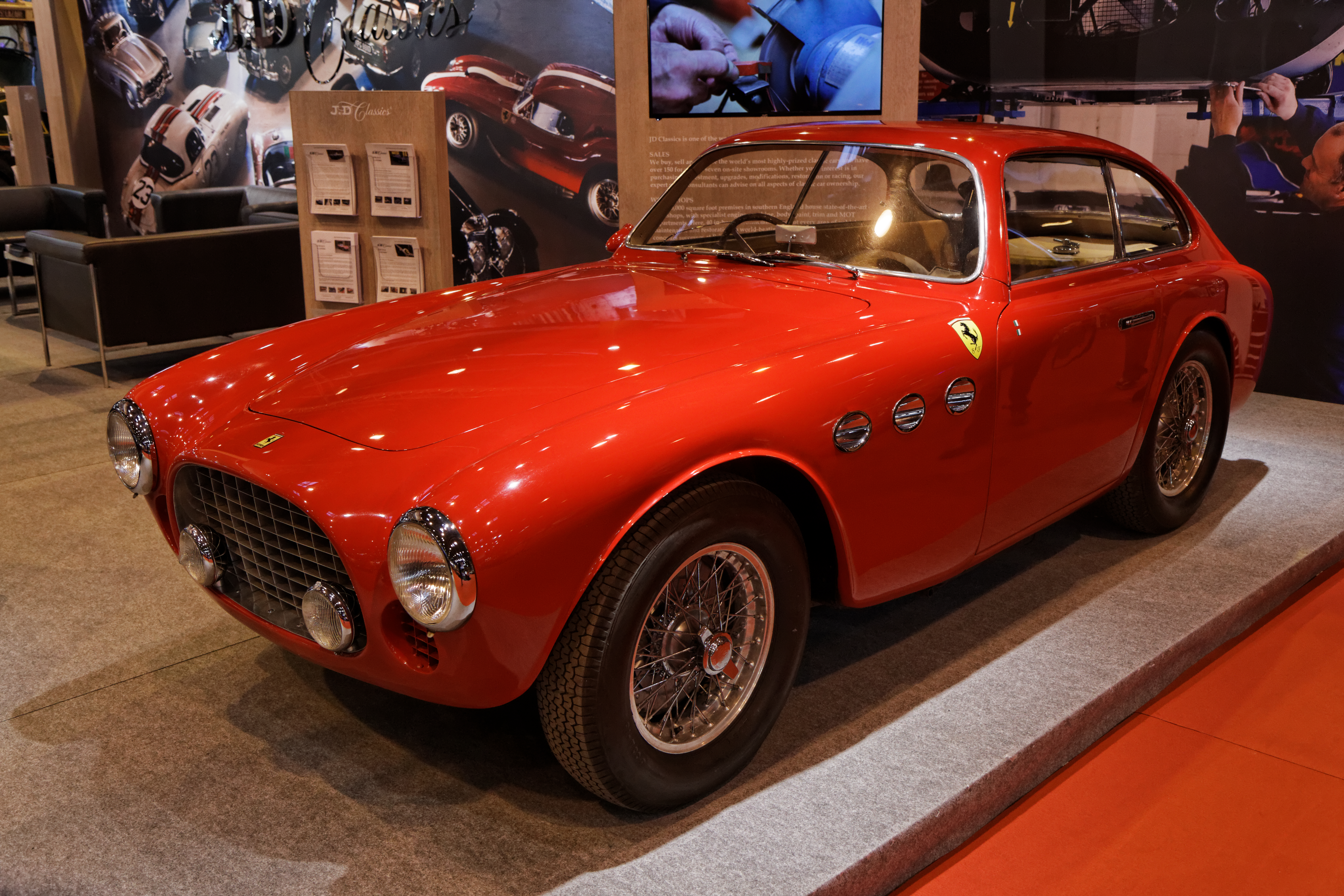
Ferrari 225 S Vignale Berlinetta

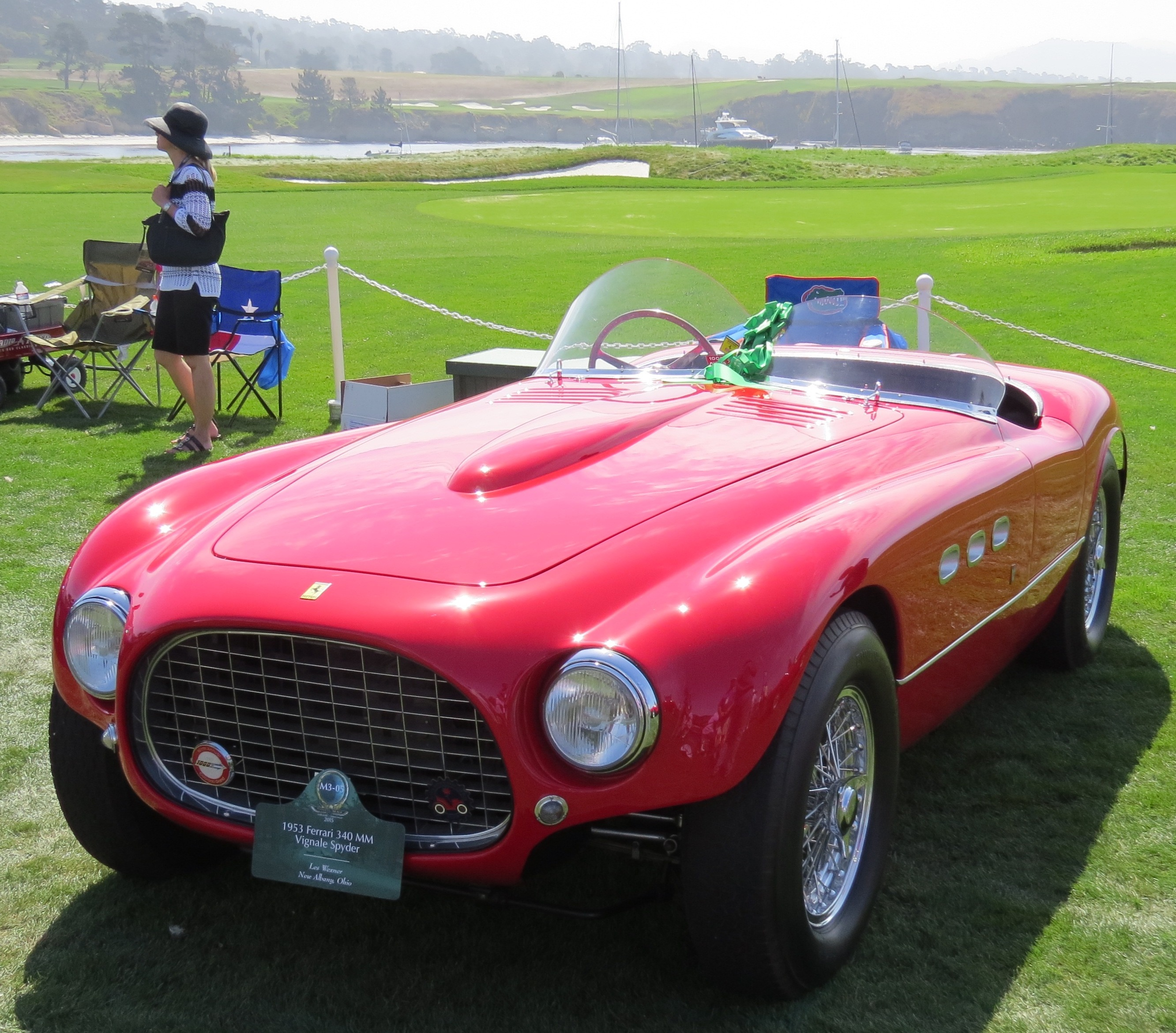
Ferrari 340 MM Vignale Spyder

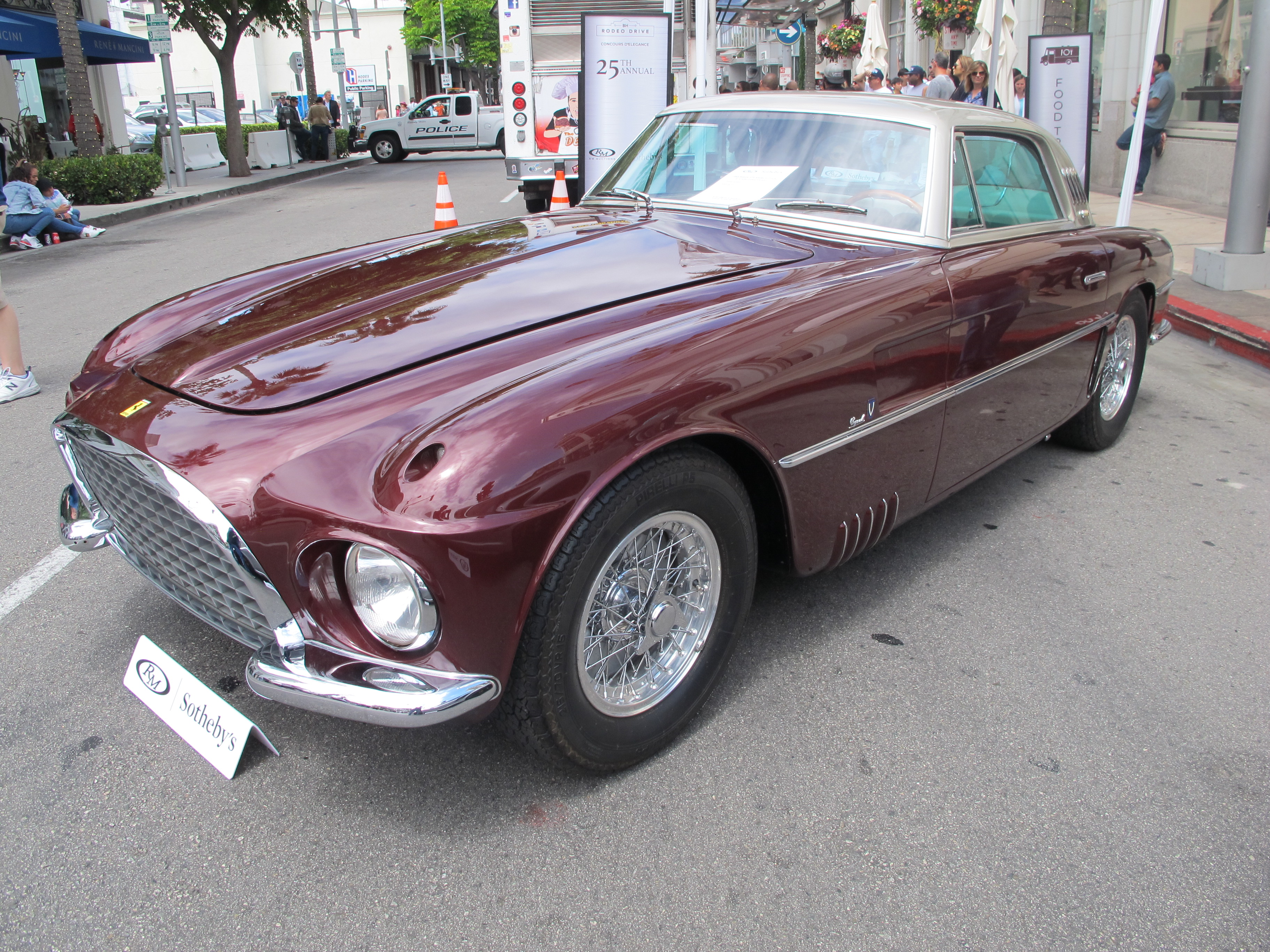
Ferrari 375 America Vignale Coupé

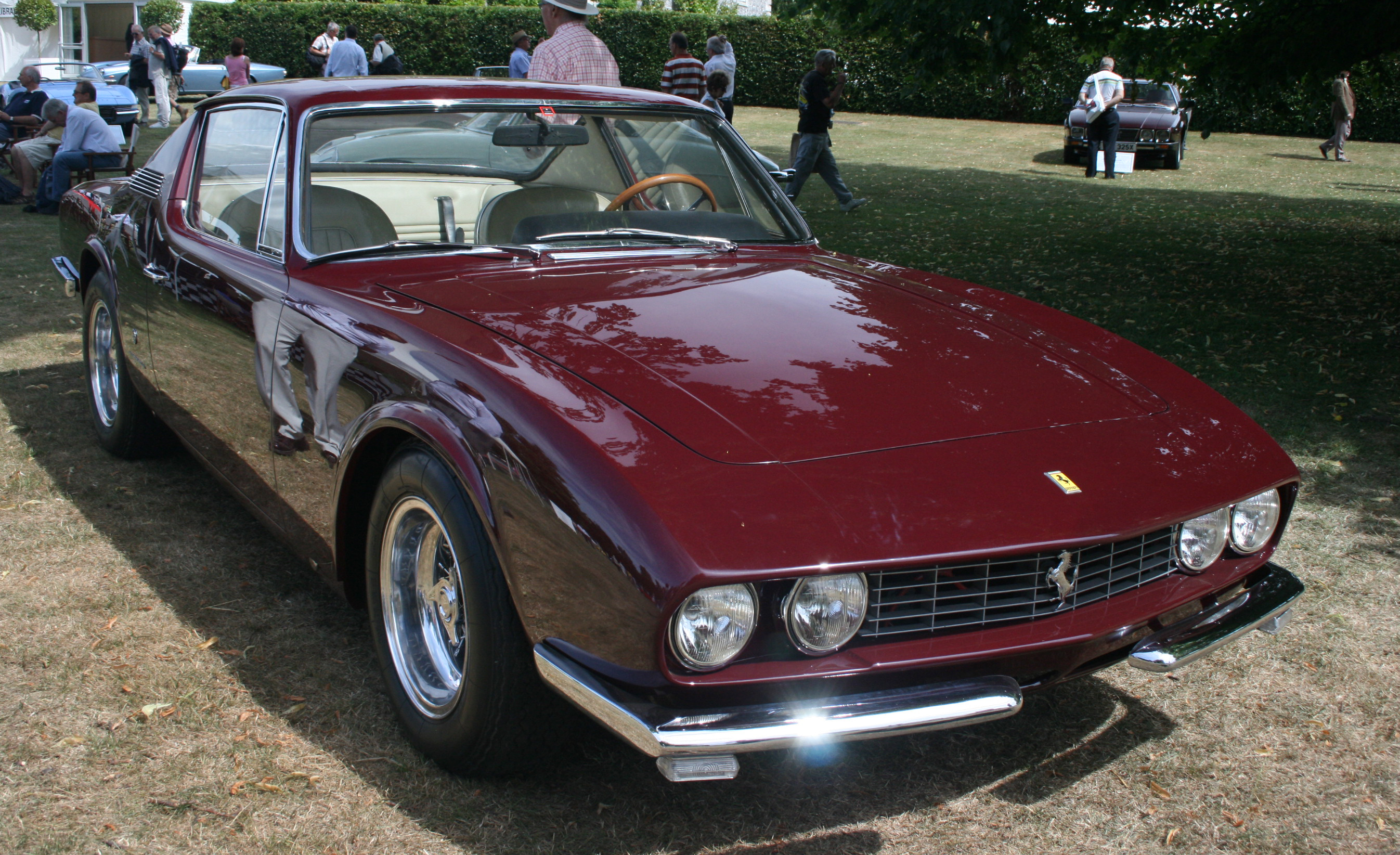
Ferrari 330 GT Michelotti

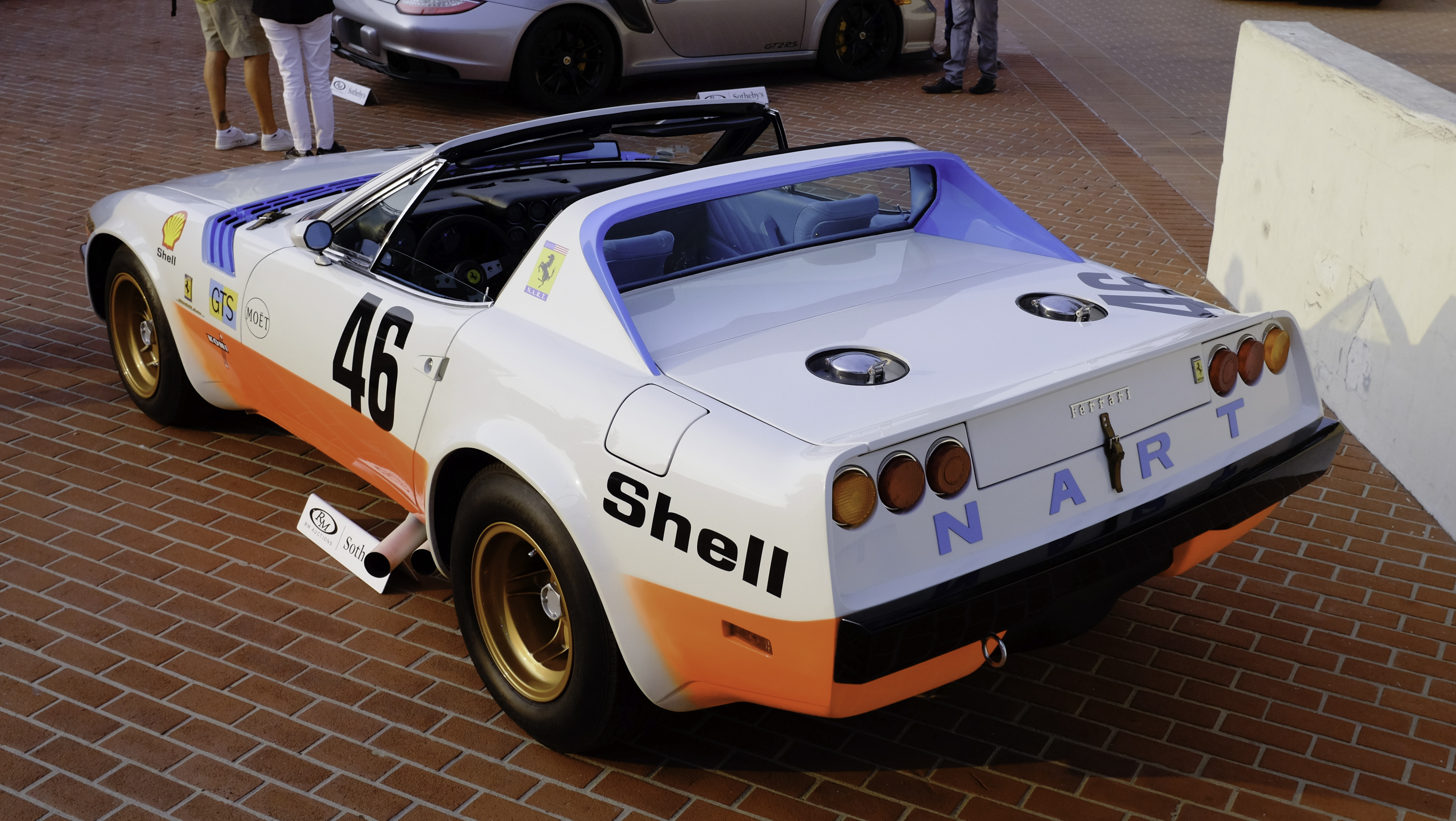
1972 Ferrari 365 GTB/4 NART Spider Competizione, bodied by Michelotti

== Maserati ==
- Maserati A6G 2000 Vignale Coupé, Paris Show car.
- Maserati A6G/54 2000 Allemano Coupé.
- Maserati A6GCS/53 Vignale Spider Corsa, commissioned by Tony Parravano and rebodied by Scaglietti in 1955.
- Maserati 3500 GT Allemano Coupé, 2 units; Spyder, prototypes and series production cars for Vignale.
- Maserati 5000 GT Coupé for Allemano; One-off Coupé realised by Carrozzeria Michelotti, commissioned by Briggs Cunningham.
- Maserati Sebring 1962, prototype and series production cars for Vignale.
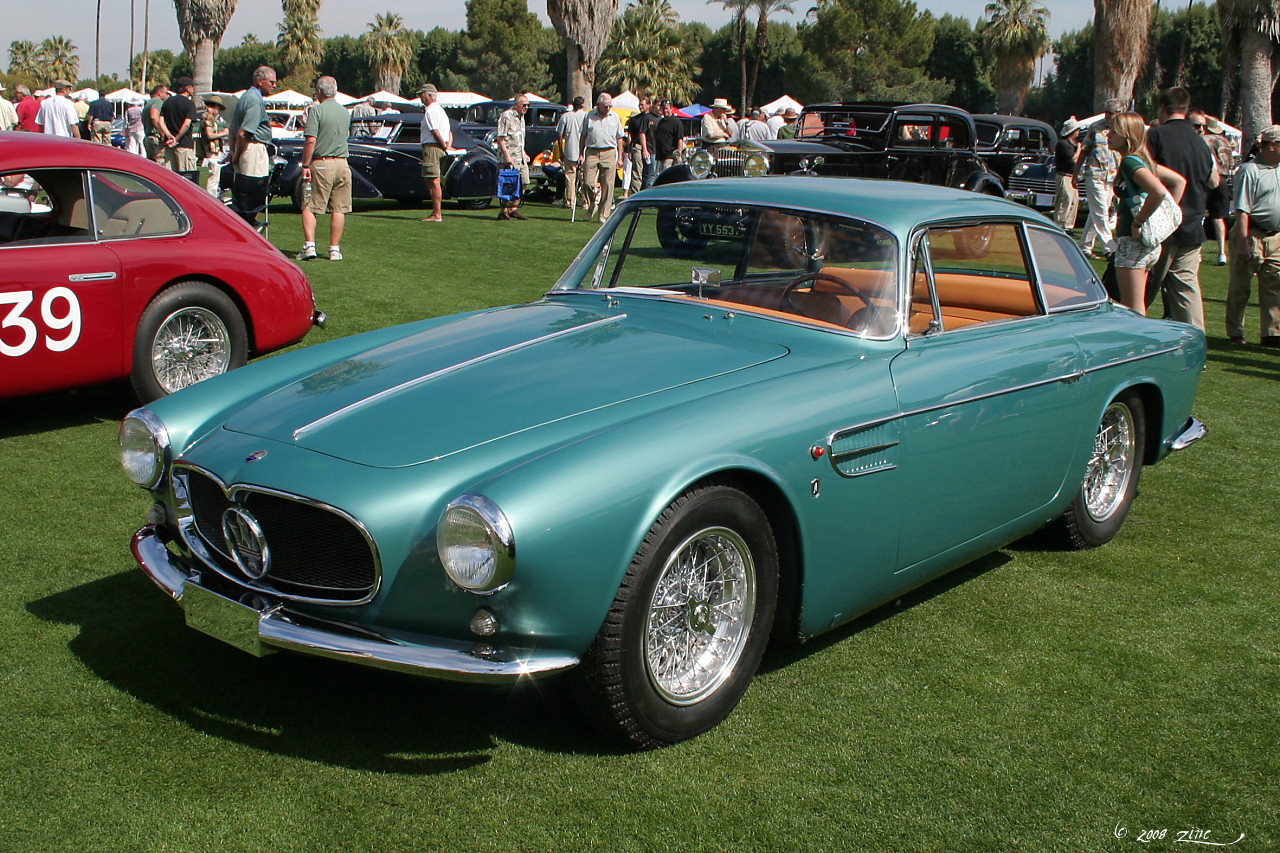
Maserati A6G/54 2000 Allemano Coupé

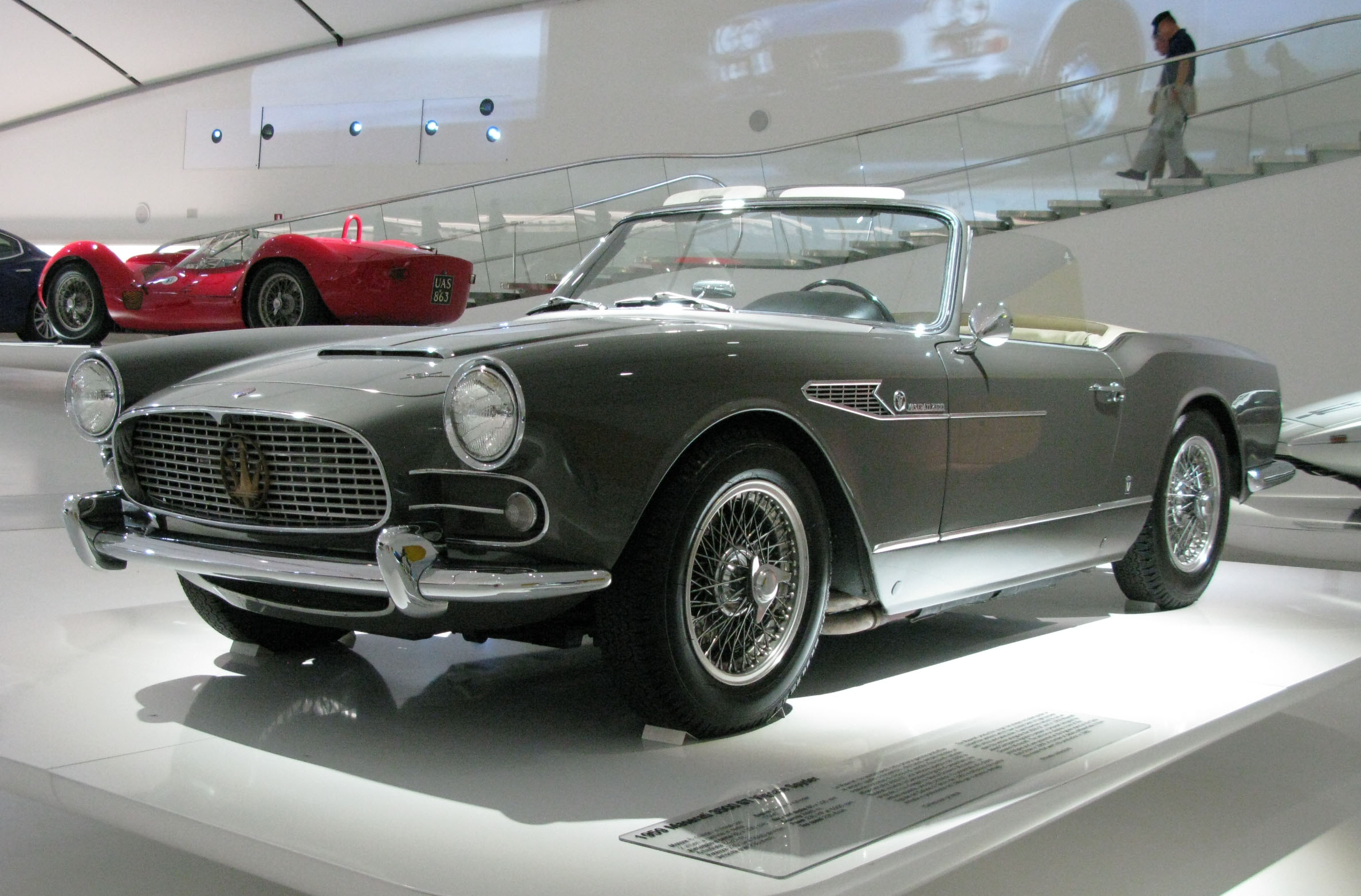
Maserati 3500 GT Spyder prototype

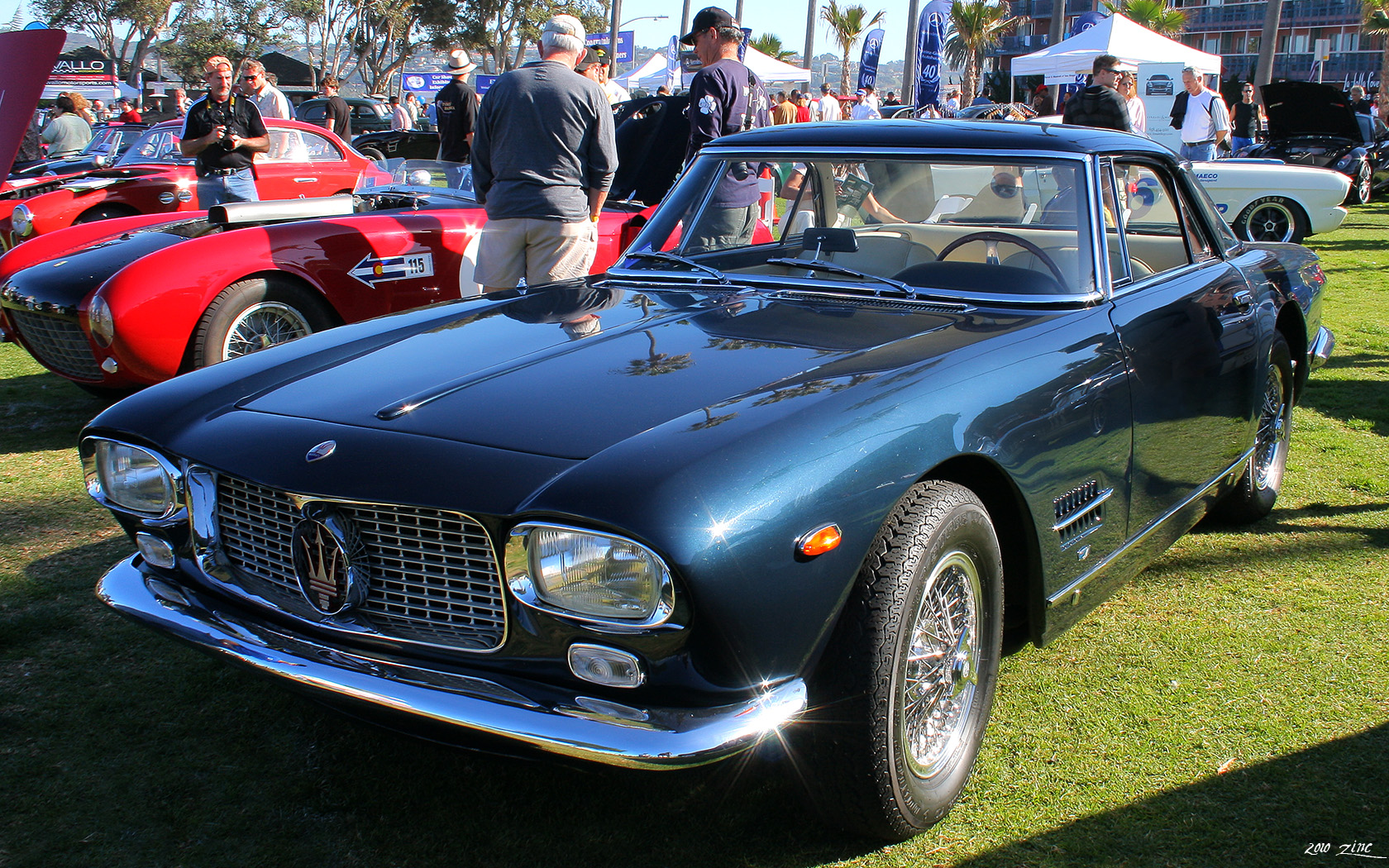
Maserati 5000 GT Allemano Coupé, 22 made in total

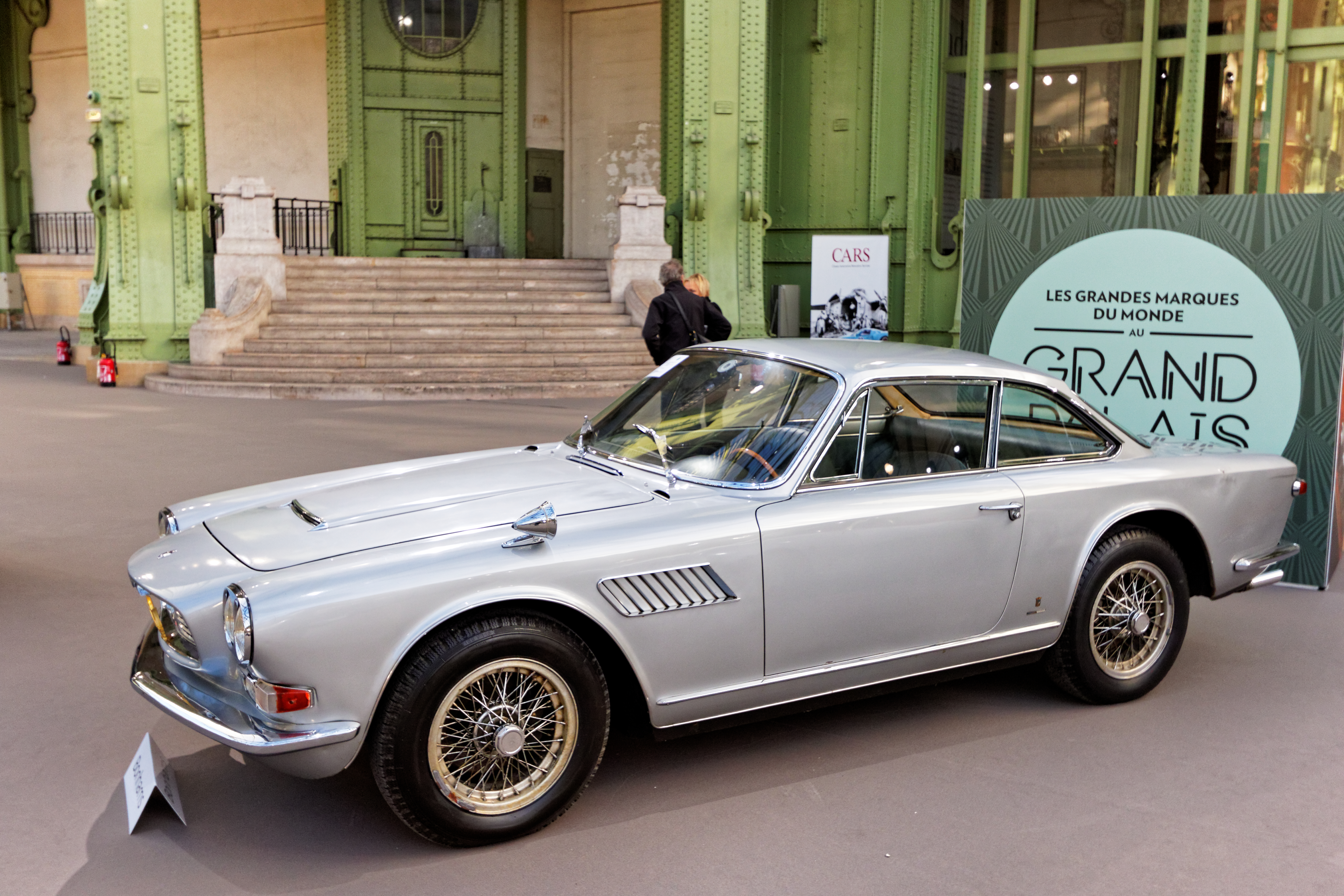
Maserati Sebring series II

== Standard Triumph ==
From the late 1950s Michelotti was responsible for all new models produced by the British company Standard Triumph, starting with a facelift of the Standard Vanguard and going on to design other models for Triumph such as:

- Triumph Herald
- Triumph Spitfire
- Triumph GT6
- Triumph Italia 2000 Coupé
- Triumph TR4
- Triumph TR5 Ginevra
- Triumph 2000
- Triumph 1300
- Triumph Vitesse
- Triumph Stag
- Triumph Dolomite

He also created a number of prototypes which did not go into production, such as the Triumph Fury. The only Triumphs after 1960 that were not his work were the TR6 and the TR7, plus the Honda-based Acclaim.

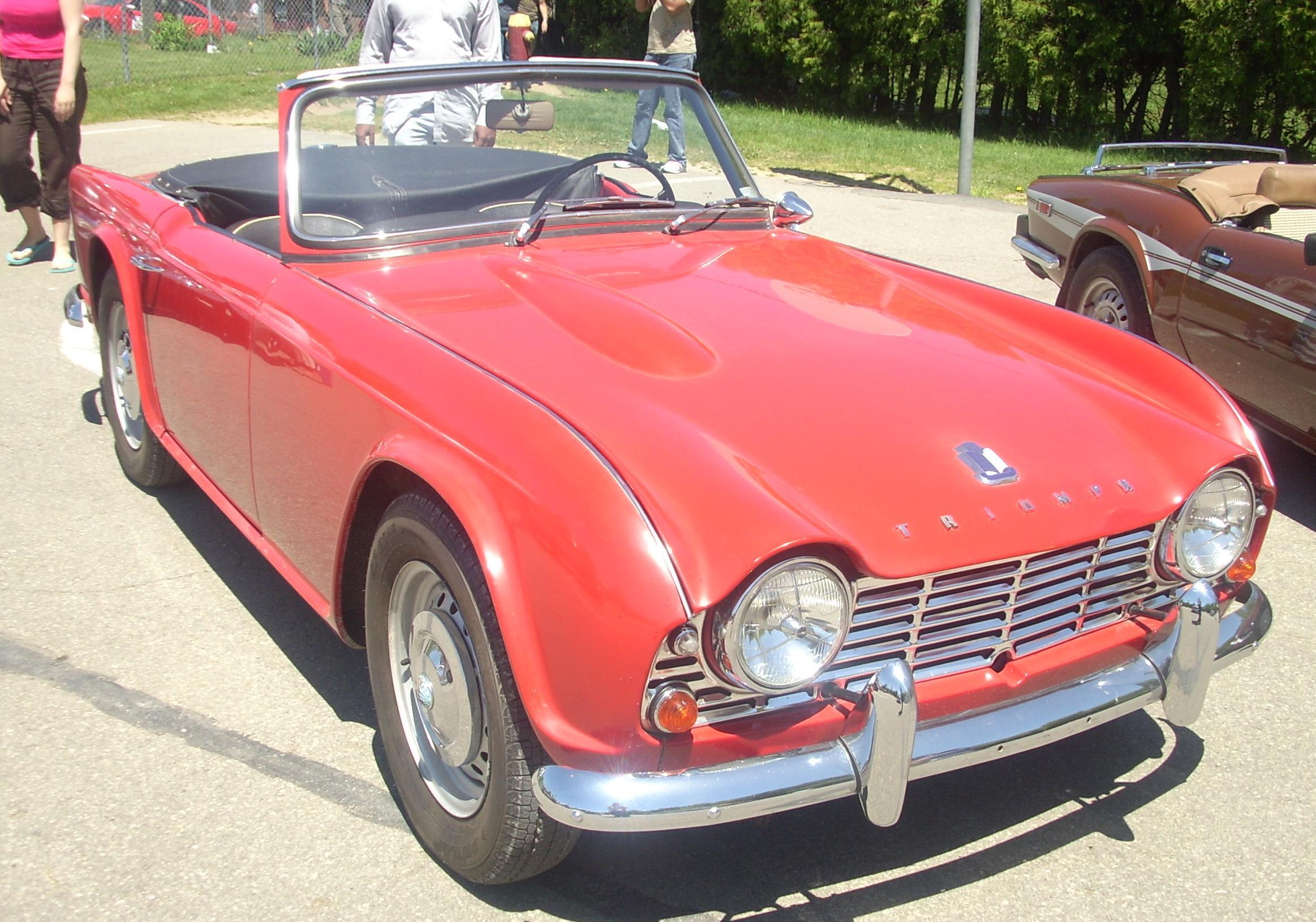
Triumph TR4

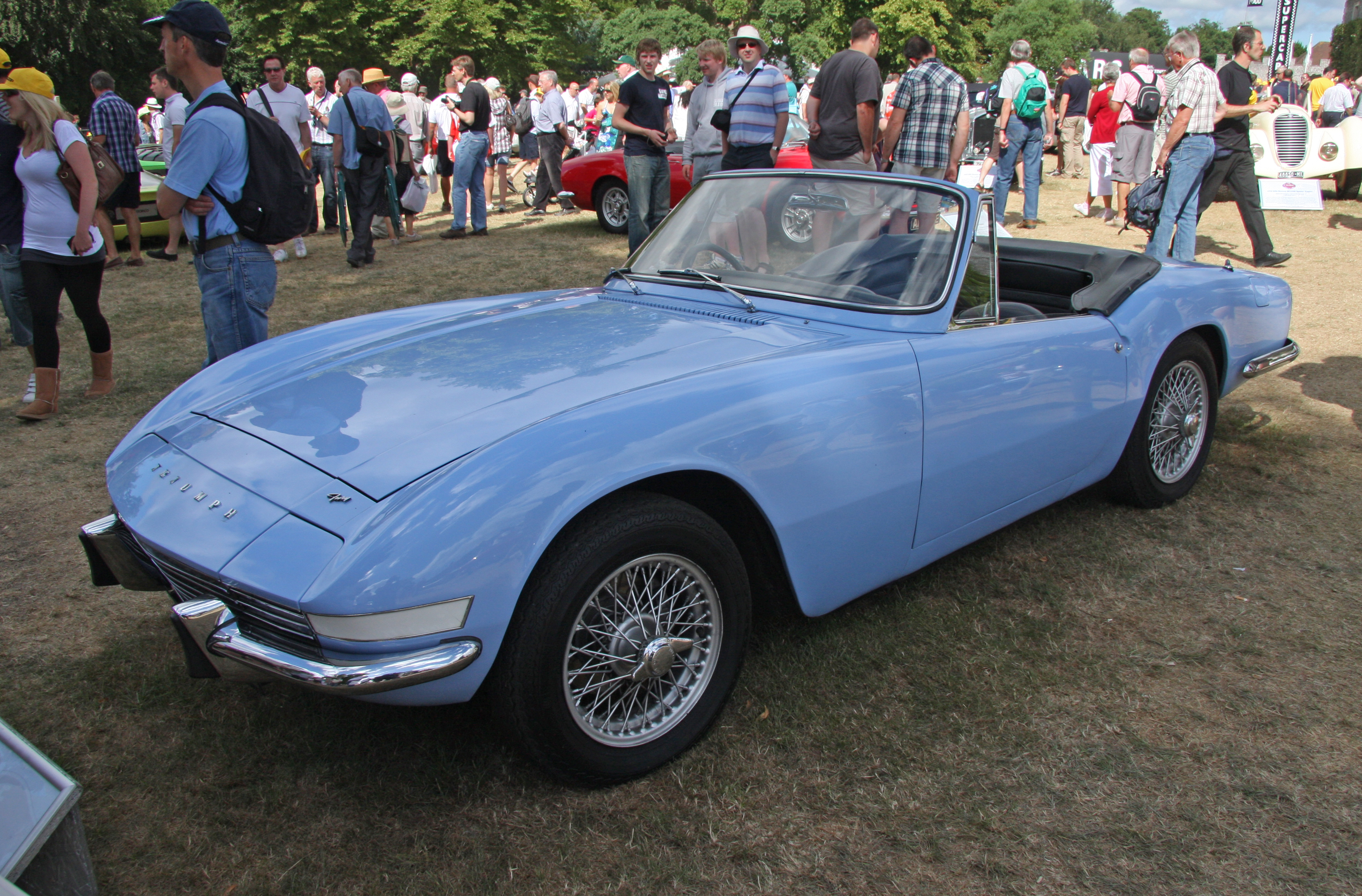
Triumph Fury (prototype)

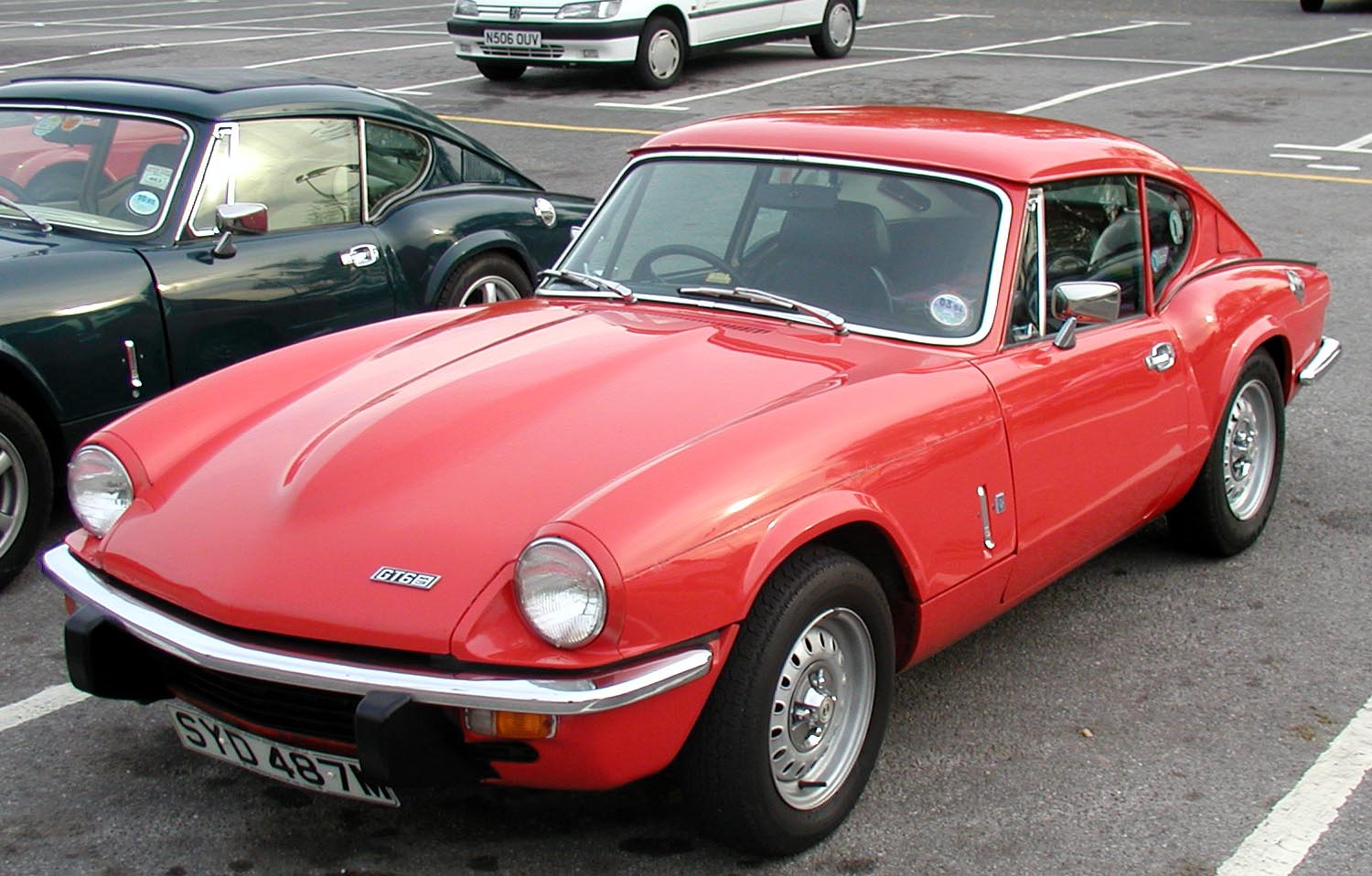
Triumph GT6

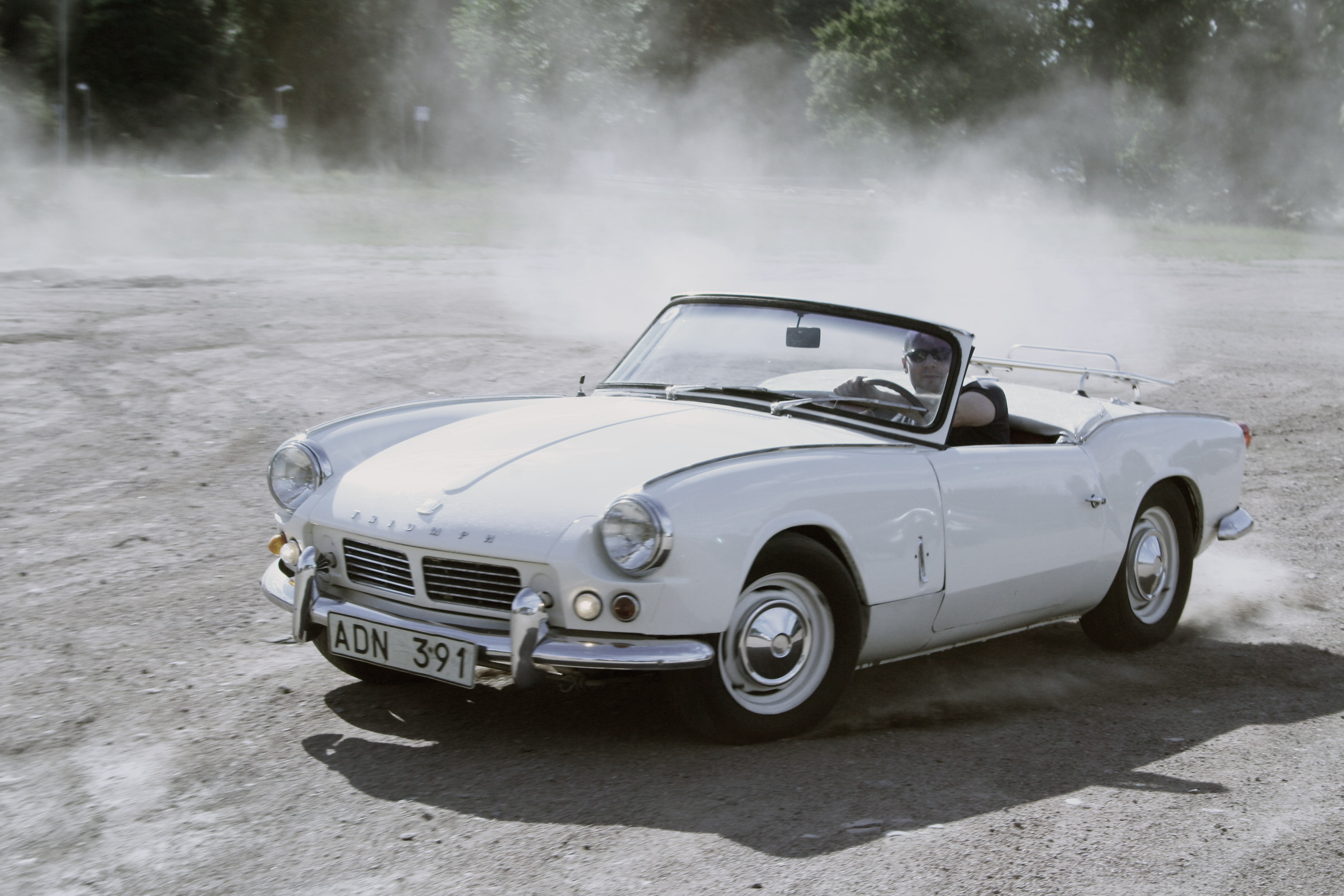
Triumph Spitfire 4 Mark 2

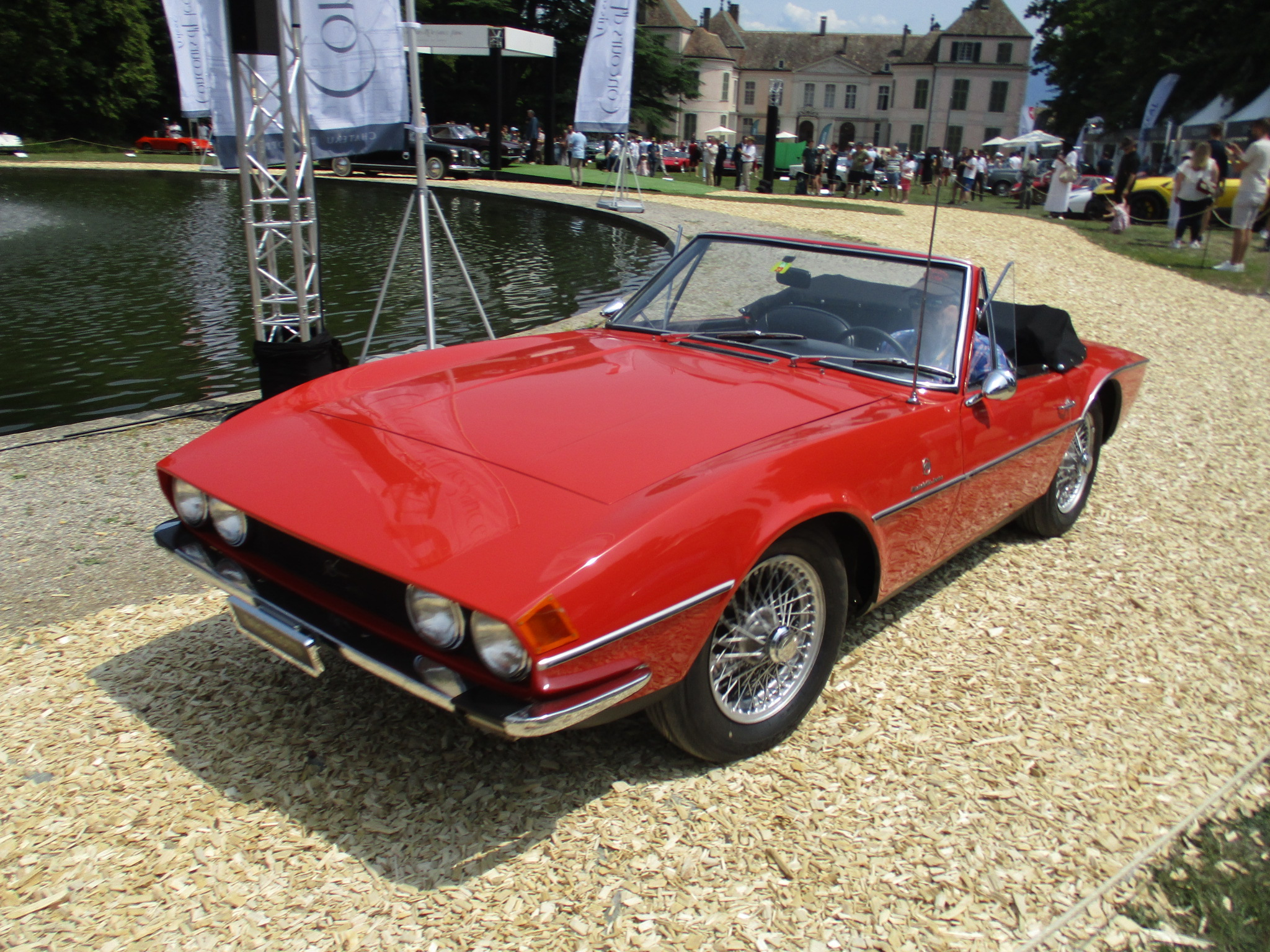
Triumph TR5 Ginevra prototype

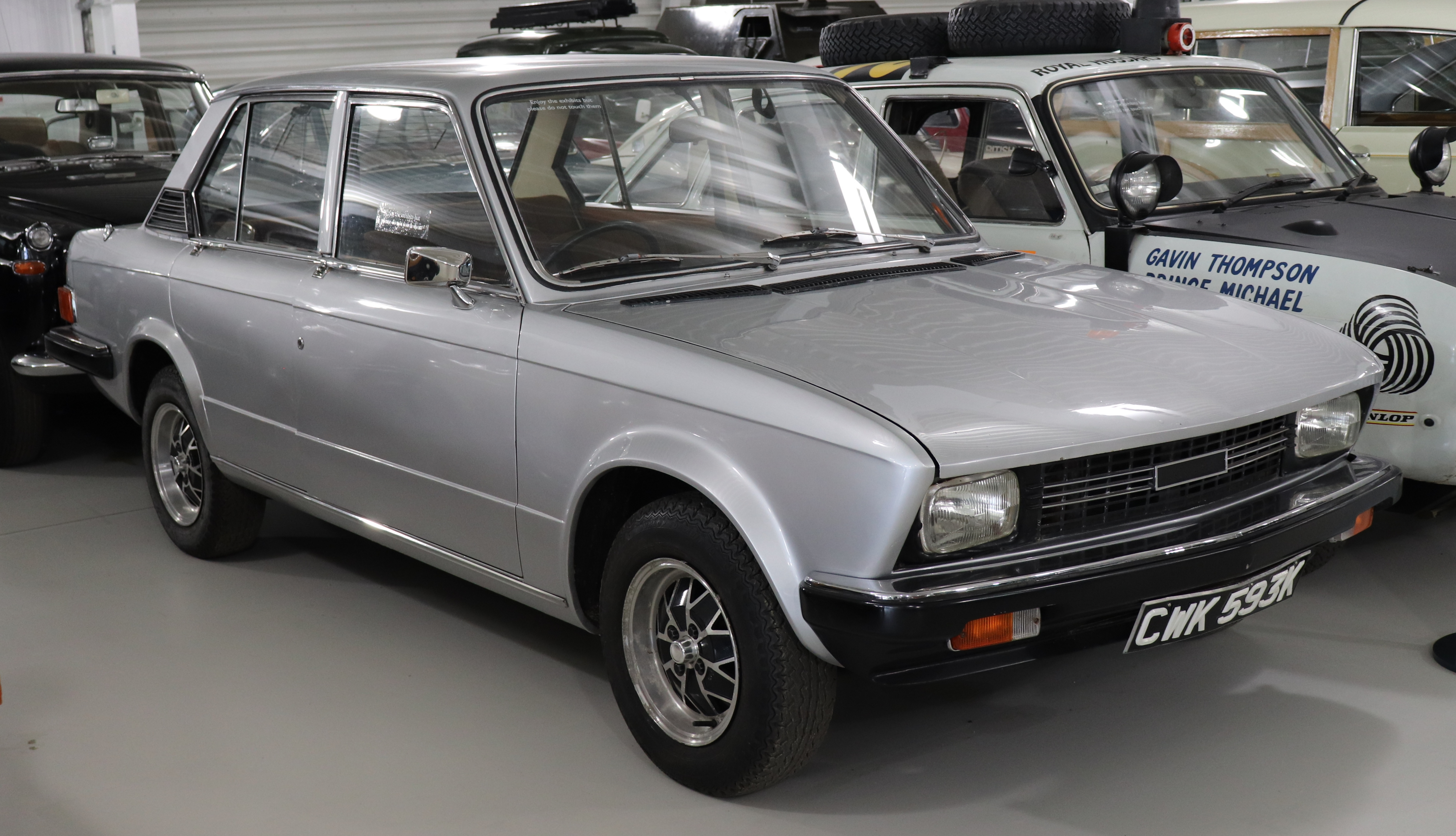
Triumph Dolomite (original concept)

== British Leyland ==
After Triumph's parent company Leyland Motors became a part of British Leyland, Michelotti undertook a facelift of the BMC 1100 – which became the Spanish-built Austin Victoria and also the South African-built Austin Apache. He also designed the Leyland National bus and the Australian-made Leyland P76.

== BMW ==
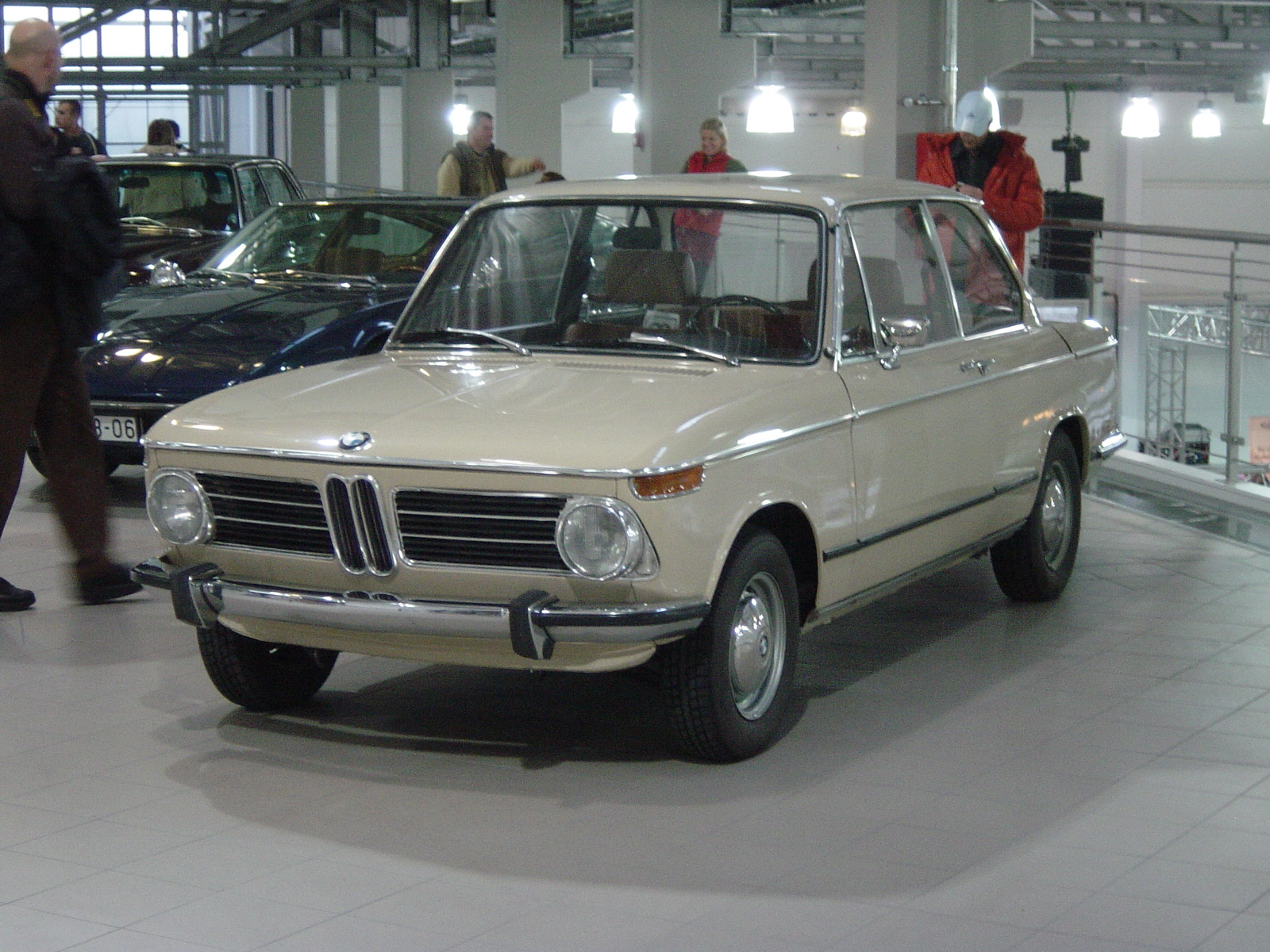
BMW 02-series (1966)

Giovanni Michelotti's BMW association started with the BMW 700 (1959) and later the successful BMW New Class series of designs of which the most notable is the BMW 2002. He also created the 02-Series 2000 Touring model. His sport sedan designs later became the BMW design language, that was continued and refined by Ercole Spada well into the 1980s.

== DAF/Volvo ==
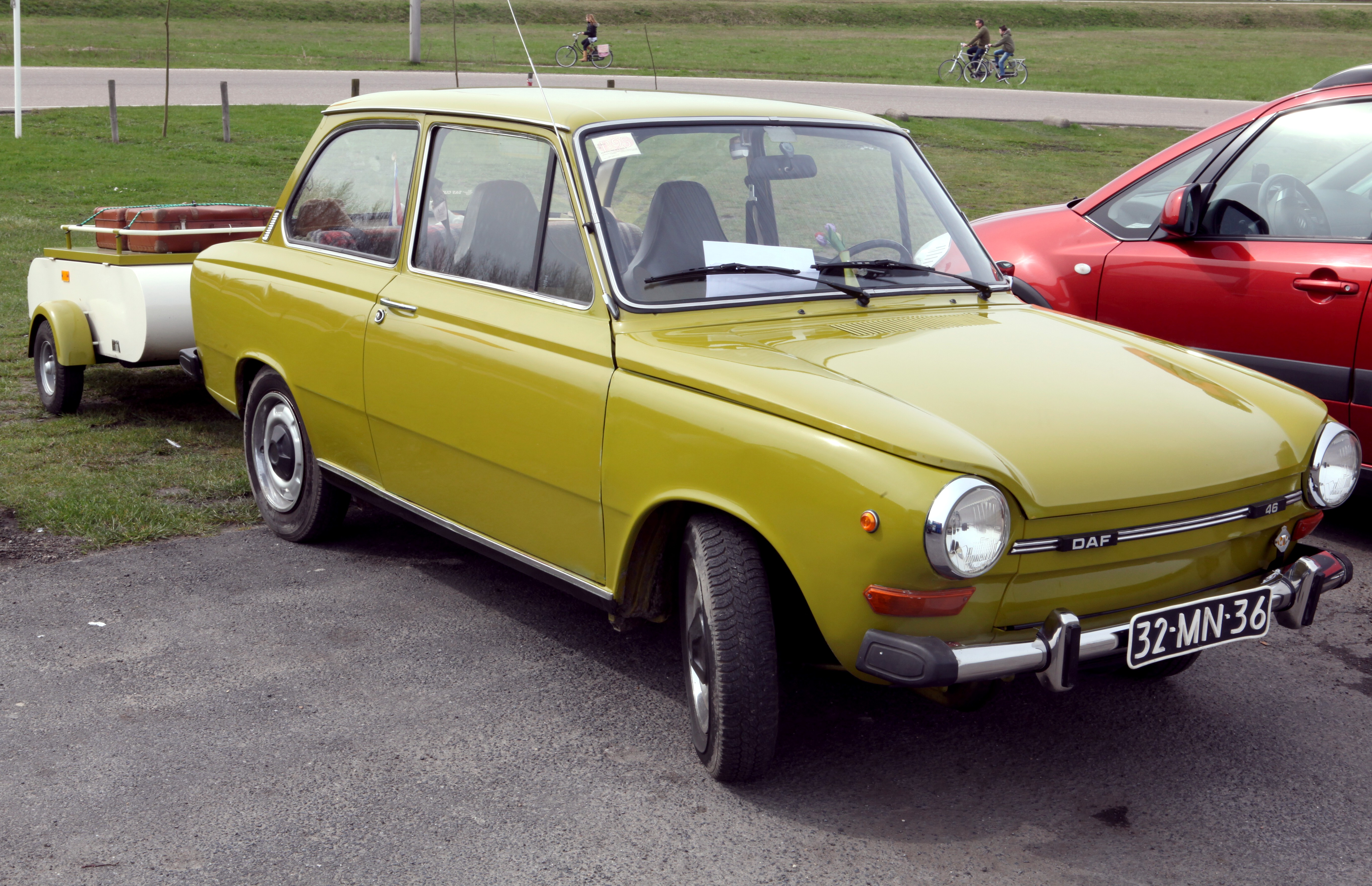
DAF 46, in design a nearly unchanged 44

Michelotti also worked with the Dutch firm DAF, starting in 1963 with redesigning the ageing Daffodil 31 model into the Daffodil 32 and DAF 33. The Shellette beach car was also originally developed to use DAF underpinnings. The DAF 44 (1966) was a completely new design from his hand and he also helped form its derivatives 46, 55 and 66, which culminated in the Volvo 66 (1975). In 1968, Michelotti built a concept car based on his DAF 55 design, called Siluro (Italian for torpedo), which remained in his possession until his death. The car has since been restored and is in possession of the DAF museum in Eindhoven.

== Own work ==
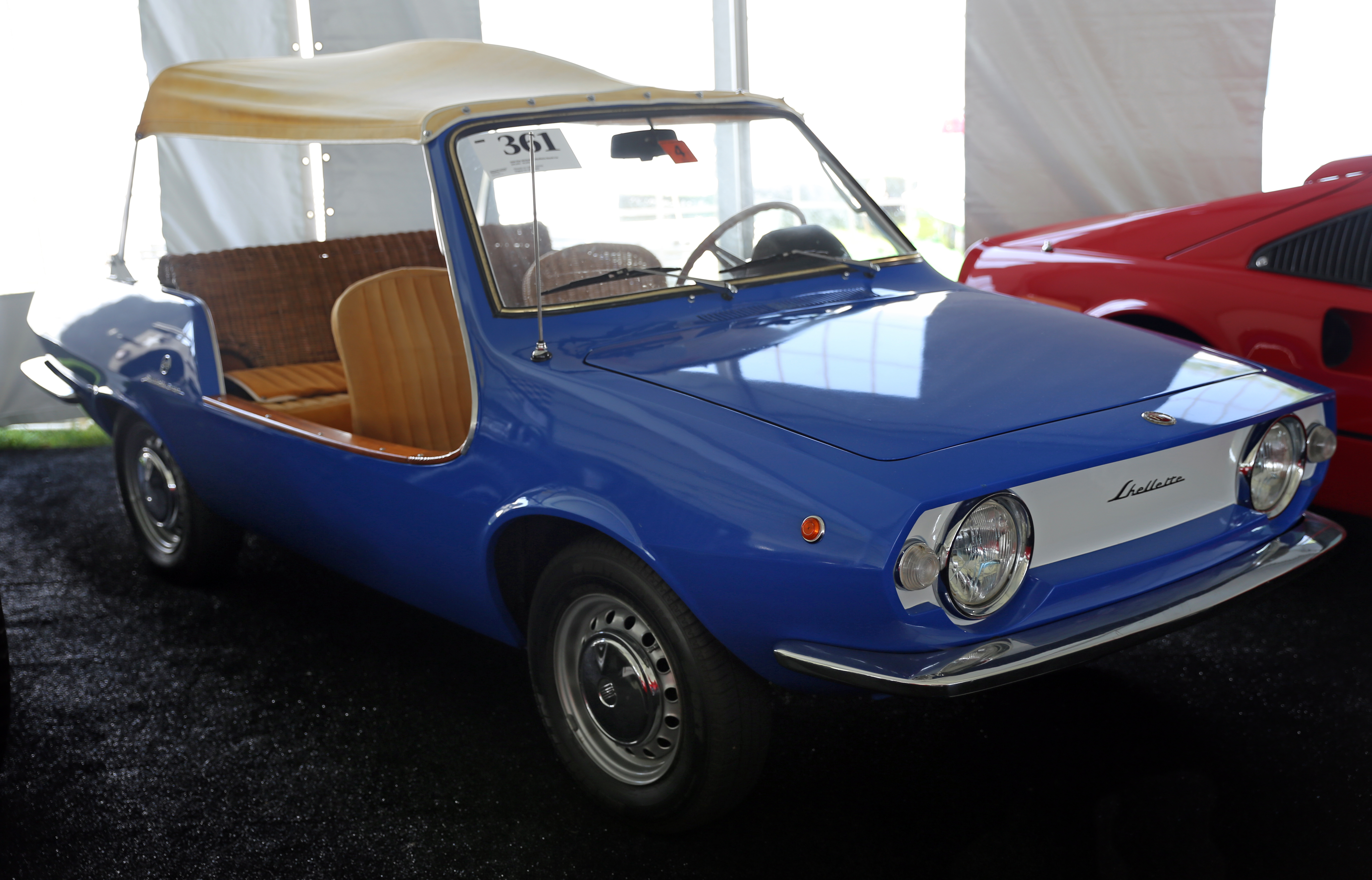
1969 Michelotti Shellette

Michelotti did present a few cars under his own name. The Shellette was a beach car with wicker seats and dashboard in the spirit of Ghia's, Fiat 500 and 600 Jollys. The Shellette was designed in collaboration with yacht designer Philip Schell. Originally constructed with DAF underpinnings, this was later changed to Fiat 850 mechanicals. Unlike the Ghia Jolly, the more powerful 47 hp (35 kW) Shellette was a reasonably useful car having a heater and various other creature comforts. It was also capable of a 60 mph (97 km/h) cruising speed. Only about 80 were built, with around ten still in existence. Famous buyers included the Dutch Royal Family, who used an early DAF-based Shellette at their summer property in Porto Ercole, and Jacqueline Onassis, who employed a later model on the Onassis' private island Skorpios.

Around 1980, the Fiat 127-based "Every" appeared, a light buggy-styled vehicle. Michelotti also marketed a luxurious version of the Daihatsu Taft. In 1985 the Michelotti PAC was presented, a one-off citycar prototype (PAC = "Project Automotive Commuter") based on the Daihatsu Cuore.

== Scammell ==
In the 1960s, Michelotti designed a glass-reinforced plastic (GRP) cab for certain lorries made by Scammell, who had become part of Leyland Motors in 1955. The cab was used for the Routeman, Handyman and Trunker models. The Townsman also had a Michelotti designed cab.

== Other manufacturers ==
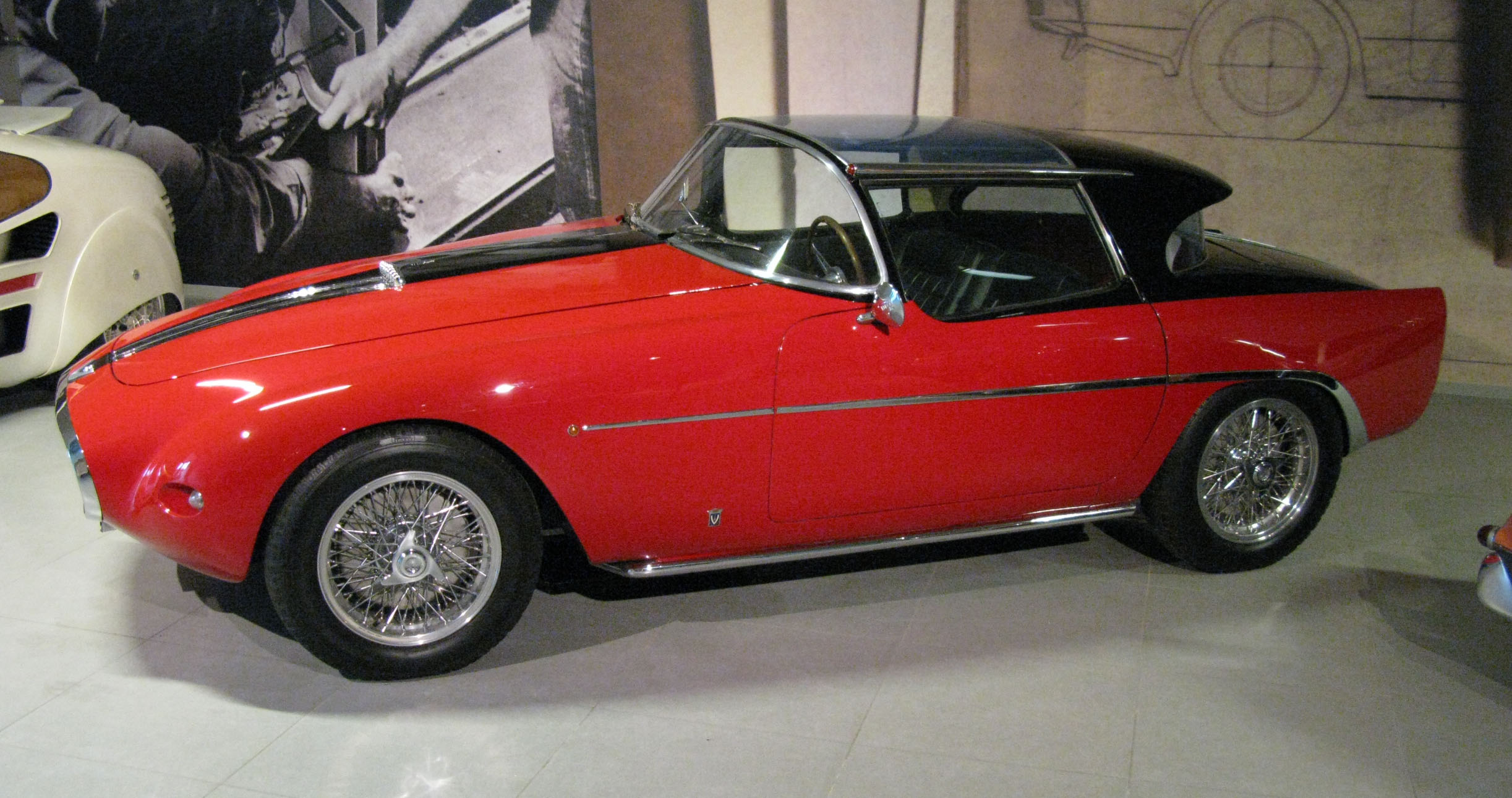
Fiat 8V Demon Rouge

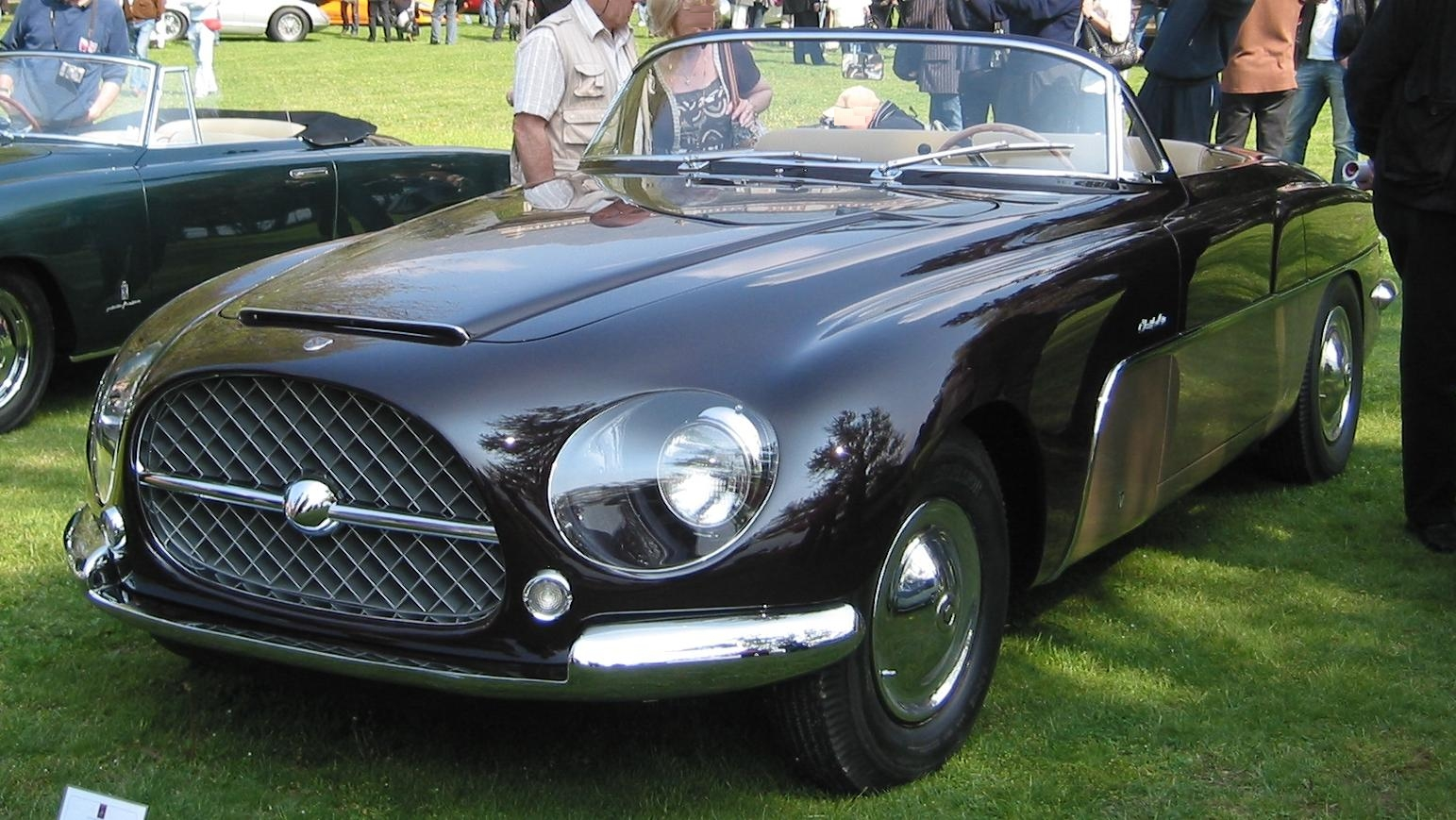
Ford-Cisitalia 808 roadster

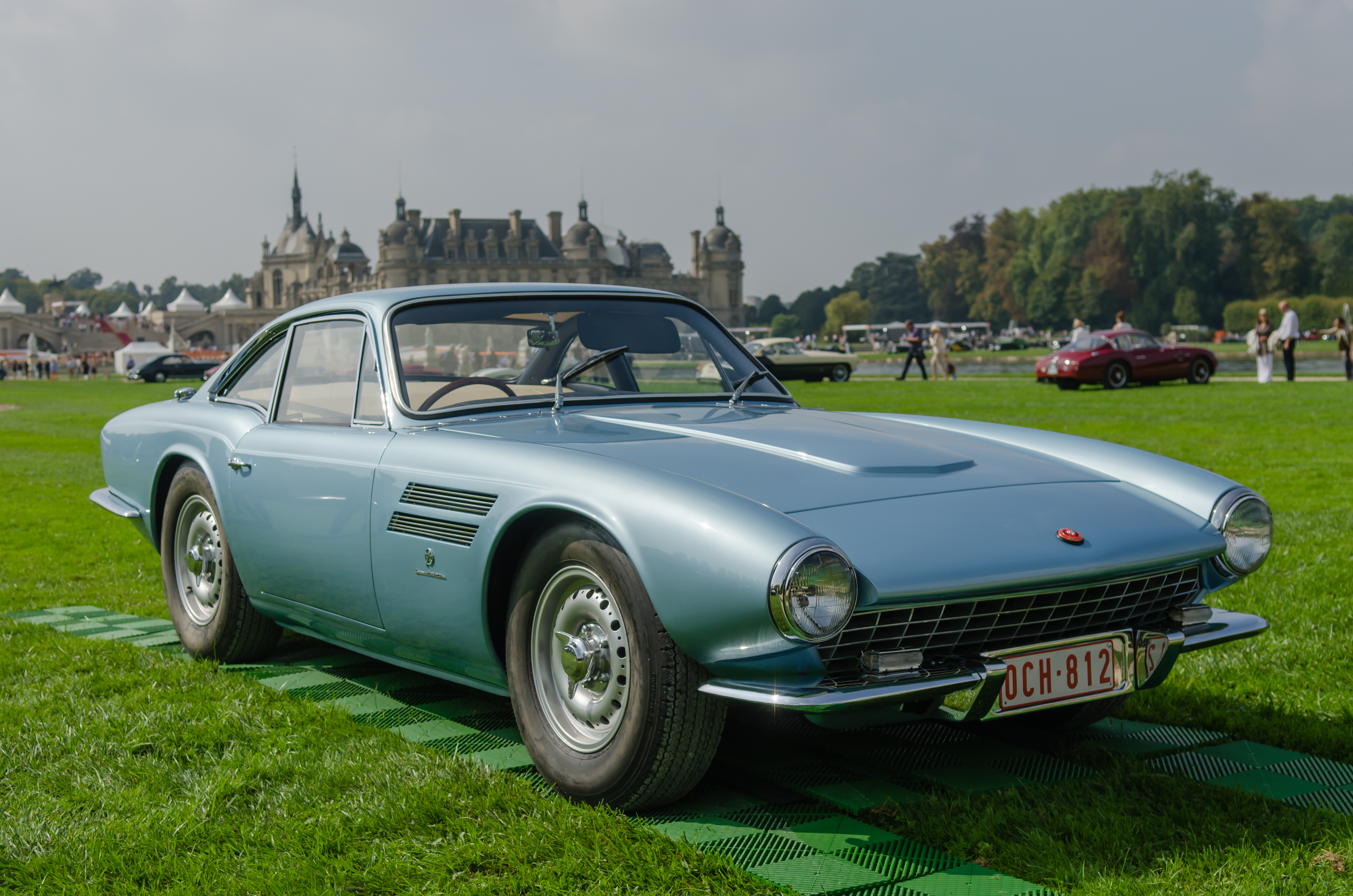
Jaguar XK-D, 1963

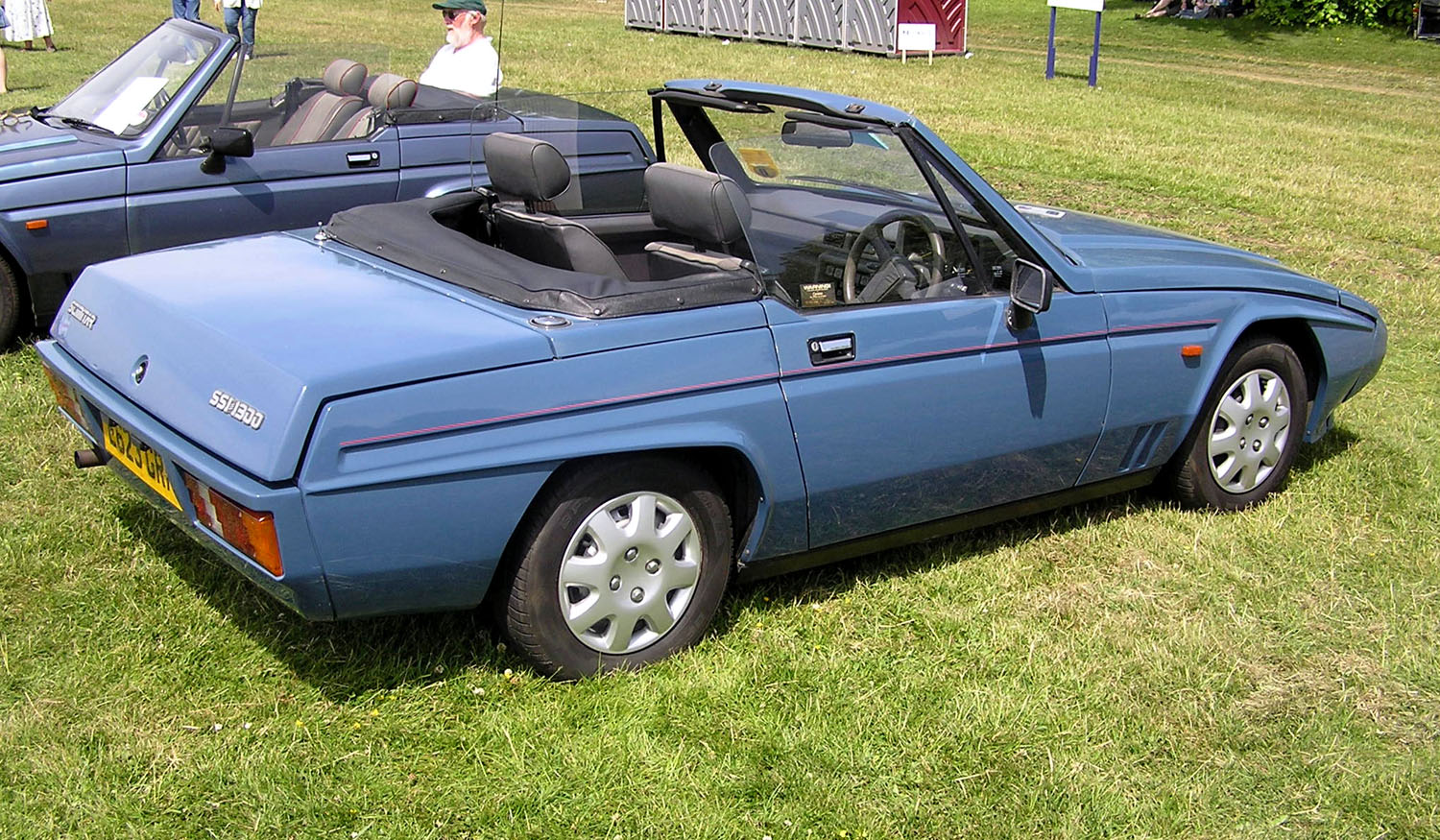
Reliant Scimitar SS1

For other companies he designed the following (this is an incomplete list):

- Abarth 205A Berlinetta
- Arnolt MG for Bertone
- Arnolt-Bentley for Bertone
- Aston Martin DB2/4 Bertone Drophead Coupé
- Aston Martin DB2/4 Vignale Coupé
- Alpine A106 (1955)
- Alpine A108
- Alpine A110
- Armstrong Siddeley (a one-off car based on the Sapphire 234 chassis for a Spanish client)
- Bugatti Type 252
- Cunningham C-3 Vignale Coupé and Cabriolet
- Duple Dominant II coach body
- Fiat 8V Coupé, Cabriolet and Demon Rouge for Vignale
- Ford Anglia Anglia Torino 105E
- Ford-Cisitalia 808 roadster
- Jaguar XK140 Coupé Ghia
- Jaguar XK-D, 1963
- Lola Ultimo concept, 1981
- Matra 530 (1970) facelift
- Hino Contessa Sprint 900 (1962)
- Hino Contessa 1300 (1965)
- Prince Skyline Sport (1960)
- Reliant Scimitar SS1 (1984) which was his last design to reach production, four years after his death.
- Siata 208s (Bertone)
- Siata 1500 TS
- Plymouth Silver Ray commissioned in 1960 by Enrico Nardi
- Packard Eight 'Victoria' Vignale Cabriolet
