= DAF Siluro =

1968 concept car

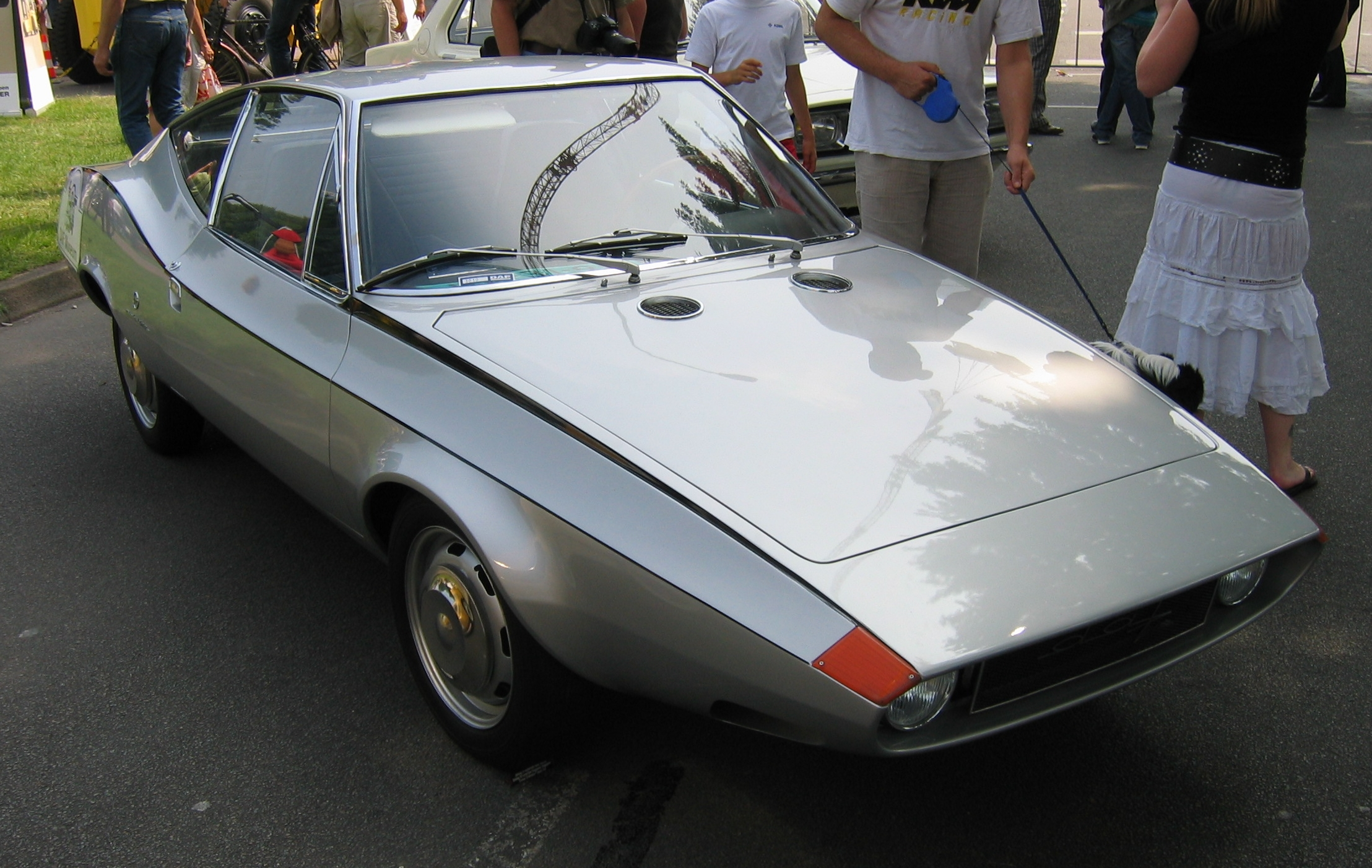
DAF Siluro

The DAF Siluro is a concept car based on the DAF 55. Giovanni Michelotti designed and built it in collaboration with DAF, and it was presented to the public in March 1968 at the Geneva Motor Show.

The Siluro (Italian for Torpedo) is one of the first cars with a wedge shape. Like the DAF 55, the two-seater has a Renault four-cylinder petrol engine with 1,108 cm^{3} (67.6 cu in) and a DAF Variomatic gearbox. After Michelotti's death in 1980, the car was initially parked in Michelotti's son's garden until a car dealer from Germany bought it. The DAF Museum later acquired the vehicle and restored it, which took several years due to the rust-damaged bodywork. In 2005, the Siluro was exhibited at the Amsterdam RAI and can now be seen in the DAF Museum in Eindhoven.
