= Triumph Fury =

Two-door prototype drophead coupé

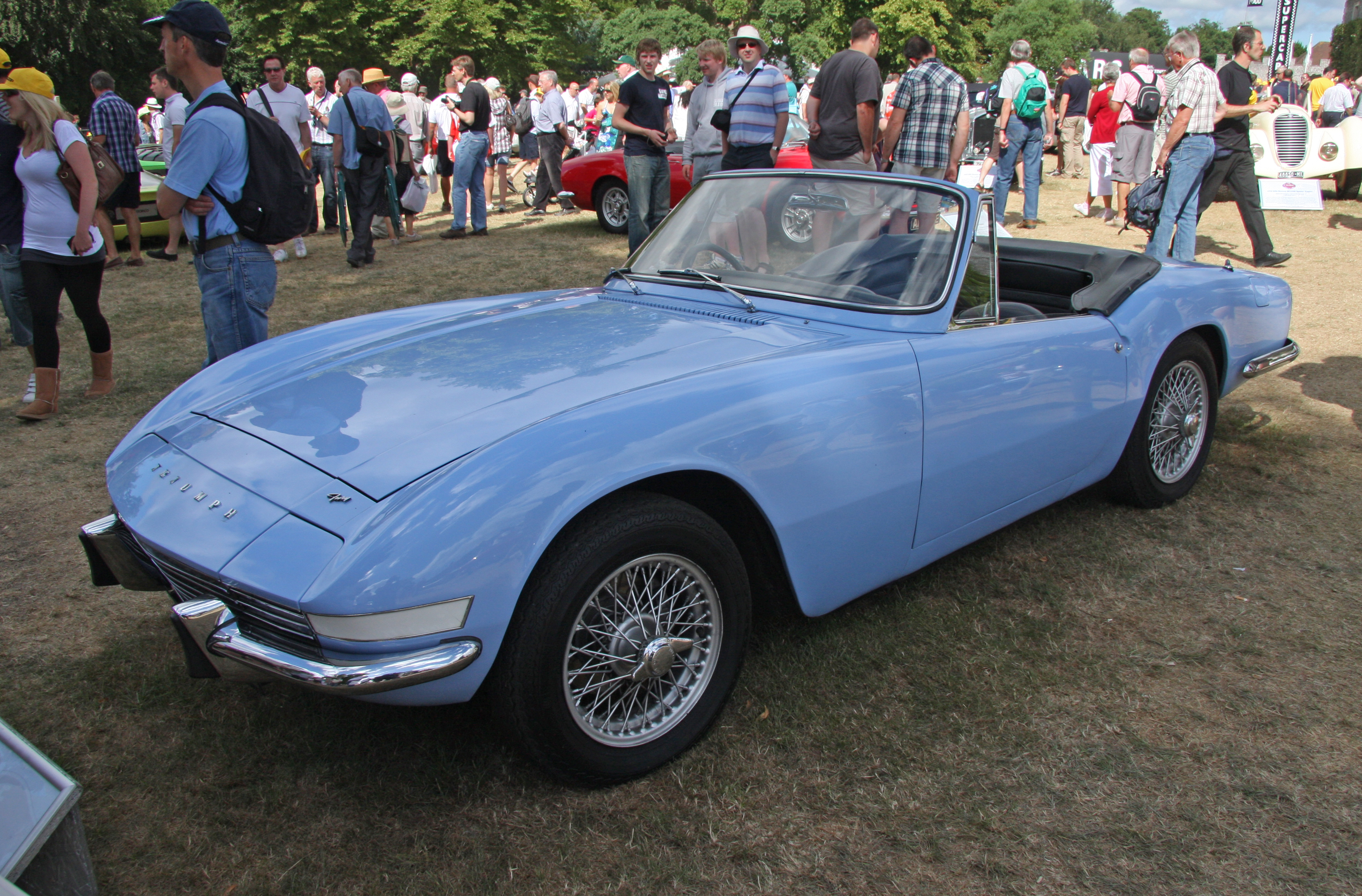

Overview
- Manufacturer: Standard-Triumph, Leyland Motors
- Also called: X749
- Production: 1965
- Designer: Giovanni Michelotti

Body and chassis
- Body style: Two-door convertible
- Layout: FR layout
- Related: Triumph 2000

Powertrain
- Engine: 2.0 L (1,998 cc; 121.9 cu in) I6
- Transmission: 4-speed manual

The Triumph Fury is a prototype two-door drophead coupé commissioned by the Standard-Triumph Company of Coventry, England. It was the first Triumph sports car built on a unitary construction platform.

== History ==
References to a "TR5" began to appear in the minutes of meetings of the Standard-Triumph board in 1964, and some photos of the car in the company archives are labeled "TR5 Fury".

In 1964 Triumph's Chief Engineer Harry Webster visited the carrozzeria of Italian designer Giovanni Michelotti, where he was shown a wooden mockup. On 12 November 1964 a Triumph engineer went to Italy to arrange for a prototype "TR5" to be built. Triumph engineer David Eley took the lead on the Fury's chassis development. The car was delivered in 1965.

The Fury was built with a 2.0 L inline six cylinder engine. Triumph's later 2.5 L version of this engine would have been a simple upgrade for a production version of the car. Drawings are said to exist of the Fury with a V8 engine installed — possibly anticipating it using the single overhead camshaft Triumph V8 engine developed as a variant of the Triumph slant-four engine. The V8 appeared in the Triumph Stag.

Upon receipt by Triumph, the Fury was road tested by factory test drivers Fred Nicklin and Gordon Birtwhistle. The Fury did not receive its factory project code of X749 until 7 June 1966. It was three years before Triumph registered the Fury as TVT 990G. It was re-registered as GL 484 by a later owner, then had its original registry restored after being sold again.

By 1966, Triumph's attention had shifted to a different Michelotti prototype built on a Triumph 2000 platform that led to the Stag, and development of the Fury ended.

Triumph opted to revise their existing ladder-chassis-based platform for the next TR model, releasing the six cylinder Triumph TR5 in August 1967. One possible reason for Triumph's decision to abandon the Fury is that they were either unwilling or unable to invest in the production line and tooling facilities needed to build the car. Other possible justifications include the ability to assemble cars with separate chassis in overseas markets from complete knockdown (CKD) kits, and the ability to easily produce entirely new bodywork without having to redesign the chassis.

The Fury was sold by the factory to dealer Rod Leach. It was later sold to John Ward, the curator of the Patrick Collection in Birmingham, where it underwent a sympathetic restoration. After Ward's death in 2000, the car was sold to Ken Chisholm.

In 2009 the Fury was bought by collector Jane Weitzmann. The new owner had some corrosion damage repaired, then had the car scanned to create a 3D model of it to facilitate production of replacement panels. She makes the car available for hire through her classic car rental business.

== Features ==
The Fury shares many features with the contemporary Triumph 2000 saloon, including a six cylinder engine, a strut-type front suspension, an independent rear suspension, and a unibody chassis. (Some sources report that the Fury's transmission and rear suspension are from the TR4A.)

Both the 2000 and the Fury are powered by the 2.0 L Triumph 6-cylinder engine, although the engine in the Fury received the sump from the Triumph Vitesse and the intake manifold from the GT6. With bore × stroke dimensions of 74.7 mm × 76 mm (2.941 in × 2.992 in), this overhead valve engine displaces 1,998 cc (121.9 cu in). Fitted with two Zenith Stromberg CD150 carburetters, it produces 95 bhp (70.8 kW) at 5000 rpm, and 115 lb⋅ft (155.9 N⋅m) at 3000 rpm. These figures allow the Fury to accelerate from 0 to 60 mph (0 to 97 km/h) in 12.5 seconds, and have a top speed of 115 mph (185 km/h).

The engine is backed by a four-speed manual transmission. The Fury was not fitted with the overdrive offered as an option on the saloon.

The front suspension on both cars is a MacPherson strut design, and in the back both use semi-trailing arms.

The 2000 was the first Triumph of any kind to use a unitary construction chassis, and the Fury the first Triumph sportscar to use such a platform. Standard-Triumph's first unibody car was the Standard Eight of 1953.

The Fury's body is of hand-formed steel panels. Reminiscent of an enlarged Spitfire, it is a two door, two seat body with low doors, and a low package shelf behind the seats. The windscreen surround has been compared to those of the Spitfire and TR4. The headlamps are hidden behind movable covers operated by engine vacuum. Each cover consists of two parts — an upper part that raises when activated, and a lower part that drops.

Steering is by a rack and pinion system sourced from the Triumph 1300. Brakes are discs in front and drums in back.
